= 4-6-0 =

Railway steam locomotive wheel arrangement

4-6-0 (Ten-wheeler)
- Front of locomotive at left

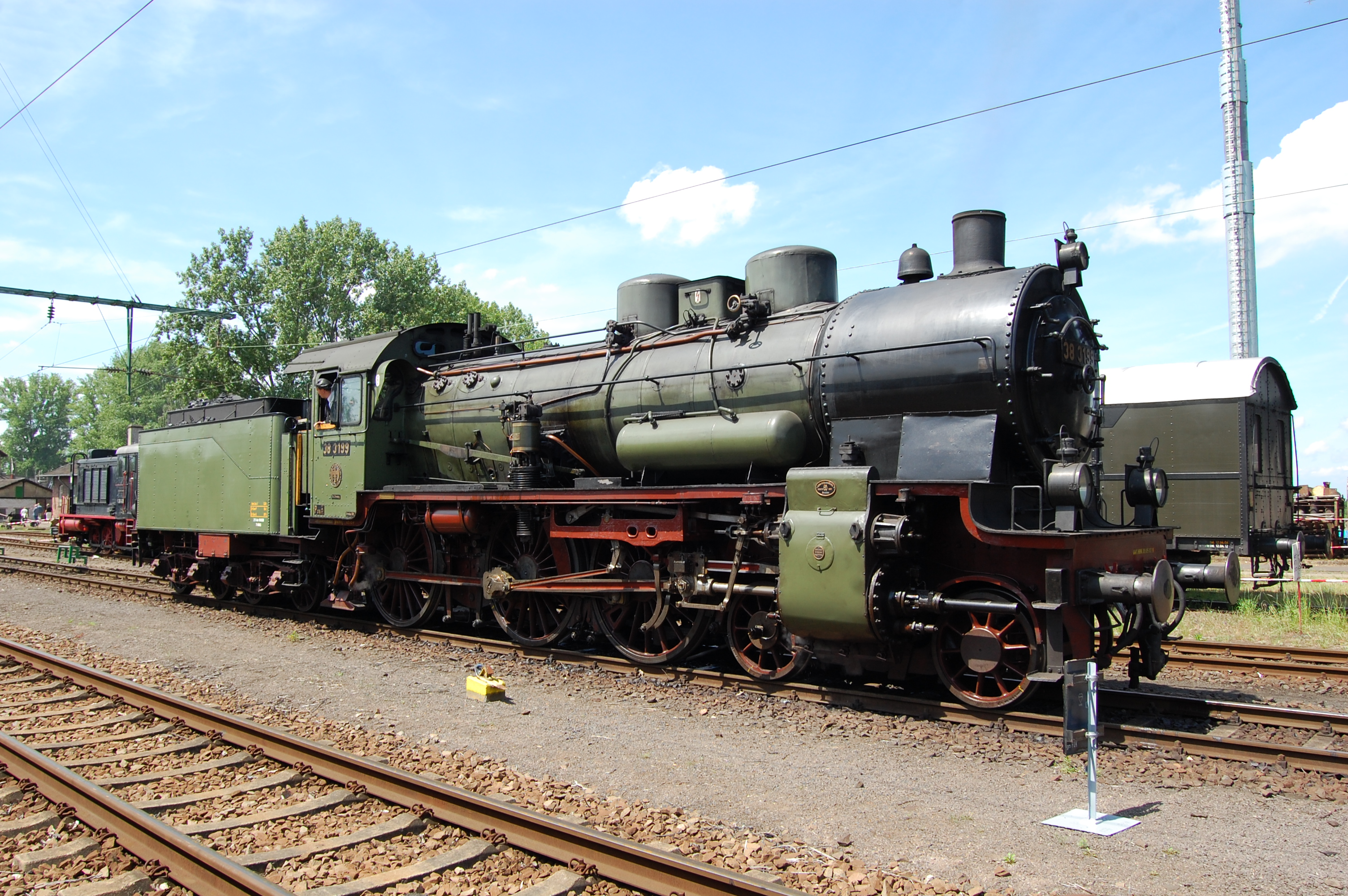
- Prussian P 8, the most numerous 2'C 4-6-0 in the world
Equivalent classifications
- UIC class: 2C, 2'C
- French class: 230
- Turkish class: 35
- Swiss class: 3/5
- Russian class: 2-3-0
First known tank engine version
- First use: 1880
- Country: Colony of Natal
- Locomotive: NGR Class G
- Railway: Natal Government Railways
- Designer: Kitson and Company
- Builder: Kitson and Company
- Evolved from: 2-6-0T
First known tender engine version
- First use: 1847
- Country: United States
- Locomotive: Chesapeake
- Railway: Philadelphia and Reading Railroad
- Designer: Septimus Norris
- Builder: Norris Locomotive Works
- Evolved from: 4-4-0
- Evolved to: 4-6-2 and 2-8-0
- Benefits: Larger and more powerful than the 4-4-0
- Drawbacks: Small firebox

A 4-6-0 steam locomotive, under the Whyte notation for the classification of steam locomotives by wheel arrangement, has four leading wheels on two axles in a leading bogie and six powered and coupled driving wheels on three axles with the absence of trailing wheels.

In the mid-19th century, this wheel arrangement became the second-most-popular configuration for new steam locomotives in the United States, where this type is commonly referred to as a Ten-wheeler. As locomotives pulling trains of lightweight all-wood passenger cars from the 1890 to the 1920s, they were exceptionally stable at near 100 mph (160 km/h) speeds on the New York Central's New York-to-Chicago Water Level Route and on the Reading Railroad's line from Camden to Atlantic City, New Jersey.

== Overview ==
=== Tender locomotives ===
During the second half of the nineteenth and first half of the twentieth centuries, the 4-6-0 was constructed in large numbers for passenger and mixed traffic service. A natural extension of the 4-4-0 American wheel arrangement, the four-wheel leading bogie gave good stability at speed and allowed a longer boiler to be supported, while the lack of trailing wheels gave a high adhesive weight.

The primary limitation of the type was the small size of the firebox, which limited power output. In passenger service, it was eventually superseded by the 4-6-2 Pacific type whose trailing truck allowed it to carry a greatly enlarged firebox. Prussia and Saxony however went directly to the 2-8-2 Mikado type (pr. P10(39) / sax. XX HV(19) class); Karl Gölsdorf reversed the 2′C1 Pacific type to the 2-6-4 Adriatic type to accommodate an even larger firebox and better curve performance (type 310). For freight service, the addition of a fourth driving axle created the 4-8-0 Mastodon type, which was rare in North America, but became very popular on Cape gauge in Southern Africa.

=== Tank locomotives ===
The 4-6-0T locomotive version was a far less common type. It was used for passenger duties during the first decade of the twentieth century, but was soon superseded by the 4-6-2T Pacific, 4-6-4T Hudson and 2-6-4T Adriatic types, on which larger fuel bunkers were possible. During the First World War, the type was also used on narrow-gauge military railways.

== Usage ==
=== Angola ===
==== Cape gauge ====
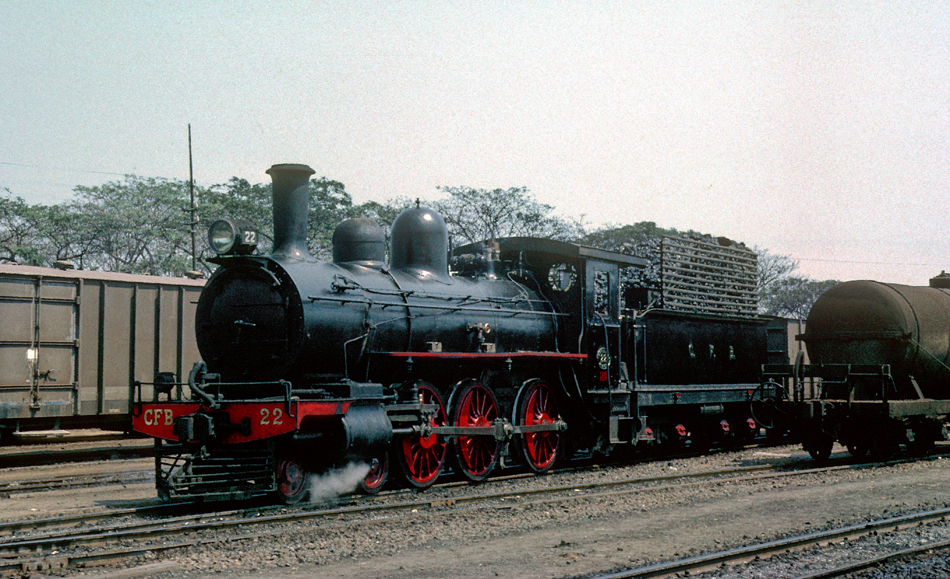
Ex CGR 6th Class No. 218, CFB No. 22, at Benguela on 12 August 1972

In 1907, five 6th Class locomotives of the Cape Government Railways were sold to the 3 ft 6 in (1,067 mm) Benguela Railway (CFB). These included one of the Dübs-built locomotives of 1897 and two each of the Neilson and Company and Neilson, Reid and Company-built locomotives of 1897 and 1898. (Also see South Africa - Cape gauge)

In the mid-1930s, in order to ease maintenance, modifications were made to the running boards and brake gear of the CFB locomotives. The former involved mounting the running boards higher, thereby getting rid of the driving wheel fairings. This gave the locomotives a much more American rather than British appearance.

==== Narrow gauge ====
In April 1951, three Class NG9 locomotives were purchased from the South African Railways for the Caminhos de Ferro de Moçâmedes (CFM). They were placed in service on the Ramal da Chibía, a 600 mm (1 ft 11 5/8 in) gauge branch line across 116 kilometres (72 miles) from Sá da Bandeira to Chiange. The locomotives were observed dumped at the Sá da Bandeira shops by 1969 and the branch line itself was closed in 1970. (Also see South Africa - Narrow gauge)

=== Bechuanaland ===
In 1897, three Class 6 4-6-0 locomotives were ordered by the Cape Government Railways (CGR) from Neilson and Company for use on the new Vryburg to Bulawayo line of the fledgling Bechuanaland Railway Company (BR). The line through Bechuanaland Protectorate was still under construction and was operated by the CGR on behalf of the BR at the time. The locomotives were eventually returned to the CGR.

=== Canada ===
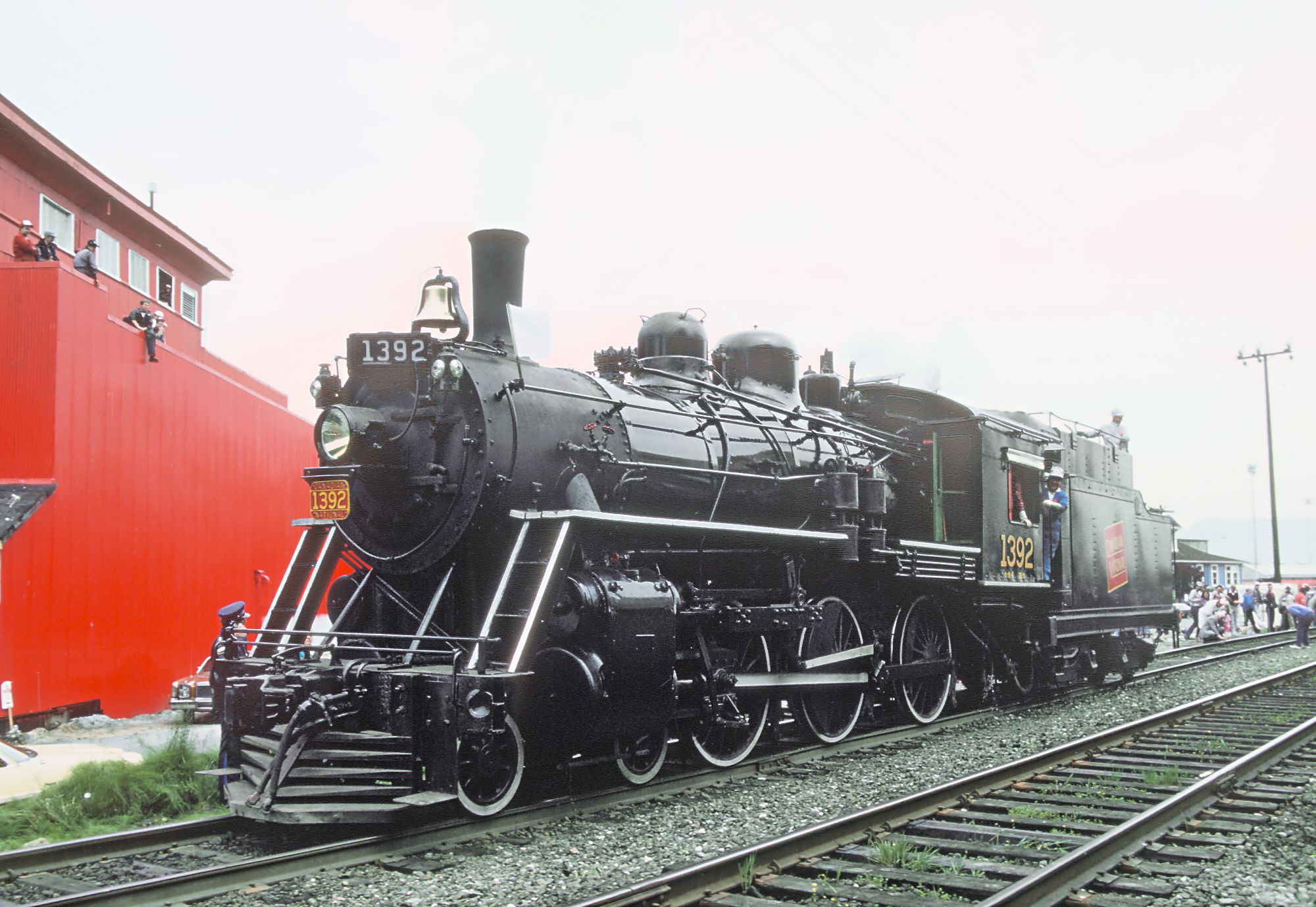
Canadian National Railways 4-6-0 No. 1392 at Steam Expo 1986

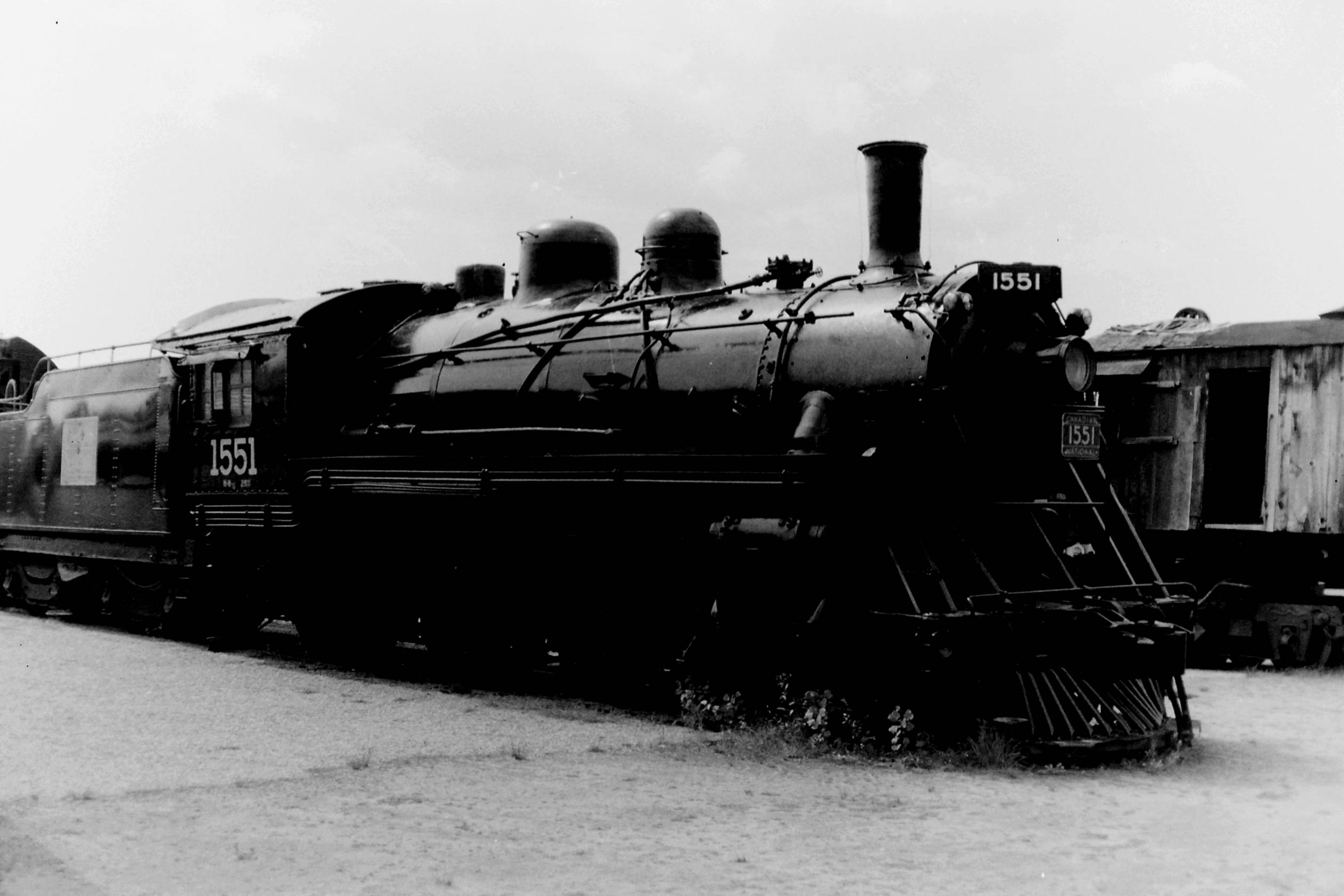
Canadian National Railways 4-6-0 No. 1551 on display at Steamtown U.S.A, August 1970

Around 1912, the Algoma Eastern Railway in Ontario, Canada, acquired Baldwin Locomotive Works #20272, a 4-6-0, which had been built in 1902. The locomotive was scrapped in 1927.

Besides several of the country's smaller railroads, Canada's two largest railroads, the Canadian National Railway and Canadian Pacific Railway also rostered examples of 4-6-0s, some of which have been preserved. Among the more modern examples for both railroads were the Canadian National H-6 and the Canadian Pacific D10.

Today, several Canadian National Railways H-6-g class locomotives are preserved, No. 1392 is preserved at the Alberta Railway Museum while No. 1551 is preserved at the Age of Steam Roundhouse.

=== Denmark ===
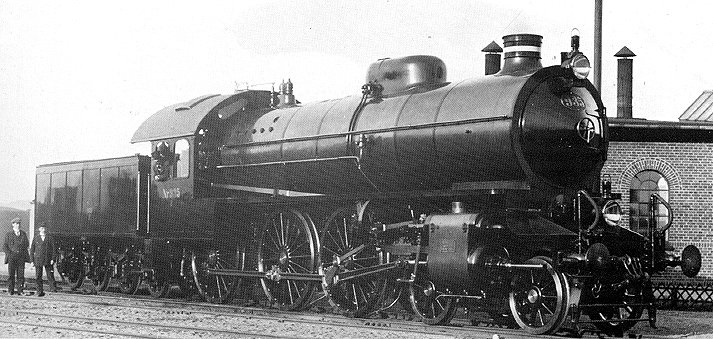
DSB R (I) 935, Borsig 1912

In 1912, DSB or Danish state railways (Danske statsbaner) would receive the first 2 of 30 R class steam locomotives. 2 versions of the class would be built.

- R (I): 20 of this type would be built. They had a 2-cylinder layout.
- R (II): 10 of this type would be built. They had a 3-cylinder layout.

After WWII, DSB would end up with 3 Prussian P8 class 4-6-0 steam locomotives. They would eventually take ownership of them, classifying them as the T class.

=== Finland ===
The Finnish State Railways (Suomen Valtion Rautatiet or SVR, later the Valtionrautatiet or VR) operated the Classes Hk1, Hk2, Hk3, Hk5, Hv1, Hv2, Hv3, Hv4, Hr2 and Hr3 locomotives with a 4-6-0 wheel arrangement.

The Class Hk1, numbers 232 to 241, was built by Baldwin Locomotive Works in 1898. The ten Baldwin locomotives were originally designated H1 class.

Numbers 291 to 300 and 322 to 333 were built by the Richmond Locomotive Works in 1900 and 1901. The 22 Richmond locomotives were originally designated H2 class and were nicknamed Big-Wheel Kaanari. One of them, No. 293, the locomotive that brought Lenin from exile in August–September 1917 prior to the Russian Revolution, was presented by Finland to the Soviet Union on 13 June 1957 and is preserved at the Finland Station in St. Petersburg, Russia.

Another 100 of these locomotives were manufactured in Finland from 1903 to 1916, numbered in the range from 437 to 574 and initially designated H3 to H8 classes.

The Class Hk5 was numbered from 439 to 515. One, No. 497, is preserved at Haapamäki.

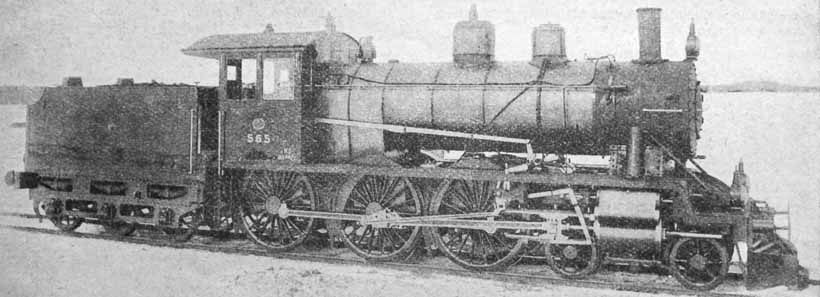
Finnish Class Hv1 4-6-0, built by Tampella in 1915

The Class Hv1 was built from 1915 by Tampella and Lokomo. They were nicknamed Heikki and were numbered 545 to 578 and 648 to 655. The class remained in service until 1967. One, No. 555 named Princess, is preserved at the Finnish Railway Museum.

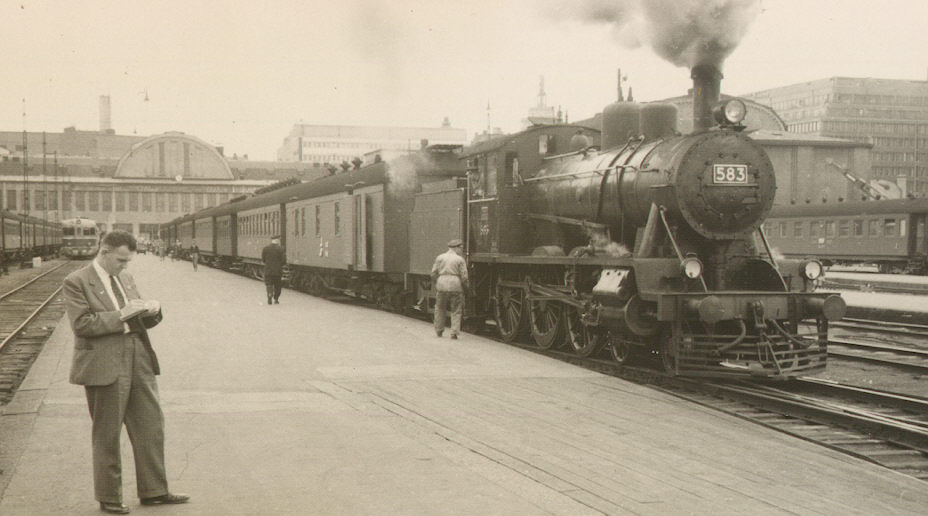
Class Hv2 No. 583 at Helsinki Central station in 1960

The Class Hv2 was built by Berliner Maschinenbau and Lokomo in the years between 1919 and 1926. They were numbered 579 to 593, 671 to 684 and 777 to 780. One, No. 680, is preserved at Haapamäki.

The Class Hv3 was built by Berliner, Tampella and Lokomo in the years from 1921 to 1941. They were numbered 638 to 647, 781 to 785 and 991 to 999. Three Class Hv3 locomotives were preserved, No. 781 at Kerava, No. 995 at Suolahti and No. 998 at Haapamäki.

The Class Hv4 was built by Tampella and Lokomo in the years from 1912 to 1933 and were numbered 516 to 529, 742 to 751 and 757 to 760. Two, numbers 742 and 751, are preserved at Haapamäki.

The Swedish State Railways (Statens Järnvägar or SJ) sold its Class Ta and Tb locomotives to Finland in 1942. At the time, they were not in traffic in Sweden and, since they were purchased by Finland, they were not considered as war assistance. The Class Ta was designated Class Hr2 in Finland while the Class Tb was designated Class Hr3.

- The Class Hr2 was numbered from 1900 to 1906 and had been built by Swedish builders NOHAB (Nydqvist & Holm AB) and Motala Verkstad in the years from 1901 to 1905. They were withdrawn from service in Finland between 1950 and 1953.
- The Class Hr3 was numbered from 1907 to 1919 and had been built in Sweden by NOHAB, Motala, the Vagn & Maskinfabriks AB in Falun and Nya AB Atlas in Stockholm in the years from 1906 to 1908. The Class Hr3 was withdrawn from service in Finland between 1952 and 1953.

=== France ===
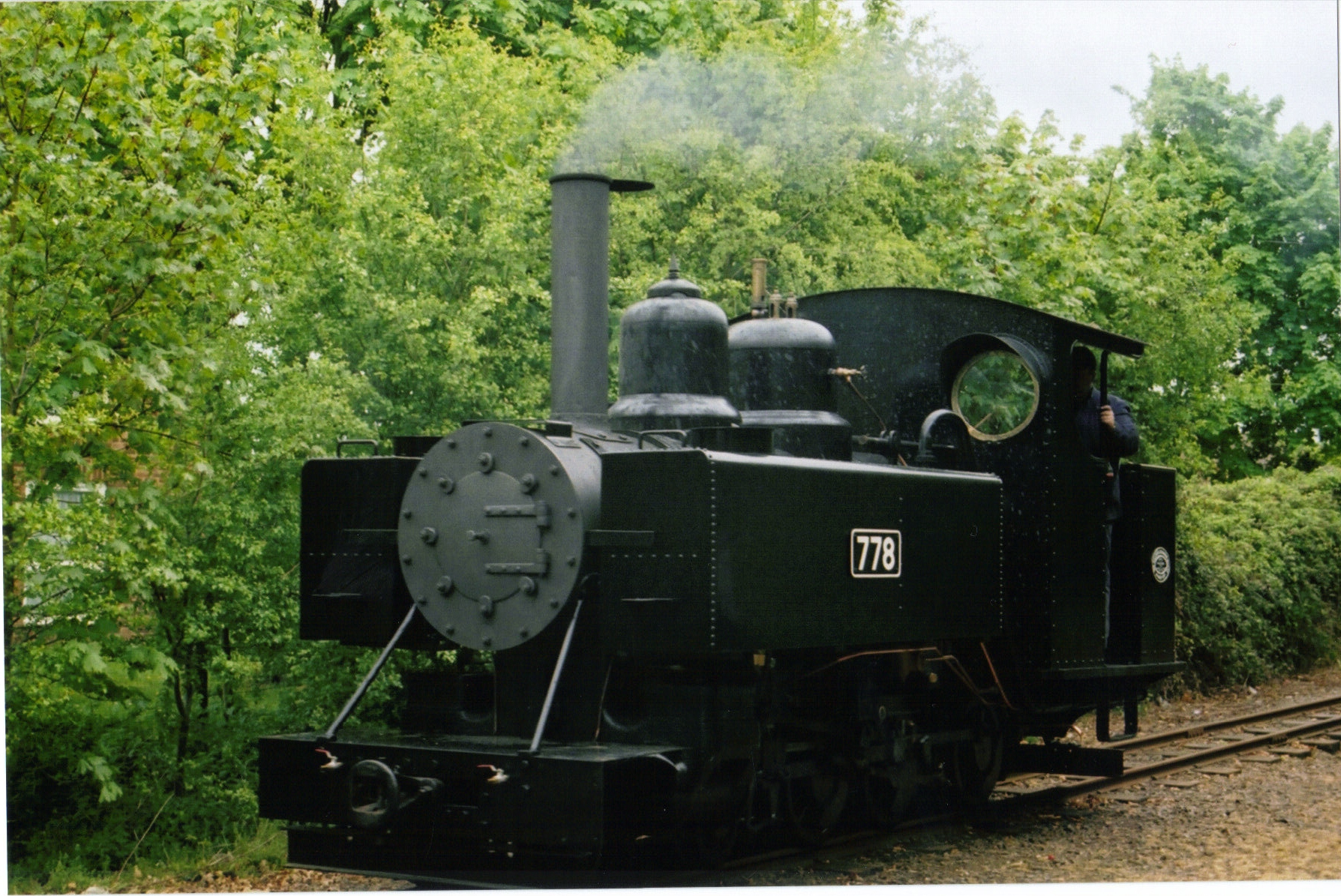
Baldwin Class 10-12-D 4-6-0T No. 778 at the Leighton Buzzard Light Railway

Two 4-6-0 tank locomotive types saw service in France.

The Réseau Breton tank locomotives were a class of 1,000 mm (3 ft 3 3/8 in) metre gauge locomotives of which five were built in 1904 for the Réseau Breton railway by Société Franco-Belge at its Raismes factory. A further seven locomotives were built by Société Alsacienne de Constructions Mécaniques (SACM) at its Belfort plant in France in 1909.

The Baldwin Class 10-12-D 600 mm (1 ft 11 5/8 in) gauge pannier tank locomotives were built in the United States by Baldwin Locomotive Works for the British War Department Light Railways, for service in France in 1916 and 1917 during the First World War. A further batch was built by the American Locomotive Company. After the war, many of these locomotives were sold to work in France, Britain and India.

=== Germany ===
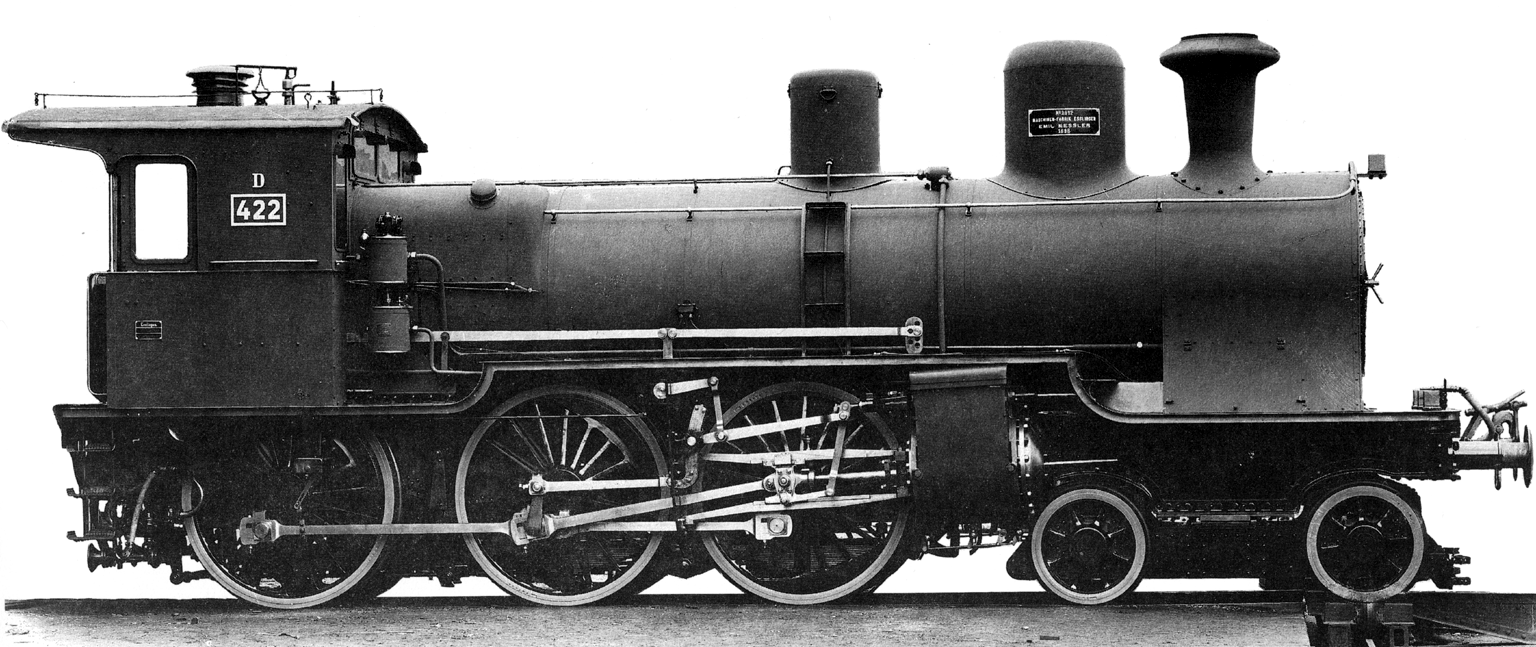
A Württembergian D class 4-6-0 of 1898

The 4-6-0 wheel arrangement was very popular on the railroads of German states from the turn of the 19th and 20th centuries, when they gradually replaced 4-4-0 American type locomotives, initially especially on hilly terrain. In 1925, after the creation of the Deutsche Reichsbahn (DRG), express 4-6-0 passenger locomotives were classified under group 17, while regular 4-6-0 passenger locomotives were classified under group 38.

==== Baden ====
In 1894, Baden adopted its IVe class passenger locomotives of Alfred de Glehn design, the first four-cylinder compound 4-6-0 locomotive ever. Altogether 83 were built and later became the DRG class 38^{70}.

==== Bavaria ====
Bavaria acquired three 4-6-0 express passenger locomotive classes. All were Maffei-built four-cylinder compound locomotives.

- The C V class, of which 43 were built from 1899, later the DRG class 17^{3}.
- The S 3/5N class, of which 39 were built from 1903, later the DRG class 17^{4}.
- The superheated steam S 3/5H class, of which thirty were built from 1906, later the DGR class 17^{5}.

Bavaria only began using 4-6-0 passenger locomotives in 1905.

- The first was the P 3/5 N class, of which 36 were built, later the DRG class 38^{0}.
- After a long break, Bavaria ordered a superheated steam P 3/5 H class in 1921. Eighty of these were built and later became the DRG class 38^{4}.

==== Prussia ====
In 1899, Prussia ordered a short series of 18 De Glehn passenger locomotives that were designated S 7 class.

The most numerous 4-6-0 series in the world was the Prussian P 8 passenger locomotive, later the DRG class 38^{10-40}, of which 3,556 were built for the Prussian state railways and German railways between 1906 and 1923. Of these, 627 locomotives were given to other countries after the First World War. When exports and licensed production in Romania are included, their number reached almost 4000. (Also see § Poland)

Prussia only started to operate 4-6-0 express locomotives of its S 10 family from 1910. While they were externally similar, they differed in engine arrangement.

- The S 10 quadruple (4-cylinder, single expansion) of which 202 were built from 1910, later the DRG class 17^{0-1}.
- The S 10^{1} 4-cylinder compound, of which 237 were built in two batches from 1911 and 1914 (with pre-heater), later the DRG class 17^{10-12}.
- The S 10^{2} 3-cylinder, of which 124 were built from 1914, later the DRG class 17^{2}.

==== Saxony ====
From 1906, Saxony used 4-6-0 express service locomotive classes XII H, XII HV and XII H1, of which 6, 42 and 7 were built respectively. They later became the DRG classes 17^{6}, 17^{7} and 17^{8} respectively. All were superheated steam locomotives, differing mostly in engine arrangements.

More numerous were the Saxon XII H2 class passenger locomotives, of which 169 were built from 1910. They later became the DRG class 38^{2-3}.

==== Württemberg ====
From 1898, the Royal Württemberg State Railways used D class passenger locomotives. It was also a four-cylinder compound locomotive, of which fourteen were built.

=== Indonesia ===
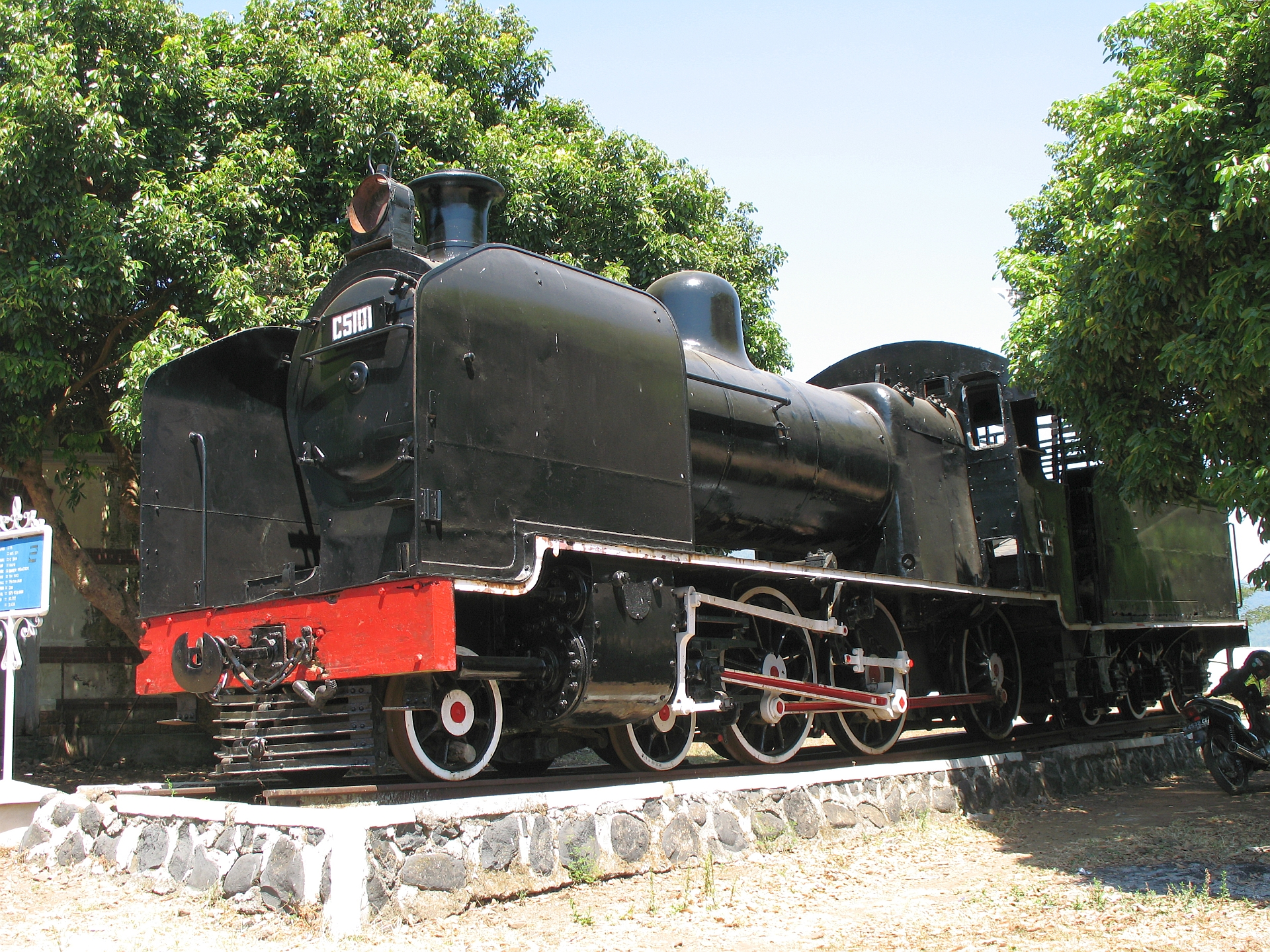
NIS 371 or DKA C51 01 in open air taken in 2008 at Indonesia Railway Museum, Ambarawa, Central Java

Nederlandsch-Indische Spoorweg Maatschappij (NIS) received 10 units of the first superheated 4-6-0 long-range runner for 3 ft 6 in (1,067 mm) from Beyer, Peacock and Company, Manchester. These locos were come in 1913, and classified as NIS Class 370 (371-380). After arriving in Java, these locomotives worked as an effort to pursue the target of taking the Gundih–Surabaya with a travel time of approximately 7 hours. 4 units worked on Batavia (Jakarta)–Buitenzorg (Bogor) for express trains. While the rest of the 6 were used on Soerabaia NIS (Surabaya Pasar Turi)–Gundih line and allocated in Cepu depot, Central Java. The NIS 370 class locomotives also underwent technical and design improvements so that it was able to reach a maximum speed of 75 kilometres per hour (47 miles per hour) which was much faster than the original speed of only around 60 kilometres per hour (37 miles per hour).

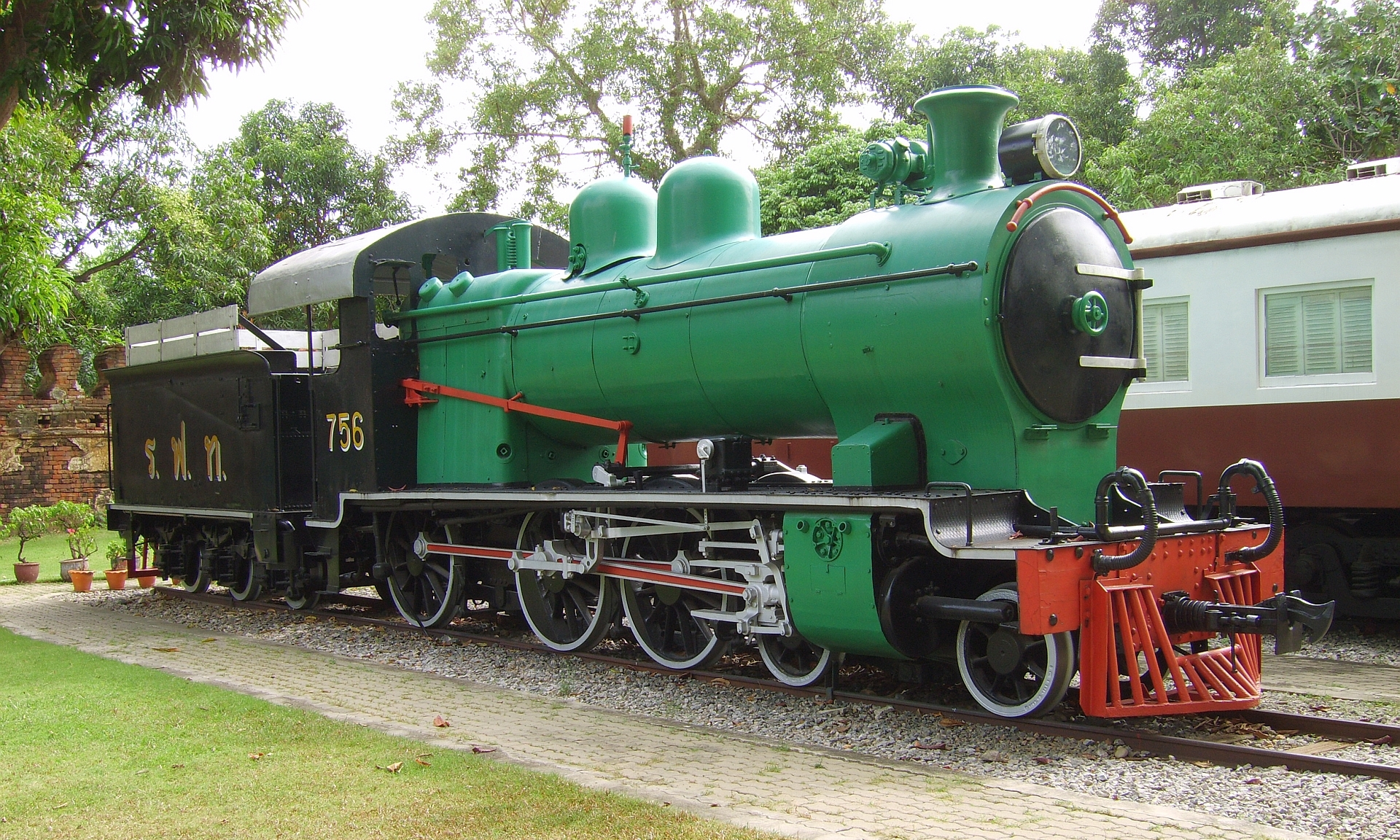
SRT 751 or C52 17 at Army Engineering Museum, Thailand

Apart from being used to pull express trains, the NIS 370s were also used to haul freight trains. This freight train contains petroleum from Koloniale Petroleum Verkoop Mij. (KPVM). KPVM was a part of the NKPM company (Nederlandsche Koloniale Petroleum Maatschappij). Not quite a long, NIS also imported 20 more 4-6-0 locomotives with similar characteristics to the NIS Class 370 but with some improvements from 3 different builders. At first batch, they received 5 units from Werkspoor, N.V. (Netherlands) in 1918-1919. Then, the second batch consisting of 5 units from Henschel & Son (Germany) in 1921. At last, 10 units from Werkspoor and Beyer, Peacock and Company finally came in 1922 to serve the increase of passenger traffics. Soon, the new upgraded 4-6-0 superheater locomotives were classified as NIS Class 381 (381-400) and worked on Semarang Tawang–Cepu–Soerabaia NIS and Semarang Tawang–Vorstenlanden (Surakarta and Jogja Lempuyangan) lines. In 1935, NIS received the concession to upgrade their mainline from Soerabaia to Semarang which was tram line becoming 2nd class railway line. NIS 381–400 once reached a speed of up to 105 kilometres per hour (65 miles per hour) during some series of tests, making it the fastest locomotive fleet owned by NIS at that time. During Japanese occupation of the Dutch East Indies in 1942, all of Dutch East Indies private / state-owned railway locomotives were renumbered based on Japanese numberings. The NIS 370s were renumbered to C51, while the NIS 380s became C52. It could be said that C52s were the missing class of locomotives because almost all of them were sent by Japanese and Dutch to various countries in the Indochina and Malay Peninsula regions during war period and were never operated again after Indonesian independence and they also lack of documentations. Many were sent to Malaya, Cambodia, Thailand and had been scrapped in 1949-1950s because they had been re-gauged to 1,000 mm. From 20 of them, only C52 17 (ex-NIS 397) is preserved in Army Engineering Museum, Ratchaburi, Thailand. While the C51s were so lucky because they remained in service in Java during the war. From 10 of them, only C51 01 is preserved in Ambarawa Railway Museum, Central Java.

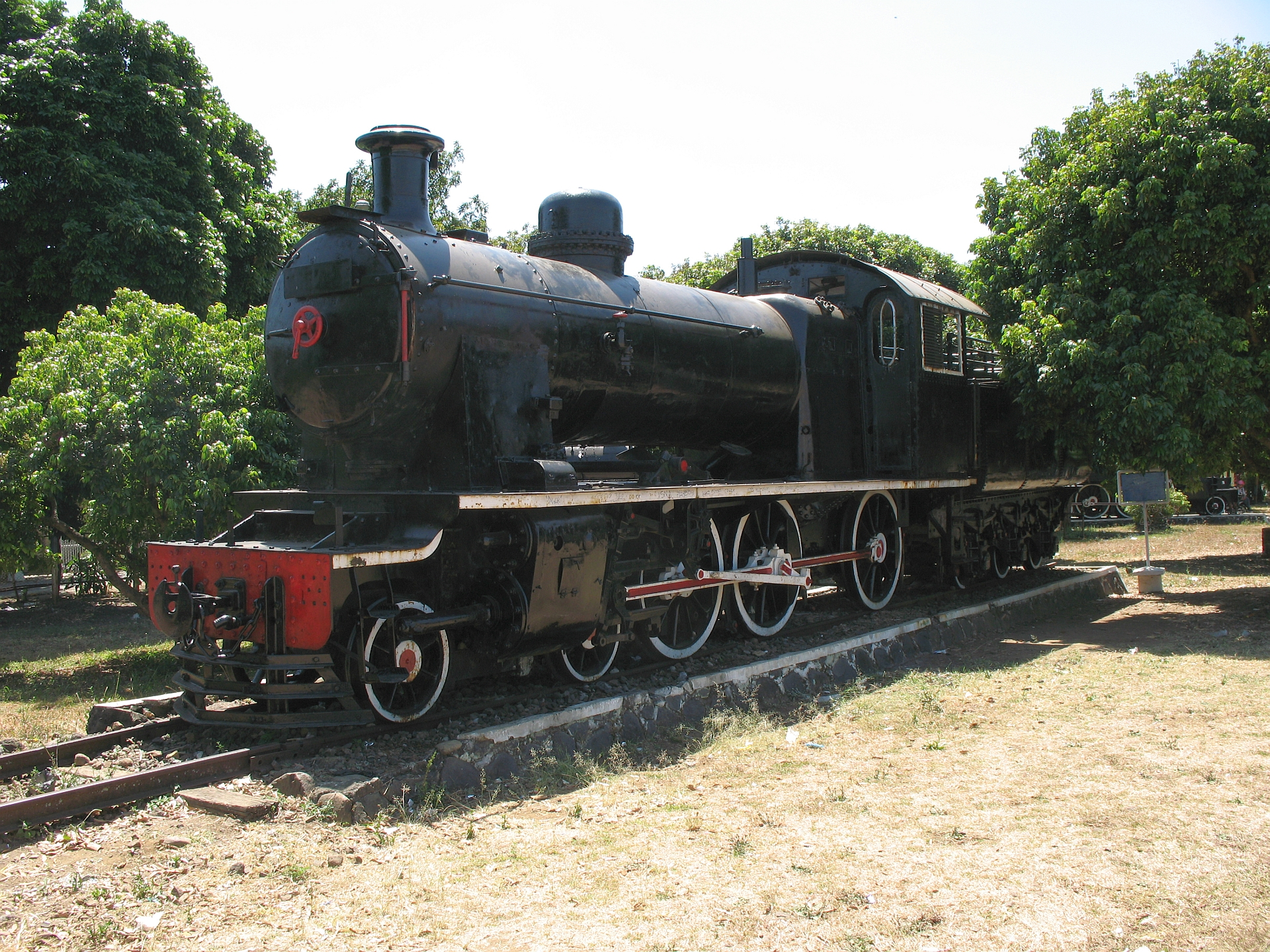
SCS 217 or DKA C54 17 at Indonesia Railway Museum, Central Java

On the other hand, Samarang–Cheribon Stoomtram Mij. (SCS) or Samarang–Cheribon Steam Tramway imported 19 units of superheated 4-6-0s, consisting of 13 from Hartmann, Chemnitz and 6 from Beyer, Peacock and Company, Manchester in 1922, classified as SCS Class 200 (201–219) and worked both for freight and express trains on north coastline of Semarang–Cheribon which was connected to Staatsspoorwegen's (SS) line to Batavia. This line was completed on November 1, 1914 to support the transportation of passengers and freights, especially on the north coast of Java. Some cities like Semarang, Pekalongan, Tegal and Cheribon, there were 54 sugar mills operating at that time. The completion of this line construction was also made an increase in the volume of freights and number of passengers transported. By 1912-1921, just before receiving 4-6-0 engines, SCS had improved the quality of their line, especially on the Cirebon–Semarang which is 226 kilometres (140 miles) away with the aim to increase the speed limits of their trains. Speed limit for trains on the Cirebon–Semarang route had been changed from 59 kilometres per hour (37 miles per hour) to 75 kilometres per hour (47 miles per hour). With the improvement in the quality of this rail line, the SCS 200s with express trains could serve passengers traveling from Batavia to Semarang in just 7 hours. Passengers first have a transit at Cheribon which owned by SS, then they continue using SCS trains to Semarang. During Japanese occupation, all SCS Class 200 were renumbered to C54 class and around 4 units of them were moved to Sumatra to serve the Muaro (West Sumatra)–Pekanbaru (Riau) train transport line. This locomotive was tested to haul the transport coal train from coal mines in West Sumatra. Of the 19 units of C54, there are currently 2 remaining, a C54 with unknown individual number and C5417, C5417 (from Beyer Peacock) is preserved at the Ambarawa Railway Museum, Central Java. Meanwhile, the unidentified C54 locomotive is abandoned in the forest in Tutup Kain Selatan, Kampar Regency, Riau with its incomplete physical condition.

=== Ireland ===
The only Irish railways to use the 4-6-0 type were the Great Southern & Western Railway (GS&WR) and its larger successor, Great Southern Railways (GSR). The GS&WR had 4-6-0s for both fast freight and express passenger service. The culmination of Irish 4-6-0 design was the GSR Class 800 or B1a class, introduced in 1939. Three of these locomotives were built for top express passenger work on the Dublin-Cork mainline, coincidentally resembling the LMS' "Royal Scot" Class as rebuilt by William Stanier. They were the last new steam locomotives to be built for the GSR.

=== Myanmar (Burma) ===
The Burma Railways (BR) had two types of 4-6-0 locomotives in its roster, which were all standard designs of the British Engineering Standards Association (BESA) for British Indian railways. The J class locomotives, introduced in 1904, were of the standard BESA 4-6-0 passenger engine design, and the K class locomotives, introduced in the same year, were of the standard BESA 4-6-0 mixed traffic engine design. Their superheated counterparts were designated class Js and class Ks, respectively.

During World War II, Ks class locomotive 396 was captured by Japanese occupation forces who had just overran the country and sent it to Thailand, who also had similar BESA 4-6-0 locomotives. After the war, the Ks remained in Thailand until 1954, its year of scrapping. In Burma proper, the war-torn Burma Railways, severely devastated by the wartime fighting in the country, had 8 J class and 31 K class locomotives rostered on the BR after the war in May 1947, reduced from their original numbers.

=== New Zealand ===
The New Zealand Railways Department built its first home-built tender locomotives in 1894, using the 4-6-0 wheel arrangement. Designated as the "U" class their production run lasted for a decade and produced only nine locomotives. Lack of colonial capacity resulted in an order for units built in the United Kingdom - but production delays led to a batch of ten Baldwin-built locomotives being ordered - which were promptly delivered. When the half-dozen Sharp Stewart examples entered service the designation in the annual locomotive returns became the "Colonial U", "American U", and "English U" even though the Sharp Stewarts were built in Scotland.

Another Baldwin batch and Sharp Stewart batch arrived into service in 1901, along with a sample from Richmond and another sample from Brooks - although the ALCO merger occurred before delivery. With the proliferation of batches the classification became "U" for the colonial-built examples, "Ua" for the early Sharp Stewarts, "Ub" for all American-built locomotives, and "Uc" for the second batch of Sharp Stewarts.

The Baldwins were considered free steamers and were for a time the best locomotives in the colony. The Brooks was highly regarded. The Richmond was not successful. The Sharp Stewarts and colonial locomotives were more finely built than the Baldwins - but poorer steamers. The colonial locomotives were never successful in mainline work - they subsequently became a useful branchline locomotive.

By 1901 the introduction of "Pacific" types began to push the Ten-Wheelers into second-tier service. The combination of standardisation and the Great Depression saw the Ua, early Ub, and the sample locomotives scrapped. The later Ub and Uc classes lasted until 1957 - but were scrapped whenever uneconomic repairs were needed, and also because dieselisation had begun to displace more modern steam locomotives into what had been their territory. Even in their last years, the Sharp Stewarts did primarily passenger duty because they didn't have the hauling ability for freight work when compared to the Baldwins.

The privately owned Wellington and Manawatu Railway purchased two Ten-Wheelers from Baldwin in 1904. In 1908 they were acquired by the Government and became the Ud Class. They were also a victim of standardisation and were scrapped when repairs were required - the last being written off in 1931. In all, NZGR had forty-nine of 4-6-0 locomotives, from five manufacturers, built over eleven years to nine different standards.

=== Norway ===
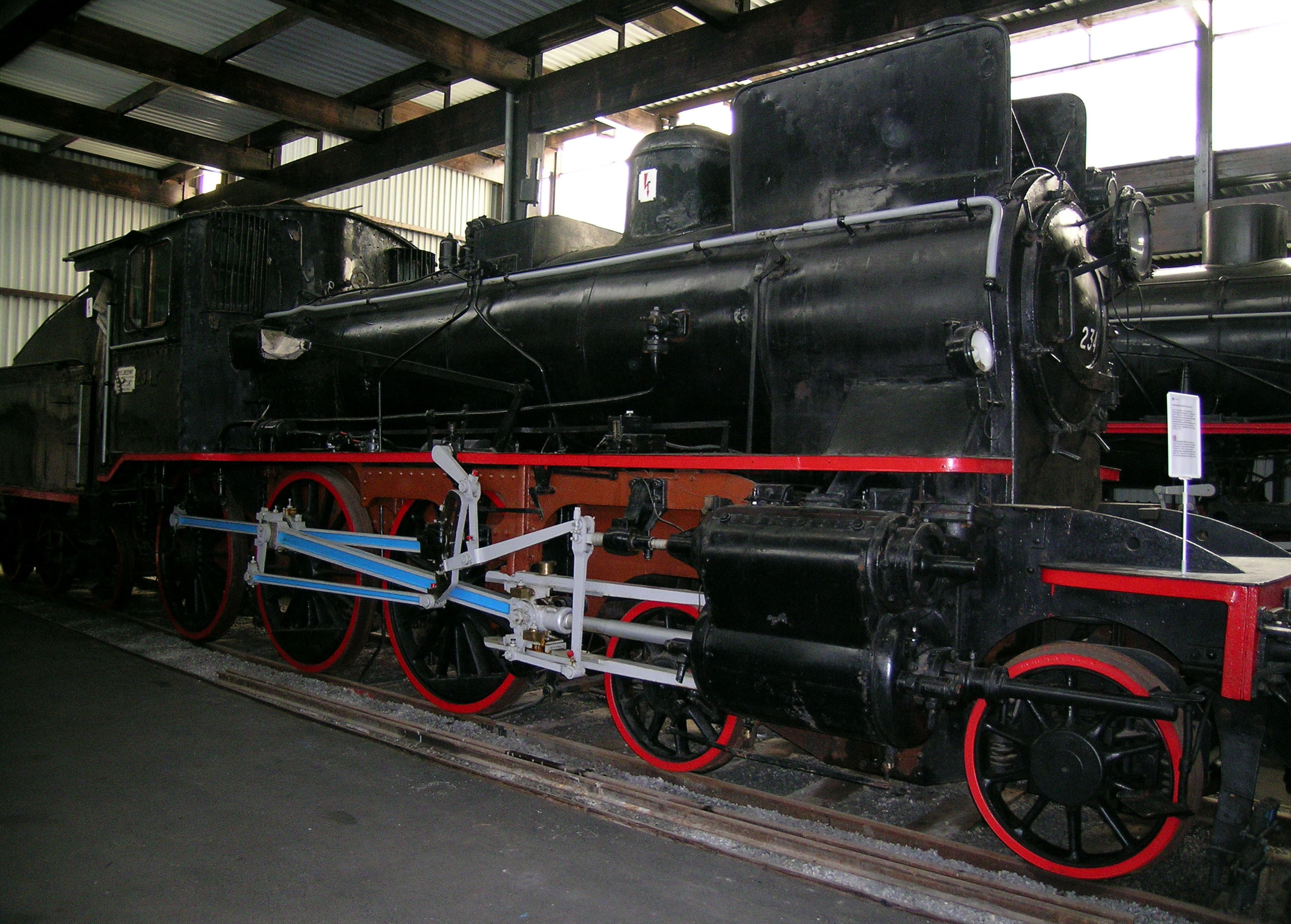
NSB Class 27

In 1879, the Norwegian State Railways, the Smaalensbanen and Merakerbanen, received four ten-wheelers with three-axled tenders from Baldwin Locomotive Works which were the first 4-6-0s in Europe.

=== Poland ===
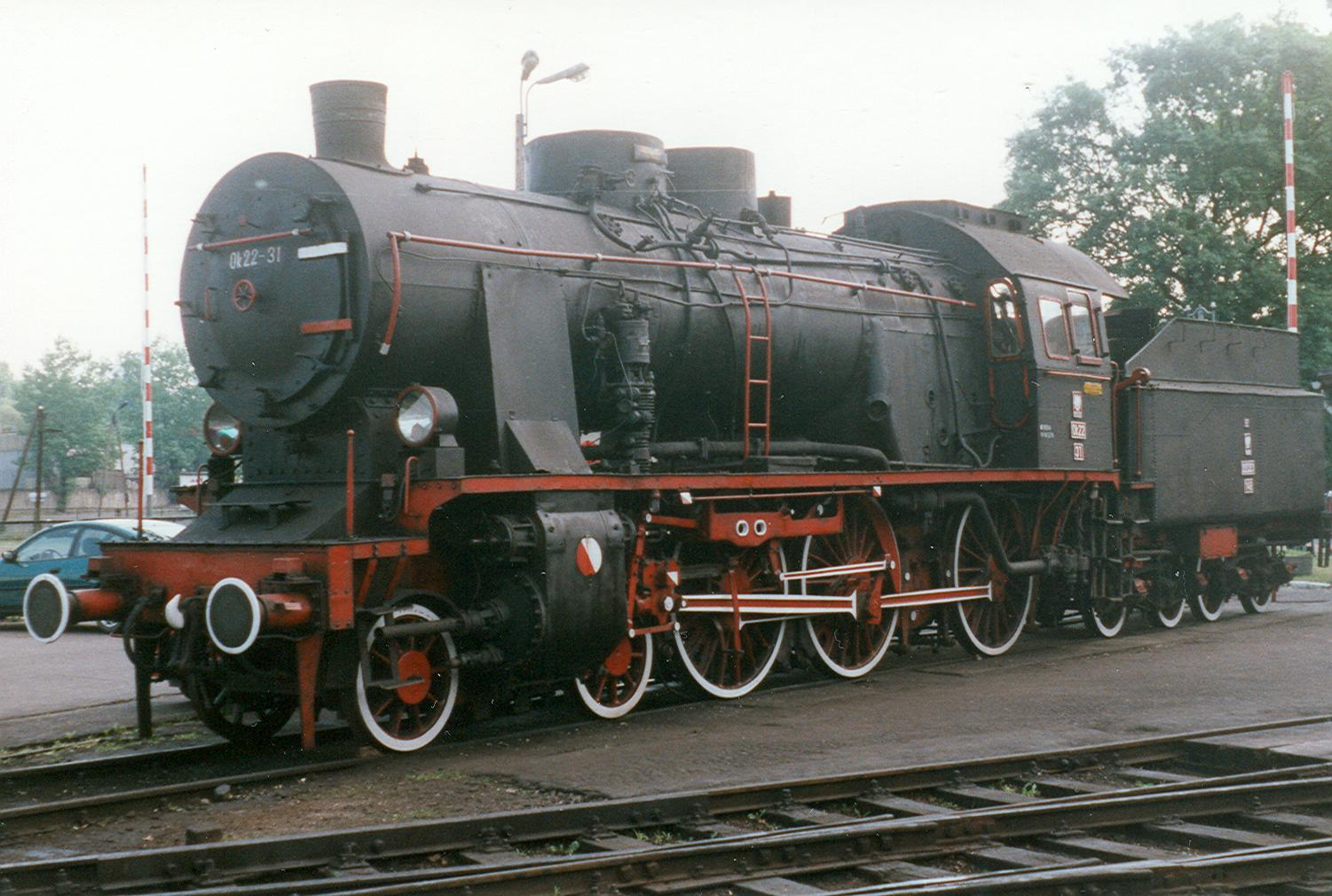
Polish class Ok22

The Polish State Railways (PKP) used several classes of Prussian and other German 4-6-0 locomotives. The most significant of these was the Prussian P 8, classified in Poland as the PKP class Ok1. After the First World War, Poland received as reparations and also bought altogether 257 of these locomotives. After the Second World War, their number rose to 429 locomotives, which made it the most numerous passenger locomotive in Poland. A few were preserved and kept in working condition, including Class Ok1 No. 359. (Also see Germany - Prussia)

A significant number of the Prussian S 10 family of express passenger locomotives were also used in Poland. There were 52 in total, classified as Pk1, Pk2 and Pk3.

During the inter-war period, a PKP class Ok22 locomotive was designed in cooperation with German builders Hanomag. It was basically an improved class Ok1 with a more efficient boiler. Altogether 190 of them were produced for the PKP, of which all but five were manufactured in Poland.

=== Romania ===
After WWI, Romania received as war reparations 18 Prussian P 8 locomotives (classified as the CFR 230.000 Class), and then imported other 127 units for Căile Ferate Române (CFR), in 1921–1930. Further 226 locomotives were licence-manufactured in Romania by Reșița works (between 1932 and 1936), and Malaxa (1932-1939).

=== Russia ===
4-6-0 passenger locomotives became quite popular in Russia at the turn of the 20th century. While the locomotives originally had separate class designations on each Russian railroad, common Russian class designations were introduced in 1912. The Russian 4-6-0s were the A, A^{D}_{K}, A^{D}, A^{V}, V, Zh, Z, G, U, K, B and K^{U} classes.

- The first and most numerous class was the Vladicaucasian Railway's A class, in the A^{D}_{K}, A^{D} and, the most numerous, A^{V} series. It was a Kolomna factory design, of which 533 were built for several railroads in several Russian and German factories from 1892 until 1907. All were two-cylinder compound locomotives with 1,830-millimetre (72 in) diameter coupled wheels.
- In 1896, 88 Baldwin-built four-cylinder Vauclain compound locomotives were introduced, designated V class (V for Vauclain, В in Russian).
- Also from 1896, Henschel-designed locomotives were introduced. Altogether 210 were built from 1896 to 1909, fourteen by Henschel and the rest in Russia. They were two-cylinder compound locomotives with 1,700-millimetre (67 in) diameter coupled wheels and were regarded as a more successful design than the A class. These locomotives were later designated as the Zh class (Ж in Russian). A development of the Zh class was the superheated Z class (З in Russian), of which 24 were built from 1902.
- From 1901 to 1903, stronger passenger locomotives were built, the G class (Г in Russian). These locomotives were of Vladicaucasian Railway and Bryansk factory design. Of these, 39 were built for the Vladicaucasian Railway and another 85 for Eastern Chinese railroads. They were two-cylinder compound locomotives with 1,730-millimetre (68 in) diameter coupled wheels. Some of these locomotives were later retrofitted with superheaters.
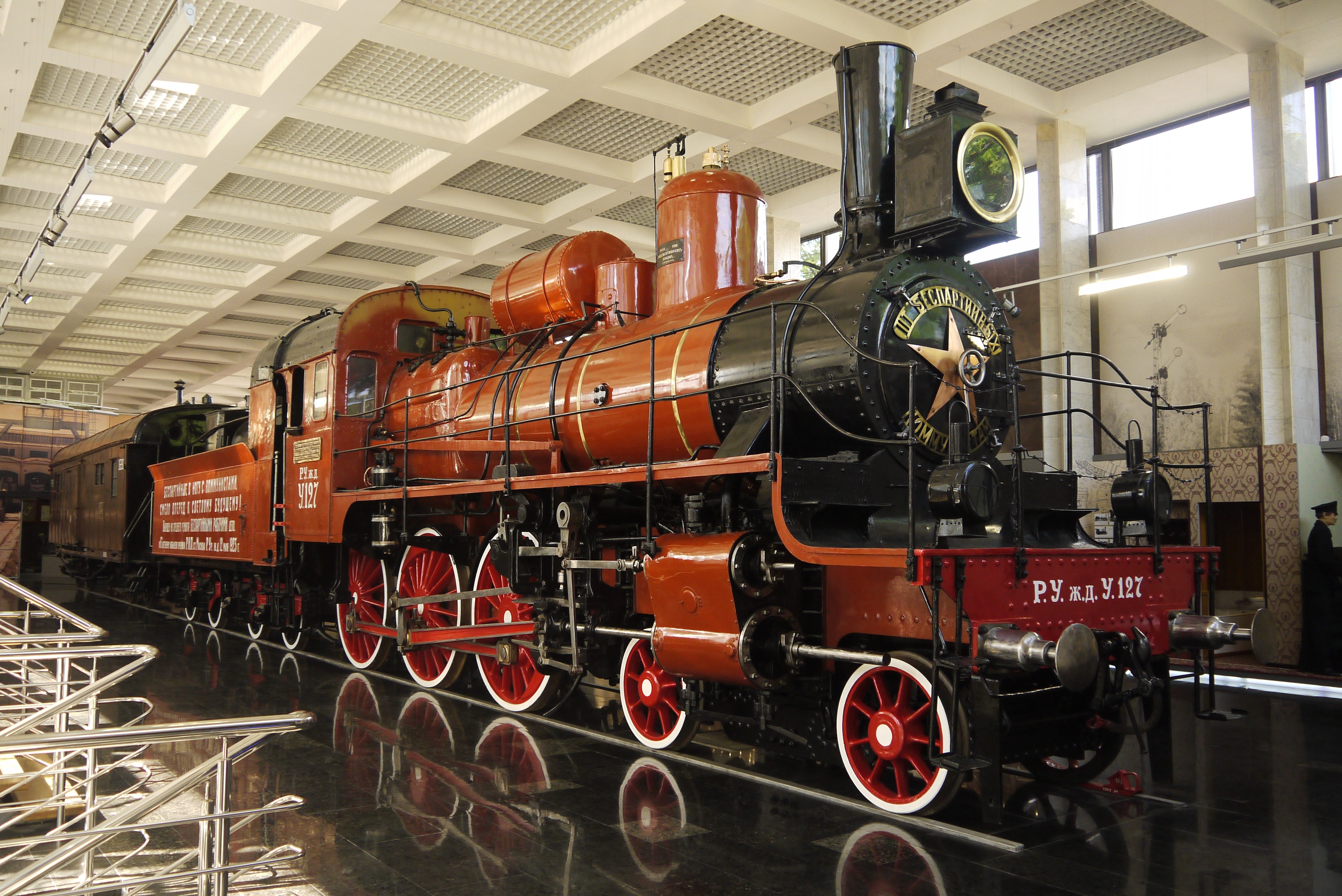
- U class U-127, Lenin's locomotive, at the Museum of the Moscow Railway
  The class U (У in Russian) was a four-cylinder oil-burning De Glehn compound locomotive which first appeared in 1906, initially on the Ryazan-Ural railroad. Of these, 62 were built at the Kirov Plant between 1906 and 1916. By the beginning of 1940, the inventory still listed 47 U class locomotives and the last of them were withdrawn in 1952. Lenin's locomotive, U class No. U-127 that was used during his funeral, is preserved at the Museum of the Moscow Railway.
- Altogether 145 heavier superheated K-class (К in Russian) passenger locomotives were built between 1907 and 1912. They were of Kolomna factory design and were two-cylinder simple expansion (simplex) locomotives with 1,700-millimetre (67 in) diameter coupled wheels.
- At the same time, the Briansk factory designed an improved superheated development of the G class that was produced between 1907 and 1914 as the B class (Б in Russian). Altogether 252 were built in Briansk and Lugansk. They were two-cylinder simplex locomotives with 1,830 millimetres (72 in) diameter coupled wheels that were quite successful in express work.
- Between 1911 and 1914, Kolomna built 39 stronger K^{U} class locomotives (К^{У} in Russian) with 1,900-millimetre (75 in) diameter coupled wheels for faster trains.

=== South Africa ===
Eighteen classes of 4-6-0 locomotives saw service in South Africa, sixteen on 3 ft 6 in (1,067 mm) Cape gauge and two on 2 ft (610 mm) narrow gauge. Of these, only two were conventional tank locomotives, while two others were delivered as tank-and-tender locomotives with optional tenders.

==== Cape gauge ====
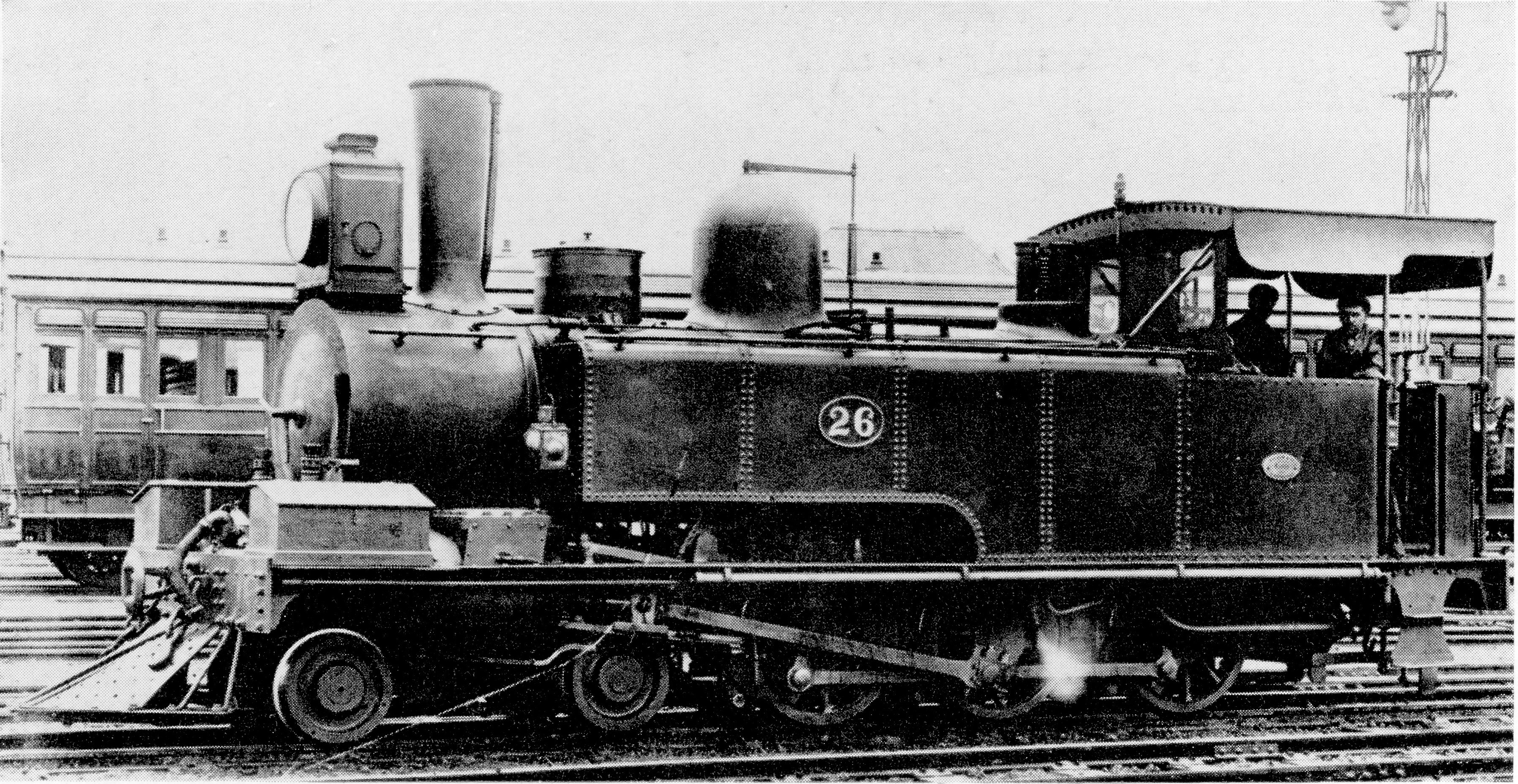
NGR Class G No. 26, c. 1900

Between 1879 and 1885, the Natal Government Railways (NGR) placed 37 4-6-0 tank locomotives in service. Of these, 18 were built by Kitson and Company and 19 by Stephenson. On the NGR they were designated Class G. When the SAR was established in 1912, the 15 unmodified survivors were designated Class C. The last one was withdrawn from service in the mid-1980s, after more than 105 years in service.

In 1880 and 1881, the Cape Government Railways (CGR) placed 18 4th Class tank-and-tender locomotives in mainline service on its Midland System working out of Port Elizabeth and Eastern System working out of East London. Four of these locomotives were still in service when the South African Railways was established in 1912.

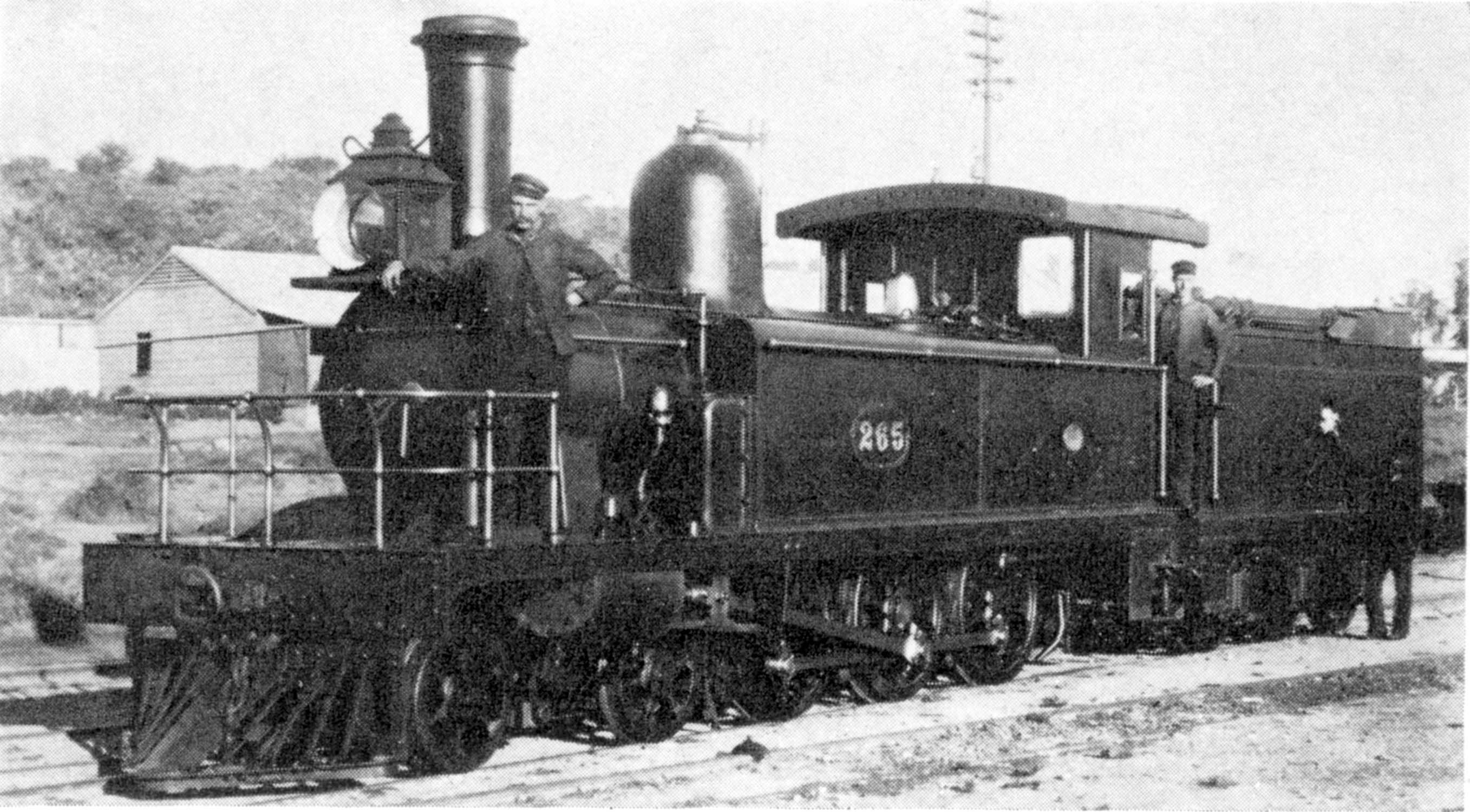
Stephenson-built CGR 4th Class

In 1882 and 1883, the CGR placed 68 4th Class 4-6-0 tank-and-tender locomotives in mainline service on all three systems. It was an improved version of the 4th Class locomotives of 1880 with larger coupled wheels, built by two manufacturers. Robert Stephenson and Company built 33 with Stephenson valve gear, while Neilson and Company built 35 with Joy valve gear. Of these locomotives, 26 were still in service when the South African Railways was established in 1912.

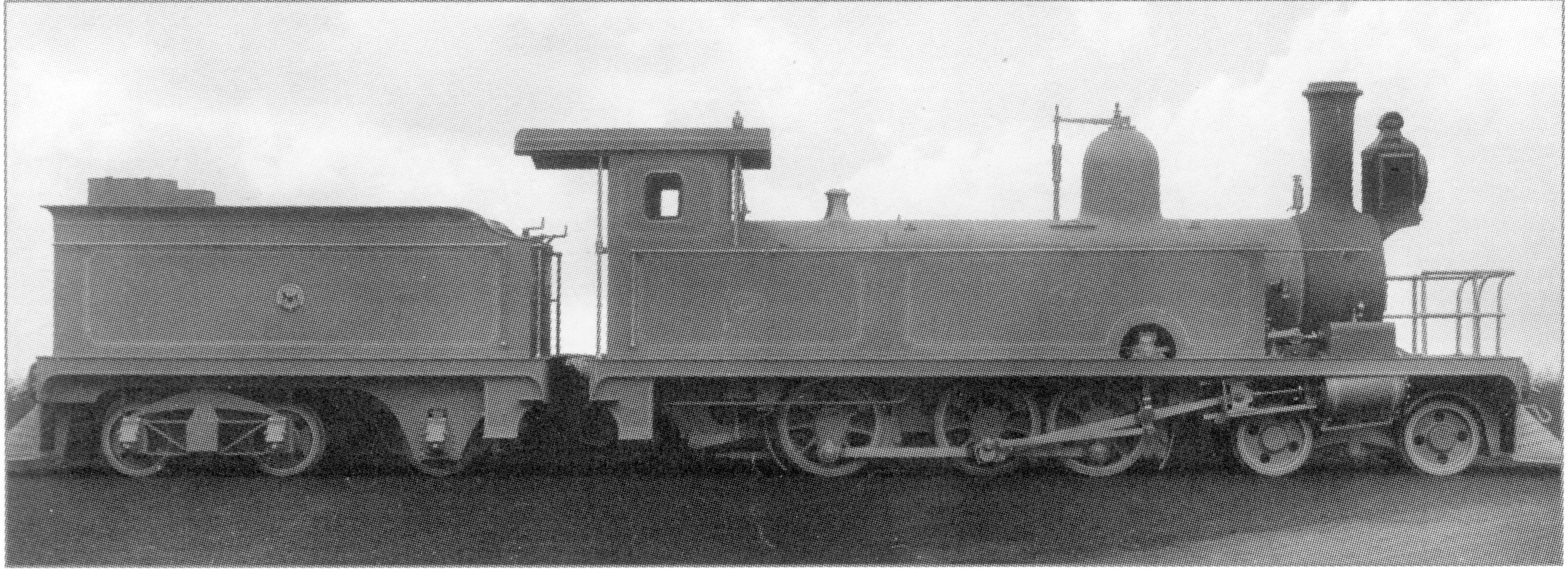
CGR experimental 4th Class

Four tank-and-tender locomotives of the CGR's Experimental 4th Class were supplied by Neilson in 1884, built to the design of J.D. Tilney, Locomotive Superintendent of the Cape Eastern System at the time, to be able to use low-grade local coal. They had Joy valve gear and unusual six-wheeled tenders, with the leading axle mounted in a rigid frame and the other two axles mounted in a bogie. One of the locomotives survived until 1912 and was designated SAR Class 04 as an obsolete locomotive.

The first twenty of the CGR 5th Class tender locomotives were delivered from Dübs and Company in 1890. In 1891, the CGR placed a second batch of thirty 5th Class tender locomotives in mainline service on all three Cape Systems. They were similar to the previous batch of 1890, but differed in respect of the diameter of their coupled wheels, the length of their smokeboxes and their tractive effort. In 1912, when the South African Railways (SAR) was established, the survivors were considered obsolete and designated Class 05. Nevertheless, some of the Class 05 locomotives survived as shunting engines in SAR service for another four decades. They were the last obsolete locomotives to be still in service when they were eventually withdrawn in 1953.

The Cape 6th Class passenger locomotive was designed at the Salt River works of the CGR according to the specifications of Michael Stephens, then Chief Locomotive Superintendent of the CGR, and under the supervision of H.M. Beatty, then Locomotive Superintendent of the Cape's Western System. It was to become one of the most useful classes to see service in South Africa. In 1912, when they came into SAR stock, the 6th Class 4-6-0 family was reclassified into twelve separate classes.

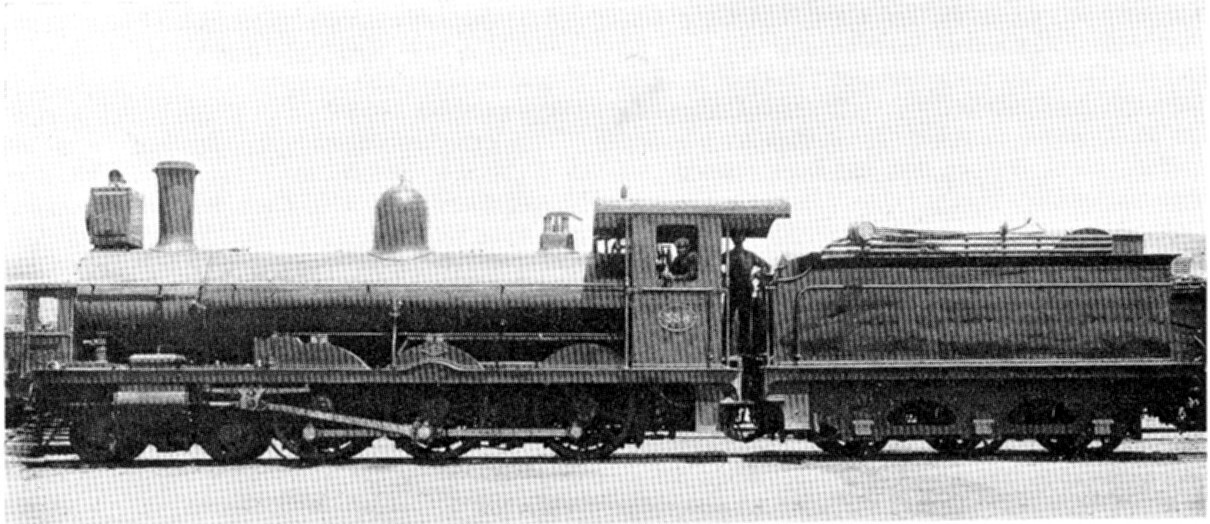
Class 6, as delivered with a round-topped firebox and three-axle tender

- In 1893 and 1894, the CGR placed forty 6th Class locomotives in service, built by Dübs. Ten of them, sold to the Oranje-Vrijstaat Gouwerment-Spoorwegen (OVGS) in 1897, eventually became the Class 6-L1 on the CSAR. In 1912, all forty were assimilated into the SAR and retained their Class 6 designation. (Also see Sudan)
- In 1896 and 1897, the CGR acquired a second batch of fifty, built by Dübs and Sharp, Stewart and Company. These locomotives differed from the previous order in having slightly larger boilers with an increased heating surface and higher coal capacity tenders. In 1907, one was sold to the Benguela Railway in Angola. The remaining 49 locomotives were designated Class 6A on the SAR in 1912. (Also see Angola - Cape gauge and Sudan)
- Between 1896 and 1898, the OVGS placed 24 new Cape Class 6 locomotives in service, built by Dübs, Neilson and Sharp, Stewart. During the Second Boer War, these locomotives were taken over by the Imperial Military Railways (IMR) and after the war they became the CSAR Class 6-L2. All but one were assimilated into the SAR in 1912 and were designated Class 6C. (Also see Sudan)
- In 1897 and 1898, the CGR placed a third batch of 55 in service, built by Dübs, Neilson and Company and Neilson, Reid and Company. They were virtually identical to the previous fifty, except that they had bogie-wheeled tenders. In 1907, four were sold to the Benguela Railway in Angola. The remaining 51 locomotives were designated Class 6B in 1912. (Also see Angola – Cape gauge and Sudan)

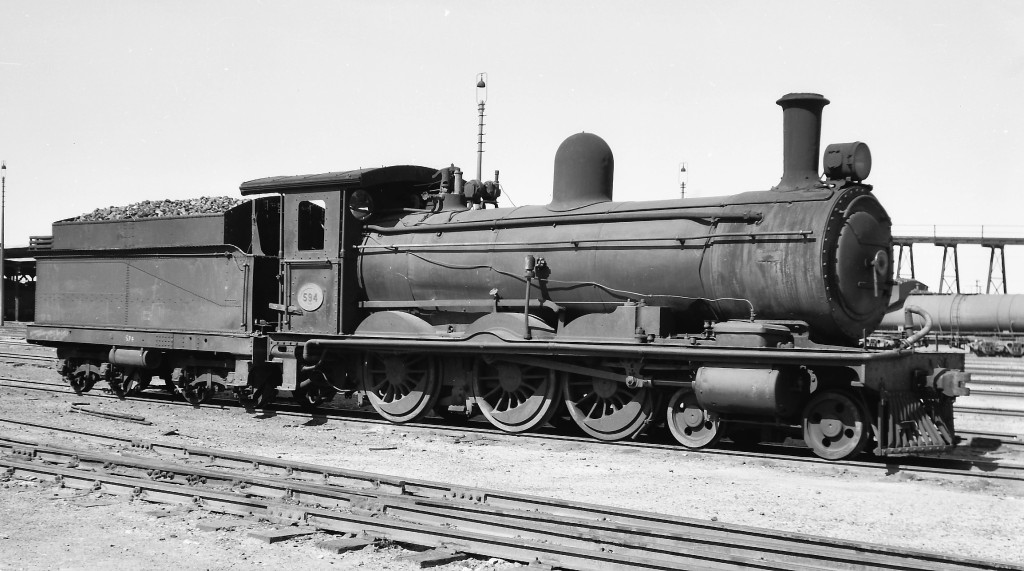
SAR Class 6D

- In 1898, a fourth batch of 33 were placed in service by the CGR, built by Neilson, Reid. These represented a further advance on earlier 6th Class locomotives, with a greater heating surface and a larger grate area. In 1912, they were designated Class 6D on the SAR. (Also see Sudan)
- Also in 1898, the OVGS ordered its final six new Cape 6th Class locomotives from Sharp, Stewart. These were delivered with larger cabs than their predecessors and with bogie-wheeled tenders. They were also taken over by the IMR and, after the war, came into the CSAR as Class 6-L3. In 1912, they became Class 6E on the SAR.
- In 1900, two redesigned 6th Class locomotives entered service on the CGR, built by Sharp, Stewart. They had bar frames, larger cabs and bogie-wheeled tenders, and their larger heating surfaces and grate areas allowed a higher boiler pressure rating of 180 pounds per square inch (1,240 kilopascals). In visual appearance, they differed from all previous 6th Class locomotives by having higher running boards without driving wheel fairings. In 1912, they were classified as Class 6F on the SAR.

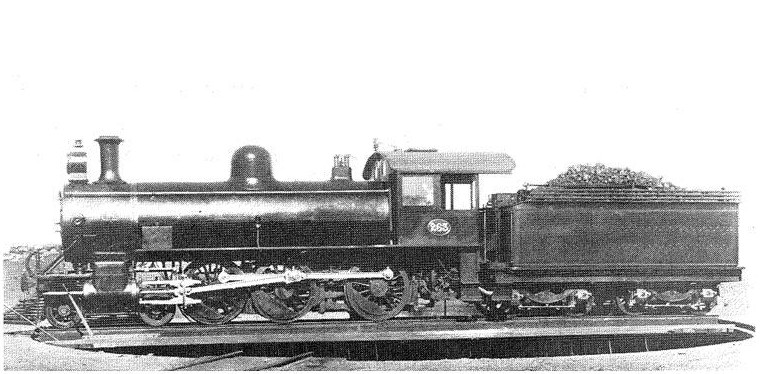
Schenectady-built 6th Class

- In 1901, eight 6th Class locomotives entered service, redesigned and built by the Schenectady Locomotive Works to the specifications of the CGR. Also built on bar frames like the previous two and similar in appearance, they were larger, with larger boilers and 17 1/2 inches (444 millimetres) diameter cylinders compared to the 17 inches (432 millimetres) of all earlier 6th Class locomotives. In 1912, they became Class 6G on the SAR.
- Also in 1901, a batch of 21 entered service on the CGR, built by Neilson, Reid to the older plate frame design, but with a larger cab. These also reverted to the 17 inches (432 millimetres) diameter cylinders of the previous British-built locomotives, with the lower running boards with driving wheel fairings. One of them was experimental, being equipped with Drummond cross-water tubes in the firebox. However, since the tubes were inclined to leak and were difficult to maintain, they were soon removed. In 1912, these locomotives became the Class 6H on the SAR.
- Ten bar-framed locomotives were placed in service, also in 1901, designed and built by the Baldwin Locomotive Works to the specifications of the CGR. They were larger than any of the previous 6th Class locomotives, with larger boilers, large cabs, cylinders of 17 1/2 inches (444 millimetres) bore, bar frames, stovepipe chimneys, large domes and high running boards without driving wheel fairings. In 1912, they became Class 6K on the SAR.

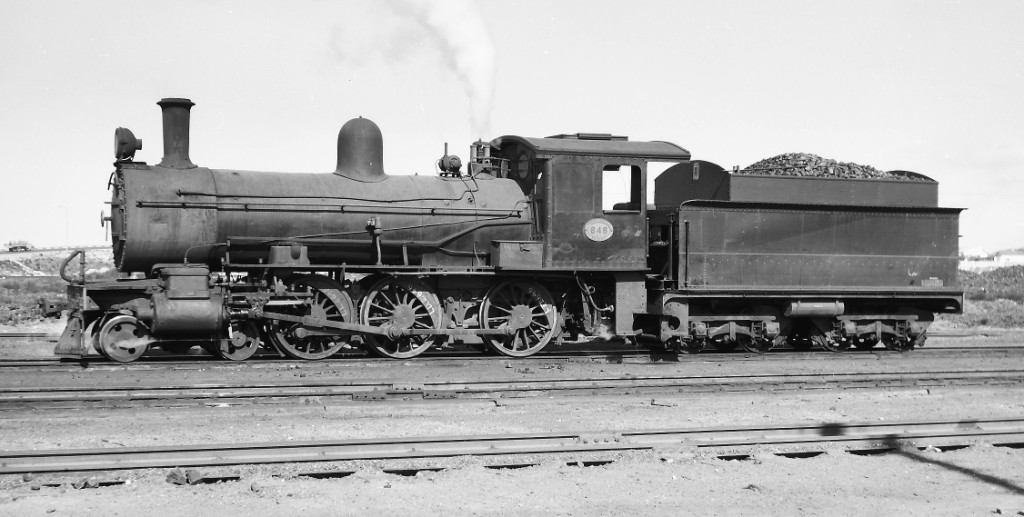
SAR Class 6J No. 646

- In 1902, fourteen bar-framed 6th Class locomotives entered service on the CGR, built by Neilson, Reid. They were practically identical to the two bar-framed locomotives built by Sharp, Stewart in 1900, with high running boards without driving wheel fairings. In 1912, they were designated Class 6J on the SAR.
- In 1904, the CGR placed its last two 6th Class bar-framed locomotives in service, built by the North British Locomotive Company (NBL). They were experimental and were the first South African locomotives to have piston valves and superheaters. The pistons, with a diameter of 18 1/2 inches (470 millimetres), were the largest yet used on the 6th Class. The Schmidt superheater was of the smokebox type, but the arrangement was extremely complicated and not very successful. In 1912, they became the Class 6L on the SAR and in 1915, when they were reboilered, the superheaters were removed to convert them to saturated steam locomotives. At the same time the piston-valve cylinders were replaced with smaller slide-valve cylinders of 17 1/2 inches (444 millimetres) bore.

In 1897, the Pretoria-Pietersburg Railway in the Zuid-Afrikaansche Republiek (Transvaal Republic) purchased a 35 Tonner tank locomotive with a 4-6-0 wheel arrangement from the Lourenco Marques, Delagoa Bay and East Africa Railway in Mozambique. The locomotive was not classified, but named Portuguese and referred to by name.

==== Narrow gauge ====
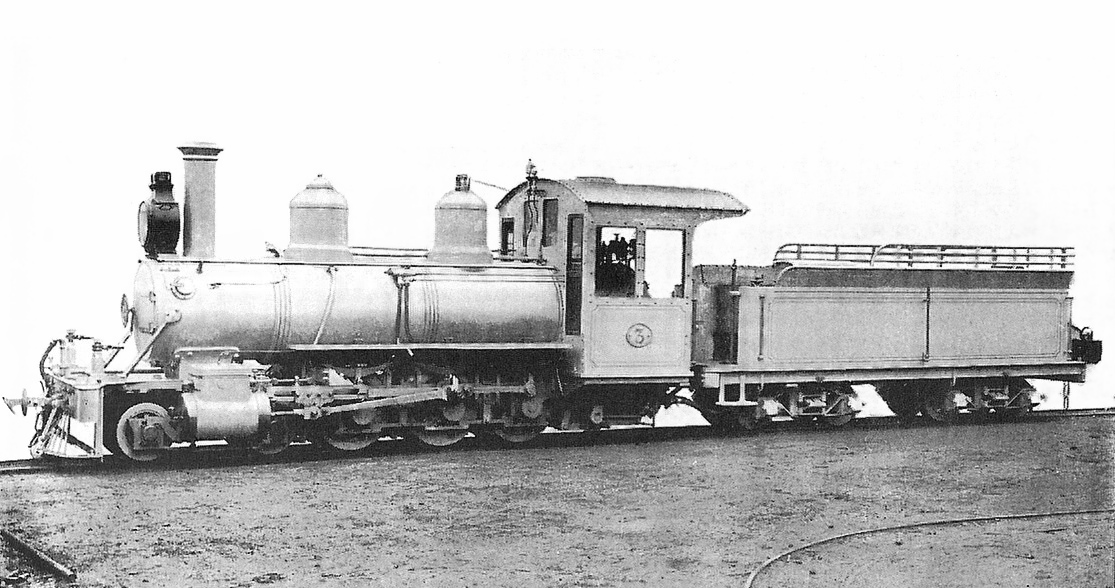
SAR Class NG8

In 1903, the CGR placed six Type B 4-6-0 locomotives with eight-wheeled bogie tenders in service on the Avontuur narrow gauge line in the Langkloof. They were built by W. G. Bagnall and had bar frames, copper fireboxes and Stephenson valve gear. In 1912, they came into SAR stock and, in 1914, a further three locomotives with slightly longer boilers were acquired by the SAR. One of these was also built by Bagnall while the other two were built by Kerr, Stuart and Company. These three were commonly referred to as the Improved B. When a system of grouping narrow gauge locomotives into classes was eventually introduced somewhere between 1928 and 1930, they were to be classified as Class NG8 but had already been withdrawn from service.

During 1915 and 1916, the SAR placed six locomotives in service in the Langkloof, built by Baldwin Locomotive Works. They were very similar to the Bagnall built Type B, except that they were equipped with Walschaerts valve gear. They were later designated Class NG9. Three of them survived in SAR service until April 1951, when they were sold to the Caminhos de Ferro de Moçâmedes (CFM) of Angola. (Also see Angola - Narrow gauge)

=== Sudan ===
During the Second World War, sixteen of the South African Railways (SAR) Classes 6 to 6D were transferred to the Middle East to assist with the war effort during the North African Campaign. The group consisted of seven Class 6, four Class 6A, two Class 6B, one Class 6C and two Class 6D locomotives. They were sold to the Sudan Railways Corporation in 1942. (Also see South Africa - Cape gauge)

=== Sweden ===
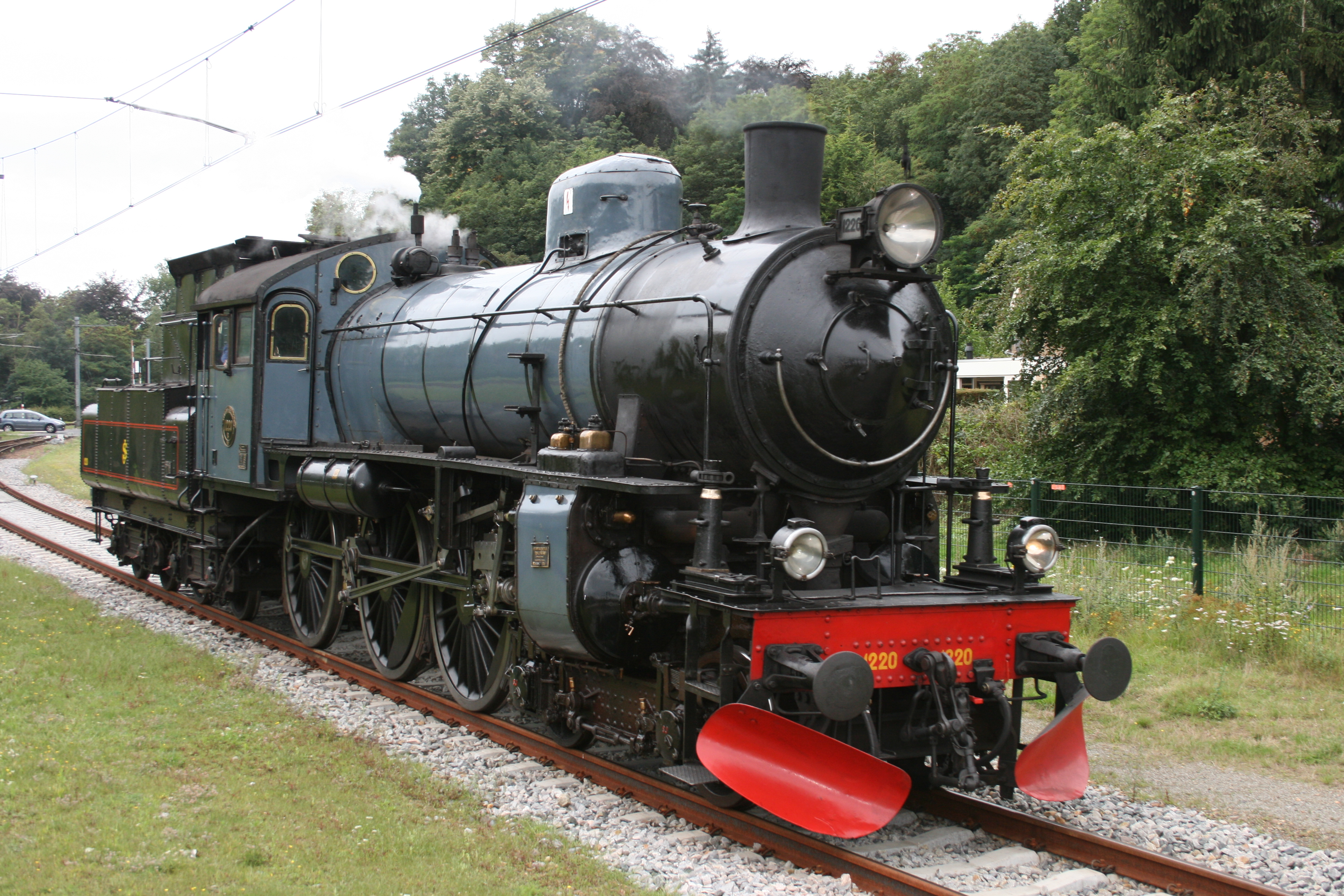
SJ B class locomotive No. 1220 in operation at the ZLSM in the Netherlands.

The Swedish class of B locomotives were of this arrangement they were used for both goods trains and high speed passenger services being built 1909-19 the locomotive was so successful three more locomotives were built in 1943-44 all locomotives were built by NOHAB. A relatively large number of the locomotives are preserved as it was one of the last steam locomotives in the strategic reserve and was kept in mothball storage until the 1990s.

=== Switzerland ===
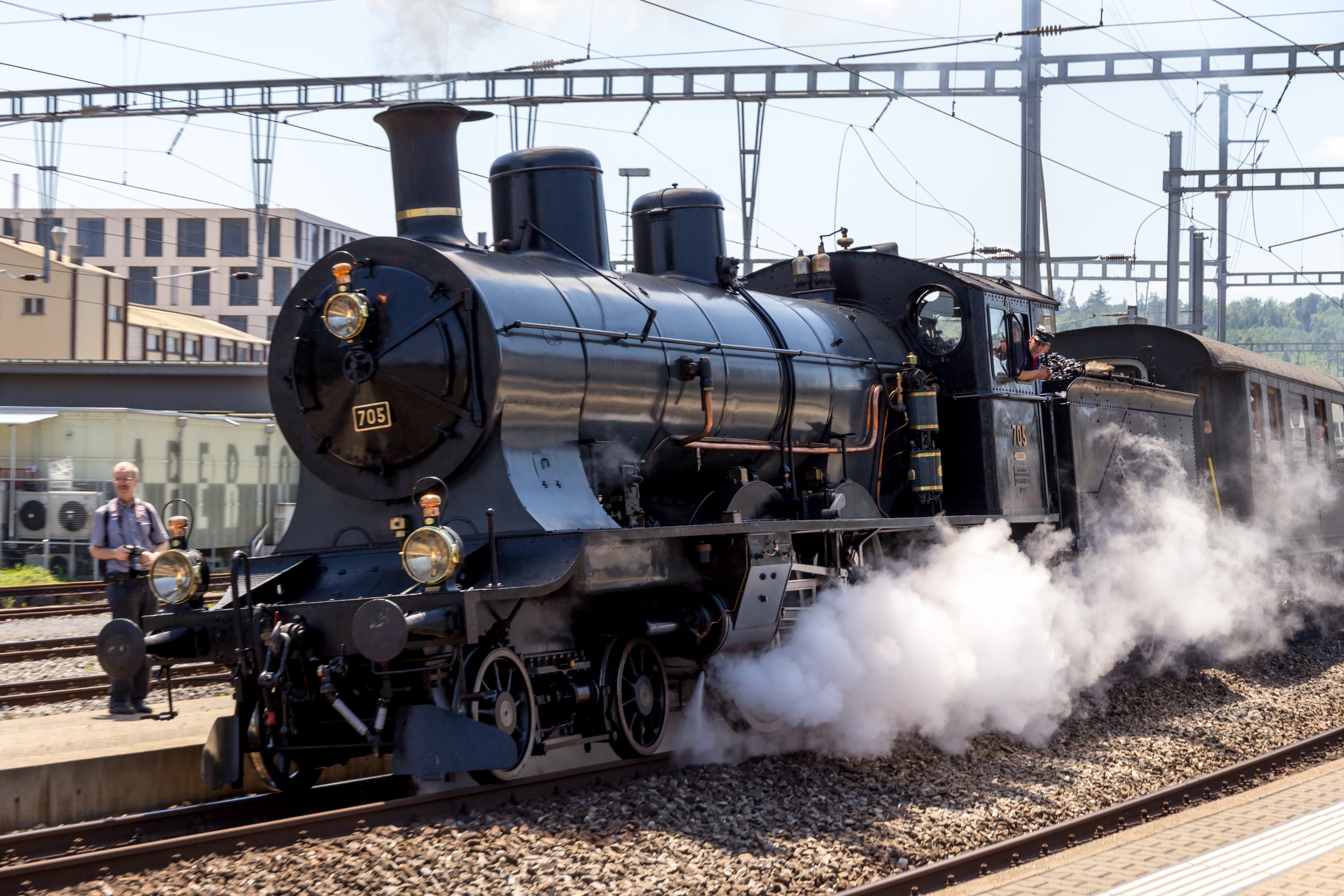
A Swiss Federal Railways Class A 3/5 in Brugg.

The Swiss Class A 3/5 locomotives built by the Swiss Locomotive and Machine Works between 1902 and 1922 for the Jura–Simplon Railway, and the Gotthard Railway was of type 4-6-0.

=== Thailand ===
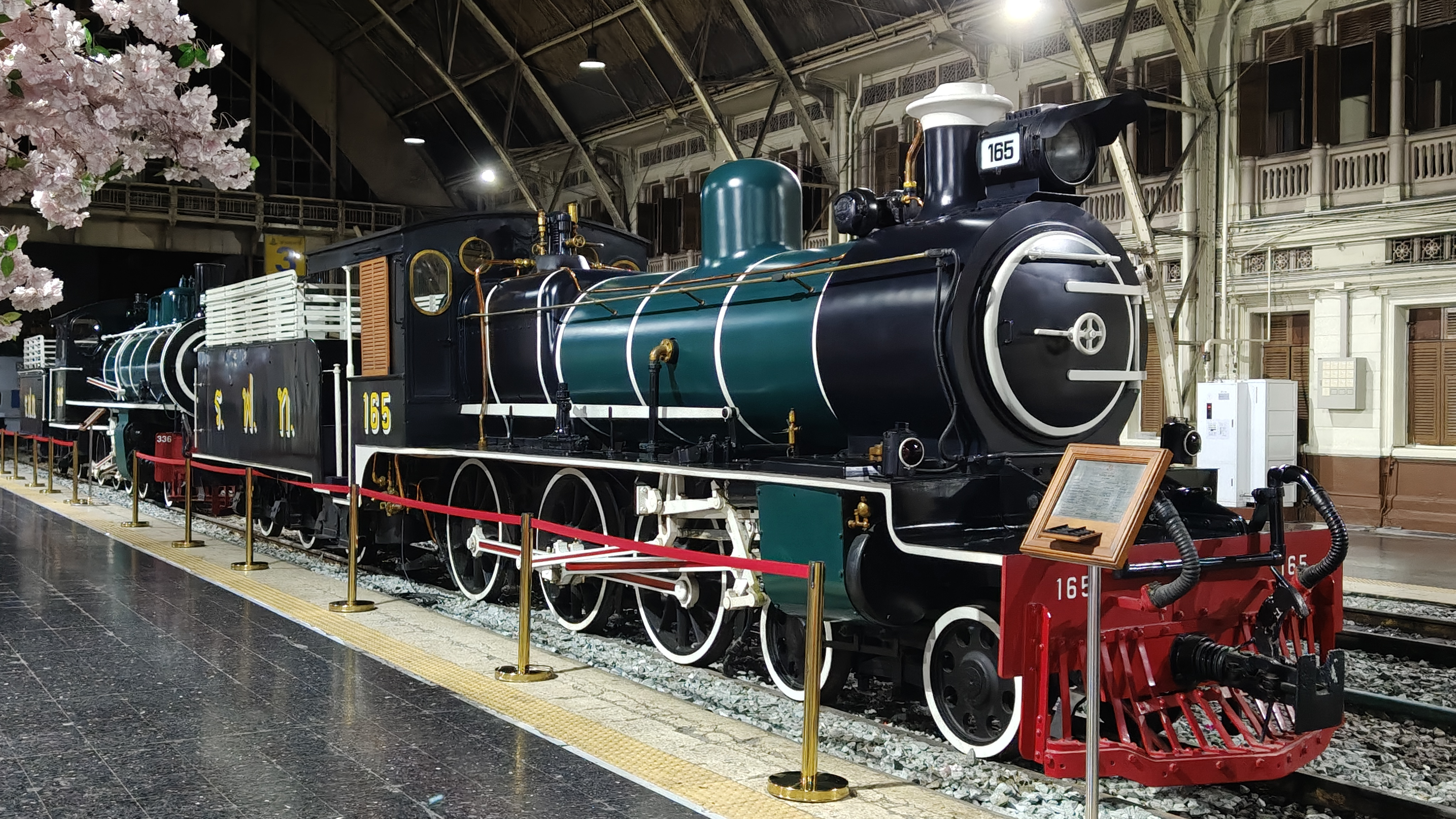
Preserved E class No. 165 at Hua Lamphong Station, December, 2024

The Royal State Railway of Siam/Thailand (RSR(S)), later the State Railway of Thailand (SRT) had three classes of 4-6-0 type locomotives in their fleet:

- The first class of Thai 4-6-0 locomotives was designated as their class E, built by the North British Locomotive Company (NBL) in three batches of 12, 5 and 24 in 1913, 1915 and 1919 respectively. The E class were based on a standardised design outlined by the Engineering Standards Committee (later the British Engineering Standards Association (BESA)) of a mixed-traffic metre-gauge locomotive for service on British Indian railways, as delivered to the Madras and Southern Mahratta Railway (MSMR).
- The second class of Thai 4-6-0 locomotives were 7 4-6-0s of the Nederlands-Indische Spoorweg (NIS) 381-400 number series, later the C52 class locomotives. These were captured by the Japanese occupation forces in the Dutch East Indies during WWII and hauled trains on the Burma Railway. Other locomotives from the same class were sent to Indochina.
- The third class of Thai 4-6-0 locomotives was a single Burma Railways (BR) Ks class locomotive, No. 396, also derived from the aforementioned BESA design (with superheating applied), and also captured by Japanese occupation forces in Burma and taken to Thailand.

Six out of the twelve locomotives from the first batch of Es were given Caprotti valve gear in 1930. Five E class locomotives were donated to Cambodia in the 1970s, then considered surplus by the SRT. The remaining members of the E class were in service with the Thai railways until 1974.

Several E class locomotives are preserved at various locations in Thailand.

One of the Thai C52s was lost either to an accident or to cannibalisation. The remaining members of the class were later purchased from the NIS and taken into SRT stock. No. 751 of the ex-NIS 4-6-0s is preserved at the Army Engineering Museum, Ratchaburi.

The single ex-Burmese Ks was withdrawn and scrapped in 1954 after the Thai railways recovered from the war.

=== United Kingdom ===
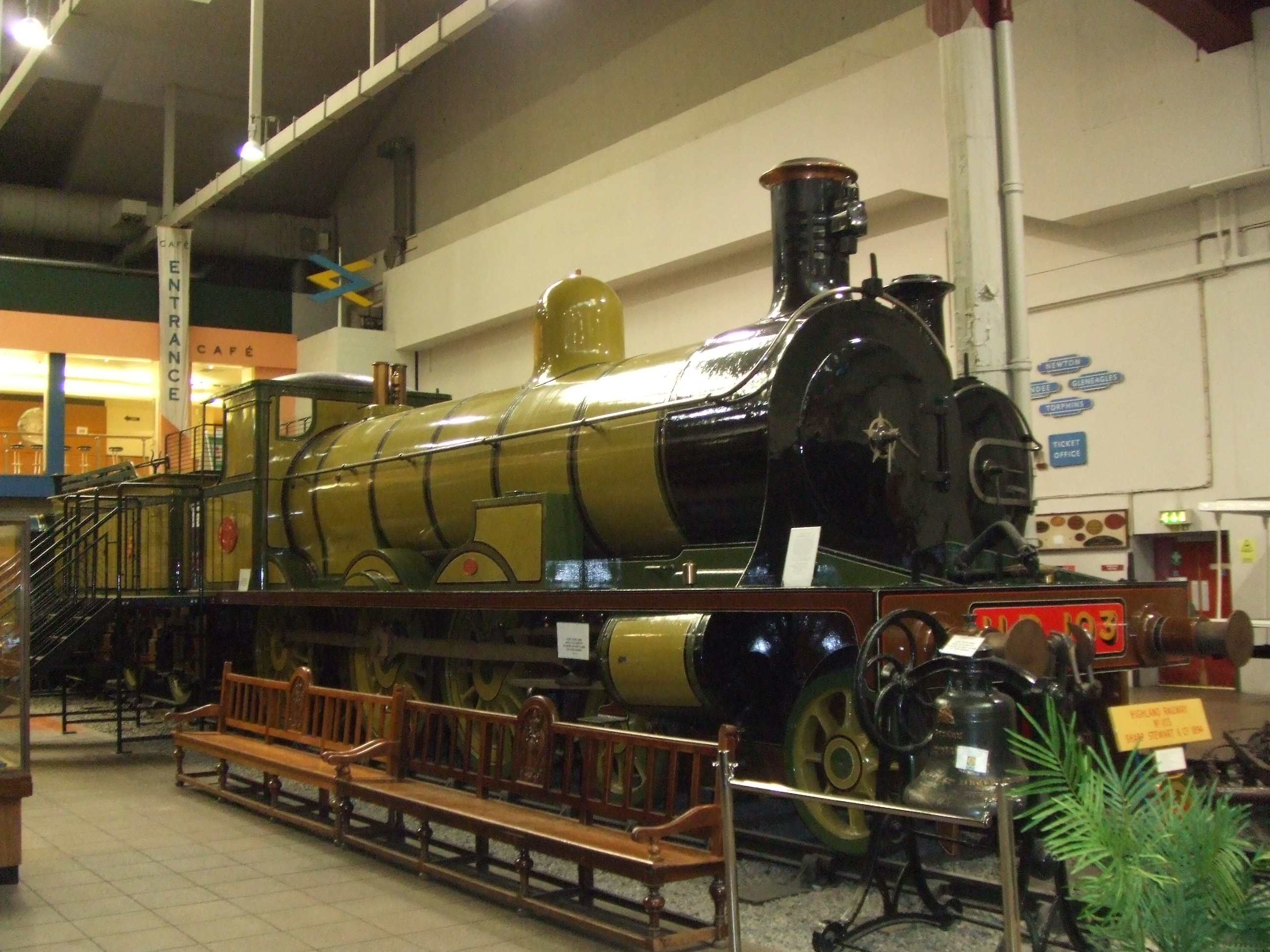
Highland Railway 'Jones Goods' No.103.

The first 4-6-0 locomotive to be introduced in the United Kingdom was the Highland Railway's Jones Goods class of 1894, the first of which (No. 103) survives. Within five years, however, the wheel arrangement was being used primarily on passenger service, since British heavy freight trains were generally too slow to require a locomotive with a four-wheel leading bogie. Between 1906 and 1925, the 4-6-0 became the most common express passenger locomotive type in everyday use in the United Kingdom, as a logical development from the 4-4-0 type that was previously used. The 4-6-0 type continued to be used as mixed traffic locomotive until the end of steam in the United Kingdom in 1968.

==== Pre-grouping era ====
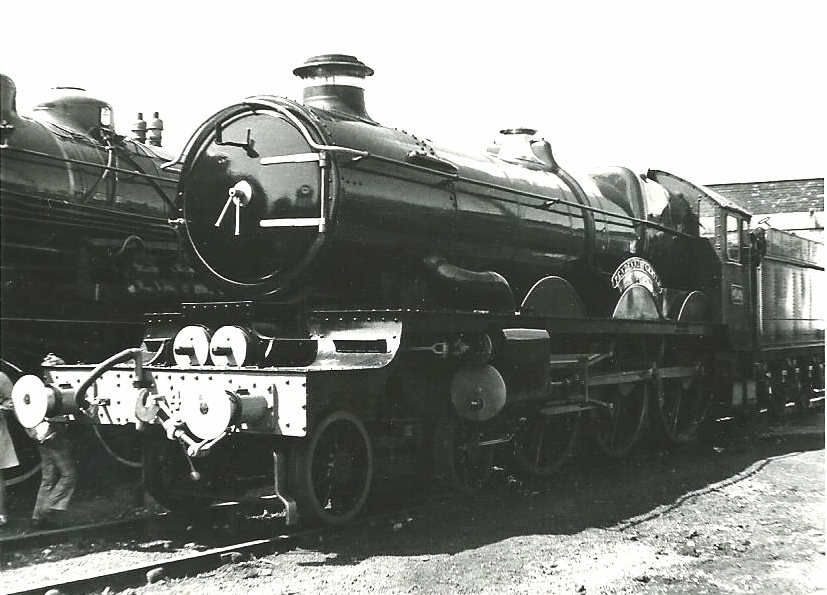
Pendennis Castle GWR 4079

During the pre-grouping era, from 1899 to 1923, Wilson Worsdell of the North Eastern Railway (NER) used the type for his express passenger locomotives, the S and S1 classes of 1899 and 1900 that became the B13 and B14 classes of the London and North Eastern Railway (LNER) in 1923. Soon afterwards, these were followed by the appearance of other designs.

- John G. Robinson of the Great Central Railway (GCR) designed the Class 8 Fish Engines of 1902.
- In 1902 and 1903, George Jackson Churchward produced the 2900 Saint Class, which was the first in a long line of 4-6-0 classes operated by the Great Western Railway (GWR).
- In 1903, Francis Webb of the London and North Western Railway (LNWR) followed with his unsuccessful four-cylinder compound locomotives of the 1400 Bill Bailey class.
- Between 1905 and 1910, altogether 105 locomotives of George Whale's Experiment Class were built for the LNWR.

Two notable 4-6-0 express passenger designs appeared in 1906. One was the Caledonian Railway's Cardean Class which was, at the time, the most powerful locomotive in Britain. The other was Churchward's four-cylinder GWR Star Class, which was developed and enlarged by Charles Collett as the GWR 4073 Castle class in 1923 and later also as the GWR 6000 King class in 1927.

Other significant early express 4-6-0 designs included:

- The LNWR's Prince of Wales Class, with 246 locomotives built between 1911 and 1921.
- The LNWR's Claughton Class, with 130 locomotives built between 1913 and 1924.
- The Class S69 of the Great Eastern Railway (GER), with 81 locomotives produced between 1912 and 1928.

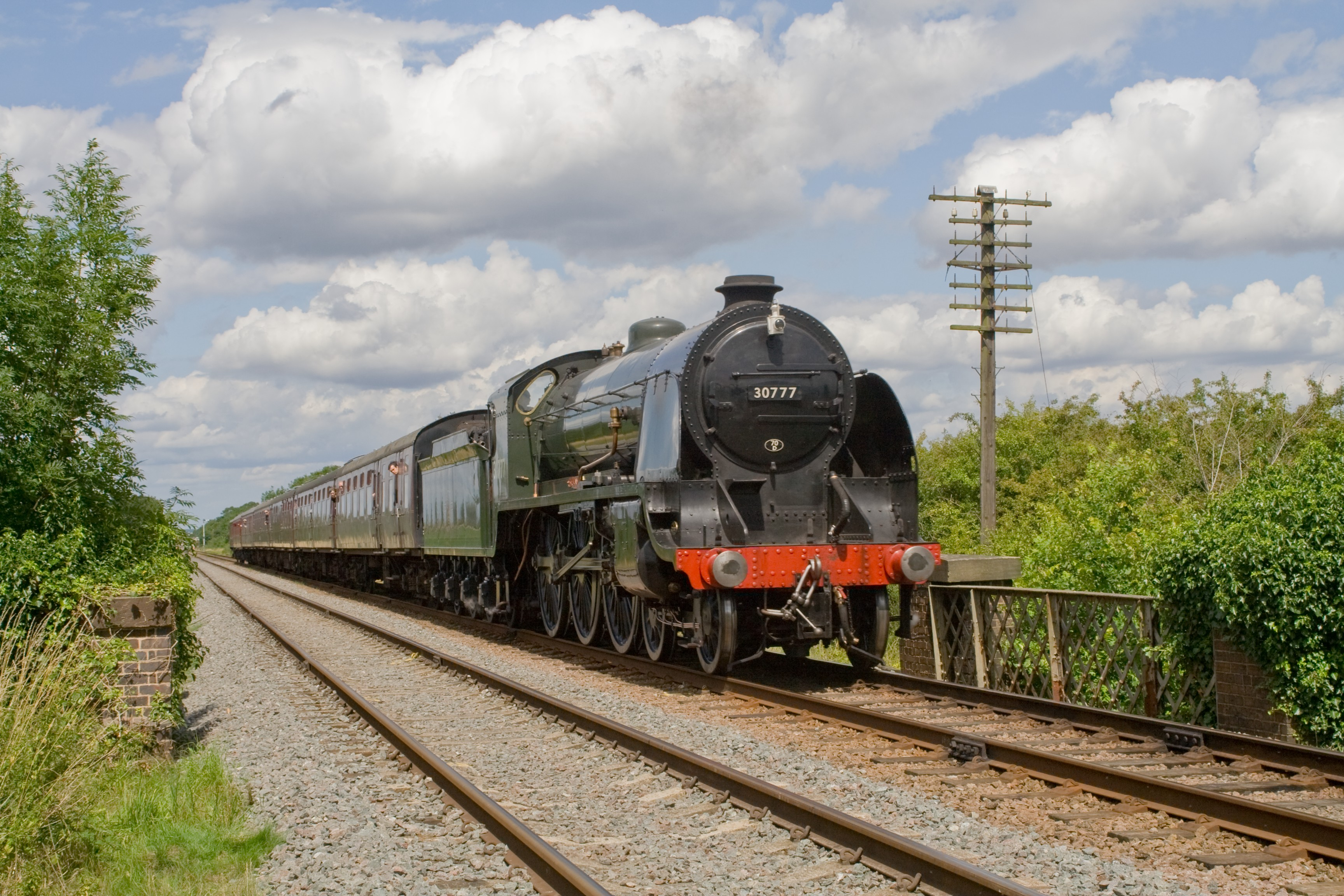
King Arthur class 30777 Sir Lamiel

Robert Urie of the London and South Western Railway (LSWR) introduced three successful classes, the H15 class mixed traffic locomotives, introduced in 1914 and built until 1924, the N15 King Arthur class, with 74 locomotives built between 1919 and 1926, and the S15 class, with 45 locomotives built between 1920 and 1936.

In 1907, Wilson Worsdell of the NER built ten W class 4-6-0T tank locomotives. These were all rebuilt to NER Class W1 4-6-2T Pacific between 1914 and 1917.

==== Post-grouping era ====
During the post-grouping era from 1923 to 1948, the 4-6-0 wheel arrangement was used extensively by all of the Big Four British railway companies, especially by the Great Western Railway (GWR) and the London, Midland and Scottish Railway (LMS), who continued to develop new designs.

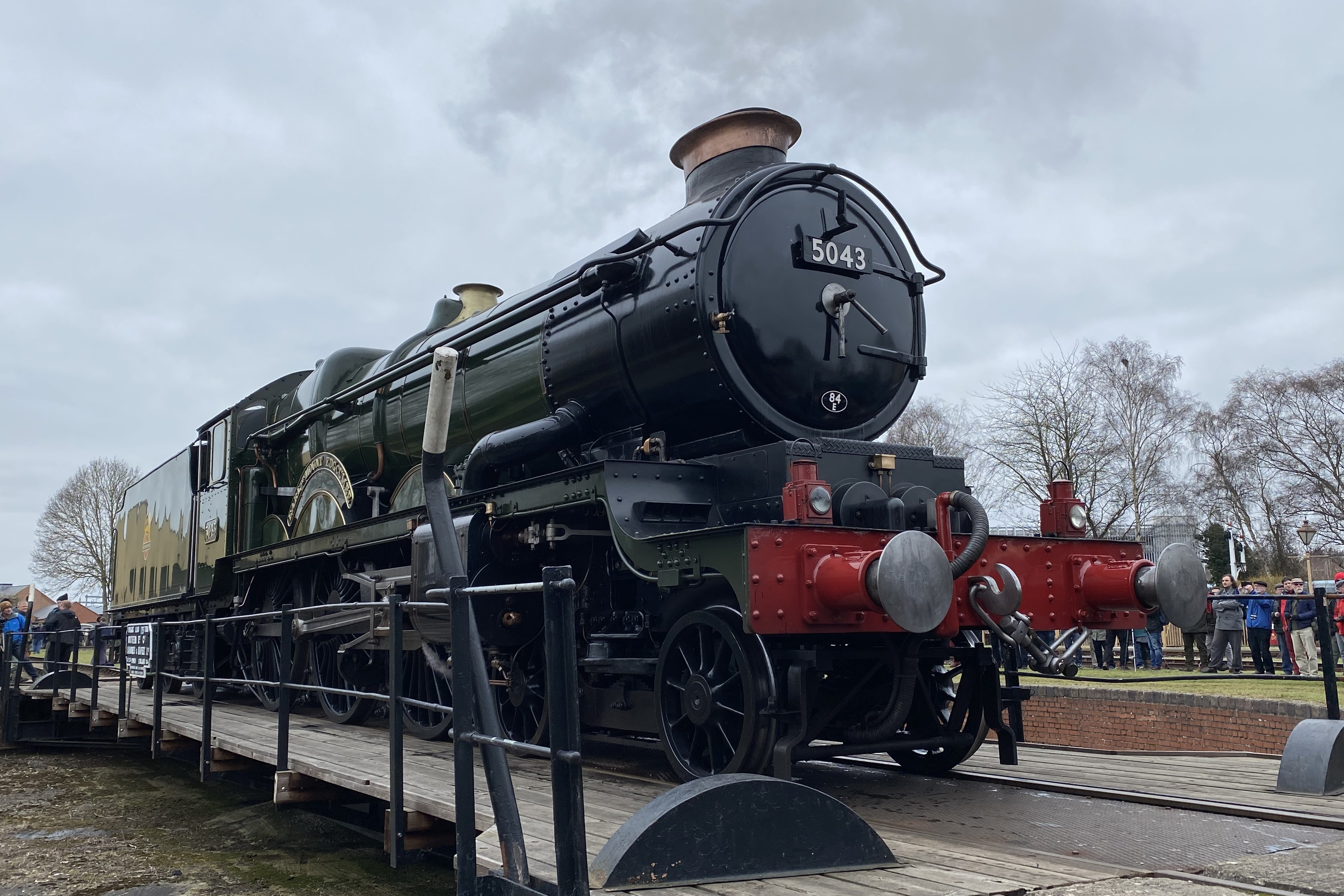
GWR 4073 Class 5043 Earl of Mount Edgcumbe

However, from the early 1930s, demands for more power and improved performance from express passenger locomotives led to the widespread introduction of 4-6-2 Pacific locomotives, where the trailing axle could support a larger firebox. Since the reduced traction of the driving wheels was not a big disadvantage with relatively light passenger trains, the 4-6-0 was displaced from top-rank express services on most of the railways where they had been used, with the exception of the GWR who continued to build both mixed-traffic and express passenger 4-6-0s until nationalisation in 1948. The GWR's 4073 Castle Class eventually consisted of 171 express passenger locomotives, built between 1923 and 1950. The design was enlarged as the GWR's 6000 King Class, with thirty locomotives built between 1927 and 1930.

Several new mixed traffic 4-6-0s were also introduced:

- The Southern Railway improved the LSWR's King Arthur class and introduced the Lord Nelson class, which was briefly the most powerful class in Britain. Sixteen locomotives were built between 1926 and 1929.
- The LMS introduced the 7P Royal Scot class, with 71 locomotives built between 1927 and 1930, and the 6P Patriot class, with 52 locomotives built between 1930 and 1934. All of the Royal Scots and 18 of the Patriots were subsequently rebuilt in line with Stanier's practice and were very successful in this form.
- The largest and most successful British 4-6-0 class was the LMS Class 5 Black Five, designed by William Stanier and consisting of 842 locomotives, built between 1934 and 1951. Stanier also designed the LMS 6P Jubilee class, with 191 locomotives built between 1934 and 1936.

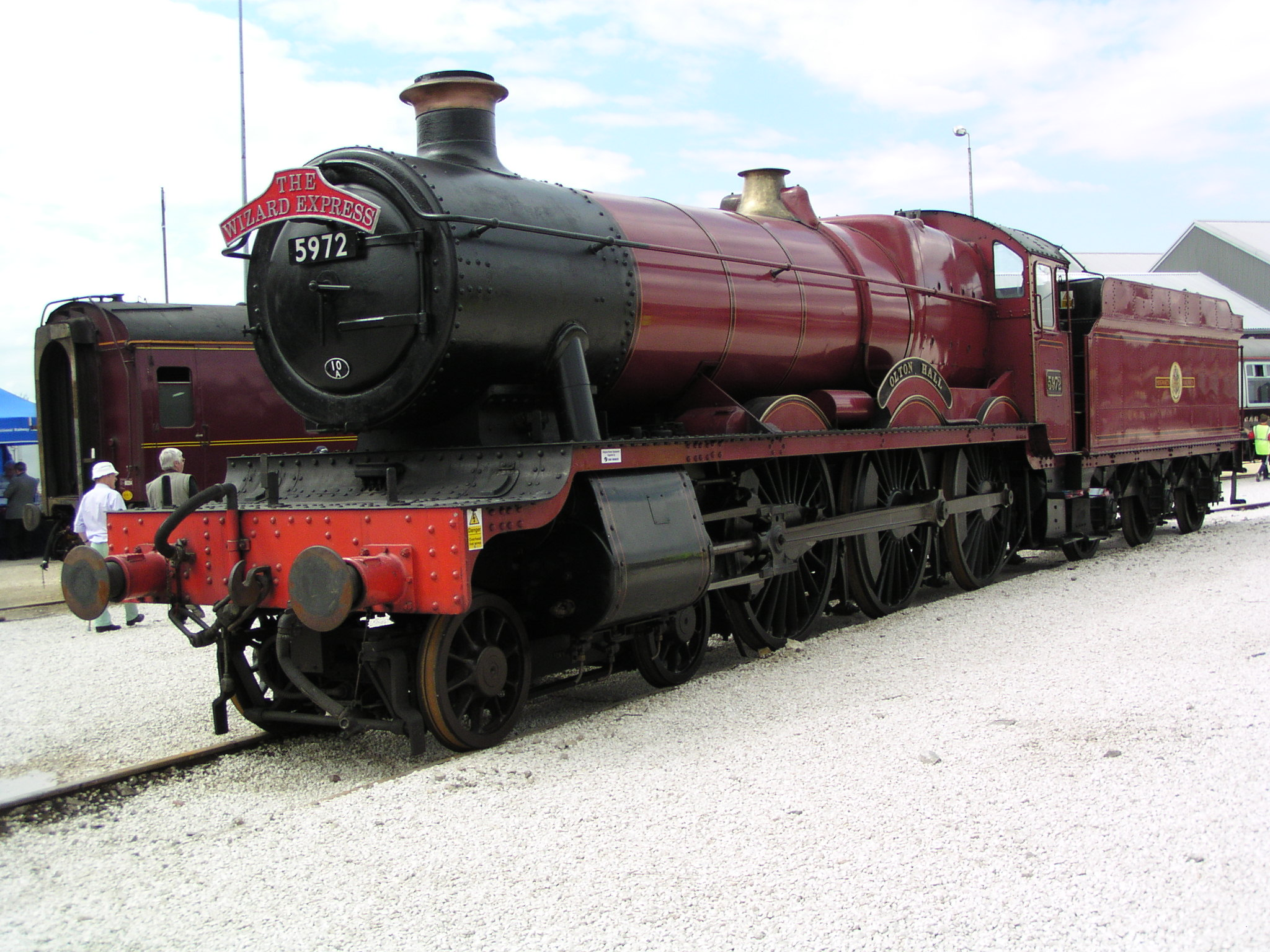
GWR Hall Class Olton Hall hauled the Hogwarts Express in the Harry Potter films

Charles Collett of the GWR developed Churchward's 1902 Saint class design into three further classes:

- The GWR 4900 Hall class, with 259 locomotives built between 1928 and 1943.
- The GWR 6800 Grange class, with eighty locomotives built between 1936 and 1939.
- The GWR 7800 Manor class, with thirty locomotives built between 1938 and 1950.

Frederick Hawksworth later developed the Saint class design further, first with his GWR 6959 Modified Hall Class, with 71 locomotives built between 1944 and 1950, and then with his GWR 1000 County Class, with thirty locomotives built between 1945 and 1947.

The LNER inherited large numbers of 4-6-0 locomotives from its constituent companies, many of which were subsequently rebuilt, so that the company ultimately had sixty different classes and sub-classes with this wheel arrangement. In addition, the company also introduced two new 4-6-0 classes.

- The B17 class, designed by Nigel Gresley, of which 73 were built between 1928 and 1937.
- The B1 class, designed by Edward Thompson, of which 410 locomotives were built between 1942 and 1952.

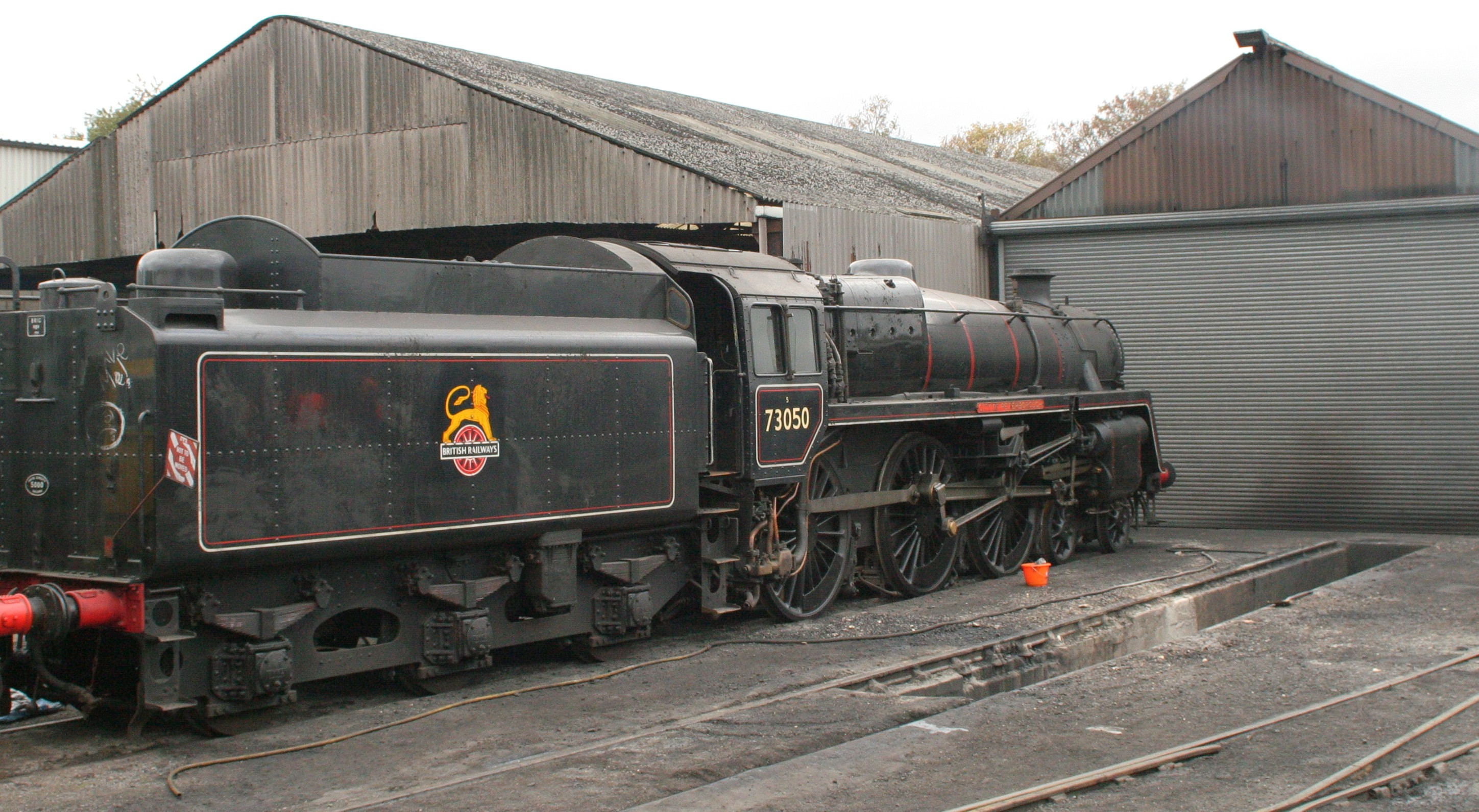
BR standard class 5

==== British Railways era ====
Following the formation of British Railways in 1948, two further 4-6-0 classes were introduced, both in 1951.

- The BR Standard Class 5 was based on Stanier's successful LMS Black Five of 1934. Altogether 172 locomotives were built by 1957.
- A lighter and less powerful design was the BR Standard Class 4. Eighty of these were built by 1957.

=== United States ===
The first 4-6-0 locomotive built in the United States was the Chesapeake, built by Norris Locomotive Works for the Philadelphia and Reading railroad in March 1847. There are still conflicting opinions as to who the original designer of this type was. Many authorities attribute the design to Septimus Norris of Norris Locomotive Works, but in an 1885 paper, George E. Sellers attributes the design to John Brandt who worked for the Erie Railroad between 1842 and 1851.

- According to Sellers, the Erie's own management didn't feel it in their best interests to pursue construction, so Brandt approached Baldwin Locomotive Works and Norris with the design. Baldwin was similarly uninterested, but Norris liked the idea. James Millholland of the Reading also saw the 4-6-0 design and ordered one from Norris for the Reading. However, Sellers may have misinterpreted some of the information since Millholland did not work for the Reading until 1848, a year after the locomotive was built. Furthermore, Sellers refers to the first 4-6-0 to be constructed as the Susquehanna, which was the Erie railroad's first 4-6-0, not the Reading's.
- The attribution to Septimus Norris stems from a patent, allegedly filed in 1846, that many sources cite for this locomotive type. However, such a patent has not yet been found in searches at the United States Patent and Trademark Office (USPTO). Septimus Norris did file a patent in 1854 for running gears, and the patent application showed a 4-6-0 wheel arrangement in the drawing. Norris' wording in the 1854 patent was vague with regard to the 4-6-0 wheel arrangement and the filing did not specifically claim invention of the 4-6-0 configuration.

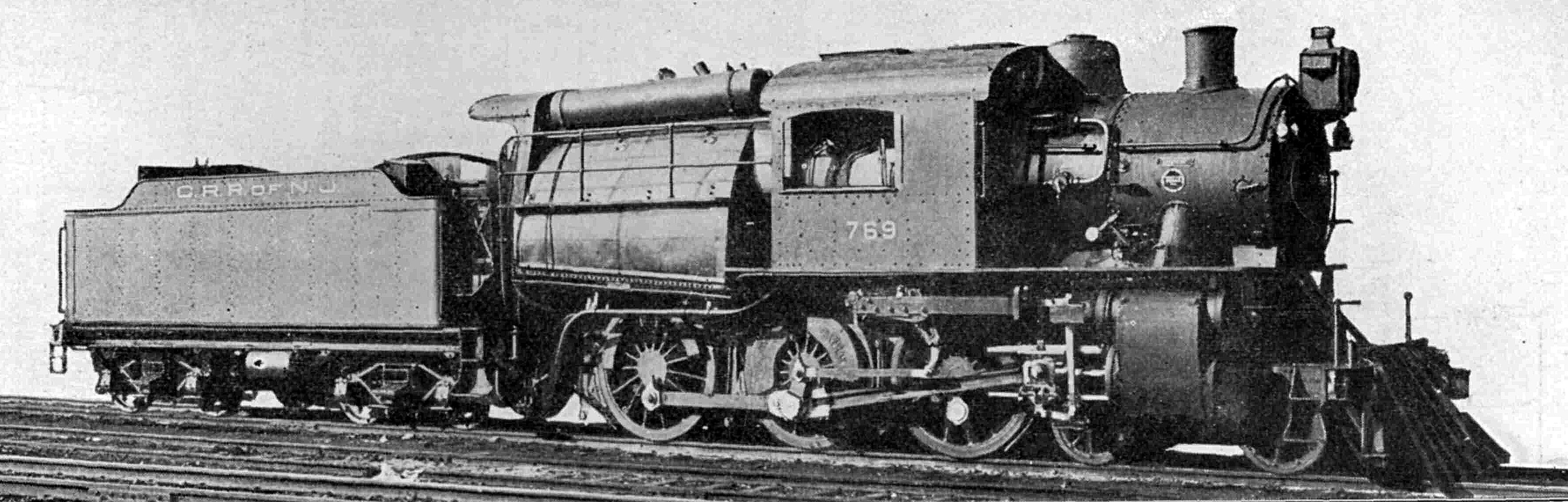
A 4-6-0 Camelback locomotive

A few days after William Norris completed the Chesapeake, Hinkley Locomotive Works completed their first 4-6-0 locomotive, the New Hampshire, for the Boston and Maine Railroad. The first 4-6-0 from Rogers Locomotive and Machine Works was the already-mentioned Susquehanna for the Erie Railroad. Baldwin's first 4-6-0 locomotive did not appear until 1852.

Through the 1860s and into the 1870s, demand for locomotives of the 4-6-0 wheel arrangement grew as more railroad executives switched from purchasing a single, general-purpose type of locomotive such as the 4-4-0 American at that time, to purchasing locomotives designed for a specific purpose. Both the Pennsylvania Railroad (PRR) and the Baltimore and Ohio Railroad (B&O) were early adopters of the 4-6-0, using them for fast freight as well as heavy passenger trains.

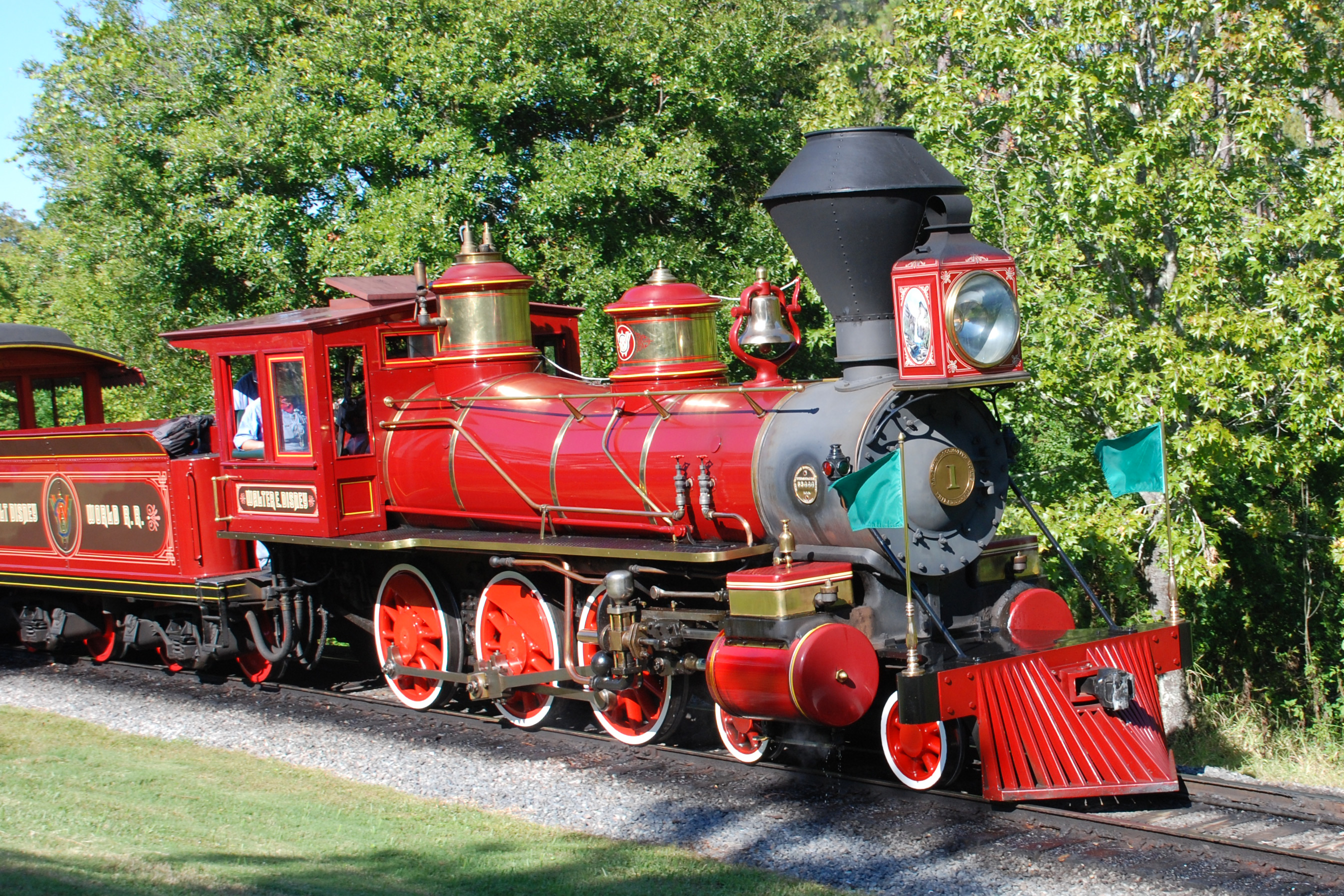
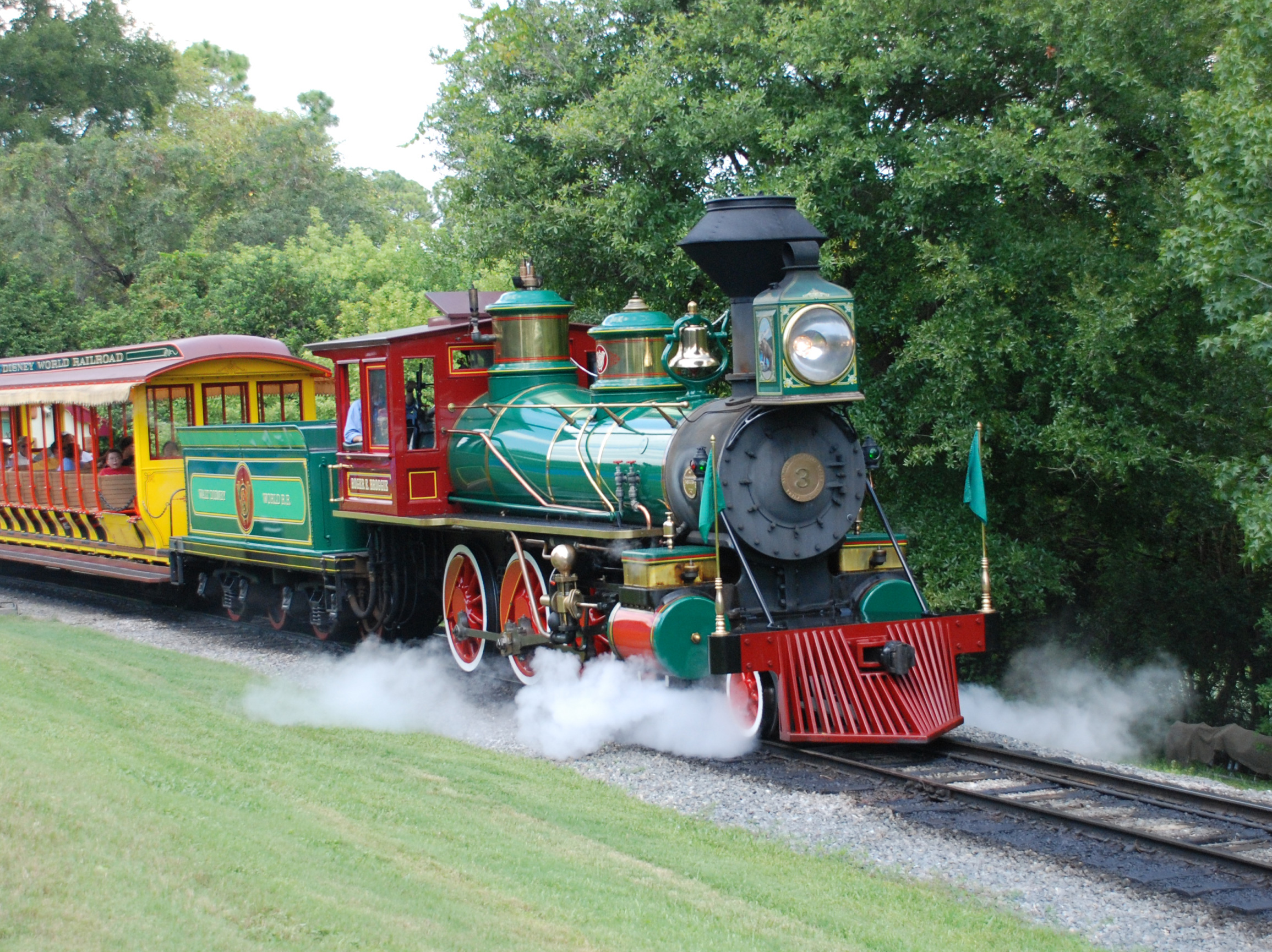
WDWRR Nos. 1 Walter E. Disney and 3 Roger E. Broggie, twin 4-6-0 locomotives built in 1925.

There were also two 3 ft narrow gauge 4-6-0 steam locomotives, No. 72 (No. 274) and No. 73 (No. 275), built by the Baldwin Locomotive Works in May 1925 for the United Railways of Yucatán in Mexico, where they operated until being retired in the 1960s and were eventually purchased by Disney imagineers Roger E. Broggie and Earl Vilmer for $8,000 each to operate on the Walt Disney World Railroad circling the Magic Kingdom in Bay Lake, Florida. No. 274 became No. 1 Walter E. Disney and No. 275 became No. 3 Roger E. Broggie. Both locomotives have since been overhauled at the Strasburg Rail Road. No. 1 was overhauled between 2016 and 2020 and returned to service upon the reopening of the WDWRR on December 23, 2022, while No. 3 was overhauled between 2019 and 2023 and returned to service on February 21, 2024.

Sierra No. 3 is a 4-6-0 built 1891 by Rogers, which after many years of service on the Prescott and Arizona Central and the Sierra Railway, found new life beginning in 1920 on screen. Sierra No. 3 has appeared in more motion pictures, documentaries and television shows than any other locomotive, and has a career ranging from The Virginian (1929) to High Noon (1952) to Back to the Future Part III (1990).

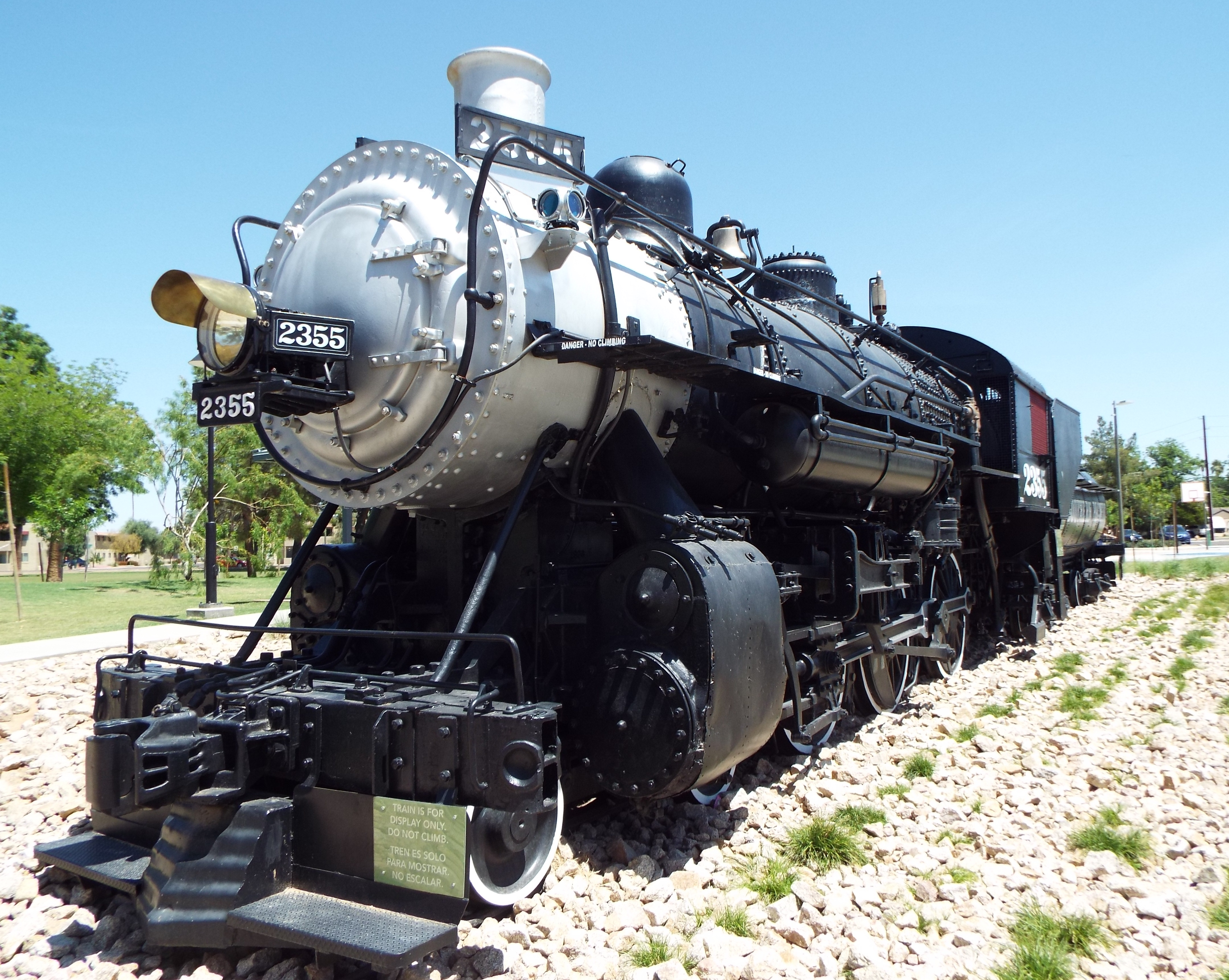
Southern Pacific Railroad (SP) 2355 built in 1912

A notable American ten-wheeler is the Illinois Central Railroad's No. 382, the locomotive driven by Casey Jones in a train wreck Vaughan, Mississippi, on April 30, 1900, that killed him instantly. But after an eventful career with 6 accidents, she was scrapped in July 1935 at the age of 37, the same age of her driver Casey Jones when he died. A Clinchfield Railroad locomotive of the 4-6-0 type No. 99 replaced her in 1956 and is on display at the Casey Jones museum in Jackson, Tennessee.

As far as is known, the heaviest 4-6-0 ever built was Southern Pacific No. 2371. According to R&LHS Bulletin No. 94, its engine weight was 242,500 pounds (110.0 t). The heaviest class of 4-6-0's ever put into series production was the Pennsylvania Railroad class G5 with 90 examples completed in the mid-1920s, which were some 5,500 pounds (2.5 t) lighter.

One of the B&O's 4-6-0s, built in 1869, is preserved at the National Museum of Railroad History & Innovation in Baltimore. Another is at the National Museum of Transportation in St. Louis. A third, The Great Northern Railway's GN 1355, built in 1909 as a 4-6-0 but rebuilt to a 4-6-2 Pacific in 1924, is in Sioux City, Iowa.

Nevada Northern Railway's No. 40 a 1910 built 4-6-0 has been preserved on the railroad and is known by the nickname "The Ghost Train of Ely". Due to its long history of operating in the state, in 2009 No. 40 was recognized as the official Nevada State Steam Locomotive.

The only surviving locomotive of the 3 ft (914 mm) narrow gauge East Tennessee and Western North Carolina Railroad (ET&WNC) is No. 12, a coal-fired 4-6-0 built in 1917 by the Baldwin Locomotive Works. It was originally used to haul passengers and freight over the ET&WNC's 66-mile (106-kilometre) line running from Johnson City over the Appalachian Mountains to Boone, North Carolina, from 1918 to 1940. Since 1957, it has been in operation at the Tweetsie Railroad theme park in Blowing Rock, North Carolina.
