= Cape Government Railways 4th Class locomotives =

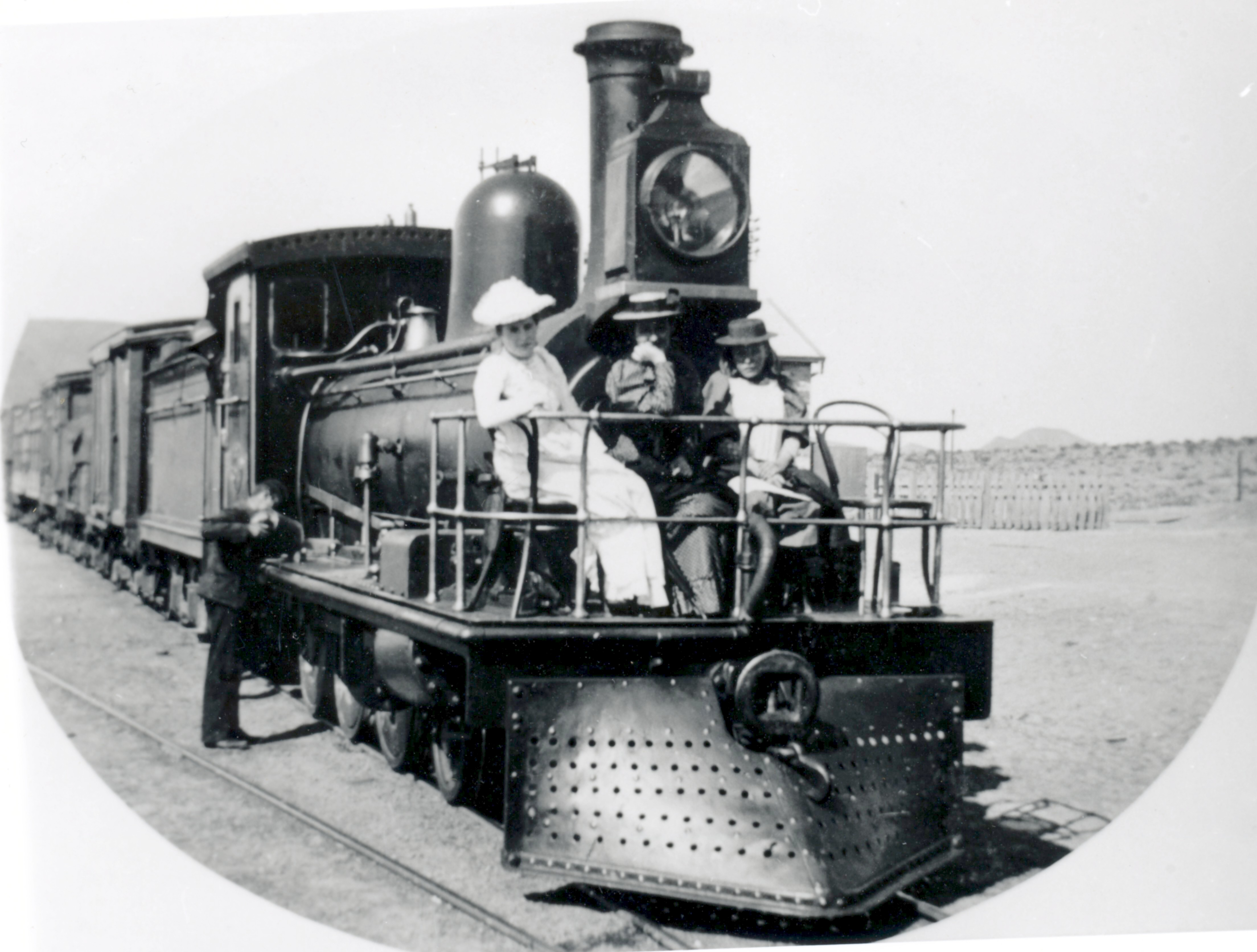
CGR 4th Class 4-6-0TT Converted Joy of 1882

The Cape Government Railways 4th Class locomotives include five locomotive types, all designated 4th Class irrespective of differences in wheel arrangement or configuration.

When the Union of South Africa was established on 31 May 1910, the three Colonial government railways (Cape Government Railways, Natal Government Railways and Central South African Railways) were united under a single administration to control and administer the railways, ports and harbours of the Union. Those of these locomotives which still survived, were considered obsolete and designated Class 04 on the new South African Railways.

4-4-2 wheel arrangement

- CGR 4th Class 4-4-2 (Tender)

4-6-0 wheel arrangement

- CGR 4th Class 4-6-0TT 1880 (Tank and optional tender)
- CGR 4th Class 4-6-0TT 1882 (Tank-and-tender, Stephenson valve gear)
- CGR 4th Class 4-6-0TT 1882 Joy (Tank-and-tender, Joy valve gear)
- CGR 4th Class 4-6-0TT 1884 (Tank-and-tender, experimental)
