= CGR 3rd Class 4-4-0 1884 =

Class of 2 South African 4-4-0 locomotives

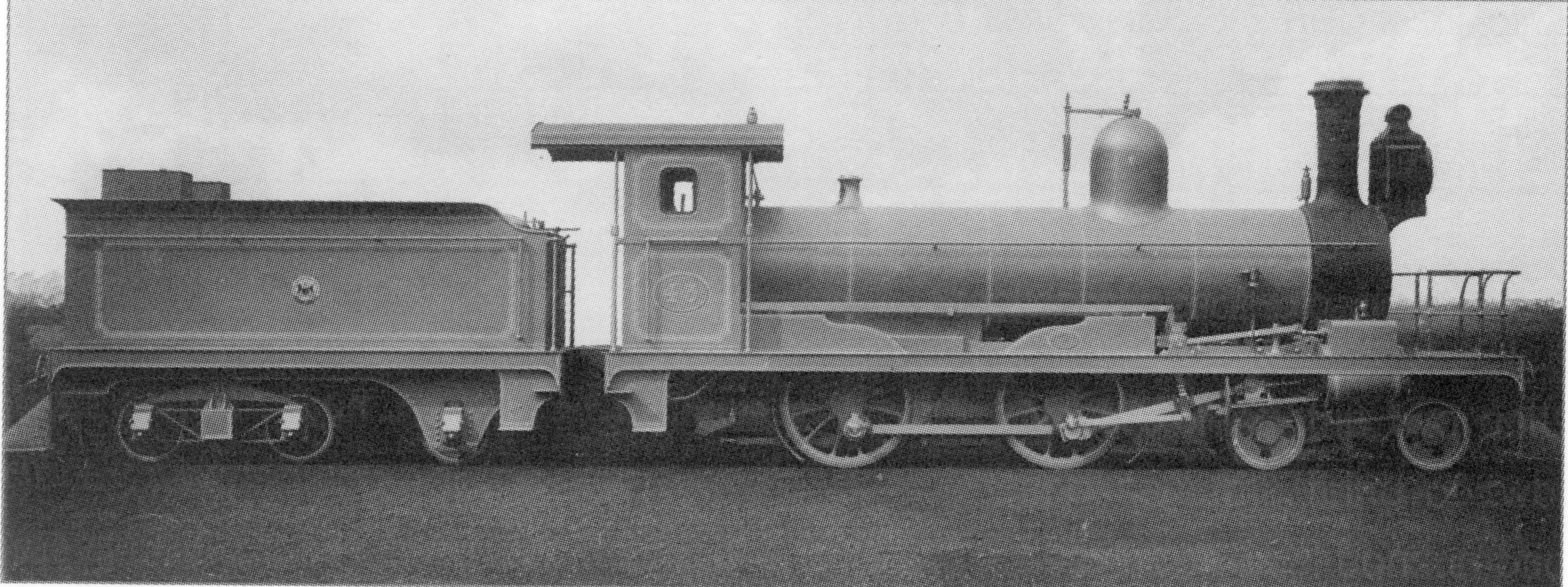
- Neilson works picture, c. 1884
Type and origin
- Power type: Steam
- Designer: Cape Government Railways (J.D. Tilney)
- Builder: Neilson and Company
- Serial number: 3080-3081
- Build date: 1883
- Total produced: 2
Specifications
- Configuration
  - Whyte: 4-4-0 (American)
  - UIC: 2'Bn2
- Driver: 1st coupled axle
- Gauge: 3 ft 6 in (1,067 mm) Cape gauge
- Leading dia.: 27 1/2 in (698 mm)
- Coupled dia.: 48 3/4 in (1,238 mm)
- Tender wheels: 27 1/2 in (698 mm)
- Wheelbase: 38 ft 9 in (11,811 mm)
  - Engine: 17 ft 9 in (5,410 mm)
  - Leading: 5 ft (1,524 mm)
  - Coupled: 6 ft 6 in (1,981 mm)
  - Tender: 9 ft 3 in (2,819 mm)
  - Tender bogie: 4 ft 5 1/2 in (1,359 mm)
- Length
  - Over couplers: 46 ft 2 1/2 in (14,084 mm)
- Height: 12 ft (3,658 mm)
- Tender weight: 20 LT 2 cwt 1 qtr (20,440 kg)
- Tender type: 3-axle (1 leading, 1 bogie)
- Fuel type: Coal
- Fuel capacity: 5 LT (5.1 t)
- Water cap.: 1,700 imp gal (7,730 L)
- Firebox
  - Type: Round-top
  - Grate area: 18.25 sq ft (1.695 m^{2})
- Boiler
  - Pitch: 6 ft (1,829 mm)
  - Tube plates: 10 ft 4 1/2 in (3,162 mm)
  - Small tubes: 143: 1 3/4 in (44 mm)
- Boiler pressure: 130 psi (896 kPa)
- Safety valve: Salter
- Heating surface
  - Firebox: 83.23 sq ft (7.732 m^{2})
  - Tubes: 679.6 sq ft (63.14 m^{2})
  - Total surface: 762.83 sq ft (70.869 m^{2})
- Cylinders: Two
- Cylinder size: 15 in (381 mm) bore 20 in (508 mm) stroke
- Valve gear: Joy
- Couplers: Johnston link-and-pin
Performance figures
- Tractive effort: 9,000 lbf (40 kN) @ 75%
Career
- Operators: Cape Government Railways
- Class: CGR 3rd Class
- Number in class: 2
- Numbers: E53-E54
- Delivered: 1884
- First run: 1884

The Cape Government Railways 3rd Class 4-4-0 of 1884 was a South African steam locomotive from the pre-Union era in the Cape of Good Hope.

In 1884, the Cape Government Railways placed two experimental 3rd Class tender locomotives with a 4-4-0 American type wheel arrangement in service. They were designed at the Salt River shops in Cape Town to be able to use the low-grade local coal with its high content of incombustible matter.

== Stormberg coalfields ==
In 1883, the extension of the Cape Government Railways (CGR) Eastern System's line from Queenstown reached Sterkstroom and passed through the Stormberg coalfields, where the Molteno and Cyphergat mines were operating.

While the Colonial coal was much cheaper than imported Welsh coal, it had a non-combustible content of as high as 29%. This led to difficulties when it was used in locomotives, since it frequently caused train delays as a result of unscheduled stops to allow the stoker to clear the grate of clinker and ash.

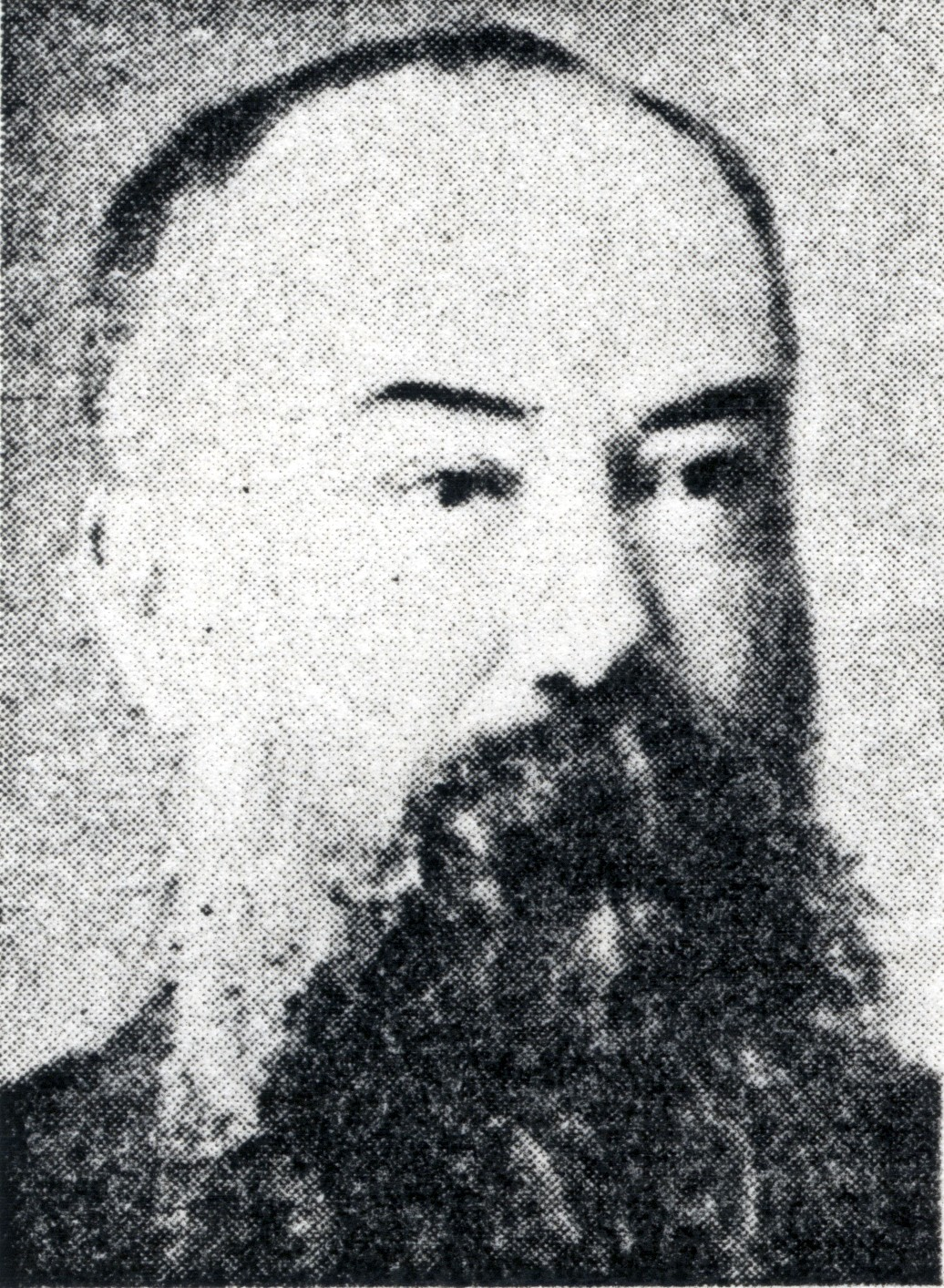
J.D. Tilney

In attempts to overcome the clinker problem, John D. Tilney, the Eastern System's Locomotive Superintendent, carried out many experiments on some of the [[CGR 4th Class 4-6-0TT 1880|4th Class 4-6-0TT]] locomotives which had entered service on the Eastern System in 1880. One of these involved modifying the boilers and frames to accommodate oscillating firebars and larger fireboxes. He also modified approximately thirty locomotives by installing extended fireboxes with wire netting spark arresters and steam blowers and can be considered one of the foremost pioneers of these devices.

Tilney's initiatives did not pass unnoticed. In 1881, the General Manager appointed Mr. Hawthorne R. Thornton as Chief Locomotive Superintendent for the whole of the Cape of Good Hope, in response to the "growing tendency on the part of the several Locomotive Superintendents to bring in modifications of designs in essential parts of the engines and rolling stock".

== Locomotive design ==
With three exceptions, the CGR's 4th Class of 1880 and its Stephenson and Joy valve gear versions of 1882 which had been designed by Western System Locomotive Superintendent Michael Stephens, detailed locomotive designing had hitherto been done by the manufacturers, working on no more than the CGR locomotive department's description of their main requirements. It gradually became apparent, however, that accepted European practices in locomotive design were not suited to South African conditions, since it was found that boilers had difficulty to maintain steam pressure when using anything but the best imported Welsh coal, firebox water spaces were too limited and the tubes were frequently pitched too close. Beginning with the pioneering work done by Tilney, locomotive mechanical engineers of the CGR began to exert greater influence on locomotive designs.

== Manufacturer ==
Based on the results of Tilney's experiments, complete sets of drawings for an experimental 4-4-0 American type tender passenger locomotive and an experimental 4-6-0 Tenwheeler type tank-and-tender goods locomotive were prepared at the CGR's Salt River shops in 1882 and submitted to Neilson and Company, for the construction of two 4-4-0 and four 4-6-0 locomotives. The design of the two types was also an early attempt at standardisation, since their boilers and tenders and many other parts were made interchangeable.

== Characteristics ==
The locomotives were delivered with Joy valve gear. The three-axle tender was unusual, since the leading axle was mounted in a rigid frame while the other two were mounted in a bogie. This was the first time that a bogie was used under a tender in South Africa, but also the only time that this tender wheel arrangement was used on the CGR. This peculiar tender wheel arrangement appeared in South Africa on only one other occasion, eighteen years later on the Baldwin-built Zululand Railway Company 2-6-0 construction locomotive in Natal.

The firebox was specially designed to Tilney's specifications to cope with the high percentage of clinker and ash content of Colonial coal from the Stormberg Range. A large drop-grate which occupied approximately half of the firebox area, with specially designed sawtooth-shaped firebars, was arranged at the front end of the firebox. The firebars could be vibrated by a hand-operated lever in the cab, while the drop grate was controlled by two chains, fitted at each end and also manipulated from the cab.

== Service ==
The 4-4-0 locomotives entered service in 1884 and were designated 3rd Class, numbered E53 and E54 for the Eastern System. Engine no. E54 was delivered to the Eastern system, where Tilney carried out extensive tests using the Stormberg coal. Engine no. E53 was initially delivered to the Western System, for evaluation and testing by Chief Locomotive Superintendent Thornton who, in turn, experimented with coal from Viljoensdrif.

The locomotives gave good results during testing and in service. It was reported at year-end in 1884 that the use of the low-grade coal led to a saving of 1¾d. per engine-mile. They were, however, difficult to fire due to their very long and narrow grates, and it was admitted in the report that dealing with the large drop-grate and the increased amount of clinker and ash placed greater physical strain on the stokers.

No more locomotives of this experimental design were ordered when better quality coal began to become available from the coalfields in Natal, more suitable for use in the standard locomotives.

Both locomotives were renumbered by 1886, when the system number prefixes were done away with and the Eastern System's locomotives were renumbered into the 600 number range. Engine no. E53 became no. 645 and engine no. E54 became no. 646. Neither entered South African Railways service, since both were withdrawn from CGR service between 1900 and 1910.

== Illustration ==
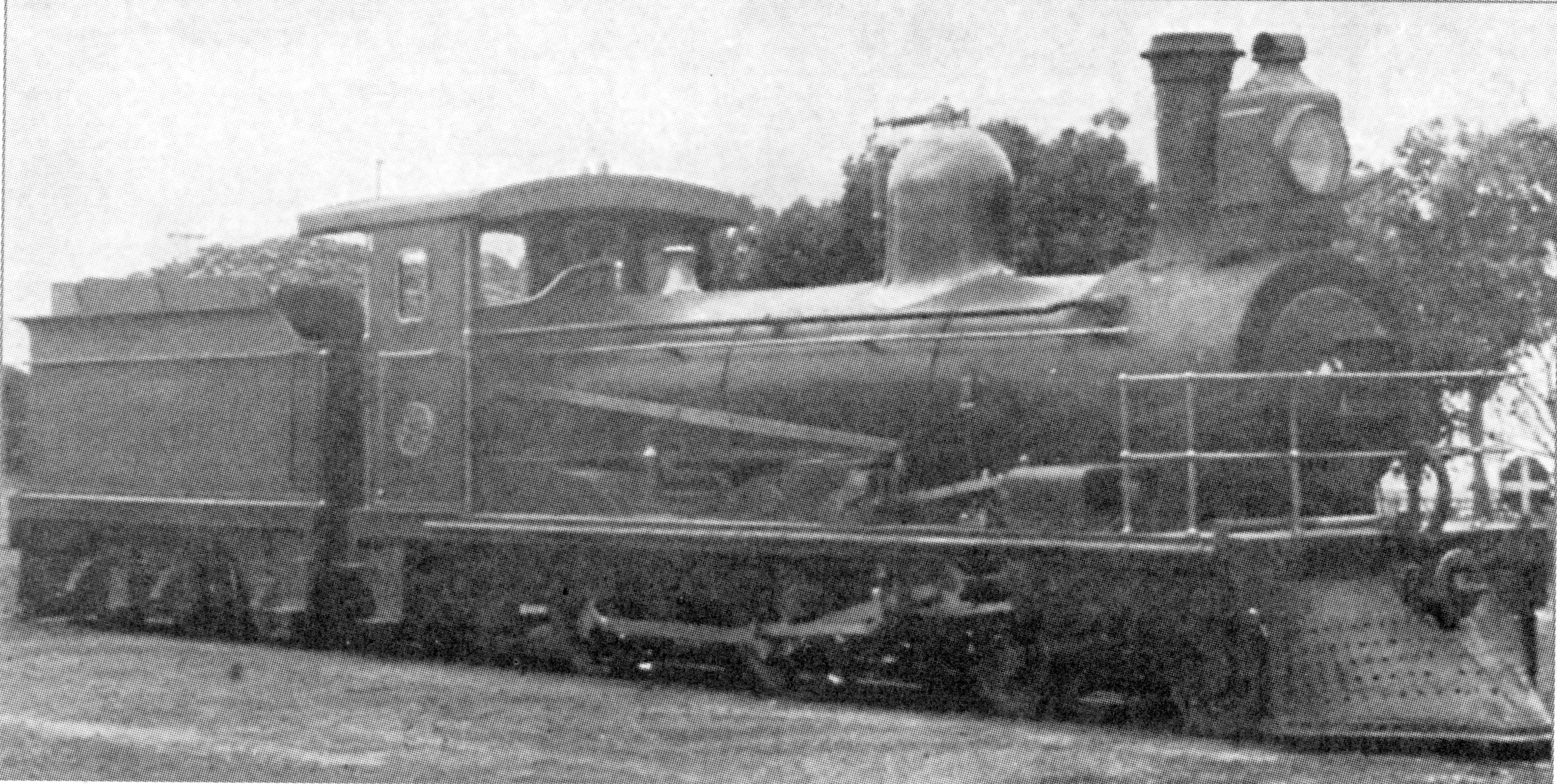
No. 646 at King William's Town on 7 November 1899

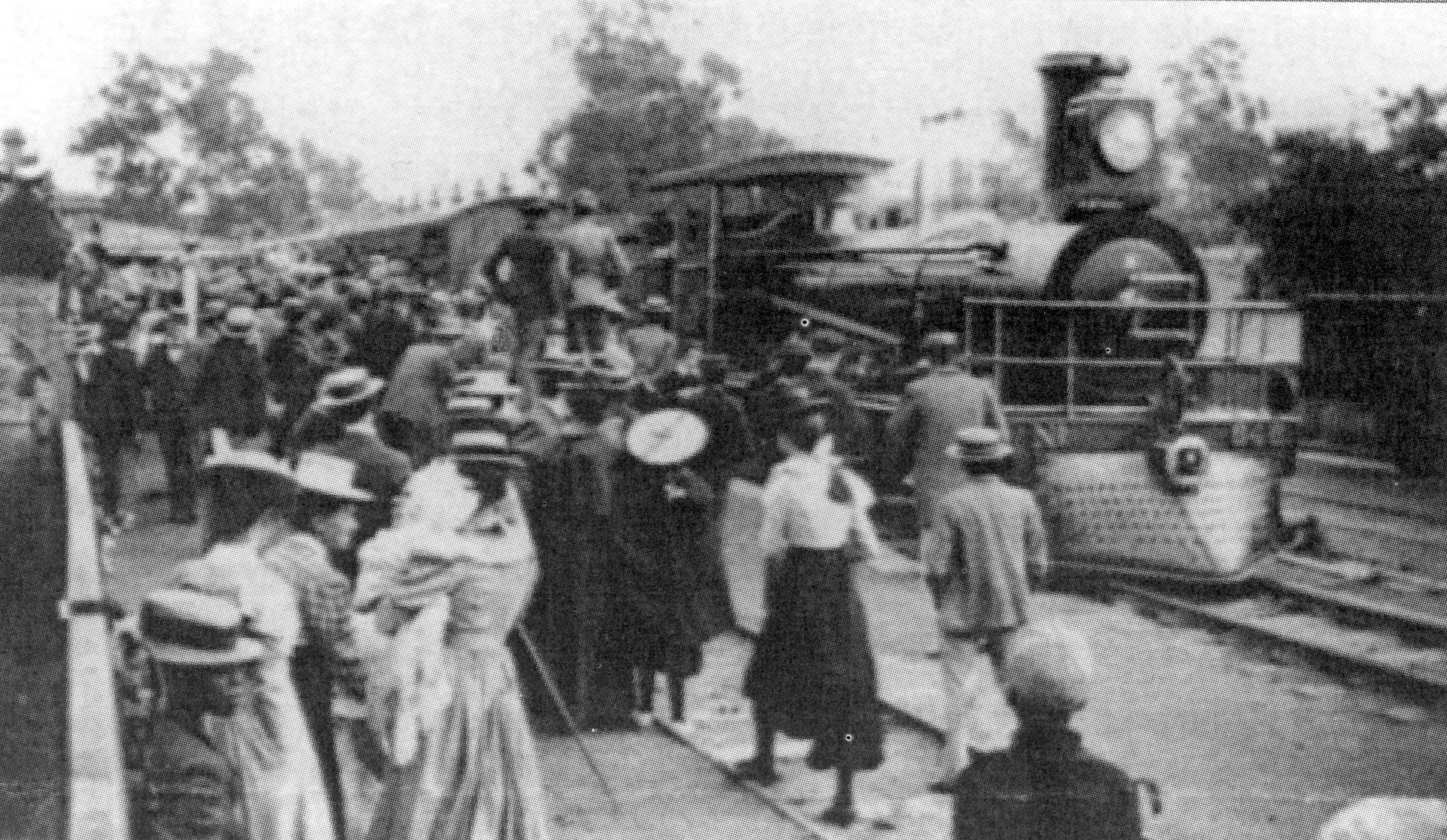
No. 646 in King William's Town station, November 1899
