= CGR 4th Class 4-6-0TT 1884 =

Class of 4 South African 4-6-0TT locomotives

CGR 4th Class 4-6-0TT 1884 South African Class 04 4-6-0 1884
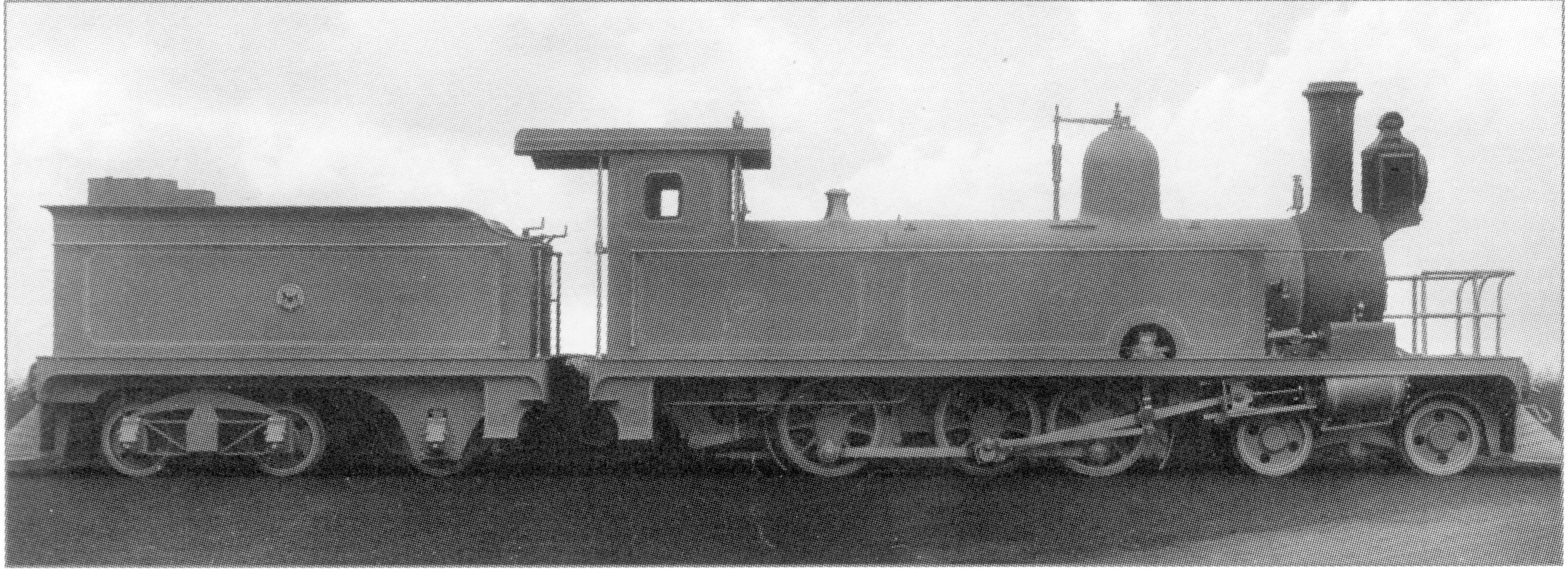
- Neilson works picture, c. 1884
Type and origin
- Power type: Steam
- Designer: Cape Government Railways (J.D. Tilney)
- Builder: Neilson and Company
- Serial number: 3068–3071
- Build date: 1883
- Total produced: 4
Specifications
- Configuration
  - Whyte: 4-6-0TT (Tenwheeler)
  - UIC: 2'Cn2t
- Driver: 2nd coupled axle
- Gauge: 3 ft 6 in (1,067 mm) Cape gauge
- Leading dia.: 27 1/2 in (698 mm)
- Coupled dia.: 38 1/2 in (978 mm)
- Tender wheels: 27 1/2 in (698 mm)
- Wheelbase: 39 ft 2 in (11,938 mm)
  - Axle spacing (Asymmetrical): 1-2: 3 ft 4 in (1,016 mm); 2-3: 4 ft 8 in (1,422 mm)
  - Engine: 18 ft 3 in (5,563 mm)
  - Leading: 5 ft (1,524 mm)
  - Coupled: 8 ft (2,438 mm)
  - Tender: 9 ft 3 in (2,819 mm)
  - Tender bogie: 4 ft 5 1/2 in (1,359 mm)
- Length
  - Over couplers: 46 ft 7 1/2 in (14,211 mm)
- Height: 12 ft (3,658 mm)
- Frame type: Plate
- Loco weight: 35 LT 1 cwt (35,610 kg)
- Tender weight: 20 LT 2 cwt 1 qtr (20,440 kg)
- Total weight: 55 LT 3 cwt 1 qtr (56,050 kg)
- Tender type: 3-axle (1 leading, 1 bogie)
- Fuel type: Coal
- Fuel capacity: 5 LT (5.1 t)
- Water cap.: 600 imp gal (2,700 L) engine 1,700 imp gal (7,700 L) tender
- Firebox
  - Type: Round-top
  - Grate area: 18.25 sq ft (1.695 m^{2})
- Boiler
  - Pitch: 5 ft 9 in (1,753 mm)
  - Diameter: 3 ft 6 in (1,067 mm)
  - Tube plates: 10 ft 4 1/2 in (3,162 mm)
  - Small tubes: 143: 1 3/4 in (44 mm)
- Boiler pressure: 130 psi (896 kPa)
- Safety valve: Salter
- Heating surface
  - Firebox: 83.23 sq ft (7.732 m^{2})
  - Tubes: 679.6 sq ft (63.14 m^{2})
  - Total surface: 762.83 sq ft (70.869 m^{2})
- Cylinders: Two
- Cylinder size: 15 in (381 mm) bore 20 in (508 mm) stroke
- Valve gear: Joy as built Stephenson converted
- Couplers: Johnston link-and-pin
Performance figures
- Tractive effort: 11,396 lbf (50.69 kN) @ 75%
Career
- Operators: Cape Government Railways; South African Railways
- Class: CGR 4th Class, SAR Class 04
- Number in class: 4
- Numbers: E49-E52
- Delivered: 1884
- First run: 1884

The Cape Government Railways 4th Class 4-6-0TT of 1884 was a South African steam locomotive from the pre-Union era in the Cape of Good Hope.

In 1884, the Cape Government Railways placed four experimental 4th Class 4-6-0 tank-and-tender locomotives in service. It was designed by John D. Tilney, the Locomotive Superintendent of the Eastern System, to be able to use the low-grade local coal with its high content of incombustible matter.

== Stormberg coalfields ==
In 1883, the extension of the Cape Government Railways (CGR) Eastern System's line from Queenstown reached Sterkstroom and passed through the Stormberg coalfields, where the Molteno and Cyphergat collieries were operating. While the Colonial coal was much cheaper than imported Welsh coal, it had a non-combustible content of as high as 29%, which led to difficulties when it was used in locomotives since it frequently caused train delays due to stops to allow the stokers to clear the grate of clinker and ash.

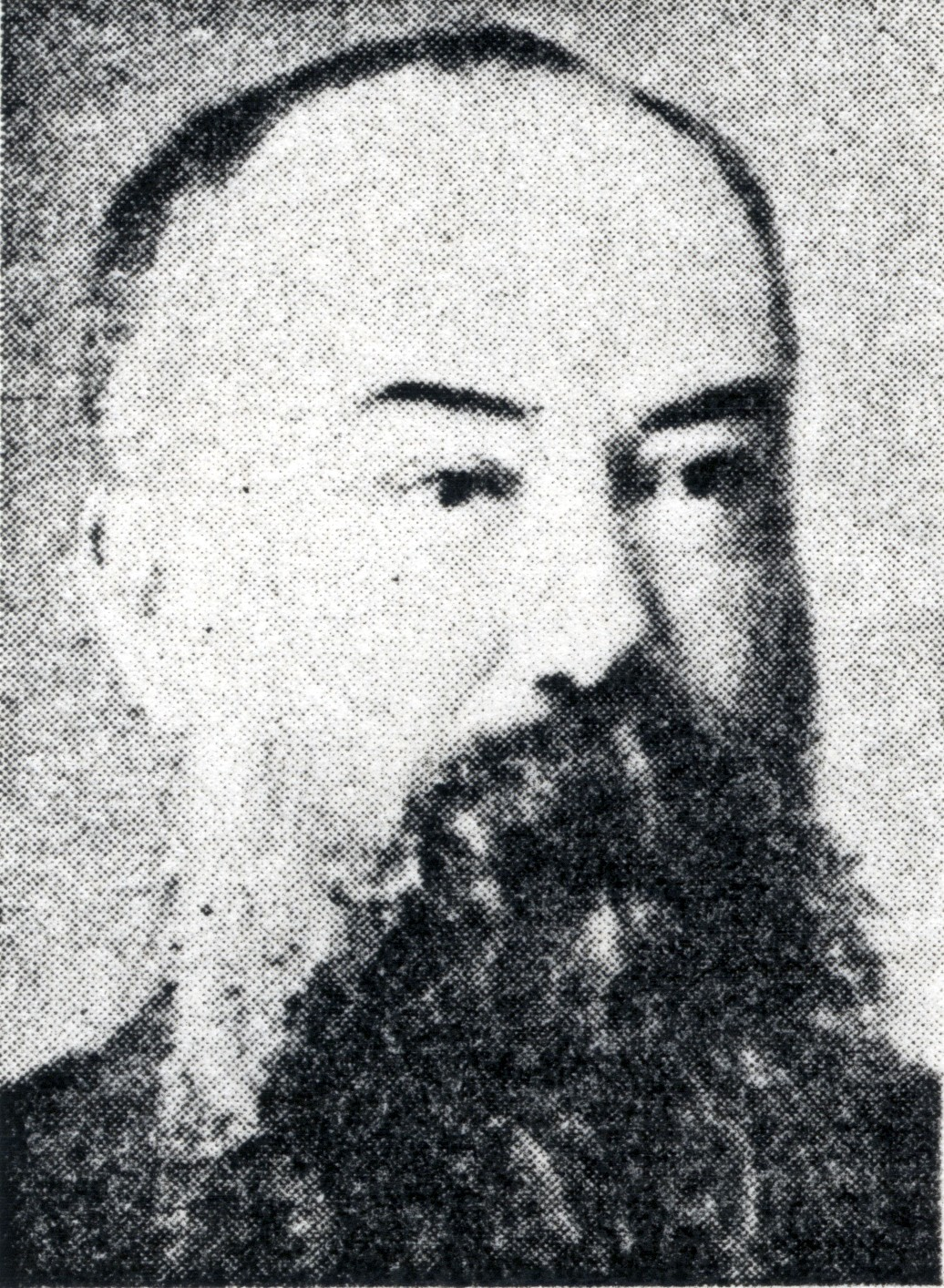
J.D. Tilney

Tests were carried out to compare the results obtained from the use of the sea-borne Merthyr coal, which was available at East London for use on down or inland journeys, and the Stormberg coal, which was used on the up or coastward return journeys. It was found that the average fuel consumption on a return journey using Stormberg coal was 63.35 pounds (28.7 kilograms) per train-mile, compared to 31.67 pounds (14.4 kilograms) per train-mile when using imported Merthyr coal.

In attempts to overcome the problem, John D. Tilney, the Eastern System's Locomotive Superintendent, carried out many experiments on some of the 4th Class locomotives which had entered service on the Eastern System in 1880 and 1882. The most significant of these experiments involved modifying the boilers and frames to accommodate oscillating firebars and larger fireboxes.

== Manufacturer ==
Based on the results of Tilney's experiments, complete sets of drawings for a 4-6-0 tank-and-tender goods locomotive as well as a 4-4-0 American type tender passenger locomotive were prepared at the CGR's Salt River shops in 1882. It was submitted to Neilson and Company for the construction of two 4-4-0 and four 4-6-0 locomotives. In 1884, the experimental 4-6-0 locomotives, numbered in the range from E49 to E52, entered service on the Eastern System for evaluation by Tilney.

== Characteristics ==
The design of the two types was an early attempt at standardisation, since the boilers and tenders and many other parts were made interchangeable. The three-axle tender was unusual, since the leading axle was mounted in a rigid frame while the other two were mounted in a bogie, a design which possibly had the aim of improving stability when running tender-first. This was the first time that a bogie was used under a tender in South Africa, but also the only time that this tender wheel arrangement was used on the CGR. This peculiar tender wheel arrangement appeared in South Africa on only one other occasion, eighteen years later on the Baldwin-built Zululand Railway Company contractor's locomotive in Natal.

Like the Neilson-built 4th Class 4-6-0TT of 1882, these locomotives were built with Joy valve gear, but they had smaller coupled wheels of 38 1/2 inches (978 millimetres) diameter. The coupled wheels were not spaced equidistant from each other, with a wheelbase of 3 feet 4 inches (1,016 millimetres) between the leading wheel and the driver and 4 feet 8 inches (1,422 millimetres) between the driver and the trailing wheel.

The locomotives gave good results in service, but were difficult to fire due to their very long and narrow grates. When better quality coal, more suitable for use in the standard locomotives, began to become available from the coalfields in Natal, no more locomotives of this experimental design were ordered.

== Service ==
=== Cape Government Railways ===
The Joy valve gear was not considered entirely satisfactory. After Michael Stephens retired and H.M. Beatty took over as Chief Locomotive Superintendent of the CGR in 1896, these locomotives were converted to Stephenson valve gear and had their side-tanks removed.

By the time the three CGR systems linked up, the system number prefixes had been done away with and these locomotives were renumbered into the range from 641 to 644. By 1904, numbers 641 and 643 no longer appeared in the CGR locomotive register.

=== South African Railways ===
When the Union of South Africa was established on 31 May 1910, the three Colonial government railways (CGR, Natal Government Railways and Central South African Railways) were united under a single administration to control and administer the railways, ports and harbours of the Union. Even though the South African Railways and Harbours came into existence in 1910, the actual classification and renumbering of all the rolling stock of the three constituent railways was only implemented with effect from 1 January 1912.

By 1912, only no. 644 survived. Like the rest of the 4th Class locomotives, it was considered obsolete by the SAR, designated Class 04 and renumbered to 0644. It was scrapped by 1918.
