= Category 4 =

Category 4 or Category IV may refer to:

- Category 4 cable, a cable that consists of four unshielded twisted-pair wires
- Category 4 fireworks, British fireworks that are for sale only to professionals
- Category 4 tropical cyclone, on any of the tropical cyclone intensity scales
  - Any of several hurricanes listed at list of Category 4 Atlantic hurricanes or list of Category 4 Pacific hurricanes
- Category 4 pandemic, on the pandemic severity index, an American influenza pandemic with a case-fatality ratio between 1% and 2%
- Category 4 winter storm, on the Northeast snowfall impact scale and the Regional snowfall index
  - Any of several winter storms listed at List of Northeast snowfall impact scale winter storms and List of regional snowfall index category 4 winter storms
- Category 04 non-silicate mineral, a non-silicate minerals for oxide minerals
- Category four stadium, a football stadium of the highest quality as ranked by the UEFA
- Category IV New Testament manuscripts, a category of New Testament manuscripts for manuscripts of the D text or Western text-type
- Category IV measurement, a measurement category for measurements performed at the source of the high-voltage installation
- Category IV vintage car condition, a very good condition category for vintage cars
- Category IV Armed Forces Qualification Test scores, a calculated ranking on the Armed Forces Qualification Test
- Category IV protected area, a protected area classification for a habitat or species management area by the International Union for Conservation of Nature

== See also ==
- Class 4 (disambiguation), class/category equivalence (for labeling)
- Type 4 (disambiguation), type/category equivalence (for labeling)
- Group 4 (disambiguation), group/category equivalence (for labeling)
