= 4T =

4T or 4-T may refer to:

== Biology and chemistry ==
- 4-T-TRIS; see Thiotrisescaline
- 4-t-butylpyrocatechol; see 4-tert-Butylcatechol
- 4T-MMDA-2; see MMDA

== Locomotives ==
- 4T class of locomotive
- LMS Stanier 2-6-4T (disambiguation)
- LMS 3-Cylindered Stanier 2-6-4T
- LMS Fairburn 2-6-4T
- LMS Fowler 2-6-4T
- Bristol and Exeter Railway 4-2-4T locomotives
- LMS/BR Class 4 2-6-4T locomotives
- BR Standard Class 4 2-6-4T
- LMS 2-Cylindered Stanier 2-6-4T
- L&YR Hughes 4-6-4T
- LMS Stanier Class 2 0-4-4T
- Highland Railway Drummond 0-6-4T Class
- Highland Railway Drummond 0-4-4T Class
- 0-8-4T
- 2-6-4T; see 2-6-4
- 0-4-4T; see 0-4-4
- 4-6-4T; see 4-6-4
- 0-6-4T; see 0-6-4
- 2-8-4T; see 2-8-4
- 2-2-4T; see 2-2-4
- 2-4-4T; see 2-4-4

== Other ==
- 4T, alias for Four Tet, musician
- 4T-GTE, a model of Toyota T engine
- 4T, a model of LWD Szpak, a Polish utility aircraft
- Piaggio Zip 4T, an urban scooter
- 4T, the production code for the 1977 Doctor Who serial The Invisible Enemy
- Fourth Transformation, 2018 campaign promise by Mexico's president to do away with abuses that plagued that nation
- 4T, an abbreviation for a four-cycle engine, from the German viertakt

== See also ==
- The Four T's (disambiguation)
- T4 (disambiguation)
- TTTT
