= John D. Tilney =

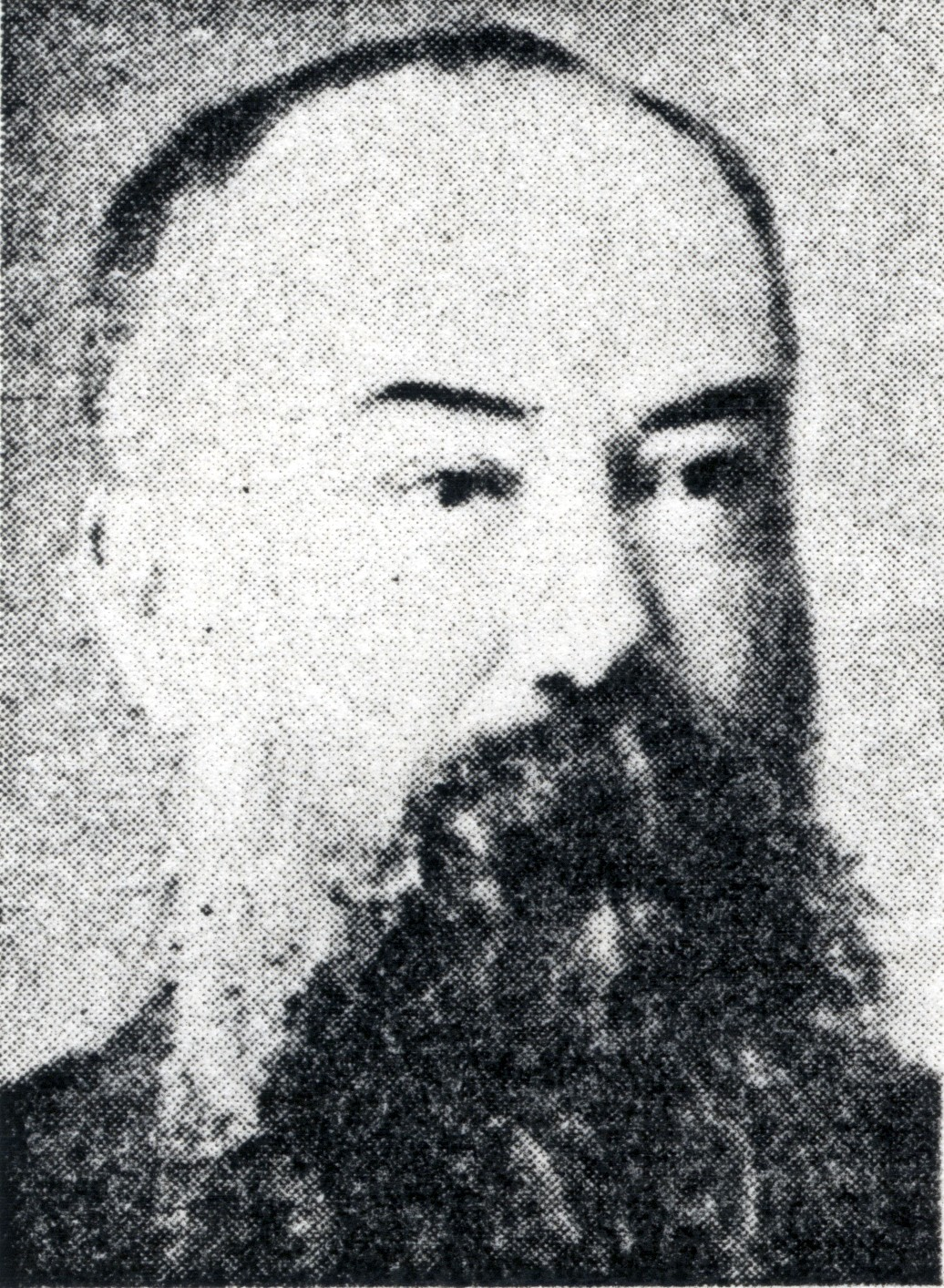
J.D. Tilney

John D. Tilney was Cape Government Railways (Eastern System) Locomotive Superintendent (1874-1904).

Tilney carried out several experiments on some of the CGR 4th Class 4-6-0TT locomotives of 1880. One of his modifications was an extended smokebox to make room for a very efficient spark arrester, constructed of wire mesh. Another involved modifying the boiler and frame to accommodate oscillating firebars and a larger firebox to overcome the problems associated with the low-grade local coal from the Cyphergat collieries. Mechanical firegrate shaking was accomplished by means of a collar on the leading coupled axle which could be engaged by a roller with eccentrically mounted connecting rods to the oscillating firebars.
