= Fourth class (disambiguation) =

Fourth class is a passenger seating class in transportation, one of the lowest classes with least frills or features

4th class or variation, may also refer to:

== Transportation ==
- Fourth-class mail, in postal delivery
- Cape Government Railways 4th Class locomotives

== Honours ==
- Fourth-class honours, in British education
- Order of St. George, 4th Class of Russia
- Order of the Red Eagle, 4th Class Knight of Prussia
- 4th class Military Merit Order (Bavaria)

== Rank or grade in military or paramilitary ==
- Specialist fourth class, a military rank
- Technician Fourth Class, a military rank

== Other uses ==
- 4th class city in Missouri; see List of cities in Missouri

== See also ==
- Class 4 (disambiguation)
- Delta class (disambiguation)
- Fourth (disambiguation)
- Four (disambiguation)
- Class (disambiguation)
