= Class 04 =

Class 04 may refer to:

- British Rail Class 04, a class of post-war, British diesel-mechanical shunter
- DRG Class 04, a class of inter-war, German, experimental, high-pressure, steam locomotive, derived from the DRG Class 03, which did not go into full production.

== See also ==
- Class 4 (disambiguation)
