= Type 4 =

Type 4, Type Four or Type IV may refer to:

== Military ==
- Type 4 Chi-To, a Japanese tank
- Type 4 Ke-Nu, a Japanese tank
- Type 4 Ka-Tsu, a Japanese amphibious landing craft
- Type 4 Ho-Ro, a Japanese self-propelled gun
- Type 4 Ha-To, a Japanese self-propelled gun
- Type 4 75 mm AA gun, a Japanese anti-aircraft gun
- Rota Gun, anti-tank rocket launchers
- Type 4 20 cm rocket launcher, a Japanese mortar rocket
- Type 4 15 cm howitzer, a Japanese howitzer
- Type 4 rifle, a Japanese experimental rifle
- Chinese designation for the domestic 8mm copy of the Mauser Model 1904

== Transportation ==
- British Railways Type 4 Diesel locomotives
- Type Four platform, a front-wheel-drive car platform
- Volkswagen Type 4, a four-door sedan
- Peugeot Type 4

== Other uses ==
- Type 4 encryption, an encryption algorithm
- Type IV collagen, a class of collagen
- Type-4 hypersensitivity, a class of Hypersensitivity reactions that involves T-cells
- IEC Type IV, one of the four "type" classifications of audio cassette formulation
- Cooper Mark I, aka Cooper Type 4, a sports car

== See also ==
- 4 (disambiguation)
- Category 4 (disambiguation)
- Class 4 (disambiguation)
- T4 (disambiguation)
