= The Four T's =

The Four T's or 4 T's may refer to:

- A mnemonic for tumours in the anterior mediastinum
- A score for estimating the likelihood of heparin-induced thrombocytopenia
- The plural of several things known as 4T - see 4T (disambiguation)

== See also ==
- T4 (disambiguation)
- TTTT
