= NGR Class I 2-6-0 =

Type of steam locomotive

Zululand Railway 2-6-0 NGR Class I 2-6-0
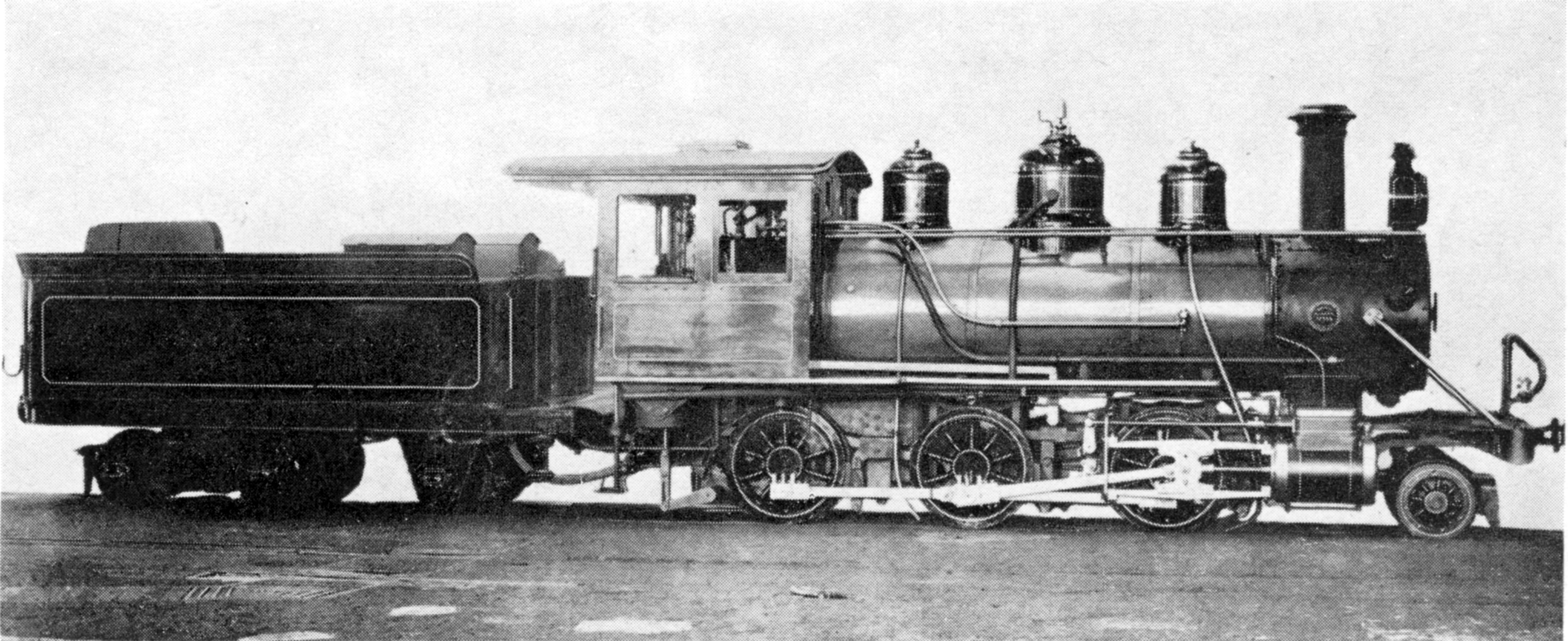
- Zululand Railway Company no. 2, c. 1902
Type and origin
- Power type: Steam
- Designer: Baldwin Locomotive Works
- Builder: Baldwin Locomotive Works
- Serial number: 18566-18567
- Build date: 1901
- Total produced: 2
Specifications
- Configuration
  - Whyte: 2-6-0 (Mogul)
  - UIC: 1'Cn2
- Driver: 2nd coupled axle
- Gauge: 3 ft 6 in (1,067 mm) Cape gauge
- Leading dia.: 26 in (660 mm)
- Coupled dia.: 42 in (1,067 mm)
- Tender wheels: 28 1/2 in (724 mm)
- Wheelbase: 38 ft 2 in (11,633 mm)
  - Axle spacing (Asymmetrical): 1-2: 5 ft 5 in (1,651 mm); 2-3: 5 ft 4 in (1,626 mm)
  - Engine: 18 ft (5,486 mm)
  - Coupled: 10 ft 9 in (3,277 mm)
  - Tender: 10 ft (3,048 mm)
  - Tender bogie: 4 ft 6 in (1,372 mm)
- Length
  - Over couplers: 46 ft 6 in (14,173 mm)
- Height: 12 ft 3 in (3,734 mm)
- Frame type: Bar
- Axle load: 9 LT 16 cwt 3 qtr (9,995 kg)
  - Leading: 2 LT 19 cwt (2,997 kg)
  - 1st coupled: 9 LT 2 cwt 3 qtr (9,284 kg)
  - 2nd coupled: 9 LT 16 cwt 3 qtr (9,995 kg)
  - 3rd coupled: 9 LT 6 cwt 3 qtr (9,487 kg)
- Adhesive weight: 28 LT 6 cwt 1 qtr (28,770 kg)
- Loco weight: 31 LT 5 cwt 1 qtr (31,760 kg)
- Tender weight: 22 LT (22,350 kg)
- Total weight: 53 LT 5 cwt 1 qtr (54,120 kg)
- Tender type: 3-axle (1 leading, 1 bogie)
- Fuel type: Coal
- Fuel capacity: 6 LT (6.1 t)
- Water cap.: 2,000 imp gal (9,090 L)
- Firebox
  - Type: Round-top
  - Grate area: 13.7 sq ft (1.27 m^{2})
- Boiler
  - Pitch: 5 ft 9 in (1,753 mm)
  - Tube plates: 9 ft 6 in (2,896 mm)
- Boiler pressure: 160 psi (1,103 kPa)
- Heating surface
  - Firebox: 67 sq ft (6.2 m^{2})
  - Tubes: 675 sq ft (62.7 m^{2})
  - Total surface: 742 sq ft (68.9 m^{2})
- Cylinders: Two
- Cylinder size: 15 in (381 mm) bore 18 in (457 mm) stroke
- Valve gear: Stephenson
- Couplers: Johnston link-and-pin
Performance figures
- Tractive effort: 11,570 lbf (51 kN) @ 75%
Career
- Operators: Zululand Railway Co. Natal Government Railways
- Class: NGR Class I
- Number in class: 2
- Numbers: ZRC 2-3, NGR 513-514 & 502-503
- Delivered: 1902
- First run: 1902
- Withdrawn: 1930

The Natal Government Railways Class I 2-6-0 of 1902 was a South African steam locomotive from the pre-Union era in the Colony of Natal.

In 1902, the Zululand Railway Company, contractors for the construction of the North Coast line from Verulam to the Tugela River, acquired two 2-6-0 tender locomotives as construction engines. Upon completion of the line, the locomotives were taken onto the roster of the Natal Government Railways in 1903 and later designated Class I.

== The Zululand Railway Co. ==
In December 1895, an agreement was reached with the Natal sugar magnate James Liege Hulett, representing the Zululand Railway Company, for the construction of the North Coast line from Verulam to the Tugela River. The contract stipulated that the line was to be 3 feet 6 inches Cape gauge and laid with 45 pounds per yard (22 kilograms per metre) steel rail. The agreement further stipulated that, upon its completion, the line would be taken over as part of the Natal Government Railways (NGR) system.

== Manufacturer ==
In 1901, the construction company acquired a single 2-6-2 tank locomotive from Baldwin Locomotive Works in the United States of America. In 1902, two 2-6-0 tender locomotives were added, designed and built by the same manufacturer. They were built to American specifications and narrow-gauge practice at the time and conformed to NGR practice only in respect of their Johnston link-and-pin couplers and brake gear. The two tender locomotives became the Zululand Railway engines numbers 2 and 3.

The three-axle tenders had an unusual wheel arrangement, with the front axle mounted in a rigid frame and the other two axles in a bogie. A similar tender wheel arrangement had first been used in 1884 on the experimental 3rd Class 4-4-0 and 4th class 4-6-0TT locomotives of the Cape Government Railways (CGR). It was not used in South Africa again.

== Service ==
The Tugela line was opened to traffic in 1903 and the two locomotives were taken onto the NGR roster, where they were allocated numbers 513 and 514.

They were later renumbered to 502 and 503 and allocated to the Construction Department of the NGR. When a classification system was introduced at some stage between 1904 and 1908, they were designated NGR Class I.

When the Union of South Africa was established on 31 May 1910, the three Colonial government railways (Cape Government Railways, NGR and Central South African Railways) were united under a single administration to control and administer the railways, ports and harbours of the Union. Although the South African Railways and Harbours came into existence in 1910, the actual classification and renumbering of all the rolling stock of the three constituent railways were only implemented with effect from 1 January 1912.

In 1912, the NGR Construction Department locomotives were considered obsolete and were excluded from the SAR classification and renumbering schedules. These two locomotives were renumbered to 0502 and 0503 and remained unclassified. In spite of being considered obsolete, the two engines remained in service for several more years and were only scrapped in March 1928 and June 1930 respectively.
