= T4 =

T4 or T-4 may refer to:

== Airports and airlines ==
- Heathrow Terminal 4
- Tiyas Military Airbase, also known as the T-4 Airbase

== Biology and medicine ==
- T4 phage, a bacteriophage
- Thyroxine (T_{4}), a form of thyroid hormone
- T4 or thoracic spinal nerve 4
- the fourth thoracic vertebrae of the vertebral column
- A non-small cell lung carcinoma staging for a type of tumour
- A CD4 + T lymphocyte
- T4: an EEG electrode site according to the 10-20 system
- T_{4}, a tumor class in the TNM staging system

== Entertainment ==
- T4 (Channel 4), the former daytime teen-aimed slot on Channel 4 in the UK
- Terminator Salvation, sometimes referred to as Terminator 4
- Transformers: Age of Extinction, the fourth film in the live-action Transformers film series

== Software and video games ==
- Text Template Transformation Toolkit, a technology developed by Microsoft
- Tekken 4, a 2001 fighting game

== Rail transport ==
- T4 Eastern Suburbs & Illawarra Line, a Sydney Trains railway service, Australia
- Île-de-France tramway Line 4
- T4 (Istanbul Tram)
- Cleveland line (numbered T4), a Queensland Rail service, Australia
- Shorncliffe line (numbered T4), a Queensland Rail service, Australia

== Vehicles ==
- Dayton-Wright T-4, a 1918 American light, single-seat reconnaissance aircraft
- Kawasaki T-4, a Japanese aircraft
- Soyuz T-4, a space mission
- Sukhoi T-4, a Soviet aircraft
- Tatra T4, a 1967 Czechoslovak tram
- Thaden T-4, a 1930s American four-seat all-metal cabin monoplane
- Troller T4, a Brazilian off-road vehicle
- Volkswagen Transporter series IV van
- a model of the OS T1000 train of the Oslo Metro
- Model T4 Cunningham experimental armored car, later the M1 Armored car

== Weapons and explosives ==
- T-4 Atomic Demolition Munition, a small tactical nuclear bomb
- G7e/T4, a Falke German torpedo
- The Italian name for the high explosive RDX

== Other uses ==
- Great East Road, a road in Zambia
- T4 road (Tanzania), a road in Tanzania
- Lockheed Martin's High beta fusion reactor prototype, called T4
- A T4 slip, a tax return form used in income taxes in Canada
- Aktion T4, Nazi Germany's mass-murder of the mentally and physically disabled
- Normal space in topology
- Version 4 of Traveller role-playing game
- T4, one of several fluorescent-lamp formats
- A tornado intensity rating on the TORRO scale
- SPARC T4, a microprocessor introduced by Oracle Microelectronics in 2011

== See also ==
- The Four T's (disambiguation)
- 4T (disambiguation)
- TTTT
- Type 4 (disambiguation)
