= Group 4 =

Group 4 may refer to:

- Group 4 element, chemical element classification
- Group 4 (motorsport), classification for cars in auto racing and rallying
- G4S, formerly Group 4 Securicor, a prominent British security company
- IB Group 4 subjects, subject group for the experimental sciences in the International Baccalaureate program
- Group 4 image format, Group 3 & Group 4 are digital technical standards for image compressing and sending in faxes, and in the Tagged Image File Format (TIFF)
- Group of Four, the Group of Four (also known as G4) is a coalition of Brazil, Germany, India and Japan, who seek to reform membership in the United Nations Security Council
- Group 4 (company), a defunct British security company
- "Group Four", a song from Massive Attack's album, Mezzanine
