= LMS Stanier 2-6-4T =

LMS Stanier 2-6-4T may refer to two related types of steam locomotive:

- LMS 2-Cylindered Stanier 2-6-4T (Nos. (4) 2425-94 and (4) 2537-672)
- LMS 3-Cylindered Stanier 2-6-4T (Nos. (4) 2500-36)
