= Class 4 =

Class 4 may refer to:

- British Rail Class 04, British diesel shunting locomotive
- BR Standard Class 4 4-6-0, British steam locomotive
- BR Standard Class 4 2-6-0, British steam locomotive
- BR Standard Class 4 2-6-4T, British steam locomotive
- Class 4 telephone switch
- Class 4, contribution class in the National Insurance system in the UK.
- NSB Class IV, Norwegian narrow-gauge steam locomotive
- NSB El 4, Norwegian electric locomotive
- NSB Di 4, Norwegian diesel locomotive
- SCORE Class 4, off-road racing vehicles
- Speed Class Rating, official unit of speed measurement for SD Cards
- TS Class 4, a tram used in Trondheim, Norway
- Class 4 truck, US truck class for medium trucks, up to 16,000 pounds weight limit
- The fourth class in terms of hiking difficulty in the Yosemite Decimal System
- Missouri Class 4 city

== See also ==
- Class 04 (disambiguation)
- Fourth class (disambiguation)
- Delta class (disambiguation)
- Type 4 (disambiguation)
