= CGR 4th Class 4-6-0TT 1882 Joy =

Type of steam locomotive

CGR 4th Class 4-6-0TT 1882 Joy OVGS 4th Class G 4-6-0 South African Class 04 4-6-0
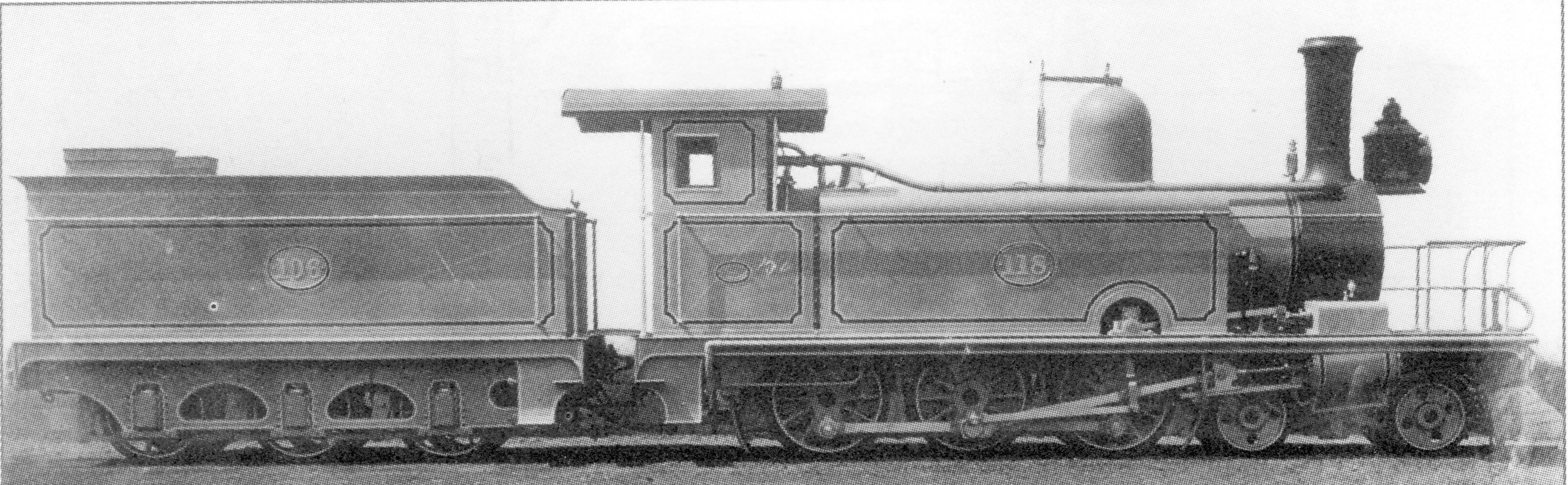
- As built with side tanks and short firebox, c. 1882
Type and origin
- Power type: Steam
- Designer: Cape Government Railways (Michael Stephens)
- Builder: Neilson and Company
- Serial number: 2828-2848, 2951-2954, 2978-2987
- Build date: 1882-1883
- Total produced: 35
Specifications
- Configuration
  - Whyte: 4-6-0TT as built (Tenwheeler); 4-6-0 converted
  - UIC: 2'Cn2t as built 2'Cn2 converted
- Driver: 2nd coupled axle
- Gauge: 3 ft 6 in (1,067 mm) Cape gauge
- Leading dia.: 27 1/2 in (698 mm)
- Coupled dia.: 42 in (1,067 mm)
- Tender wheels: 36 1/2 in (927 mm)
- Wheelbase: 35 ft 3/8 in (10,678 mm)
  - Engine: 16 ft 10 in (5,131 mm)
  - Leading: 5 ft (1,524 mm)
  - Coupled: 8 ft (2,438 mm)
  - Tender: 8 ft (2,438 mm)
- Length
  - Over couplers: 43 ft 2 3/8 in (13,167 mm)
- Height: 12 ft (3,658 mm)
- Axle load: 7 LT 16 cwt (7,925 kg)
  - Leading: 8 LT 16 cwt (8,941 kg)
  - 1st coupled: 5 LT 17 cwt (5,944 kg)
  - 2nd coupled: 7 LT 9 cwt (7,570 kg)
  - 3rd coupled: 7 LT 16 cwt (7,925 kg)
- Adhesive weight: 21 LT 2 cwt (21,440 kg)
- Loco weight: 29 LT 18 cwt (30,380 kg)
- Tender weight: 19 LT (19,300 kg)
- Total weight: 48 LT 18 cwt (49,680 kg)
- Tender type: 3-axle
- Fuel type: Coal
- Fuel capacity: 3 LT (3.0 t)
- Water cap.: 600 imp gal (2,730 L) engine 1,700 imp gal (7,730 L) tender
- Firebox
  - Type: Round-top
  - Grate area: 11.7 sq ft (1.09 m^{2})
- Boiler
  - Pitch: 5 ft 9 in (1,753 mm)
  - Diameter: 3 ft 6 3/8 in (1,076 mm)
  - Tube plates: 10 ft 4 1/2 in (3,162 mm)
- Boiler pressure: 140 psi (965 kPa)
- Safety valve: Salter as built Ramsbottom reboilered
- Heating surface
  - Firebox: 61.6 sq ft (5.72 m^{2})
  - Tubes: 690 sq ft (64 m^{2})
  - Total surface: 751.6 sq ft (69.83 m^{2})
- Cylinders: Two
- Cylinder size: 15 in (381 mm) bore 20 in (508 mm) stroke
- Valve gear: Joy as built Stephenson converted
- Couplers: Johnston link-and-pin
Performance figures
- Tractive effort: 11,250 lbf (50.0 kN) @ 75%
Career
- Operators: Cape Government Railways; OVGS; Beira & Mashonaland Railway; South African Railways
- Class: CGR 4th, OVGS G, SAR 04
- Number in class: 35
- Numbers: W56-W76, M76-M79, E39-E48
- Nicknames: Joy & Converted Joy
- Delivered: 1882-1883
- First run: 1882
- Withdrawn: c. 1932

The Cape Government Railways 4th Class 4-6-0TT of 1882 with Joy valve gear, was a South African steam locomotive from the pre-Union era in the Cape of Good Hope.

In 1882 and 1883, the Cape Government Railways placed 68 4th Class 4-6-0 tank-and-tender locomotives in mainline service on all three its systems. It was an improved version of the 4th Class locomotives of 1880 and 1881 and was delivered in two versions, built by two manufacturers.

Of these locomotives, thirty-five were built by Neilson and Company with Joy valve gear. Seventeen of them were still in service when the South African Railways was established in 1912.

== Manufacturers ==
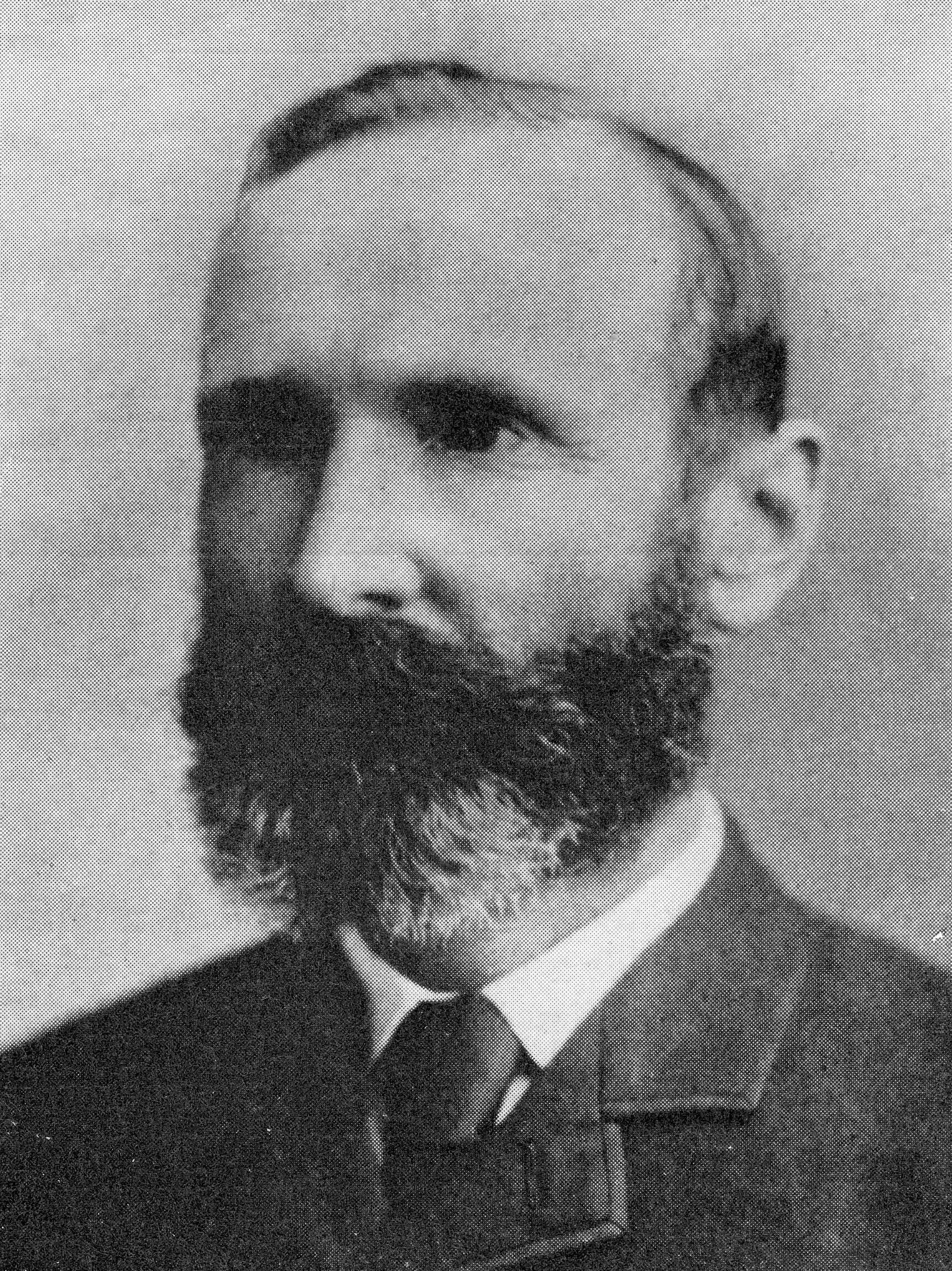
Michael Stephens

The 4th Class 4-6-0TT tank-and-tender locomotive of 1880 had been designed by Michael Stephens, at that stage the Locomotive Superintendent of the Western System of the Cape Government Railways (CGR). This improved version was delivered to the CGR in 1882 and 1883. The contracts for their construction were divided between Robert Stephenson and Company and Neilson and Company. Robert Stephenson's built thirty-three locomotives with Stephenson valve gear.

Thirty-five were built by Neilson's, but with Joy valve gear. Of these, twenty-one locomotives went to the Western System operating out of Cape Town and were numbered in the range from W56 to W76. Four went to the Midland System operating out of Port Elizabeth and were numbered in the range from M76 to M79. Ten went to the Eastern System operating out of East London and were numbered in the range from E39 to E48.

== Characteristics ==
All these locomotives had 42-inch (1,067-millimetre) diameter coupled wheels, unlike the six 4th Class locomotives which had been delivered to the Eastern System in 1880 and 1881 which had smaller 38-inch (965-millimetre) diameter coupled wheels. They were delivered with Joy valve gear and therefore had a semi-circular cut-out at the bottom of the side-tanks to allow access to part of the Joy valve gear mechanism which protruded above the running board.

Since these locomotives were delivered with permanently coupled tenders, their cabs did not need side entrances with double handrails like their predecessors of 1880 and 1881 did with their optional tenders. Access was by pairs of steps, mounted on the engine as well as on the tender, with one handrail attached to the engine and the other to the tender.

== Modifications ==
=== Firebox ===
On the Eastern System, problems were experienced with the low-grade local coal from the Cyphergat and Molteno collieries in the Stormberg. It had a high content of non-combustible material which often caused delays since it required frequent stops to allow the stoker to clear the grate of clinker and ash, a tedious task which required the locomotive to be stationary.

John D. Tilney, the Eastern System Locomotive Superintendent, carried out many experiments in an attempt to overcome the coal problem. Some of these involved modifying some of the 4th Class locomotives to install oscillating firebars and larger fireboxes.

=== Spark arrester ===
Another modification by Tilney was an extended smokebox to make room for a very efficient spark arrester which was constructed of wire mesh. Several locomotives were altered to incorporate these spark arresters.

Tilney's initiatives did not pass unnoticed. In 1881, the General Manager appointed Hawthorne R. Thornton as Chief Locomotive Superintendent for the whole of the Cape of Good Hope in response to the "growing tendency on the part of the several Locomotive Superintendents to bring in modifications of designs in essential parts of the engines and rolling stock".

=== Smokebox ===
In the 1890s, some improvements to smokebox design took place. Extending the smokebox forward increased its volume. The increased amount of exhaust gases present in the smokebox had the effect of stabilising and improving the draught. The date of this improvement can be pinned to 1891 when the second batch of Michael Stephens’ Cape Government Railways (CGR) 5th Class 4-6-0 locomotives with their lengthened smokeboxes entered service. This had such a profound effect on the boiler’s steaming ability that virtually every locomotive on the CGR and NGR had their smokeboxes extended.

=== Converted Joys ===
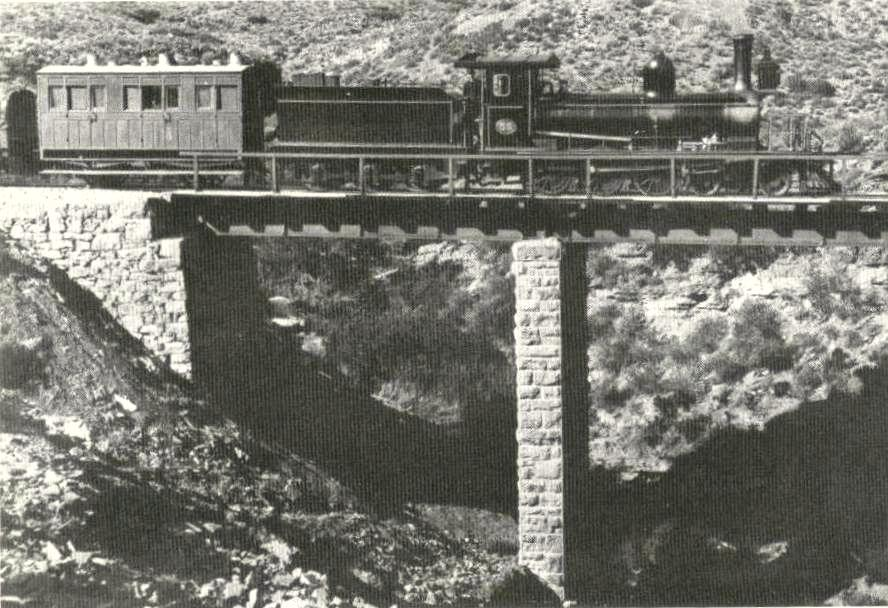
4th Class Converted Joy in the Hex River railpass

While the locomotives proved to be good all-purpose engines, the Joy valve gear was not considered entirely satisfactory. After Michael Stephens retired and H.M. Beatty took over as Chief Locomotive Superintendent of the CGR in 1896, all the Neilson-built locomotives were converted to Stephenson valve gear and in the process also had their side-tanks removed. These modified tender locomotives became known as the Converted Joys.

== Renumbering ==
All these locomotives were renumbered more than once during their service lives on the CGR. By 1886, the system prefixes had been done away with and the Midland System's locomotives had all been renumbered by replacing the letter prefix "M" with the numeral "1". The Western and Eastern System locomotives retained their numbers, but without their respective "W" or "E" prefixes. By 1888, the Eastern System locomotives had been renumbered into the 600 number range. The Midland System locomotives were renumbered to two-digit numbers by 1890. All these renumberings are listed in the table below.

In addition to the known numbering and renumbering, there appears to have been an intermediate CGR numbering system at some stage between 1884 and the renumbering of the late 1880s. Apart from photographic evidence, no information about this numbering system has been found as yet. An example is the picture below of no. 289 working near Bulawayo in Southern Rhodesia in 1897. This engine was used during the construction of the railway from Mafeking in the Cape of Good Hope via Bechuanaland to Bulawayo and was at the head of the first train to reach Bulawayo on 19 October 1897.

== Service ==
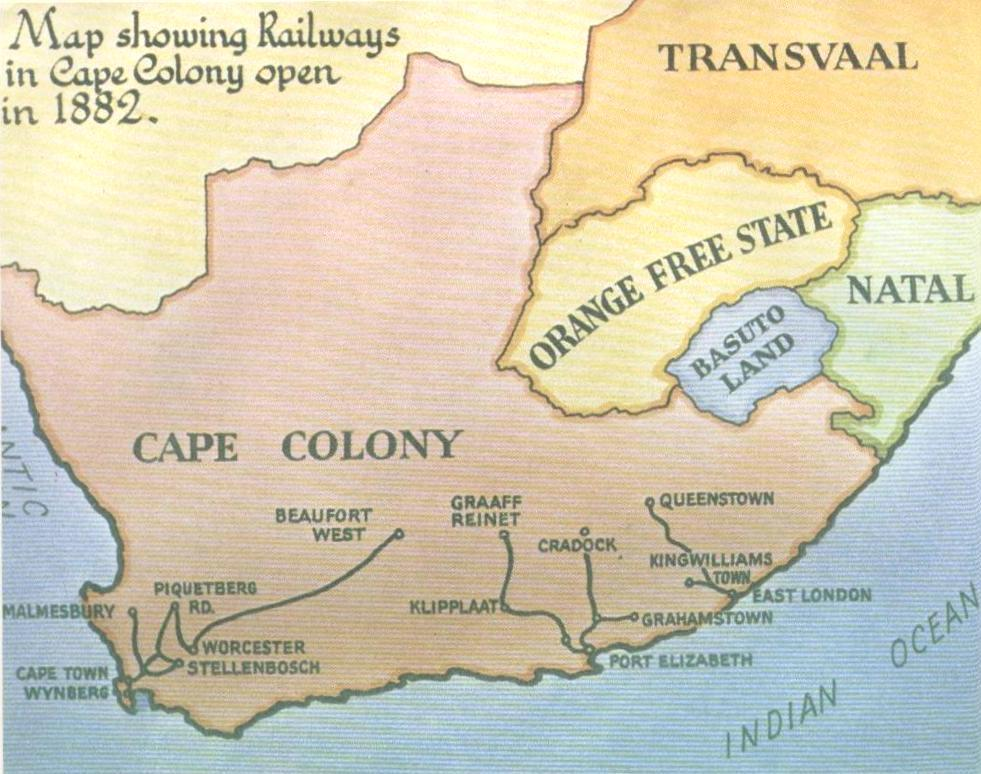

=== Cape Government Railways ===
At the time these 4th Class locomotives entered service in 1882, the two Eastern System mainlines were open to King William's Town and approaching Sterkstroom respectively. Those of the Midland System were completed to Graaff Reinet and approaching Cradock respectively, while the Western System mainline was open to Beaufort West.

=== Oranje-Vrijstaat Gouwerment-Spoorwegen ===
In early 1897, six Converted Joy locomotives were sold to the Oranje-Vrijstaat Gouwerment-Spoorwegen (OVGS), where they were designated 4th Class G. These engines were all fitted with the Tilney-designed extended smokebox with spark arresters and had been reboilered prior to entering service on the OVGS. During reboilering, their Salter safety valves were replaced with the Ramsbottom type.

=== Beira and Mashonaland Railway ===
In 1898, two Converted Joy locomotives, numbers 59 and 71, were sold to Pauling and Company. Pauling's used them during the construction of the Beira and Mashonaland Railway and renumbered them 2 and 1 respectively.

=== South African Railways ===
When the Union of South Africa was established on 31 May 1910, the three Colonial government railways (CGR, Natal Government Railways and Central South African Railways) were united under a single administration to control and administer the railways, ports and harbours of the Union. Although the South African Railways and Harbours came into existence in 1910, the actual classification and renumbering of all the rolling stock of the three constituent railways was only implemented with effect from 1 January 1912.

By 1912, seventeen of these locomotives survived. They were considered obsolete by the South African Railways, designated Class 04 and renumbered by having the numeral "0" prefixed to their existing numbers. Despite being considered obsolete, some of them were still being employed as shunting locomotives in Port Elizabeth in 1932. The rest had been scrapped by 1918.

=== First World War ===
In 1915, shortly after the outbreak of the First World War, the German South West Africa colony was occupied by the Union Defence Forces. Since a large part of the territory's railway infrastructure and rolling stock was destroyed or damaged by retreating German forces, an urgent need arose for locomotives for use on the Cape gauge lines in that territory. In 1917, numbers 058, 060 to 064, 066 and 0631 were transferred to the Defence Department for service in South West Africa. All eight locomotives are believed to have returned to South Africa after the war.

== Works numbers ==
The works numbers, years built, original numbers, renumbering and disposal of the Cape 4th Class Joy of 1882 are listed in the table.

CGR 4th Class 4-6-0TT of 1882 (Joy)
Works no.	Year blt.	Orig. no.	1886 no.	1888 no.	1890 no.	1896 no.	1899 no.	1904 no.	SAR no.	Sold to
2828	1882	W56	56	56	56	56	Class G			OVGS
2829	1882	W57	57	57	57	57	Class G			OVGS
2830	1882	W58	58	58	58	58	58	58	058	
2831	1882	W59	59	59	59	59	2			Beira
2832	1882	W60	60	60	60	60	60	60	060	
2833	1882	W61	61	61	61	61	61	61	061	
2834	1882	W62	62	62	62	62	62	62	062	
2835	1882	W63	63	63	63	63	63	63	063	
2836	1882	W64	64	64	64	64	64	64	064	
2837	1882	W65	65	65	65	65	65	65	065	
2838	1882	W66	66	66	66	66	66	66	066	
2839	1882	W67	67	67	67	67	67	67	067	
2840	1882	W68	68	68	68	68	Class G			OVGS
2841	1882	W69	69	69	69	69	Class G			OVGS
2842	1882	W70	70	70	70					
2843	1882	W71	71	71	71	71	1			Beira
2844	1882	W72	72	72	72					
2845	1882	W73	73	73	73	73	73	73	073	
2846	1882	W74	74	74	74	74	Class G			OVGS
2847	1882	W75	75	75	75	75	75	75		
2848	1882	W76	76	76	76					
2951	1883	E39	39	631	631	631	631	631	0631	
2952	1883	E40	40	632	632	632	632	632		
2953	1883	E41	41	633	633	633	633	633		
2954	1883	E42	42	634	634	634	634	634		
2980	1883	E43	43	635	635	635	635	635		
2981	1883	E44	44	636	636	636	636	636	0636	
2978	1883	E45	45	637	637	637	637	637	0637	
2979	1883	E46	46	638	638	638	638	638	0638	
2982	1883	E47	47	639	639	639	639	639		
2983	1883	E48	48	640	640	640	640	640	0640	
2984	1883	M76	176	176	52					
2985	1883	M77	177	177	53	53	Class G			OVGS
2986	1883	M78	178	178	54	54	54	54	054	
2987	1883	M79	179	179	55	55	55	55	055	

== Illustration ==
The following pictures illustrate some of the Converted Joy locomotives and the modifications done to them. Most of them had forfeited their "front porch" railings in the process of modification.

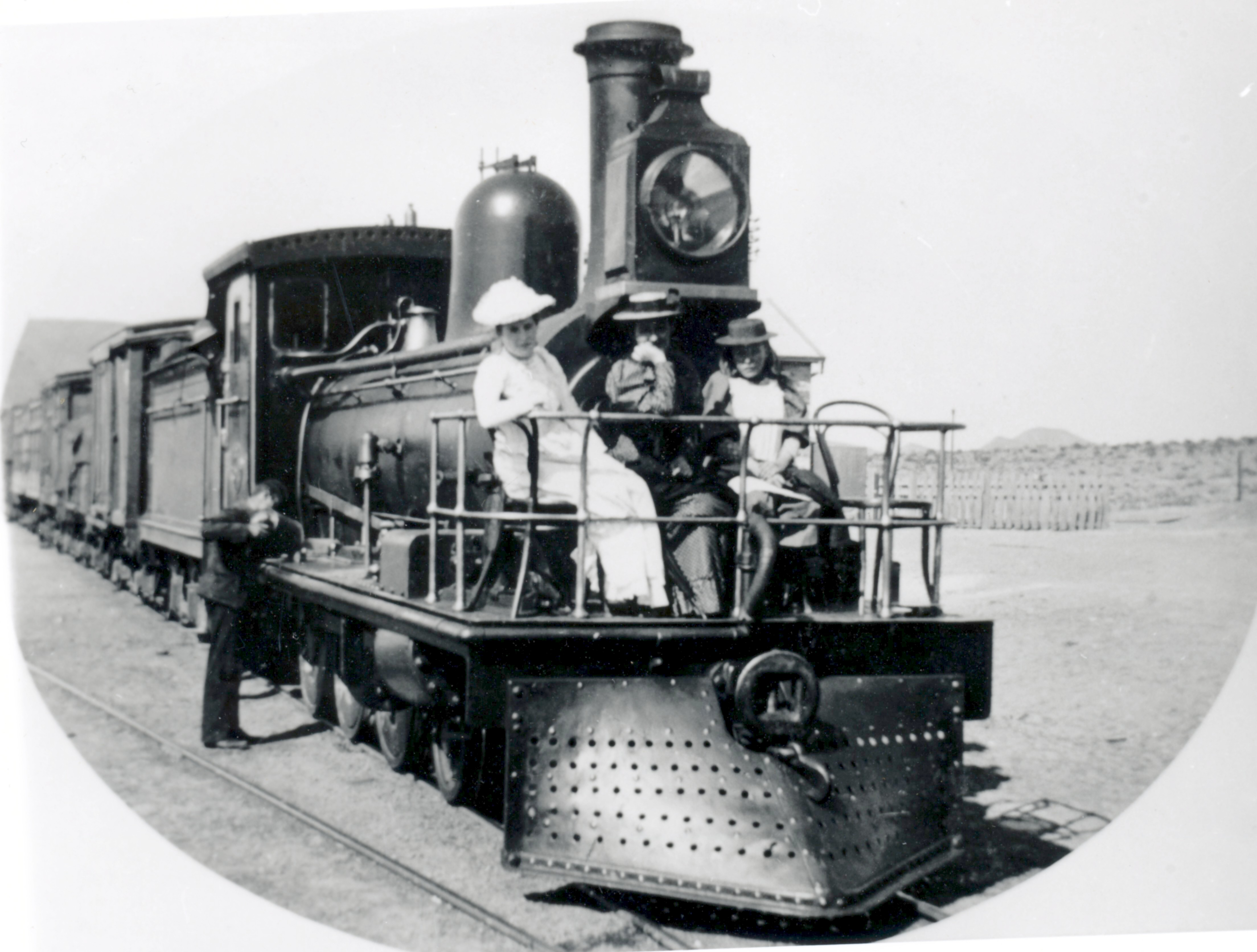
Converted Joy still with its front porch

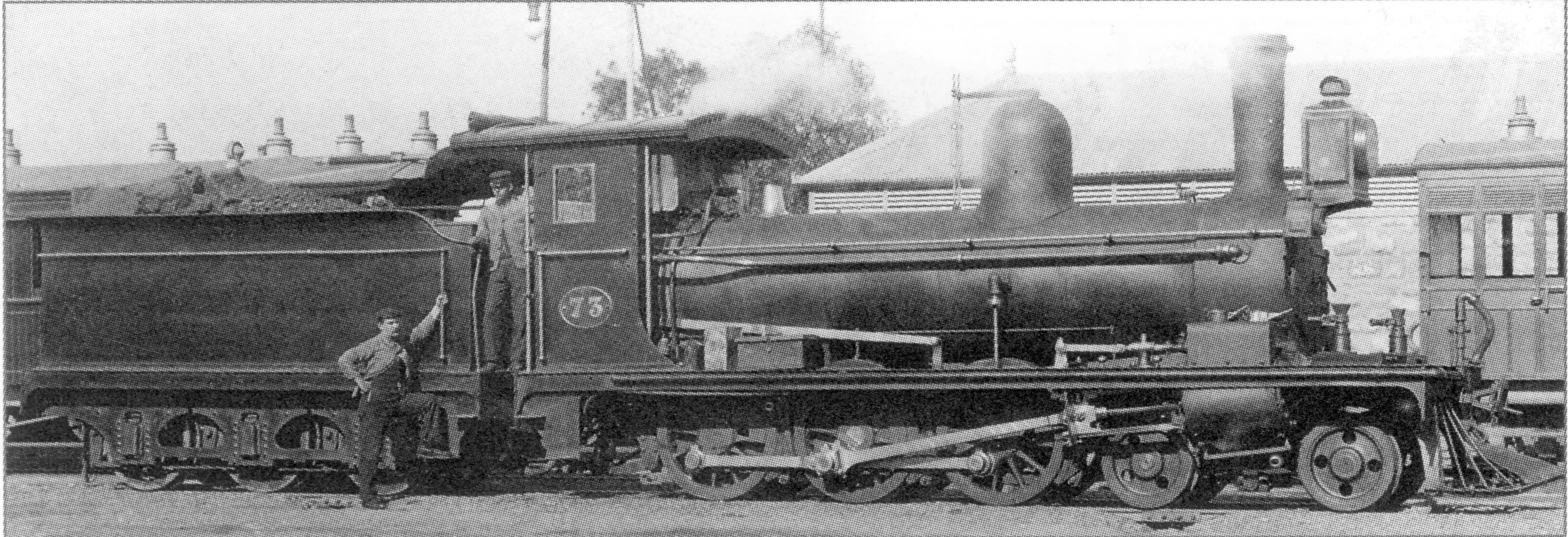
No. 73 with short smokebox and Salter safety valve, c. 1900

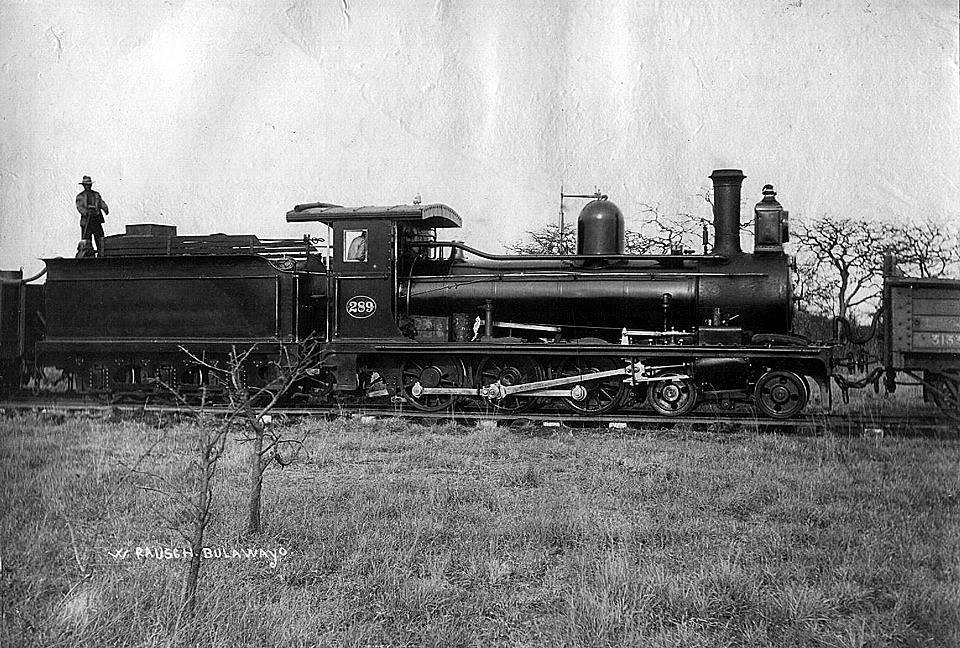
No. 289 with extended smokebox and Salter safety valve, c. 1897

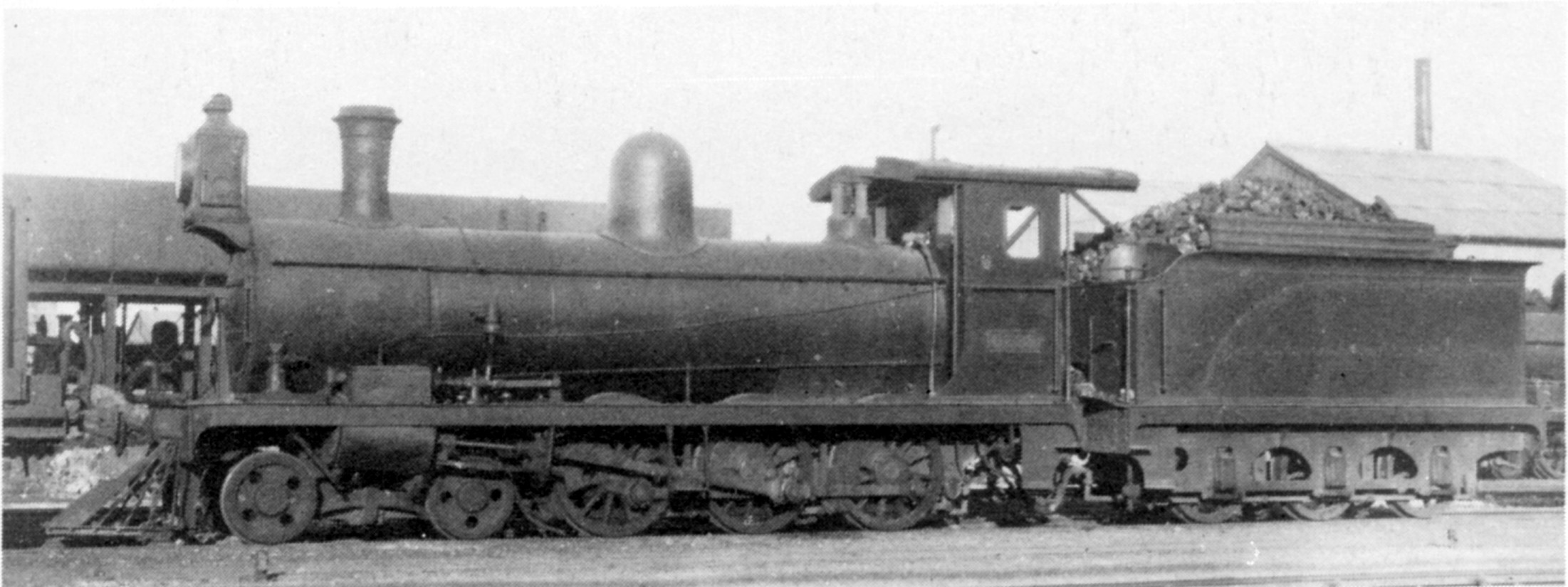
Reboilered OVGS 4th Class G with Tilney’s extended smokebox and Ramsbottom safety valves, c. 1897
