= CGR 4th Class 4-6-0TT 1882 =

1882 design of South African steam locomotive

CGR 4th Class 4-6-0TT 1882 Kowie 4th Class 4-6-0TT 1882 South African Class 04 4-6-0TT 1882
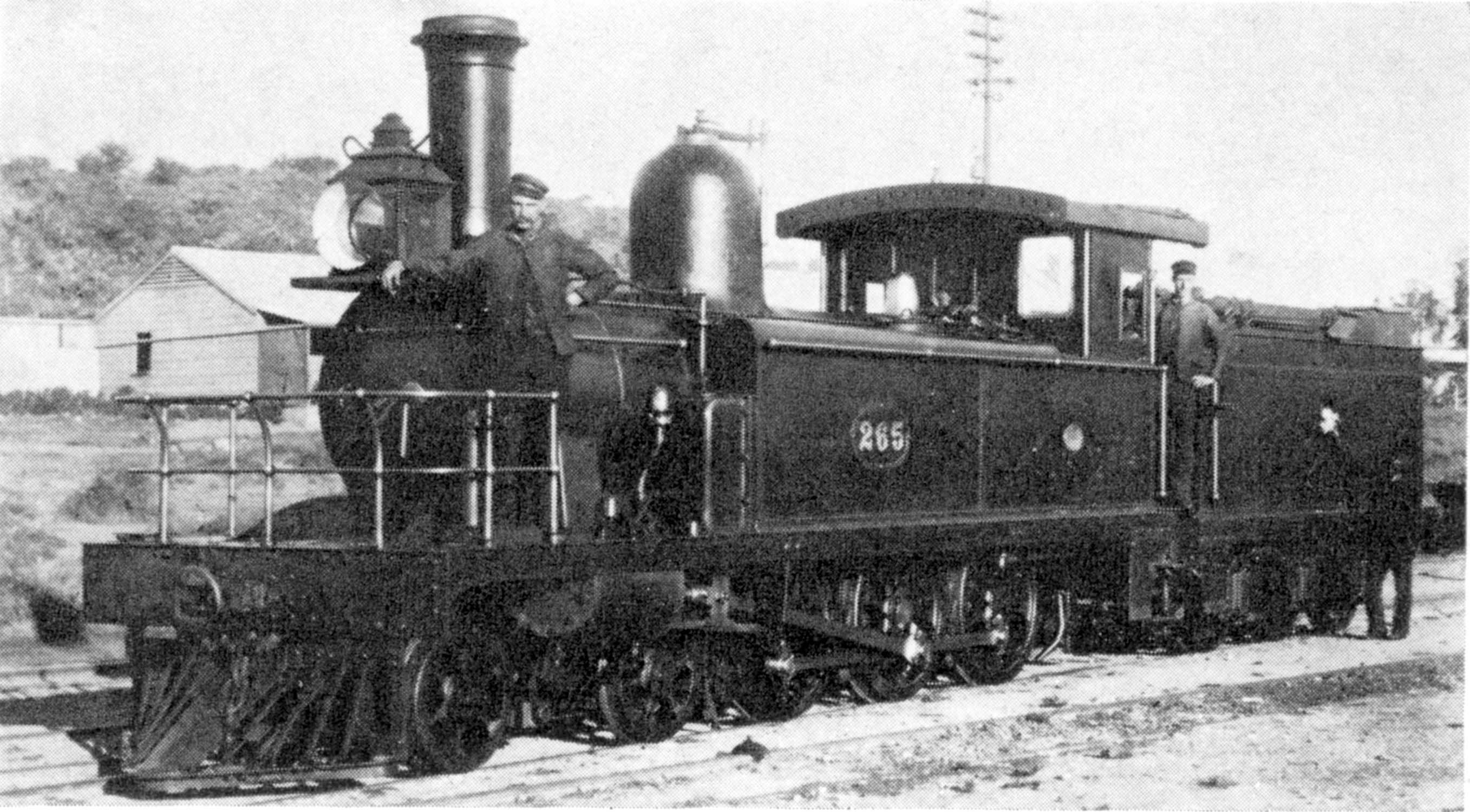
- 4th Class 4-6-0TT no. 265 at Cradock, c. 1890
Type and origin
- Power type: Steam
- Designer: Cape Government Railways (Michael Stephens)
- Builder: Robert Stephenson and Company
- Serial number: 2451–2483
- Build date: 1882–1883
- Total produced: 33
Specifications
- Configuration
  - Whyte: 4-6-0TT (Ten-wheeler)
  - UIC: 2'Cn2t
- Driver: 2nd coupled axle
- Gauge: 3 ft 6 in (1,067 mm) Cape gauge
- Leading dia.: 27 1/2 in (698 mm)
- Coupled dia.: 42 in (1,067 mm)
- Tender wheels: 36 1/2 in (927 mm)
- Wheelbase: 35 ft 3/8 in (10,678 mm)
  - Engine: 16 ft 10 in (5,131 mm)
  - Leading: 5 ft (1,524 mm)
  - Coupled: 8 ft (2,438 mm)
  - Tender: 8 ft (2,438 mm)
- Length
  - Over couplers: 43 ft 2 3/8 in (13,167 mm)
- Height: 12 ft (3,658 mm)
- Axle load: 7 LT 16 cwt (7,925 kg)
  - Leading: 8 LT 16 cwt (8,941 kg)
  - 1st coupled: 5 LT 17 cwt (5,944 kg)
  - 2nd coupled: 7 LT 9 cwt (7,570 kg)
  - 3rd coupled: 7 LT 16 cwt (7,925 kg)
- Adhesive weight: 21 LT 2 cwt (21,440 kg)
- Loco weight: 29 LT 18 cwt (30,380 kg)
- Tender weight: 19 LT (19,300 kg)
- Total weight: 48 LT 18 cwt (49,680 kg)
- Tender type: 3-axle
- Fuel type: Coal
- Fuel capacity: 3 LT (3.0 t)
- Water cap.: 600 imp gal (2,730 L) engine 1,700 imp gal (7,730 L) tender
- Firebox
  - Type: Round-top
  - Grate area: 11.7 sq ft (1.09 m^{2})
- Boiler
  - Pitch: 5 ft 9 in (1,753 mm)
  - Diameter: 3 ft 6 3/8 in (1,076 mm)
  - Tube plates: 10 ft 4 1/2 in (3,162 mm)
- Boiler pressure: 140 psi (965 kPa)
- Safety valve: Salter
- Heating surface
  - Firebox: 61.6 sq ft (5.72 m^{2})
  - Tubes: 690 sq ft (64 m^{2})
  - Total surface: 751.6 sq ft (69.83 m^{2})
- Cylinders: Two
- Cylinder size: 15 in (381 mm) bore 20 in (508 mm) stroke
- Valve gear: Stephenson
- Couplers: Johnston link-and-pin
Performance figures
- Tractive effort: 11,250 lbf (50.0 kN) @ 75%
Career
- Operators: Cape Government Railways; Kowie Railway; South African Railways
- Class: CGR 4th Class, SAR Class 04
- Number in class: 33
- Numbers: W47-W55, M58-M75, M84-M85, E35-E38
- Delivered: 1882–1883
- First run: 1882
- Withdrawn: c. 1932

The Cape Government Railways 4th Class 4-6-0TT of 1882 was a South African steam locomotive from the pre-Union era in the Cape of Good Hope.

In 1882 and 1883, the Cape Government Railways placed sixty-eight 4th Class 4-6-0 tank-and-tender locomotives in mainline service on all three its Systems. It was an improved version of the 4th Class locomotives of 1880 and 1881 and was delivered in two versions, built by two manufacturers.

Thirty-three of these locomotives were built by Robert Stephenson and Company, with Stephenson valve gear. Twelve of them were still in service when the South African Railways was established in 1912, including three which had been sold to the Kowie Railway.

== Manufacturers ==
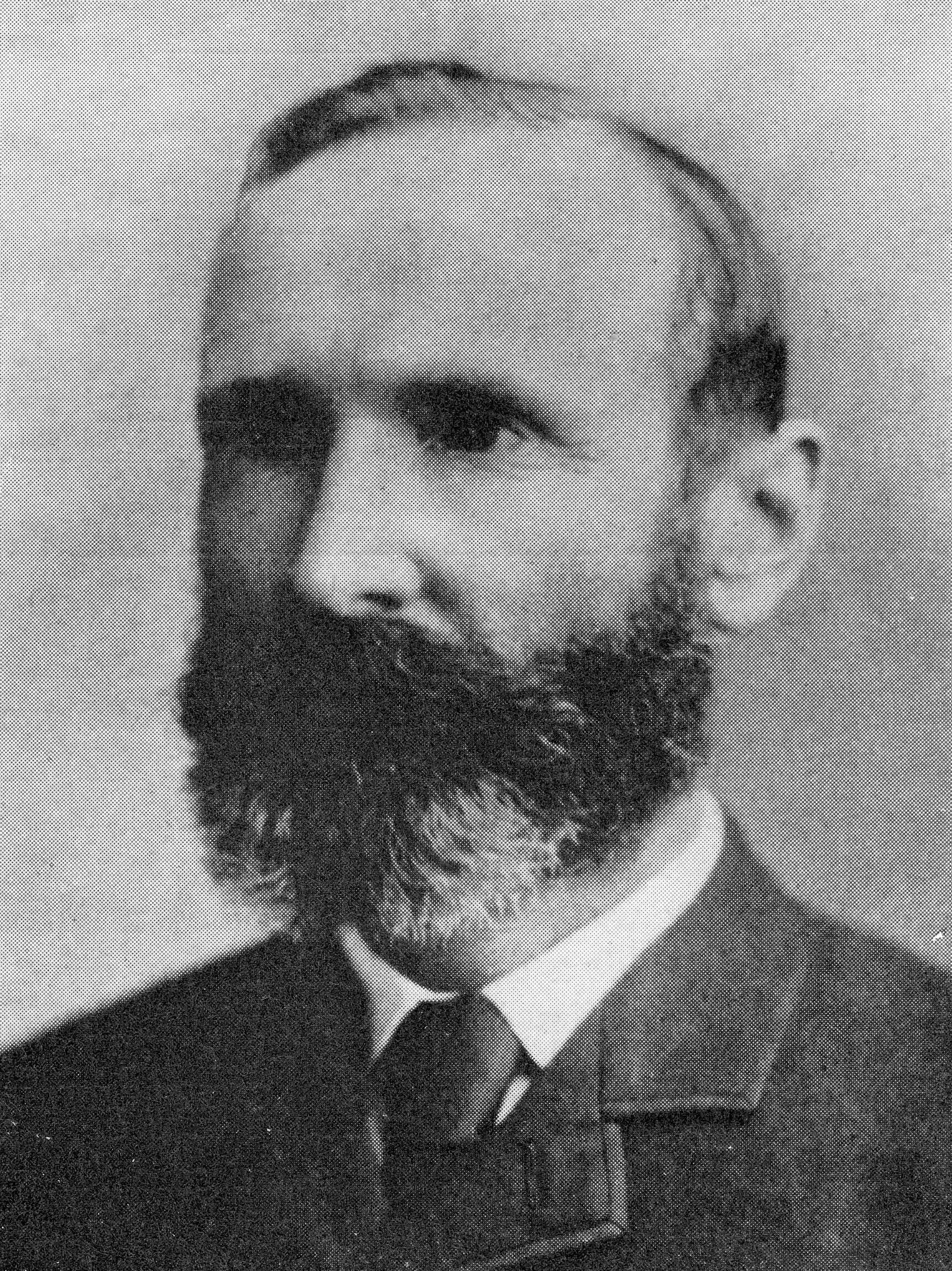
Michael Stephens

The 4th Class 4-6-0TT tank-and-tender locomotive of 1880 had been designed by Michael Stephens, at that stage the Locomotive Superintendent of the Western System of the Cape Government Railways (CGR) in Cape Town. This improved version was delivered to the CGR in 1882 and 1883. The contracts for their construction were divided between Robert Stephenson and Company and Neilson and Company. Neilson's built thirty-five locomotives with Joy valve gear.

Thirty-three were built by Stephenson's, with Stephenson valve gear. Of these, nine locomotives went to the Western System, operating out of Cape Town, and were numbered in the range from W47 to W55. Twenty went to the Midland System, operating out of Port Elizabeth, and were numbered in the range from M58 to M75, M84 and M85. Four went to the Eastern System, operating out of East London, and were numbered in the range from E35 to E38.

== Characteristics ==
All these locomotives had 42-inch (1,067-millimetre) diameter coupled wheels, unlike the six 4th Class locomotives which had been delivered to the Eastern System in 1880 and 1881, which had smaller 38-inch (965-millimetre) diameter coupled wheels. These 33 locomotives were delivered with Stephenson valve gear, like their predecessors of 1880 and 1881.

Since these locomotives were delivered with permanently coupled tenders, their cabs did not need side entrances with double handrails, like their predecessors of 1880 and 1881 did with their optional tenders. Access was by pairs of steps, mounted on the engine as well as on the tender, with one handrail attached to the engine and the other to the tender.

== Modifications ==
On the Eastern System, problems were experienced with the low-grade local coal from the Cyphergat and Molteno collieries in the Stormberg. It had a high content of non-combustible material which often caused delays, since it required frequent stops to allow the stoker to clear the grate of clinker and ash, a tedious task which required the locomotive to be stationary.

John D. Tilney, the Eastern System Locomotive Superintendent, carried out many experiments in an attempt to overcome the coal problem. Some of these involved modifying some of the 4th Class locomotives in order to install oscillating firebars and larger fireboxes.

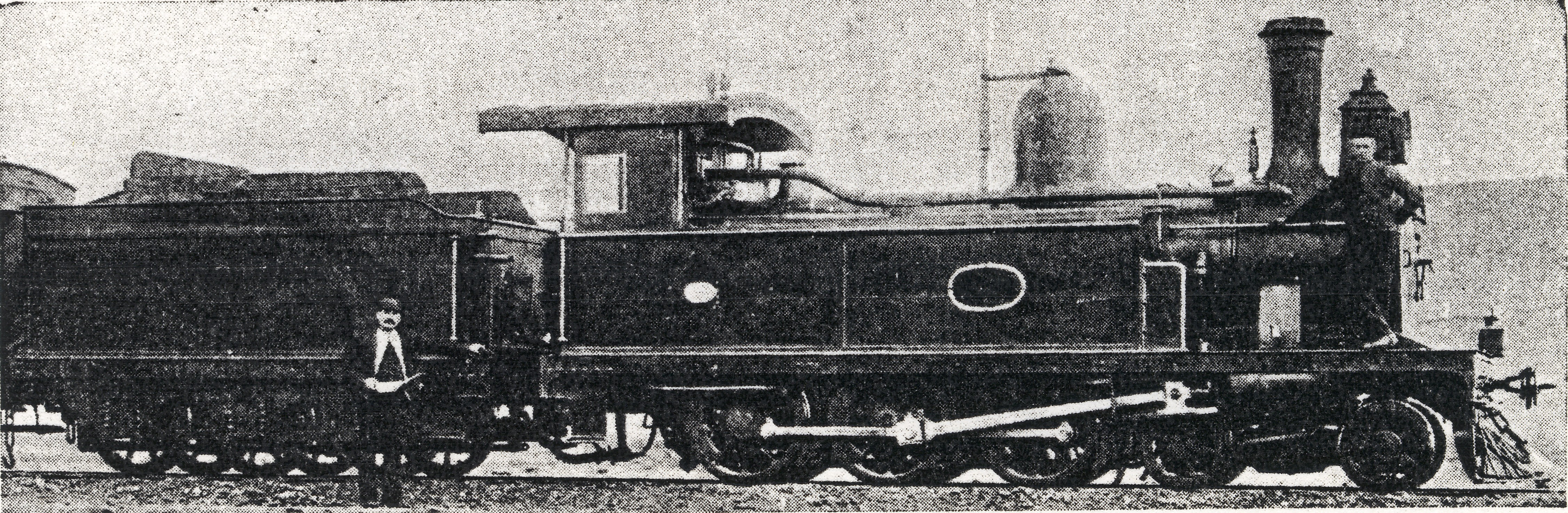
Tilney's extended smokebox

Another modification by Tilney was an extended smokebox, to make room for a very efficient spark arrester which was constructed of wire mesh. Several locomotives were altered to incorporate these spark arresters, as shown in the photograph alongside of a locomotive with an extended smokebox.

Tilney's initiatives did not pass unnoticed. In 1881, the General Manager appointed Hawthorne R. Thornton as Chief Locomotive Superintendent for the whole of the Cape of Good Hope, in response to the "growing tendency on the part of the several Locomotive Superintendents to bring in modifications of designs in essential parts of the engines and rolling stock".

After Michael Stephens retired and H.M. Beatty took over as Chief Locomotive Superintendent of the CGR in 1896, two of the locomotives were converted to regular tender engines by removing their side-tanks.

== Service ==
=== Cape Government Railways ===
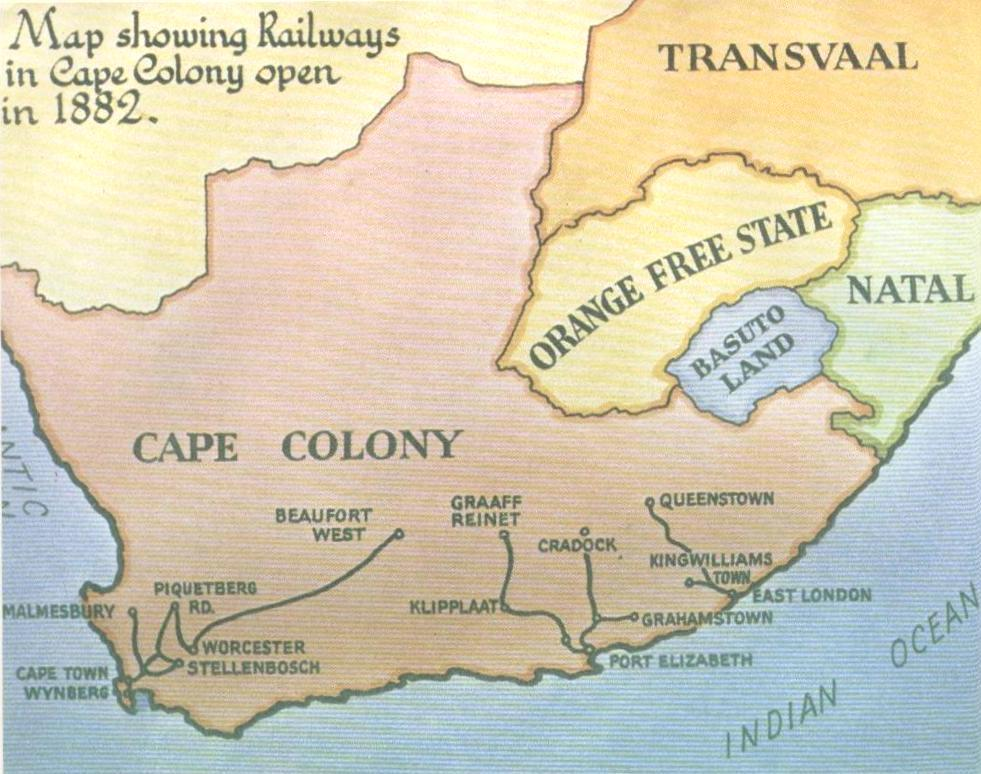

At the time these 4th Class locomotives entered service, the two Eastern System mainlines were open to King William's Town and approaching Sterkstroom respectively. Those of the Midland System were completed to Graaff Reinet and approaching Cradock respectively, while the Western System mainline was open to Beaufort West.

All these locomotives were renumbered more than once during their service lives on the CGR. By 1886, the system prefixes had been done away with and the Midland System's locomotives had all been renumbered by replacing the letter prefix "M" with the numeral "1". The Western System locomotives were allocated new numbers in the 100 range. By 1888, the Eastern System locomotives had been renumbered into the 600 number range. The Midland System locomotives were renumbered twice more, into the 200 number range by 1890 and into the 400 number range by 1899. All these renumberings are listed in the table below.

=== Kowie Railway ===
At some stage after 1904, three of these locomotives, numbers 470, 471 and 477, were sold to the Kowie Railway Company, which operated a line between Port Alfred and Grahamstown. They were renumbered 1, 3 and 2 respectively.

=== South African Railways ===
When the Union of South Africa was established on 31 May 1910, the three Colonial government railways (CGR, Natal Government Railways and Central South African Railways) were united under a single administration to control and administer the railways, ports and harbours of the Union. Although the South African Railways and Harbours came into existence in 1910, the actual classification and renumbering of all the rolling stock of the three constituent railways was only implemented with effect from 1 January 1912.

By 1912, nine locomotives survived. They were considered obsolete by the South African Railways, designated Class 04 and renumbered by having the numeral "0" prefixed to their existing numbers. Despite being considered obsolete, some of them were still being employed as shunting locomotives in Port Elizabeth in 1932. The rest had been scrapped by 1918.

== Works numbers ==
The works numbers, years built, original numbers, renumbering and disposal of the Cape 4th Class of 1882 are listed in the table.

CGR 4th Class 4-6-0TT of 1882 (Stephenson)
Works no.	Year blt.	Orig. no.	1886 no.	1888 no.	1890 no.	1896 no.	1899 no.	1904 no.	SAR no.	Sold to
2472	1882	E35	35	627	627	627	627	627		
2473	1882	E36	36	628	628	628	628	628		
2474	1882	E37	37	629	629	629	629	629	0629	
2475	1882	E38	38	630	630	630	630	630	0630	
2461	1882	M58	158	158	258	458	458	458	0458	
2462	1882	M59	159	159	259	459	459	459	0459	
2463	1882	M60	160	160	260	460	460	460		
2464	1882	M61	161	161	261	461	461	461	0461	
2465	1882	M62	162	162	262	462	462	462		
2466	1882	M63	163	163	263	463	463	463		
2467	1882	M64	164	164	264	464	464	464		
2468	1882	M65	165	165	265	465	465	465		
2469	1882	M66	166	166	266	466	466	466		
2470	1882	M67	167	167	267	467	467	467		
2476	1882	M68	168	168	268	468	468	468		
2477	1882	M69	169	169	269	469	469	469		
2478	1882	M70	170	170	270	470	470	470	1	Kowie
2479	1882	M71	171	171	271	471	471	471	3	Kowie
2480	1882	M72	172	172	272	472	472	472		
2451	1882	W47	176	176	276	476	476			
2452	1882	W48	177	177	277	477	477	477	2	Kowie
2453	1882	W49	178	178	278	478	478	478		
2454	1882	W50	179	179	279	479	479	479		
2455	1882	W51	180	180	280	480	480			
2456	1882	W52	181	181	281	481	481	481	0481	
2457	1882	W53	182	182	282	482	482			
2458	1882	W54	183	183	283	483	483	483	0483	
2459	1882	W55	184	184	284	484	484	484		
2481	1883	M73	173	173	273	473	473	473		
2482	1883	M74	174	174	274	474	474	474	0474	
2483	1883	M75	175	175	275	475	475	475	0475	
2460	1883	M84								
2471	1883	M85	185	185	285	485	485	485		
