= CGR 4th Class 4-6-0TT 1880 =

Class of South African 4-6-0TT locomotives

CGR 4th Class 4-6-0TT 1880 South African Class 04 4-6-0TT 1880
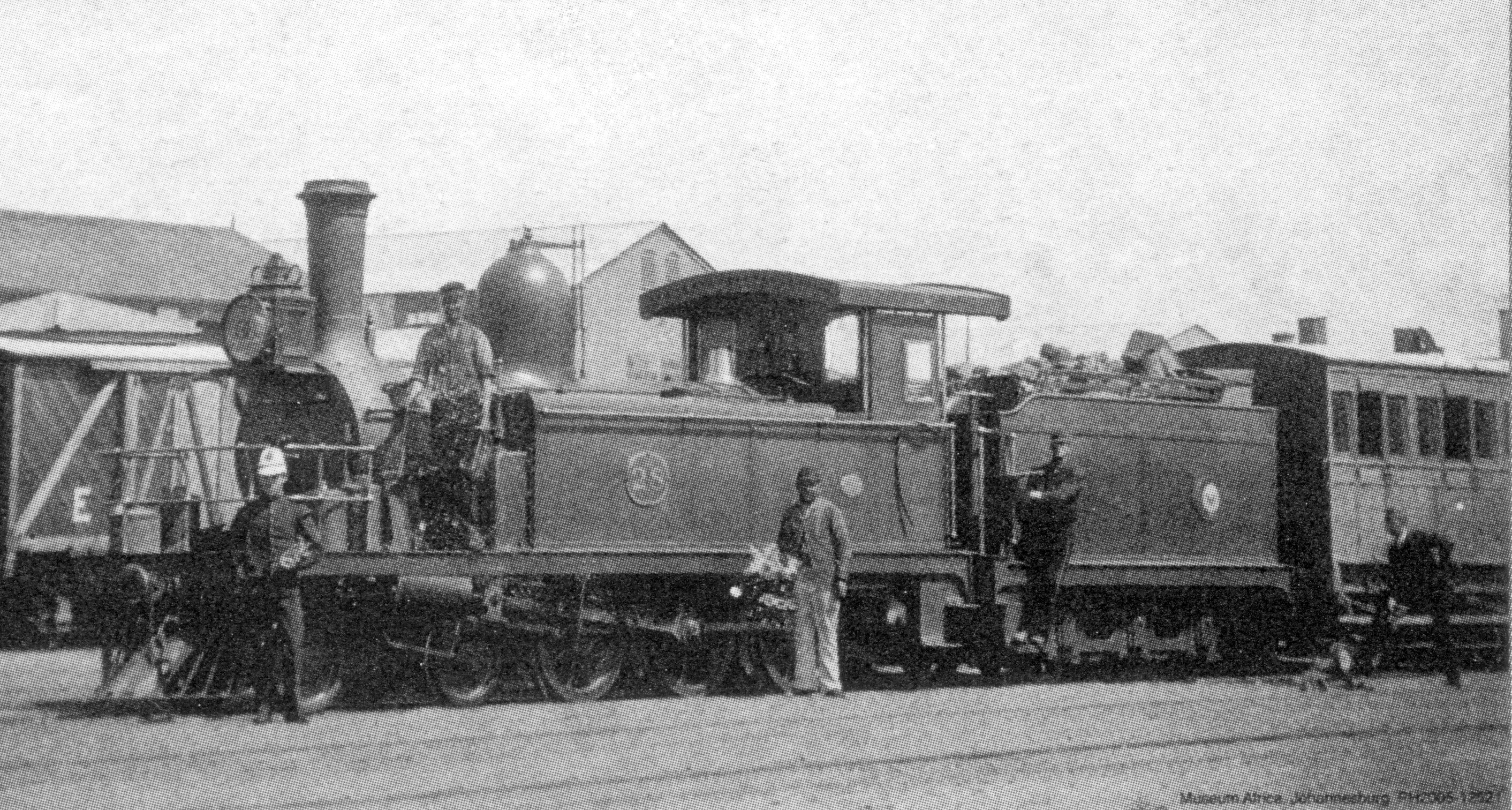
- No. E29 on a passenger train, c. 1886
Type and origin
- Power type: Steam
- Designer: Cape Government Railways (Michael Stephens)
- Builder: Robert Stephenson and Company
- Serial number: 2361-2366, 2385-2390, 2431-2436
- Build date: 1879-1880
- Total produced: 18
Specifications
- Configuration
  - Whyte: 4-6-0TT (Tenwheeler)
  - UIC: 2'Cn2t
- Driver: 2nd coupled axle
- Gauge: 3 ft 6 in (1,067 mm) Cape gauge
- Leading dia.: 27 1/2 in (698 mm)
- Coupled dia.: Eastern: 38 in (965 mm); Midland: 42 in (1,067 mm)
- Tender wheels: 36 in (914 mm)
- Wheelbase: 35 ft 2 7/8 in (10,741 mm)
  - Engine: 17 ft (5,182 mm)
  - Leading: 5 ft (1,524 mm)
  - Coupled: 8 ft (2,438 mm)
  - Tender: 8 ft (2,438 mm)
- Length
  - Over couplers: 43 ft 4 7/8 in (13,230 mm)
- Height: Eastern: 12 ft 1 in (3,683 mm); Midland: 12 ft (3,658 mm)
- Axle load: 8 LT 14 cwt (8,840 kg)
  - Leading: 8 LT 16 cwt (8,941 kg)
  - 1st coupled: 7 LT 13 cwt (7,773 kg)
  - 2nd coupled: 8 LT 14 cwt (8,840 kg)
  - 3rd coupled: 7 LT 11 cwt (7,671 kg)
  - Tender axle: Axle 1: 8 LT 14 cwt (8,840 kg); Axle 2: 6 LT 17 cwt (6,960 kg); Axle 3: 7 LT 11 cwt (7,671 kg)
- Adhesive weight: 23 LT 18 cwt (24,280 kg)
- Loco weight: 32 LT 14 cwt (33,220 kg)
- Tender weight: 23 LT 2 cwt (23,470 kg)
- Total weight: 55 LT 16 cwt (56,700 kg)
- Tender type: 3-axle
- Fuel type: Coal
- Fuel capacity: 6 LT (6.1 t)
- Water cap.: 600 imp gal (2,730 L) engine
- Tender cap.: 1,675 imp gal (7,610 L)
- Firebox
  - Type: Round-top
  - Grate area: Regular: 11.7 sq ft (1.09 m^{2}); Tilney: 10.9 sq ft (1.01 m^{2})
- Boiler
  - Pitch: Eastern: 5 ft 9 in (1,753 mm); Midland: 5 ft 11 in (1,803 mm)
  - Diameter: 3 ft 6 in (1,067 mm) inside 4 ft 2 in (1,270 mm) outside
  - Tube plates: 10 ft 1 in (3,073 mm)
  - Small tubes: 145: 1 3/4 in (44 mm)
- Boiler pressure: 140 psi (965 kPa)
- Safety valve: Salter
- Heating surface
  - Firebox: 65 sq ft (6.0 m^{2})
  - Tubes: 688 sq ft (63.9 m^{2})
  - Total surface: 753 sq ft (70.0 m^{2})
- Cylinders: Two
- Cylinder size: 15 in (381 mm) bore 20 in (508 mm) stroke
- Valve gear: Stephenson
- Couplers: Johnston link-and-pin
Performance figures
- Tractive effort: 11,250 lbf (50.0 kN) @ 75%
Career
- Operators: Cape Government Railways; South African Railways
- Class: CGR 4th Class, SAR Class 04
- Number in class: 18
- Numbers: M34-M39, M50-M55, E27-E32
- Delivered: 1880-1881
- First run: 1880

The Cape Government Railways 4th Class 4-6-0TT of 1880 was a South African steam locomotive from the pre-Union era in the Cape of Good Hope.

In 1880 and 1881, the Cape Government Railways placed eighteen 4th Class 4-6-0 tank-and-tender locomotives in mainline service on its Midland and Eastern Systems, working out of Port Elizabeth and East London respectively. It was the first South African locomotive to be built to a local design. Four of these locomotives were still in service to come onto the South African Railways roster in 1912.

== Manufacturer ==
Increasing traffic and heavier loads on the Cape Government Railways (CGR) lines into the interior from Port Elizabeth on the Midland System and East London on the Eastern System, led to a requirement for larger and more powerful locomotives by the late 1870s.

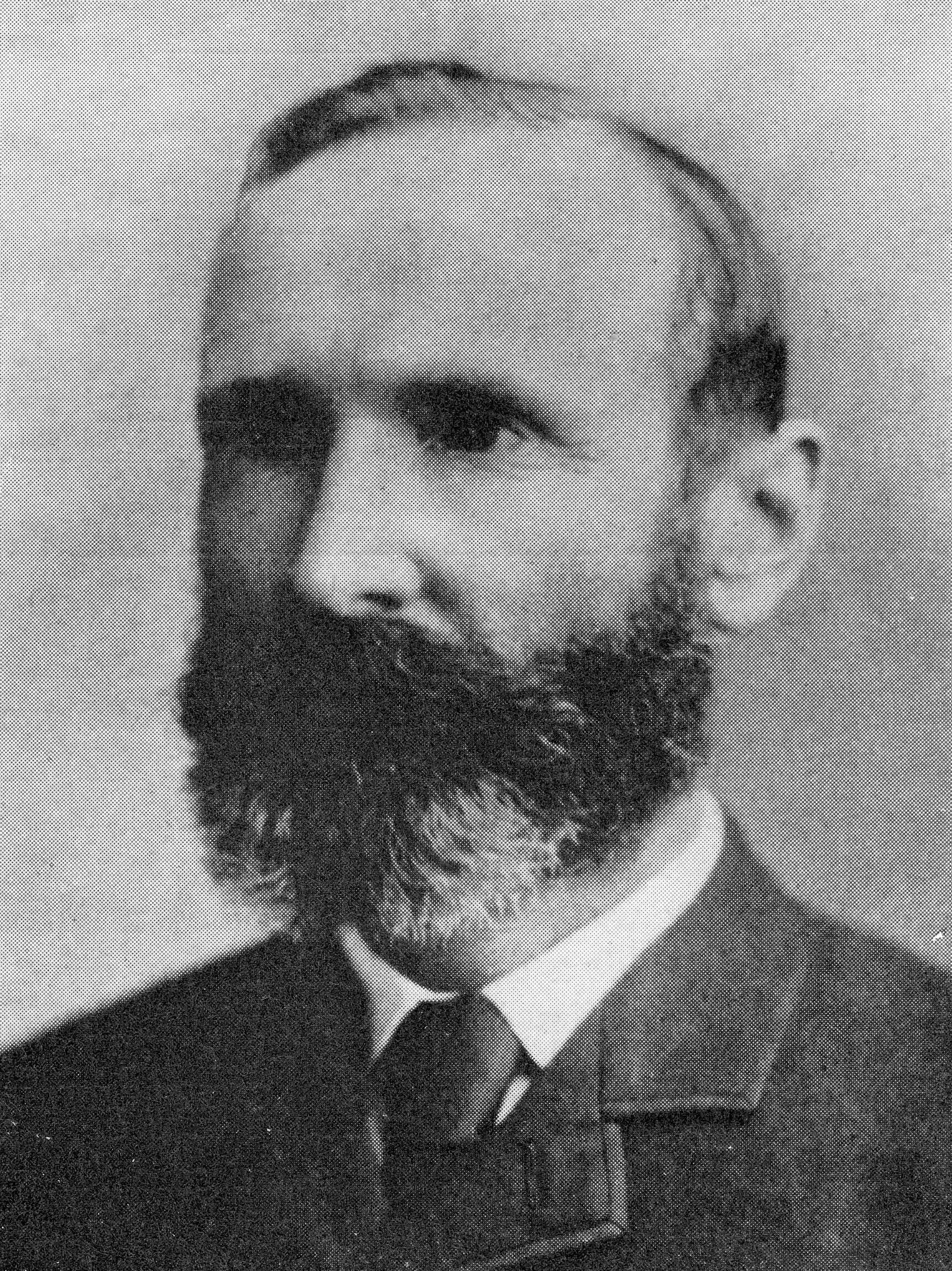
Michael Stephens

The 4th Class 4-6-0 tank-and-tender locomotive was designed by Michael Stephens, at that stage the Locomotive Superintendent of the Western System in Cape Town, and six locomotives were ordered from Robert Stephenson and Company in 1879. This was the first South African locomotive to be built to a local design, prepared in the CGR drawing office in Salt River. These were delivered to the Midland System in 1880, numbered in the range from M34 to M39.

They were followed by two more batches of six from the same manufacturer. The second batch was delivered to the Eastern System in 1880 and 1881, numbered in the range from E27 to E32, and the last batch to the Midland System in 1881, numbered in the range from M50 to M55.

== Characteristics ==
These locomotives, which used Stephenson valve gear, were intended for freight work. The locomotives delivered to the Midland System had coupled wheels of 42 inches (1,067 millimetres) diameter, while those delivered to the Eastern System where grades were much more severe, had coupled wheels of 38 inches (965 millimetres) diameter.

All the locomotives were delivered with optional three-axle tenders and, depending on the task at hand and the distance involved, could be used in either the tank engine or the tank-and-tender configuration. To facilitate easy uncoupling from the tender and direct coupling to rolling stock while working as a tank engine, the engine-to-tender couplings were Johnston link-and-pin couplers instead of the more usual drawbar. Each side of the cab was equipped with a side entrance and double handrails to allow easy access or egress to the crew while working without a tender.

These locomotives were the first in South Africa to be equipped with compensated spring gear on all coupled wheels. Their coupling rods extended from crank-pin to crank-pin, with no knuckle joints. The 5 feet (1,524 millimetres) wheelbase bogie had a lateral traverse of 1 1/4 inches (32 millimetres) to each side, which was restrained by two cylindrically shaped rubber cushion pads, each 5 5/8 inches (143 millimetres) in diameter and 5 inches (127 millimetres) deep. Two inverted laminated springs carried the vertical load.

Since the engine did not have a coal bunker, photographs of a locomotive working in the tank engine configuration will sometimes show the engine with a bag of coal slung onto the side tanks or stowed on the running boards. These locomotives retained their side-tanks throughout their working lives.

== Modifications ==
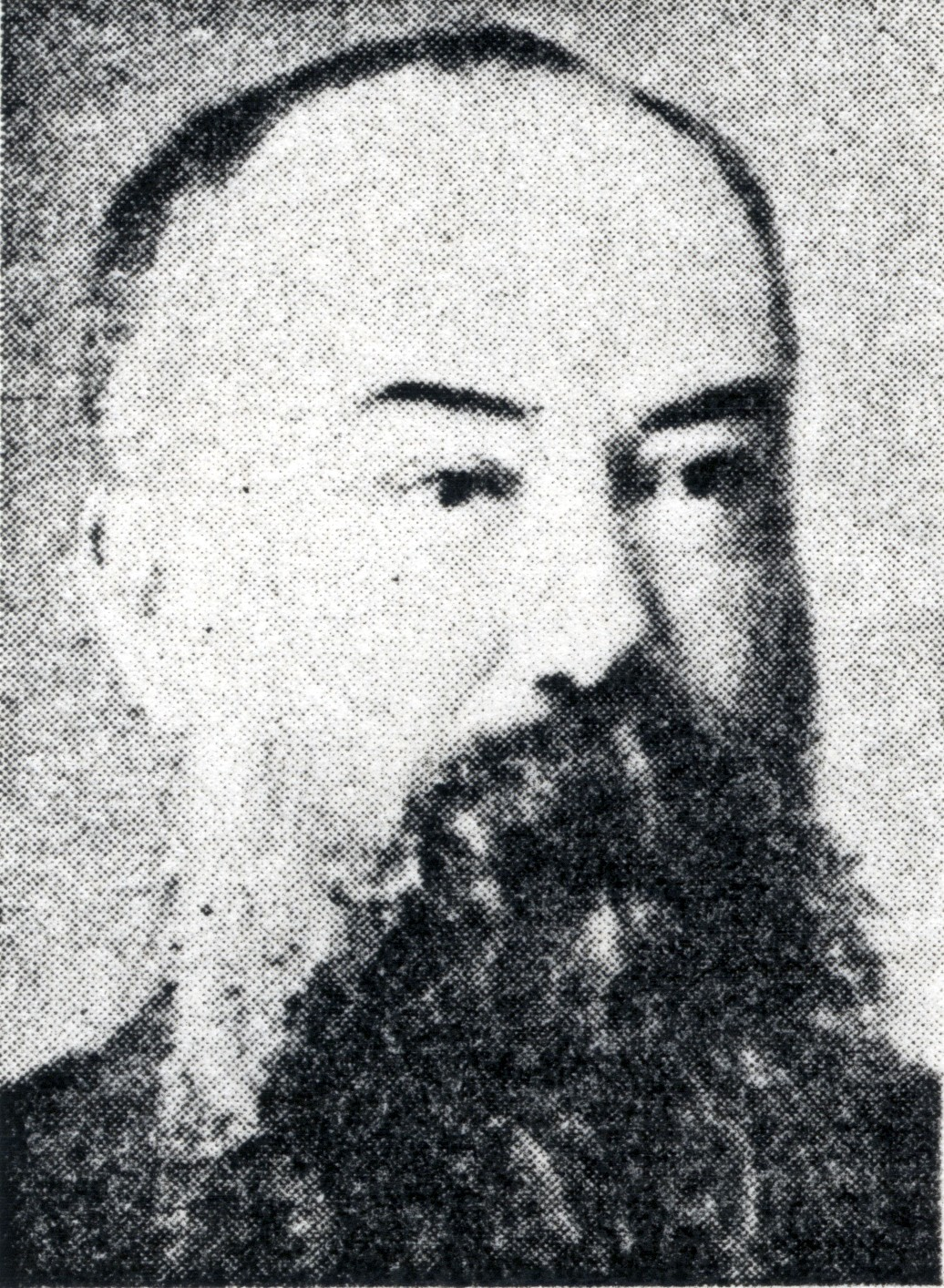
J.D. Tilney

J.D. Tilney, the Eastern System's Locomotive Superintendent, carried out several experiments on some of these 4th Class locomotives. One of the modifications introduced by Tilney was an extended smokebox to make room for a very efficient spark arrester, constructed of wire mesh. In 1882, he reported that grass fires caused by locomotives had been rarely known since the spark-arresters were installed. Several locomotives on the Eastern and Midland Systems were altered to incorporate these spark arresters.

Another modification involved modifying the boiler and frame to accommodate oscillating firebars and a larger firebox to overcome the problems associated with the low-grade local coal from the Cyphergat collieries. Mechanical firegrate shaking was accomplished by means of a collar on the leading coupled axle which could be engaged by a roller with eccentrically mounted connecting rods to the oscillating firebars. The drawings to illustrate the operation of the oscillating firebars were published in Mechanical Engineers in 1890.

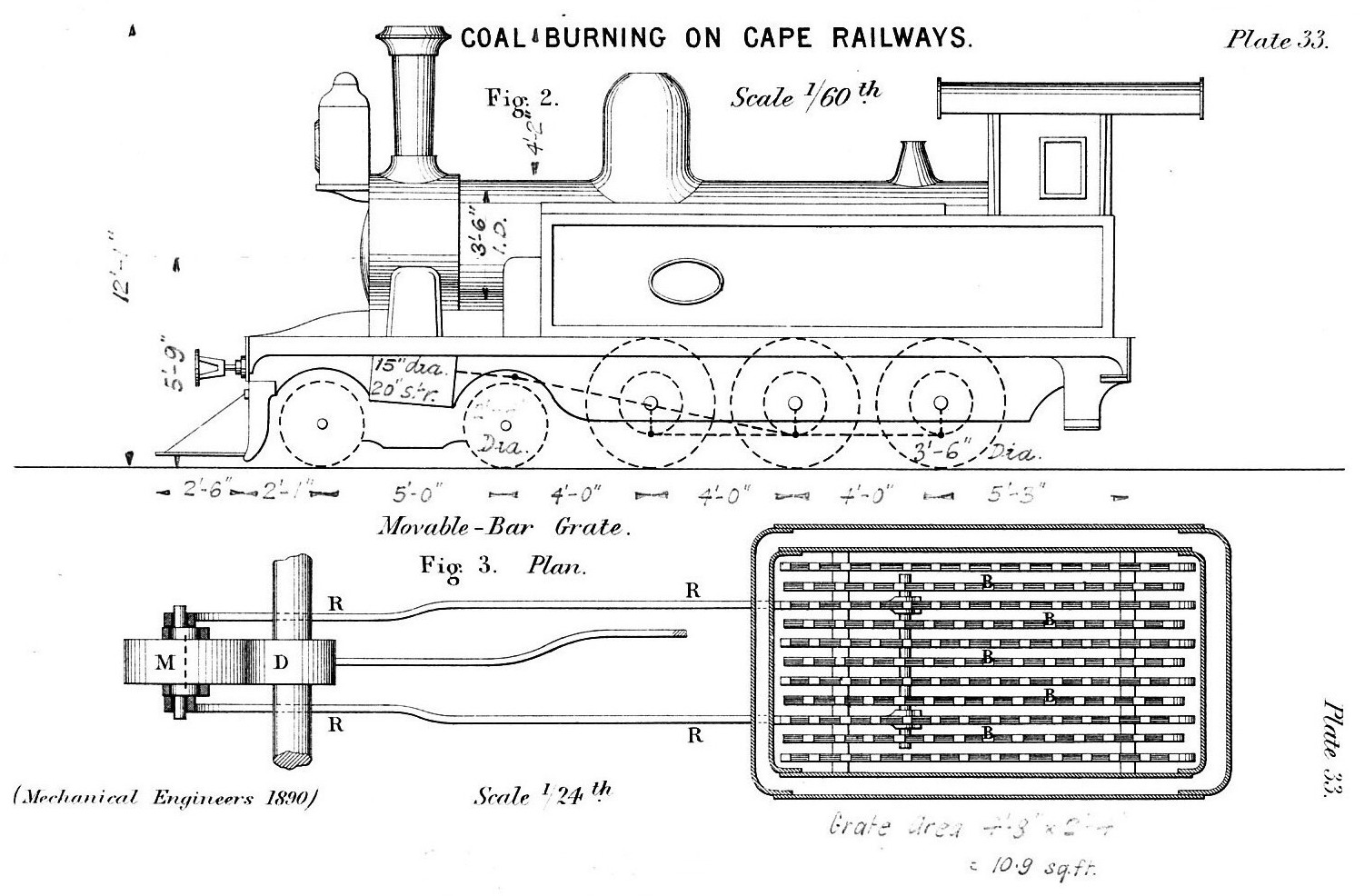

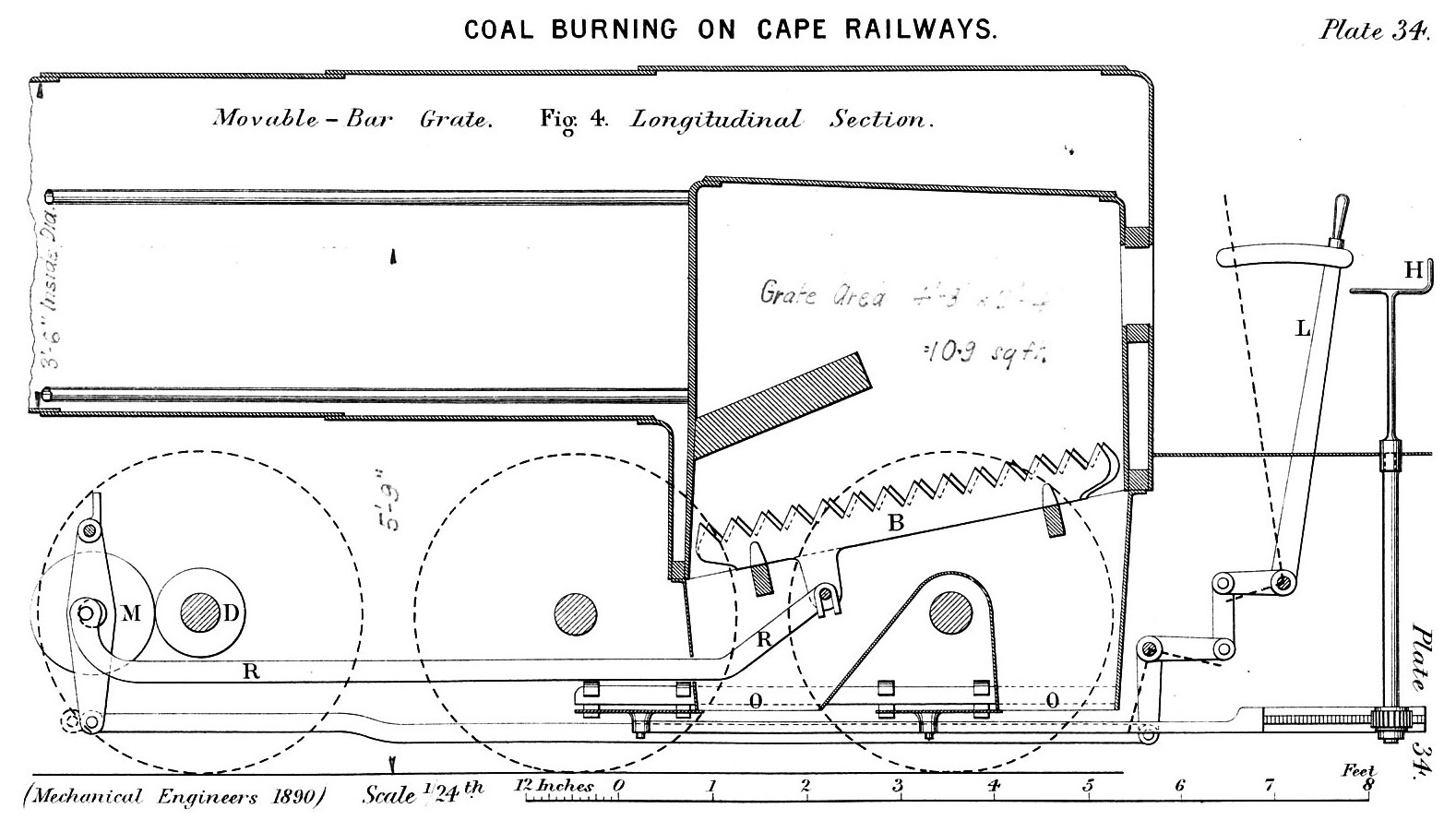

== Service ==
=== Cape Government Railways ===
At the time the 4th Class entered service, the Eastern System's lines were open to King William's Town and approaching Queenstown, with the latter being opened on 5 May 1880. The Midland System's lines were completed to Graaff Reinet and Cookhouse respectively.

During their service lives on the CGR, all these locomotives were renumbered more than once. By 1886, the system prefixes had been done away with and the Midland System's locomotives had all been renumbered by replacing the letter prefix "M" with the numeral "1". By 1888, the six Eastern System locomotives had been renumbered into the 600 number range. The Midland System locomotives were renumbered twice more, into the 200 number range by 1890 and into the 400 number range by 1899.

By 1899, the first batch of six locomotives of the Midland System was no longer reflected in the locomotive register. By 1904, all six of the Eastern System were gone from the register as well.

=== South African Railways ===
When the Union of South Africa was established on 31 May 1910, the three Colonial government railways (CGR, Natal Government Railways and Central South African Railways) were united under a single administration to control and administer the railways, ports and harbours of the Union. Although the South African Railways and Harbours came into existence in 1910, the actual classification and renumbering of all the rolling stock of the three constituent railways was only implemented with effect from 1 January 1912.

By 1912, four locomotives survived, numbers 451 to 454. They were considered obsolete by the SAR, designated Class 04 and renumbered by having the numeral "0" prefixed to their existing numbers.

== Works numbers ==
The works numbers, years built, original numbers and renumbering of the Cape 4th Class of 1880 are listed in the table.

CGR 4th Class 4-6-0TT of 1880
Works no.	Year blt.	Orig. no.	1886 no.	1888 no.	1890 no.	1899 no.	1904 no.	SAR no.
2361	1879	M34	134	134	234			
2362	1879	M35	135	135	235			
2363	1879	M36	136	136	236			
2364	1879	M37	137	137	237			
2365	1879	M38	138	138	238			
2366	1879	M39	139	139	239			
2385	1880	E27	27	645	645	645		
2386	1880	E28	28	646	646	646		
2387	1880	E29	29	647	647	647		
2388	1881	E30	30	648	648	648		
2389	1881	E31	31	649	649	649		
2390	1881	E32	32	650	650	650		
2431	1881	M50	150	150	250	450	450	
2432	1881	M51	151	151	251	451	451	0451
2433	1881	M52	152	152	252	452	452	0452
2434	1881	M53	153	153	253	453	453	0453
2435	1881	M54	154	154	254	454	454	0454
2436	1881	M55	155	155	255	455	455	

== Illustration ==
The photograph illustrates a modified locomotive with an extended smokebox, working without its tender. Note the coal bag on the side tank.

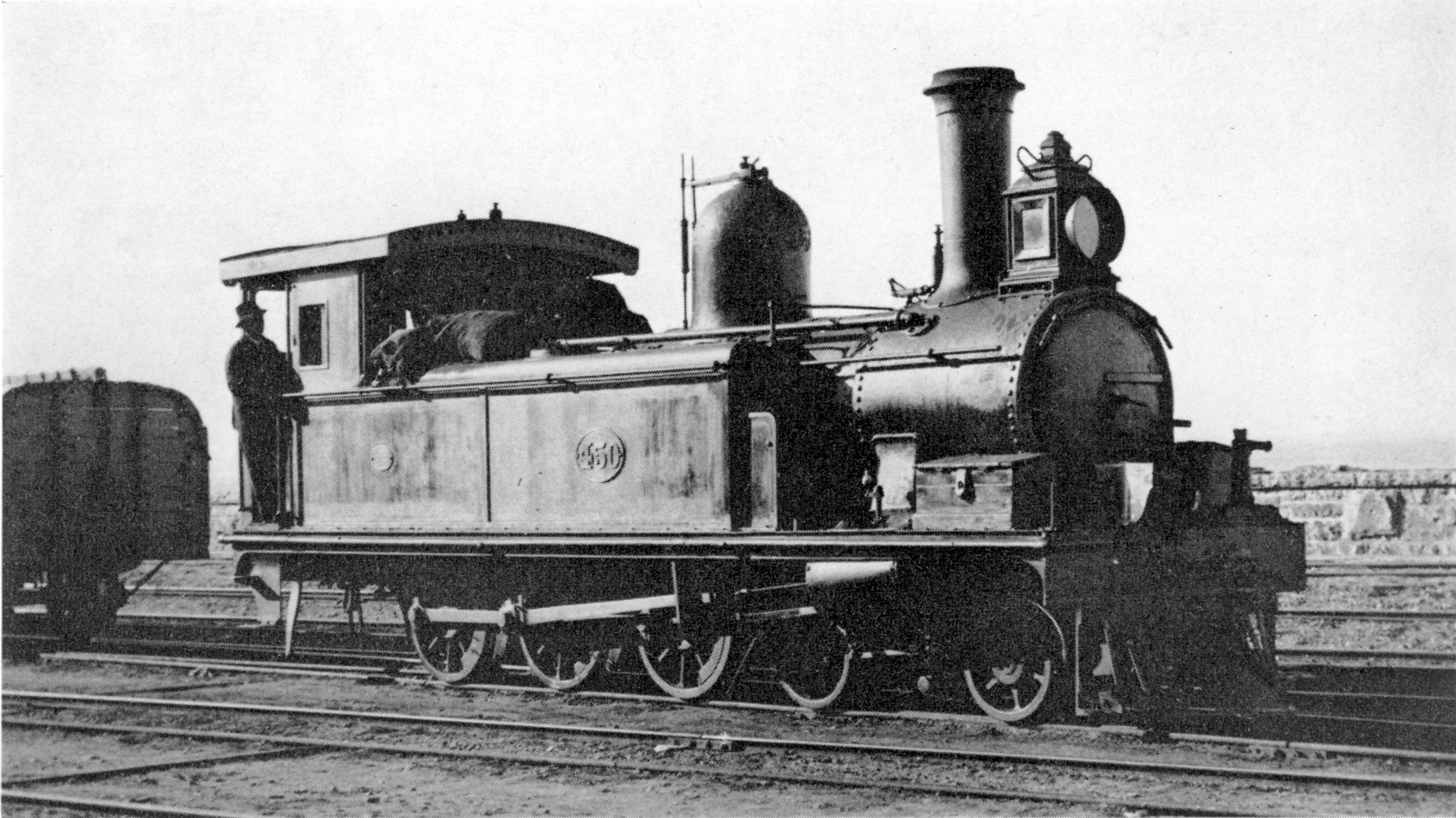
No. 450 (ex no. M50), Port Elizabeth, c. 1896
