= List of LMS locomotives as of 31 December 1947 =

The following is a list of locomotives of the London, Midland and Scottish Railway as of 31 December 1947. This date is significant because nationalisation of the Big Four occurred the next day, 1 January 1948. Thus this is the list of locomotives as inherited by British Railways. At this time there were approximately 8,000 steam locomotives, 50 diesel locomotives and a handful of others.

== Overview ==
In addition to its own builds, the LMS still owned locomotives inherited from various constituent companies: the Caledonian Railway (CR), Furness Railway (FR), Glasgow and South Western Railway (G&SWR), Highland Railway (HR), London and North Western Railway (LNWR), London, Tilbury and Southend Railway (LT&SR), Lancashire and Yorkshire Railway (L&YR), Midland Railway (MR), and North London Railway (NLR).

The most numerous class at this point was, if Midland and LMS classes are combined, the 4F (192 MR, 5 S&DJR, 575 LMS), and the second (or without combination) the "Black Five" with 742 locomotives, there were also 623 8Fs, including 67 LNER Class O6 on hire.

The LMS numbered self-propelled vehicles (diesel railcars, EMUs) into the coaching stock series, with the exception of the L&YR Railmotors.

BR allocated numbers in March 1948 (in the meantime there were a few withdrawals and new construction). Most ex-LMS engines had 40000 added to their numbers, but those with numbers over 20000 were renumbered in the 58xxx series to avoid the 6xxxx series used for ex-LNER locomotives. The ex-MR 2F 0-6-0s that had not been rebuilt as 3Fs were also renumbered into that series, as were the Midland 1P 0-4-4T. It then took a few years to renumber all the locomotives.

In terms of locomotive taxonomy, the LMS had a tendency to lump classes together (e.g. Sentinels, diesel shunters, ex-Midland 0-4-4Ts), but for clarity these have been split into subclasses where appropriate.

NB: This list is currently under construction. The power classification given is the LMS power classification. BR adopted the same system system-wide, but adapted it slightly.

Also, NCC engines and some departmental stock is missing.

== British locomotives ==
=== Main series ===
| Numbers | Class | No. in class | Years built | Wheel arrangement | Power classification | Notes | Picture |
|---|---|---|---|---|---|---|---|
| 1–70 | Fowler 2-6-2T | 70 | 1930–32 | 2-6-2T | 3P | | |
| 71–147, 149–162, 164–167, 204–209 | Stanier 2-6-2T | 135 | 1935–38 | 2-6-2T | 3P | 2 rebuilt in 1956 | |
| 148/63/68, 203 | Rebuilt Stanier 2-6-2T | 4 | (1941) | 2-6-2T | 3P | | |
| 322–326 | ex-SDJR Class 2P | 5 | 1914–21 | 4-4-0 | 2P | | |
| 332–562 (with gaps) | ex-MR 483 Class | 160 | (1912–23) | 4-4-0 | 2P | | |
| 563–90, 592–638, 640–700 | Fowler Class 2P | 136 | 1928–32 | 4-4-0 | 2P | | |
| 711–762 (with gaps) | ex-MR Class 3P | 22 | 1902–05 | 4-4-0 | 3P | | |
| 900–939, 1045–1099 | Fowler Class 4P | 195 | 1924–32 | 4-4-0 | 4P | Compound locomotive | |
| 1000–1044 | ex-MR 1000 Class | 45 | 1902–09 | 4-4-0 | 4P | 5 built by LMS | |
| 1200–1209 | Ivatt 2-6-2T | 10 | 1946 | 2-6-2T | 2P | 120 more built 1948–52 for BR | |
| 1239/46–47/49/51–52/55/60–61 | ex-MR 1252 Class | 9 | | 0-4-4T | 1P | Allocated numbers 58030–58038 by BR, but only 58033/36/38 applied | |
| 1272–73/75/78/90/95/98, 1303/15/22/24/30 | ex-MR 1532 Class | 14 | | 0-4-4T | 1P | Allocated numbers 58039–58051 by BR, but only 58040-43/45-7 applied | |
| 1337/40/–42/44/48/50 | ex-MR 1823 Class | 7 | | 0-4-4T | 1P | Allocated numbers 58052–58058 by BR | |
| 1353/57–58/60/65–68/70–71/73/75/77/79 | ex-MR 1833 Class | 6 | | 0-4-4T | 1P | Allocated numbers 58059–58072 by BR | |
| 1382/89–90/96–97, 1402/06/11/13/16/20–26/29–30 | ex-MR 2228 Class | 29 | | 0-4-4T | 1P | Allocated numbers 58073–58091 by BR | |
| 1509 | ex-MR 1322 Class | 1 | 1890 | 0-4-0ST | 0F | In departmental stock | |
| 1516/18/23 | ex-MR 1116A Class | 3 | 1897–1903 | 0-4-0ST | 0F | 1506 (41509) in departmental stock | |
| 1528–1537 | ex-MR 1528 Class | 10 | 1907–22 | 0-4-0T | 0F | | At Gloucester Docks |
| 1550 | ex-MR Battery Locomotive | 1 | | 4w | ? | Miscellaneous locomotive not in capital stock | |
| 1660–1895 (with gaps) | ex-MR 1377 Class | 95 | 1878–99 | 0-6-0T | 1F | 18 were not applied BR numbers | 1759, in May 1947 |
| 1900–1909 | Stanier 0-4-4T | 10 | 1932–33 | 0-4-4T | 2P | | |
| 1980–1993 | ex-LT&SR 69 Class | 14 | 1903–12 | 0-6-2T | 3F | | |
| 2092–2104/06–09 | ex-LT&SR 51 Class | 17 | | 4-4-2T | 2P | | |
| 2110–2160 | ex-LT&SR 79 Class | 39 | | 4-4-2T | 3P | 35 built by LMS; allocated Nos 1928–75 in 1947 but not yet applied | |
| 2187–2299 | Fairburn 2-6-4T | 130 | 1945–47 | 2-6-4T | 4P | 147 more built 1948–51 for BR | |
| 2300–2424 | Fowler 2-6-4T | 125 | 1927–34 | 2-6-4T | 4P | | |
| 2425–94, 2537–2672 | Stanier 2-6-4T (2 cylinders) | 206 | 1935–43 | 2-6-4T | 4P | | |
| 2500–2536 | Stanier 2-6-4T (3 cylinders) | 37 | 1934 | 2-6-4T | 4P | | |
| 2700–2944 | Hughes 2-6-0 'Crab' | 245 | 1927–32 | 2-6-0 | 4P5F | | |
| 2945–2984 | Stanier 2-6-0 | 40 | 1933–34 | 2-6-0 | 4P5F | | |
| 3000–3002 | Ivatt Class 4 | 3 | 1947 | 2-6-0 | 4F | 159 more built 1948–52 for BR | |
| 3021-3130 | ex-MR 5'3" class 2F | 43 | | 0-6-0 | 2F | | |
| 3131-3136 | ex-MR 4'11" class 2F | 11 | | 0-6-0 | 2F | | |
| 3137-3193 | ex-MR 4'11" class 3F | | | 0-6-0 | 3F | | |
| 3194 etc | ex-SDJR 5'3" class 3F | 9 | | 0-6-0 | 3F | | |
| 3190 etc | ex-MR 5'3" class 2F | 66 | | 0-6-0 | 2F | | |
| 3191 etc | ex-MR 5'3" class 3F | | | 0-6-0 | 3F | | |
| 3323 | ex-LNWR Special Tank | | | 0-6-0ST | ? | In departmental stock. See also Wolverton engines below | |
| 3835–4026 | ex-MR 3835 Class | 192 | 1911–22 | 0-6-0 | 4F | | |
| 4027–4556/62–4605 | Fowler Class 4F | 575 | 1924–40 | 0-6-0 | 4F | | |
| 4557–4561 | ex-S&DJR Class 4F | 5 | 1922 | 0-6-0 | 4F | | |
| 4758–5499 | Stanier Class 5 4-6-0 | 742 | 1934–47 | 4-6-0 | 5P5F | 100 more built 1948–51 for BR | |
| 5500…5551 | Patriot Class | 44 | 1930–34 | 4-6-0 | 5XP | | |
| 5514/21/26/28–31/40 | Rebuilt Patriot Class | 8 | (1946–47) | 4-6-0 | 6P | Another 10 rebuilt 1948–49 | |
| 5552–5734/37–42 | Jubilee Class | 189 | 1934–36 | 4-6-0 | 5XP | | 5690 'Leander' |
| 5735/36 | Rebuilt Jubilee Class | 2 | (1942) | 4-6-0 | 6P | | |
| 6004 | ex-LNWR Rebuilt Claughton Class | 1 | (1928) | 4-6-0 | 5XP | Allocated number 46004 by BR, but never applied | Locomotive No. 2222 |
| 6100…6167 | Royal Scot Class | 27 | 1927–30 | 4-6-0 | 6P | All also rebuilt 1949–55 | |
| 6101…6169 | Rebuilt Royal Scot Class | 43 | (1943–55) | 4-6-0 | 6P | | |
| 6170 | British Legion | 1 | (1935) | 4-6-0 | 6P | Rebuilt high-pressure locomotive 6399 Fury, prototype for the rebuilt Royal Scots | |
| 6200/01, 6203–12 | Princess Royal Class | 12 | 1933–35 | 4-6-2 | 7P | | |
| 6202 | Turbomotive | 1 | 1935 | 4-6-2 | 7P | Rebuilt as a conventional Class 8P in 1952 | |
| 6220–6256 | Coronation Class | 37 | 1937–47 | 4-6-2 | 7P | Subdivided into 5 'Coronations', 10 'Duchesses' and 22 'Cities'. Another one under construction | |
| 6400–19 | Ivatt Class 2 2-6-0 | 20 | 1946–47 | 2-6-0 | 2F | 108 more built 1948–53 for BR | |
| 6428 | ex-LNWR Chopper Tank | 1 | | 2-4-0T | 1P | Renumbered 26428, then 58092 by BR | |
| 6601…6757 | ex-LNWR 5ft 6in Tank | 43 | | 2-4-2T | 1P | | |
| 6762 | ex-L&YR Class 5 | 1 | | 2-4-2T | 2P | An ex-Wirral Railway L&YR-built locomotive. As the Wirral Railway stock was numbered in the LMS's ex-LNWR block at the Grouping, 6762 carried a number out of sequence from the other Class 5s, its "original" number of 10638 being allocated, but never used. | |
| 6876 etc | ex-LNWR 5 ft Class 2P | 15 | | 0-6-2T | 2P | | |
| 7000–04 | Kitson Class 0F | 5 | | 0-4-0ST | 0F | Another 5 built by BR in 1953–54 | |
| 7058 | diesel shunter 7058 | 1 | | 0-6-0DE | 300 hp | Allocated number 13000 by BR, but never applied. | |
| 7074/76/79–99 | diesel shunter | 23 | | 0-6-0DE | 350 hp | Became British Rail Class D3/6. | |
| 7110–19 | diesel shunter | 10 | | 0-6-0DE | 350 hp | Became British Rail Class D3/7. | |
| 7120–29 | diesel shunter | 10 | | 0-6-0DE | 350 hp | Became British Rail Class D3/8 (later Class 11); another 110 under construction. | |
| 7160–69 | Fowler Dock Tank | 10 | | 0-6-0T | 2F | | |
| 7180–83 | Sentinels 7180-3 | 4 | | 0-4-0T | 0F | | |
| 7184 | Sentinel 7184 | 1 | | 0-4-0T | 0F | | |
| 7190/1 | ex-S&DJR Sentinels | 2 | | 0-4-0T | 0F | Both built by LMS | |
| 7200–7259 | ex-MR 2441 Class | 60 | | 0-6-0T | 3F | | |
| 7260 etc | Fowler 3F (Jinty) | 417 | | 0-6-0T | 3F | Ordered by MR; another 5 returned from War Department in 1948. | |
| 7862/5 | ex-LNWR Dock Tank | 2 | | 0-4-2ST | 1F | | 7862 at Crewe Works in 1948 |
| 7875-etc | ex-LNWR 1185 Class | 9 | | 0-8-2T | 6F | | 7892 awaiting scrapping in 1948 |
| 7930- | ex-LNWR 380 Class | 14 | | 0-8-4T | 7F | | |
| 7967–99 | Garratt | 33 | | 2-6-0+0-6-2 | not classified | | |
| 8000 etc | Stanier Class 8F | 556 | | 2-8-0 | 8F | | |
| 8705–58/60–72 | LNER Class O6 | 67 | | 2-8-0 | 8F | On loan from LNER. | |
| 8801/24/34 | ex-LNWR 19in Express Goods Class | 3 | | 4-6-0 | 4F | Allocated numbers 48801/24/34 by BR, but never applied. | |
| 8892 | ex-LNWR Class G1 | 123 | | 0-8-0 | 6F | | |
| 8893 | ex-LNWR Class G2A | 319 | | 0-8-0 | 7F | | |
| 9395–9454 | ex-LNWR Class G2 | 60 | | 0-8-0 | 7F | | |
| 9500 | LMS Fowler Class 7F | 175 | | 0-8-0 | 7F | | |
| 10000 | Ivatt Co-Co Diesel Electric | 1 | | Co-Co | 1600 hp | Became British Rail Class D16/1; another one under construction | |
| 10412 | ex-L&YR Class 8 | 7 | | 4-6-0 | 5P | | |
| 10617 | ex-L&YR Hughes Railmotor | 1 | | N/A | not classified | Railmotor; BR Number never applied | |
| 10621- | ex-L&YR Class 5 | 109 | | 2-4-2T | 2P | | |
| 10835- | ex-L&YR Class 6 | 14 | | 2-4-2T | 3P | | |
| 11202- | ex-L&YR Class 21 | 23 | | 0-4-0ST | 0F | | |
| 11304/5/24/68/94 | ex-L&YR Class 23 | 5 | | 0-6-0ST | 2F | In departmental stock | |
| 11307 etc | ex-L&YR Class 23 | 96 | | 0-6-0ST | 2F | | |
| 11535 etc | ex-L&YR Class 24 | 5 | | 0-6-0T | 1F | | |
| 12016 etc | ex-L&YR Class 25 | 25 | | 0-6-0 | 2F | | 957 preserved today |
| 12088 etc | ex-L&YR Class 27 | 245 | | 0-6-0 | 3F | | |
| 12494 etc | ex-FR Class 3F | 6 | | 0-6-0 | 3F | | |
| 12528 etc | ex-L&YR Class 28 | 37 | | 0-6-0 | 3F | 63 rebuilt from Class 27 | |
| 12727 etc | ex-L&YR Class 30 | 12 | | 0-8-0 | 6F | | |
| 12841 etc | ex-L&YR Class 31 | 17 | | 0-8-0 | 7F | | |
| 13800-10 | ex-S&DJR Class 7F | 11 | | 2-8-0 | 7F | 5 built by LMS | |
| 14630 etc | ex-CR 60 Class | 23 | | 4-6-0 | 4P | | 14640 at Motherwell in 1948 |
| 14764/7 | ex-HR Clan Class | 7 | | 4-6-0 | 4P | Reclassified as '5F' by LMS | |
| 15051/3 | ex-HR Class 0P | 2 | | 0-4-4T | 0P | | |
| 15116 etc | ex-CR Class 2P | 116 | | 0-4-4T | 2P | Some built by LMS | 55178 at St Rollox Locomotive Depot in August 1948 |
| 15350 | ex-CR 944 Class | 10 | | 4-6-2T | 4P | | |
| 16010 etc | ex-CR 264 Class (Pug Class) | 14 | | 0-4-0ST | 0F | | |
| 16151-73 | ex-CR 498 Class | 21 | | 0-6-0T | 2F | | |
| 16230-376 | ex-CR 29 & 782 Classes | 147 | | 0-6-0T | 3F | | |
| 16905 | ex-G&SWR Class 3F | 1 | | 0-6-2T | 3F | BR Number never applied | |
| 17230 | ex-CR 294 Class | 158 | | 0-6-0 | 2F | | |
| 17393 | ex-CR 711 Class | 80 | | 0-6-0 | 2F | | |
| 17550 | ex-CR 812 Class | 76 | | 0-6-0 | 3F | | |
| 17629 | ex-CR 652 Class | 17 | | 0-6-0 | 3F | | |
| 17650 | ex-CR 300 Class | 29 | | 0-6-0 | 3F | | |
| 17693 | ex-HR Class 3F | 7 | | 0-6-0 | 3F | | |
| 17950/1/3-6 | ex-HR Clan Goods Class | 6 | | 4-6-0 | 4F | | |
| 20155/85, 20216 | ex-MR Johnson Class 1P | 3 | | 2-4-0 | 1P | Allocated numbers 58020–58022 by BR, but never applied. | |
| 22290 | ex-MR Lickey Banker | 1 | | 0-10-0 | not classified | No power classification allocated. Renumbered 58100 by BR | |
| 22900 etc. | ex-MR 4'11" Class 2F | 75 | | 0-6-0 | 2F | Allocated numbers 58114–58187 by BR | |
| 22630, 22846/53/63 | ex-MR 700 Class | 4 | | 0-6-0 | 2F | Allocated numbers 58110–58113 by BR | |
| 25297 | ex-LNWR Whale Precursor Class | 1 | | 4-4-0 | 4P | Allocated number 58010 by BR, but never applied. | |
| 25321/50/73 | ex-LNWR George the Fifth Class | 3 | | 4-4-0 | 4P | 25350/73 allocated 58011/12 by BR, but never applied | |
| 25648/73/752/87 | ex-LNWR Prince of Wales Class | 4 | | 4-6-0 | 4P | Allocated numbers 58000–3 by BR, but never applied | |
| 27217 | ex-NLR Crane Tank | 1 | | 0-4-2ST | 0F | Allocated 58865 by BR | |
| 27480 | ex-LNWR 2F | 1 | | 0-6-0T | 2F | Allocated 58870 by BR, but never applied | |
| 27505 | ex-NLR Class 75 | 15 | | 0-6-0T | 2F | Allocated 58850–58863 by BR | |
| 27553...27830 | ex-LNWR 17in Coal Tank | 64 | | 0-6-2T | 2F | Allocated 58880–58937 by BR | |
| 28088... | ex-LNWR 17in Coal Engine | 35 | | 0-6-0 | 2F | Allocated 58321–58361 (with gaps) by BR | |
| 28313...28622 | ex-LNWR 18in Goods | 75 | | 0-6-0 | 2F | "Cauliflower" class; allocated 58362–58430 by BR | |
| 73798/9 | WD Austerity 2-10-0 | 2 | | 2-10-0 | 8F | On loan from War Department | |

=== Engineering Department series ===
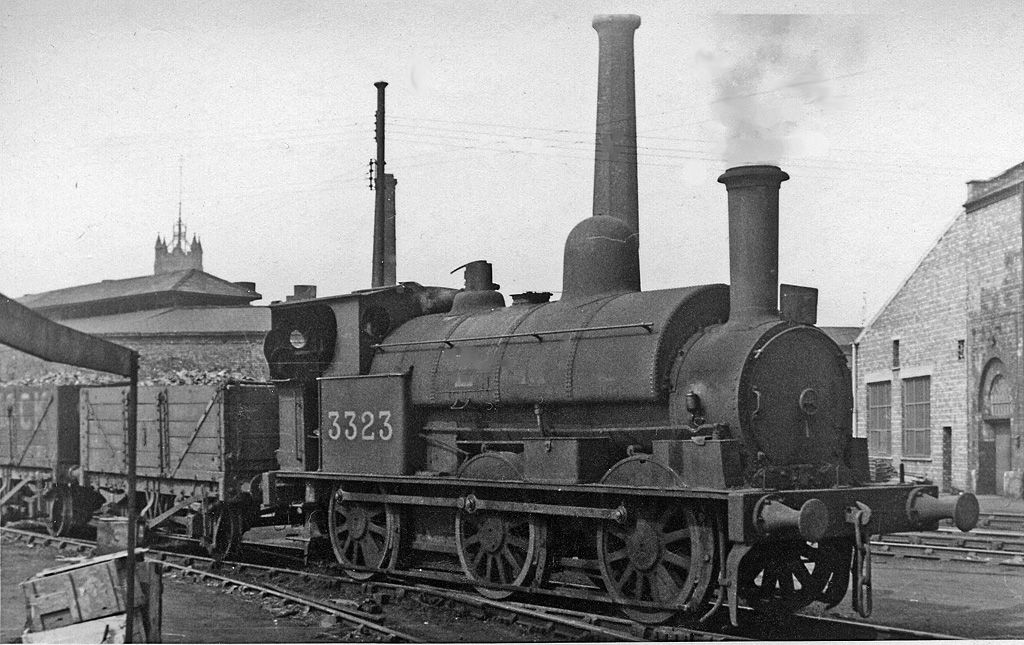

ED No. 2

=== Wolverton Carriage Works series ===
Wolverton Carriage Works had their own separately numbered series. They had four ex-LNWR Special Tanks, Numbers 3, 6, 7 and 8.

== Irish locomotives ==
For completeness, Irish locomotives will be given here.

=== NCC broad gauge ===
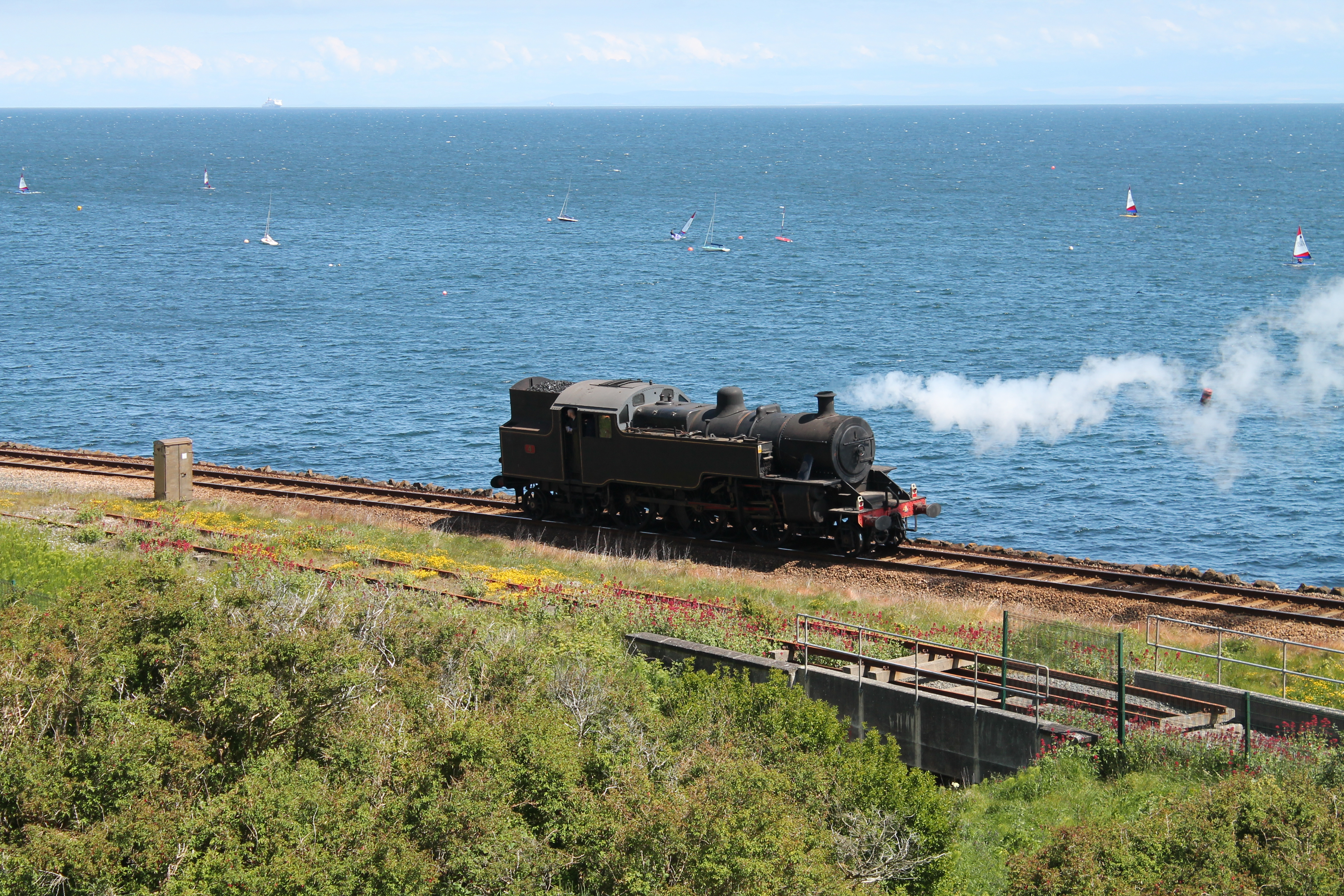
No. 4 on running-in trials at Whitehead in 2015

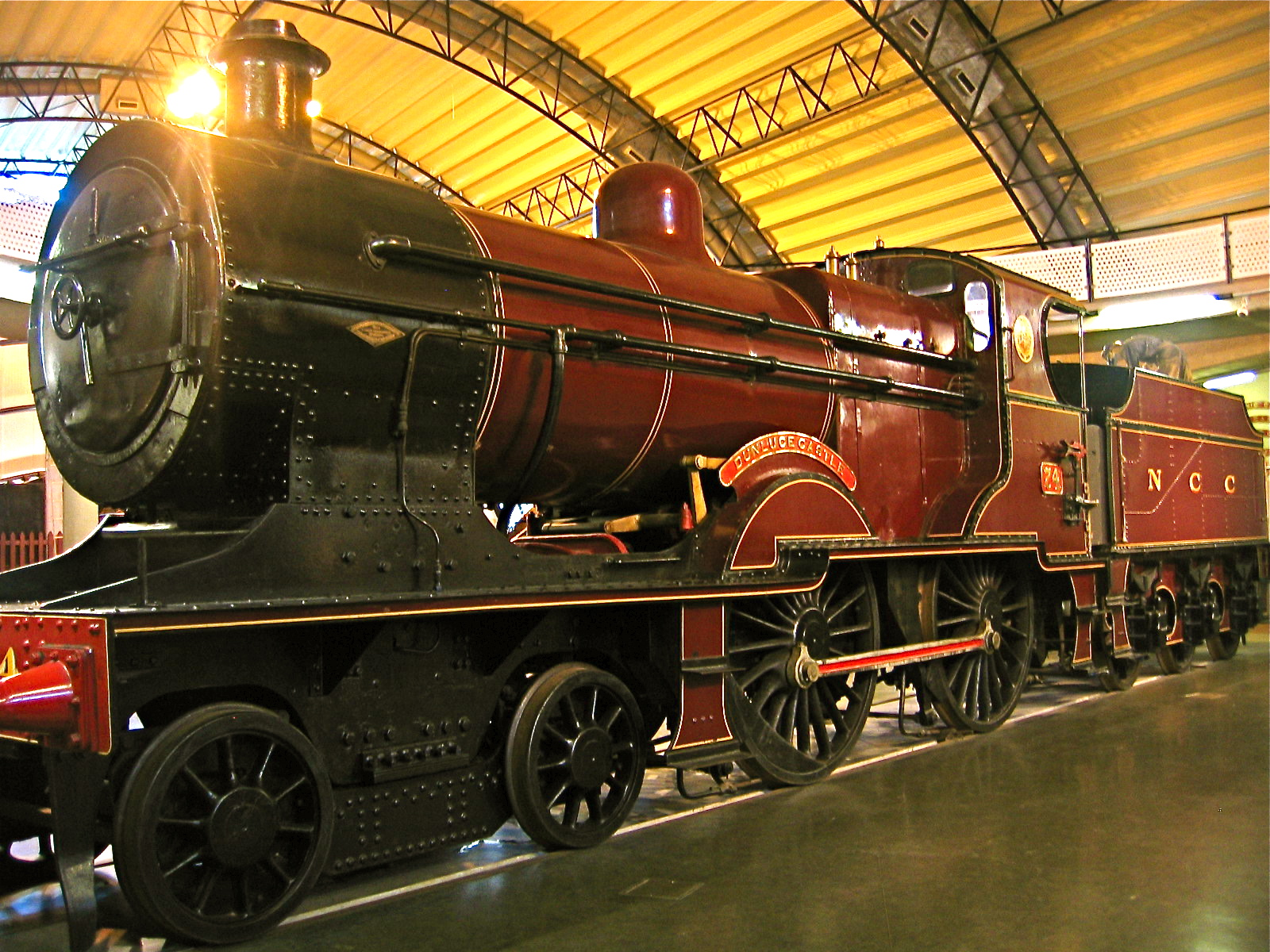
NCC 74 Dunluce Castle at the Ulster Folk and Transport Museum, Cultra, 2016

Class WT locomotives were built at Derby Works in England to the design of George Ivatt between 1946 and 1950. They were numbered 1–10 and 50–57. They were a tank engine version of the NCC Class W moguls. A tank engine did not require turning at termini and the LMS had produced a series of successful 2-6-4Ts. Like the LMS Fairburn 2-6-4T built at the same time, they had a hopper bunker and absence of plating ahead of the cylinders. They were based on the LMS Fowler 2-6-4T by Sir Henry Fowler.

In December 1962 locomotive No.50 received a boiler from one of the ex-NCC 2-6-0 tender locomotives, the boiler and firebox being overhauled and repaired at Derby. In early 1966 and towards the end of their careers, the Class WT locomotives were involved in working notable traffic. This was on spoil trains that transported fill for motorway construction from the Blue Circle cement works at Magheramorne to Greencastle near Belfast. Three trains of twenty hopper wagons each were made up, with a Class WT locomotive at each end. Each train when filled carried 600 tons of rock and in all, some 7,600 trains had carried 4¼ million tons of material by the time the contract ended in May 1970.

The last of the Class WT locomotives were officially withdrawn in 1971 the last time one was in traffic being 22 October 1970. This made them the last steam locomotives in mainline operation in the British Isles; Córas Iompair Éireann steam in the Republic of Ireland having ended in 1962 and British Railways steam in Great Britain having finished in 1968.

One of these locomotives, No.4, has been preserved by the Railway Preservation Society of Ireland which operates it on special mainline trains. The RPSI is also looking at the possibility of building a new member of the class (No.58) to give them a second mainline tank locomotive considering the low availability of turntables on modern day lines. The last locomotives to work in the United Kingdom were two of these tank locomotives. They were nicknamed Jeeps by railway men due to their immense size.

Class W mogul 2-6-0 locomotives worked on the main Belfast to Dublin main line. Also work on the Lisburn to Antrim line. This included goods and passenger work as they were mixed traffic locomotives. Earl of Ulster no 97 was seen frequently on goods trains passing through Goraghwood railway station. They may also have worked ballast trains from Goraghwood quarry. No 100 Queen Elizabeth hauled a royal train in 1952. There is deep regret that no examples of the class were preserved, in particular no 97 Earl of Ulster.

Class U2 4-4-0 locomotives were based on Midland compounds and had compound equipment fitted and tablet catchers to work on single line sections. One of them is preserved at the Ulster Folk and Transport museum and is called Dunluce Castle.

Two ex-LMS Class 3F 0-6-0T Jintys were re-gauged and sent to work as shunters in Belfast renamed Class Y 0-6-0T. Maximum working boiler pressure was 160 psi(lbs).

Also Classes A1, B, B1, C, C1, D, E and E1 were all compounds. This meant they were more efficient as the steam was used twice.

=== DN&GR (broad gauge) ===
0-6-0STs Nos 1–4, 6.

=== County Donegal (narrow gauge) ===
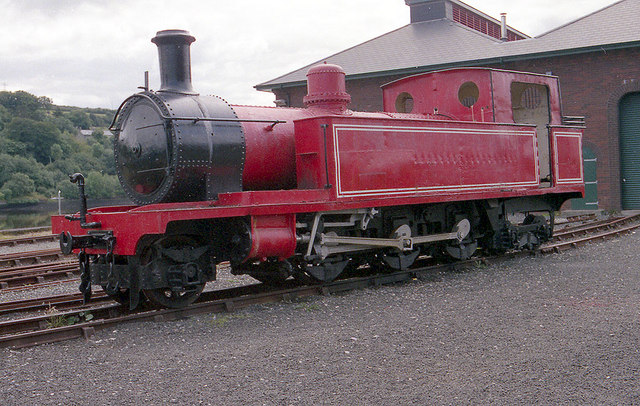
Former CDRJC locomotive at the Foyle Valley Railway Museum

The County Donegal Railways Joint Committee (CDRJC)

== See also ==
- List of LNER locomotives as of 31 December 1947
- Steam locomotives of British Railways
