= Locomotives of the London, Midland and Scottish Railway =

The London, Midland and Scottish Railway had the largest stock of steam locomotives of any of the 'Big Four' Grouping, i.e. pre-Nationalisation railway companies in the UK. Despite early troubles arising from factions within the new company, the LMS went on to build some very successful designs; many lasted until the end of steam traction on British Railways in 1968. For an explanation of numbering and classification, see British Rail locomotive and multiple unit numbering and classification.

Various locomotives were inherited from pre-grouping companies. Those from the smaller railways, and hence non-standard, were withdrawn quite early, while ex-Midland, LNWR and L&YR types persisted.

The Midland had long had a 'small engine policy', preferring small engines hauling frequent, fairly short trains, and employing a second locomotive (double-heading) where necessary. However, this practice, while emininently suitable for the route from Sheffield, Derby and Nottingham to London was not at all suited to the route from Euston to Glasgow via Crewe, Preston and Carlisle (the 'West Coast Main Line') and it took several years to convince the senior staff responsible for such matters that this was the case.

The first sign of the change was the Royal Scot 4-6-0 class of 1927, officially designed by Fowler, but actually designed by the North British Locomotive Company with approval from Henry Fowler. Nevertheless, the majority of designs continued to be very much Midland in character.

This changed when William Stanier arrived. His large, streamlined 'Princess Coronation' class engines were iconic and flew the flag for the LMS against the competing Class A4 of the London and North Eastern Railway.

== Locomotives acquired from constituent companies ==
See LMS locomotive numbering and classification for an explanation of the numbers allocated to inherited locomotives and the power classification system used below.

=== Ex-Midland Railway ===
The Midland shaped the subsequent LMS locomotive policy until 1933. Its locomotives (which it always referred to as engines) followed a corporate small engine policy, with numerous class 2F, 3F and 4F 0-6-0s for goods work, 2P and 4P 4-4-0s for passenger work, and 0-4-4T and 0-6-0T tank engines. The only exceptions to this were its 0-10-0 banking engine for Lickey Incline on its Bristol-Birmingham line, and the 7F 2-8-0 goods engines built by the Midland at their Derby locomotive works for the Somerset and Dorset Joint Railway.

=== Ex-London and North Western Railway ===
The LNWR did not have a significant impact on LMS policy as the Midland, although it did inspire the Fowler-built 7F.

=== Ex-North Staffordshire Railway ===
The North Staffordshire Railway handed over 192 standard gauge engines into the LMS capital stock.

| NSR Number | LMS Number | Wheel arrangement | Class | LMS Power classification | Notes |
|---|---|---|---|---|---|
Passenger tender locomotives
| 86–87, 170–171 | 595–598 | 4-4-0 | G | 3P | An Adams design from 1910. Renumbered 5410–5413 in 1928. |
| 38 | 599 | 4-4-0 | KT | 3P | Adams design built 1912. Renumbered 5414 in 1928. |
Passenger tank locomotives
| 9, 11–12, 41–42 | 1431–1435 | 0-4-4T | M | 3P | An Adams design of 1907. |
| 15, 17, 19, 54 | 1436–1439 | 0-4-4T | New M | 3P | Slightly modified class M (longer bunkers), built 1920 by then locomotive superintendent Hookham |
| 1A, 2A, 7, 10A, 17A, 18A, 22A, 23A, 27A, 29A, 48A, 71 | 1440–1451 | 2-4-0T | B | 1P | Longbottom class between 1882 and 1895 |
| 21, 24, 35, 40, 52, 61 | 1454–1459 | 2-4-2T | B | 1P | Rebuilt from Longbottom classes of 1878–1895 |
| 4–5, 30–31, 53, 70, 173–174 | 2040–2047 | 0-6-4T | C | 5F | Adams class of 1914. Despite their freight engine power classification the class was considered by the LMS to be a passenger engine class and were painted in a passenger engine colour scheme. |
| 114–121 | 2048–2055 | 0-6-4T | F | 4P | Adams class of 1916–1919 |
| 8, 13–14, 39, 45–46, 55 | 2180–2186 | 4-4-2T | K | 3P | Adams class of 1911–1912 |
Goods tank locomotives
| 3, 16, 20, 32, 33–34, 36–37, 43–44, 47, 49–50, 56–57, 60, 62–63, 73, 124A, 125A, 126–153 | 1550–1598 | 0-6-0T | D | 2F | Longbottom class of 1882–1889 |
| 23 | 1599 | 0-6-0T | 4 Cylinder D | 3F | Hookham 4-cylinder experimental. 1599 not carried by the engine before it was rebuilt in 1924 as tender locomotive and numbered 2367; renumbered 8689 before being withdrawn. |
| 58A, 59A | 1600–1601 | 0-6-0ST | ST | 1F | Built by Hudswell Clarke in 1866 |
| 74–75 | 1602–1603 | 0-6-0T | KS | 1F | Built by Kerr Stuart in 1919 |
| 58–59, 76–77, 154–155, | 2234–2239 | 0-6-2T | DX | 2F | Longbottom class of 1899–1902 |
| 1–2, 10, 18, 22, 25–29, 48, 51, 64–65, 69, 72, 89, 93–99, 124–125, 156–158, 165–168, 172 | 2240–2273 | 0-6-2T | L & New L | 3F | Adams class of 1903–1923. 2270–2273 (NSR numbers 1, 2, 10 & 48) were constructed by the LMS and were the last locomotives built at Stoke works. |
Goods tender locomotives
| 66–68, 70A, 74A, 75A, 104–113, 116A, 118A, 119A, 120A, 121A, 122–123 | 2320–2342 | 0-6-0 | E | 1F | Clare class of 1871–1877. Engines remaining in 1928 renumbered 8650–8664 |
| 78–83, 100–103 | 2343–2350, 2357–2358 | 0-6-0 | '100' | 2F | Longbottom class of 1896–1907; In 1928 renumbered 8665–8672, 8679–8680 |
| 159–164 | 2351–2356 | 0-6-0 | '159' | 2F | Longbottom class of 1900; In 1928 renumbered 8673–8678 |
| 6, 84–85, 88, 90–92, 169 | 2359–2366 | 0-6-0 | H | 3F | Adams class of 1909–1911; In 1928 renumbered 8681–8688 |

In addition to the above, also added to the capital stock were the three NSR 0-2-2 railmotors numbered 1–3. These were not renumbered by the LMS before scrapping in 1927.

There were two other additions to the capital stock, the two locomotives of the 2 feet 6 inches (0.76 m) narrow gauge Leek and Manifold Valley Light Railway. These two engines, number 1 E.R. Calthrop and number 2 J.B. Earle kept both their names and numbers under the LMS.

Four locomotives were added to the LMS service stock. Standard gauge 0-4-0 battery electric locomotive, built in 1917, and three, 3 feet 6 inches (1.07 m) gauge, 0-4-0ST locomotives called Frog, Toad and Bob that worked the Caldon Low tramway, owned by the NSR. None of these locomotives were numbered by the LMS.

=== Ex-Caledonian Railway ===
The class number used for Caledonian Railway engines was the stock number of the first member of the class to reach traffic. Hence earlier numbered classes could well have appeared later in time.

=== Ex-Furness Railway ===
The Furness Railway was a small company with a correspondingly small locomotive stock. It is known best for the Baltic tanks (which seemed to be a little more successful than the Lancashire and Yorkshire Railway examples of the same arrangement). The Baltics did not survive for long. The only class that survived as far as nationalisation were some moderate sized 0-6-0 tender engines classified '3F' by the LMS and as D5 by Bob Rush. Six were still in traffic as of 31 August 1948.

== Hughes (1923–1925) ==
George Hughes, formerly of the L&YR, became the first Chief Mechanical Engineer (CME) of the LMS. However, he retired just two years later in 1925. His one new design was a class of mixed traffic moguls known as "crabs".

- Class 5MT "Crab" 2-6-0
- Class 5P Dreadnought tank 4-6-4T, Designed for L&YR, built by the LMS.

He also built small numbers of slightly modified versions of pre-grouping designs including:

- Caledonian Railway 60 Class
- Caledonian Railway 439 Class
- LT&SR 79 Class

== Fowler (1925–1931) ==
Sir Henry Fowler, deputy CME under Hughes, was formerly CME of the Midland Railway. He was largely responsible for the adoption of the Midland's small engines as LMS standards. This led to a crisis as these were underpowered. However, some moves towards larger engines were made, particularly through the Royal Scots and Garratts. At the end of Fowler's reign, Ernest Lemon briefly took over as CME, but was quickly promoted to make room for William Stanier.

- LMS Class 2P 4-4-0
- LMS Class 2F "Dock Tank" 0-6-0T
- LMS Class 3MT 2-6-2T
- LMS Class 3F "Jinty" 0-6-0T
- LMS Class 4P "Compound" 4-4-0
- LMS Class 4P 2-6-4T
- LMS Class 4F "Derby Four" 0-6-0
- LMS Class 7F 0-8-0
- LMS Class 6P "Patriot" 4-6-0
- LMS Class 7P "Royal Scot" 4-6-0
- LMS Garratt 2-6-0+0-6-2
- LMS 6399 Fury

=== Stock taken in from the Somerset and Dorset Joint Railway ===
The Somerset and Dorset Joint Railway was jointly owned by the LMS and the Southern with the LMS responsible for locomotive affairs. However, its locomotives were kept separate until 1928 when they were taken into LMS stock. These mostly consisted of standard Midland types constructed by the Midland and the LMS. The S&DJR 7F 2-8-0, however, was specific to the line.

- S&DJR 7F 2-8-0
- S&DJR Sentinels
- and other Midland types.

== Stanier (1932–1944) ==
William Stanier arrived in 1932 from the Great Western Railway and, with the backing of Josiah Stamp, reversed the small engine policy.

- LMS Class 2P 0-4-4T
- LMS Class 3MT 2-6-2T
- LMS Class 4P 2-6-4T (two- and three-cylindered)
- LMS Class 5MT 2-6-0
- LMS Class 5MT "Black Five" 4-6-0
- LMS Class 6P "Jubilee" 4-6-0
- LMS Class 8P "Princess Coronation" 4-6-2
- LMS Class 8P "Princess Royal" 4-6-2
- LMS Class 8F 2-8-0
- LMS Turbomotive
- LMS Class 6P Rebuilt Jubilee
- LMS Class 7P Rebuilt Royal Scot

== Fairburn (1944–1945) ==
Charles Fairburn was somewhat restricted by the rules applied to the railway companies by the war situation (not to mention the fact that Stanier had left things in a state that required little or no new design). He was responsible for the construction of a number of locomotives to Stanier designs (mainly the 8F 2-8-0 and 5MT 4-6-0) and some detailed design variations on the latter. He died of a heart attack in October 1945.

- LMS Class 4MT 2-6-4T

== Ivatt (1946–1947) ==
George Ivatt, son of the former GNR CME Henry Ivatt, became CME in 1946. He continued building some Stanier types, but introduced some low-powered class 2 engines and a medium-powered class 4 mixed traffic design. A pair of main line diesels were also produced.

- LMS Class 2MT 2-6-0
- LMS Class 2MT 2-6-2T
- LMS Class 4MT 2-6-0
- NCC Class WT 2-6-4T, based on the Fowler 2-6-4T design of 1927.
- LMS Class 5MT "Black Five" 4-6-0 (modified version)
- LMS Class 6P "Rebuilt Patriot" 4-6-0
- LMS Class 8P "Princess Coronation" 4-6-2 (modified version)

== Modern Traction ==
The LMS experimented with various forms of non-steam locomotives, and pioneered the use of diesel locomotives in Great Britain.

- LMS diesel locomotives
- LMS diesel shunters
  - LMS diesel shunter 1831
- LMS petrol shunters
- LMS railcars

== Post-Nationalisation ==
LMS locomotive design did not end in at Nationalisation in 1948, for it had enormous influence over the design of British Railways' 'Standard' steam locomotives by former LMS man Robert Riddles. Some of the designs were little changed from the comparable designs by Ivatt.

Riddles built several examples of designs from the 'Big Four', including most of the Fairburn/Ivatt tank engines. These were distributed around the system, with many of the 2-6-2T designs going to the Southern Region.

== Withdrawal ==
Pre-grouping types were withdrawn early for being non-standard, and locomotives were routinely withdrawn after their lives expired.

Locomotive withdrawal generally did not take place until British Railways' Modernisation Plan accelerated during 1962–1966. A pair of "Black Fives" were the last mainline steam locomotives to run on British Railways in 1968.

== Preservation ==
A significant number of LMS locomotives have been preserved:

- Three LMS Hughes Crabs
- Nine LMS Class 3F "Jinty" 0-6-0Ts
- Three LMS Class 4F 0-6-0s
- Two LMS Royal Scot Class
- One LMS 3-Cylindered Stanier 2-6-4T
- One LMS Stanier Mogul
- Eighteen Black Fives
- Four LMS Jubilee Class
- Two LMS Princess Royal Class
- Three LMS Princess Coronation Class pacifics
- Twelve LMS Stanier Class 8Fs
- Two LMS Fairburn 2-6-4Ts
- Seven LMS Ivatt Class 2 2-6-0s
- Four LMS Ivatt Class 2 2-6-2Ts
- One LMS Ivatt Class 4

A smaller number of pre-grouping locomotives inherited by the LMS have also been preserved.

== See also ==
- List of LMS locomotives as of 31 December 1947
