= LMS/BR Class 4 2-6-4T locomotives =

The London, Midland and Scottish Railway and British Railways Class 4 2-6-4T was a family of classes of steam locomotives. A grand total of 800 engines were built to five separate designs by four different mechanical engineers, over a period of 29 years. Each new design was a development of the previous one. The LMS gave the whole group the power classification 4P, under BR 4MT. They are therefore grouped as follows:

LMS Nos	BR Nos	Design	Designer	Built	Built by LMS	Built by BR	Total built
2300–2424	42300–42424	Fowler	Henry Fowler	1927–1934	125	0	125
2500–2536	42500–42536	Stanier, 3 cylinder	William Stanier	1934	37	0	37
2425–2494, 2537–2672	42425–42494, 42537–42672	Stanier, 2 cylinder	William Stanier	1935–1943	206	0	206
2187–2299, 2673–2699	42050–42299, 42673–42699	Fairburn	Charles Fairburn	1945–1951	130	147	277
—	80000–80154	BR Standard	Robert Riddles	1951–1956	0	155	155
			Total	1927–1956	498	302	800

== Withdrawal ==
All engines were withdrawn from stock between 1959 and 1967, summarised as follows:

Locomotives withdrawn by year
Year	Fowler	Stanier, 3-cylinder	Stanier, 2-cylinder	Fairburn	BR Standard	Total
1959	5	0	0	0	0	5
1960	11	1	2	0	0	14
1961	22	7	17	3	0	49
1962	37	29	43	43	1	153
1963	16	0	29	30	0	75
1964	20	0	51	57	31	159
1965	12	0	38	54	44	148
1966	2	0	11	48	54	115
1967	0	0	15	42	25	82
Total	125	37	206	277	155	800

Locomotives in service at year end
Year	Fowler	Stanier, 3-cylinder	Stanier, 2-cylinder	Fairburn	BR Standard	Total
1958	125	37	206	277	155	800
1959	120	37	206	277	155	795
1960	109	36	204	277	155	781
1961	87	29	187	274	155	732
1962	50	0	144	231	154	579
1963	34	0	115	201	154	504
1964	14	0	64	144	123	345
1965	2	0	26	90	79	197
1966	0	0	15	42	25	82
1967	0	0	0	0	0	0

== Technical comparison ==
For technical purposes, it is worth splitting the Fairburn tanks into two subclasses; early (42050–42146) and late (42147–42699) as their weights differ slightly.

Attribute	Fowler	Stanier, 3 cylinder	Stanier, 2 cylinder	Fairburn (early) (Note: Derby Lots 177, 185, 186, and 196: locomotives 42147–42699, built 1945–1949)	Fairburn (late) (Note: Derby Lots 202, 210, and all Brighton-built locomotives: numbers 42050–42146, built 1948–1951)	BR Standard
Leading wheel diameter	3 ft 3 1/2 in (1.003 m)					3 ft 0 in (0.914 m)
Driving wheel diameter	5 ft 9 in (1.753 m)					5 ft 8 in (1.727 m)
Trailing wheel diameter	3 ft 3 1/2 in (1.003 m)					3 ft 0 in (0.914 m)
Wheelbase	38 ft 6 in (11.73 m)			37 ft 1 in (11.30 m)		36 ft 10 in (11.23 m)
Length	47 ft 2 3/4 in (14.40 m)			45 ft 9 3/4 in (13.96 m)		44 ft 9 7/8 in (13.66 m)
Weight	86.25 long tons (87.63 t)	92.25 long tons (93.73 t)	87.75 long tons (89.16 t)	85.25 long tons (86.62 t)	84.70 long tons (86.06 t)	86.50 long tons (87.89 t)
Axleload						17.95 long tons (18.24 t)
Coal capacity	3.50 long tons (3.56 t)					
Water capacity	2,000 imp gal (9,100 L)				1,875 imp gal (8,500 L)	2,000 imp gal (9,100 L)
Boiler	G8AS	4C				ABR5
Boiler pressure	200 psi (1.38 MPa)					225 psi (1.55 MPa)
Firegrate area	25 sq ft (2.3 m^{2})					26.7 sq ft (2.48 m^{2})
Heating surface: Tubes	1,082 sq ft (100.5 m^{2})	1,011 sq ft (93.9 m^{2})				1,223 sq ft (113.6 m^{2})
Heating surface: Firebox	138 sq ft (12.8 m^{2})	137 sq ft (12.7 m^{2})				143 sq ft (13.3 m^{2})
Superheater area	266 sq ft / 246 sq ft	160 sq ft/154 sq ft				240 sq ft (22 m^{2})
Cylinders	2 outside	3 (1 inside, 2 outside)	2 outside			
Cylinder size	19 in × 26 in (483 mm × 660 mm)	16 in × 26 in (406 mm × 660 mm)	19.625 in × 26 in (498 mm × 660 mm)			18 in × 28 in (457 mm × 711 mm)
Tractive effort	23,125 lbf (102.87 kN)	24,598 lbf (109.42 kN)	24,671 lbf (109.74 kN)			25,515 lbf (113.50 kN)

== See also ==
- NCC Class WT
