= BR Standard Class 4 2-6-4T =

Class of locomotive

BR Standard Class 4 tank
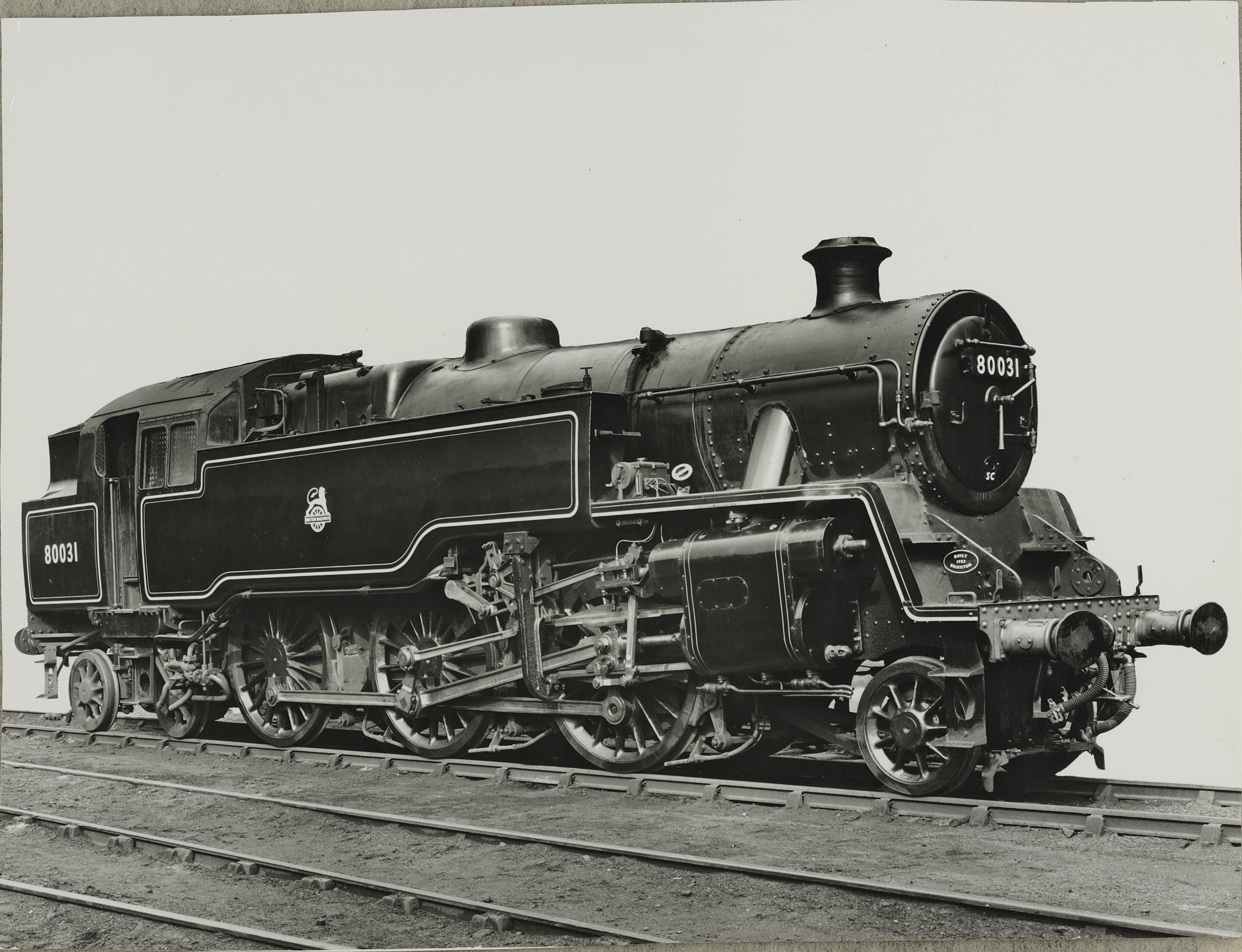
- Brighton Railway Works, BR standard 80031
Type and origin
- Power type: Steam
- Designer: R.A. Riddles
- Builder: Brighton Works (130); Derby Works (15); Doncaster Works (10)
- Build date: July 1951 – November 1956
- Total produced: 155
Specifications
- Configuration
  - Whyte: 2-6-4T
  - UIC: 1′C2′ h2t
- Gauge: 4 ft 8 1/2 in (1,435 mm)
- Leading dia.: 3 ft 0 in (0.914 m)
- Driver dia.: 5 ft 8 in (1.727 m)
- Trailing dia.: 3 ft 0 in (0.914 m)
- Length: 44 ft 10 in (13.67 m)
- Width: 8 ft 9 1/4 in (2.67 m)
- Height: 13 ft 0 in (3.96 m)
- Axle load: 17.95 long tons (18.24 t; 20.10 short tons)
- Adhesive weight: 53.05 long tons (53.90 t; 59.42 short tons)
- Loco weight: 86.65 long tons (88.04 t; 97.05 short tons)
- Fuel type: Coal
- Fuel capacity: 3.5 long tons (3.6 t; 3.9 short tons)
- Water cap.: 2,000 imp gal (9,100 L; 2,400 US gal)
- Firebox
  - Grate area: 26.7 sq ft (2.48 m^{2})
- Boiler: ABR5
- Boiler pressure: 225 psi (1.55 MPa)
- Heating surface
  - Firebox: 143 sq ft (13.3 m^{2})
  - Tubes and flues: 1,223 sq ft (113.6 m^{2})
- Superheater
  - Heating area: 240 sq ft (22 m^{2})
- Cylinders: Two, outside
- Cylinder size: 18 in × 28 in (457 mm × 711 mm)
Performance figures
- Tractive effort: 25,515 lbf (113.5 kN)
- Factor of adh.: 4.65
Career
- Operators: British Railways
- Power class: 4MT
- Numbers: 80000–80154
- Axle load class: Route availability 5
- Withdrawn: July 1962 – July 1967
- Disposition: 15 preserved, remainder scrapped

The British Railways Standard Class 4 tank is a class of steam locomotive, one of the BR standard classes built during the 1950s. They were used primarily on commuter and outer suburban services. They were capable of reaching speeds of 75 mph (121 km/h).

== Background ==
On the nationalisation of British Railways (BR) in 1948, the London Midland Region had a number of ex-London, Midland and Scottish Railway 2-6-4T and the Western Region a number of GWR Large Prairie 2-6-2T types. These tank engines were particularly suited to commuter and secondary services. However, particularly in Scotland and the Southern Region, the situation was far less ideal, with large numbers of pre-grouping classes struggling to keep up with traffic.

== Design and construction ==
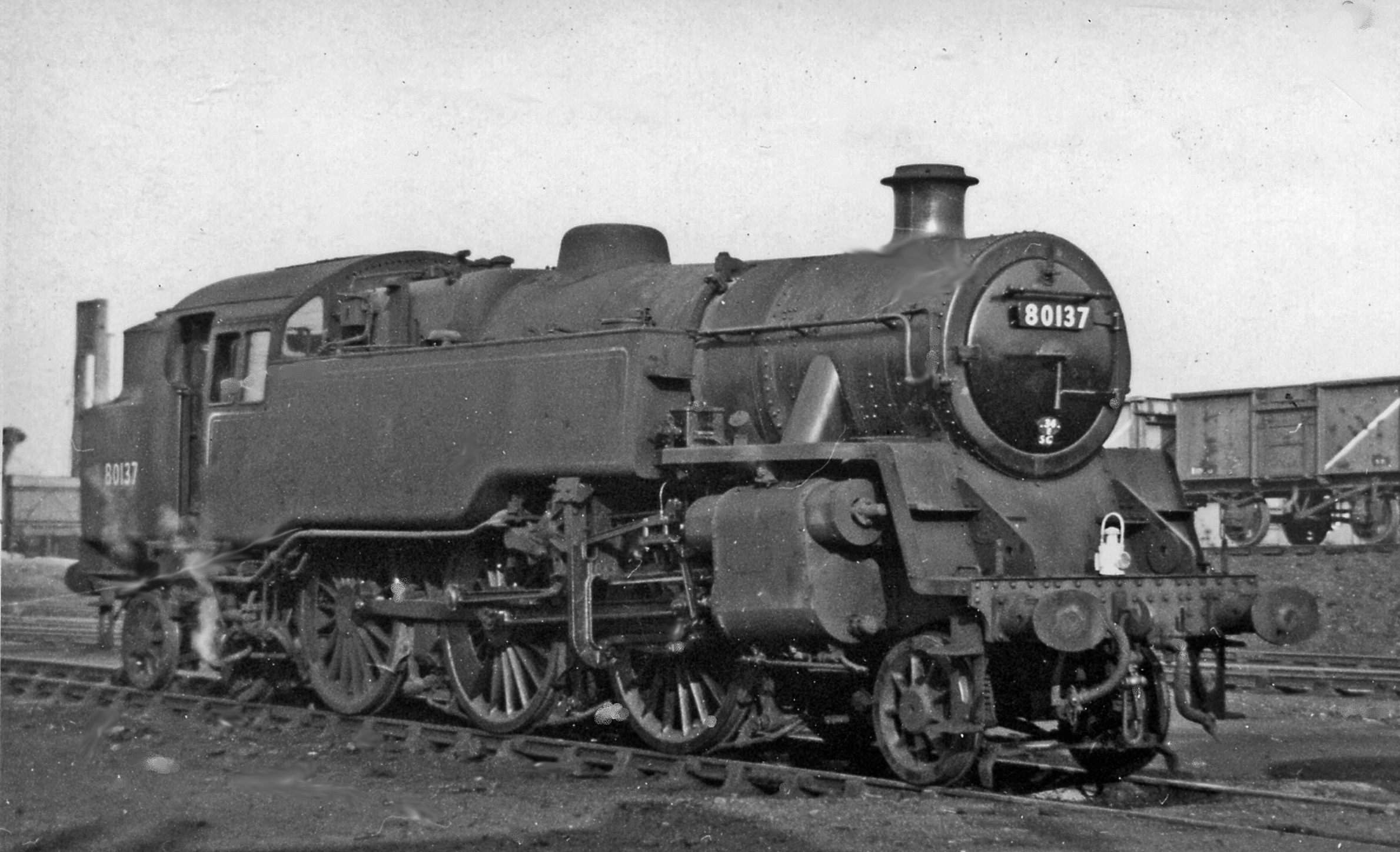
80137 at Neasden Locomotive Depot, 1957

On the decision to build the BR standard series of locomotives, a series of class four tank engines was ordered, based on the ex-LMS Fairburn 2-6-4T with some modifications. The lineage of the class could therefore be tracked through the LMS/BR Class 4 2-6-4T locomotives back to the Fowler design of 1927.

Design work was done at Brighton, the overall programme being overseen by Robert Riddles. The principal modifications to the Fairburn design involved the reduction of their envelope to enable them to fit into the L1 loading gauge. To do this, the tanks and cab were made more curved than the Fairburn design, the Fairburn having a straight-sided tank. The biggest mechanical change was a reduction in cylinder size, also to reduce cross-section, and a corresponding increase in boiler pressure to compensate. Other visible changes included the re-introduction of plating ahead of the cylinders.

130 of the class of 155 were built at Brighton, 15 (80000–80009, 80054–80058) at Derby Works and 10 (80106–80115) at Doncaster Works between 1951 and 1956. The first to emerge was 80010 from Brighton in 1951. Fifteen that were due to be constructed in 1957 were cancelled, due to impending dieselisation, and the last five would have been, too, had they not been at an advanced stage of construction when the order came to cancel them.

No significant modifications were made to the design. The tank vent was found to restrict the driver's vision and was moved further forward from 80059 onwards. Initially built with fluted coupling rods, these caused problems on other classes and, from 80079, plain section coupling rods were substituted.

The BR Standard Class 4 4-6-0 was essentially a tender engine derivative of the Standard Class 4 tank.

== Service ==
The Standard 4 tanks were originally allocated to all regions of British Railways, bar the Western. They became particularly associated with the London, Tilbury and Southend line (LT&S) working commuter services out of London, until that route was electrified in 1962. They were also widely used in East Sussex and Kent, working from Brighton, Tunbridge Wells and Three Bridges on those lines of the former London, Brighton and South Coast Railway that were not electrified. Another group worked from Polmadie depot in the Scottish region on the Glasgow commuter services. Note that, from July 1962, a batch displaced by electrification of the LT&S was transferred to the Western Region's Swansea (East Dock) and Shrewsbury districts, as well as other regions.

== Accidents and incidents ==
- On 24 April 1956, locomotive No. 80119 was derailed at Scalby, Yorkshire when the track spread under it whilst shunting. An instruction banning heavy locomotives from shunting at Scalby had been forgotten.
- On 30 January 1958, locomotive No. 80079 was hauling a passenger train that overran signals and was in a rear-end collision with another passenger train at Dagenham, Essex. Ten people were killed and 89 were injured.
- On 18 April 1961, locomotive No. 80075 was hauling a passenger train that was derailed at Pitsea, Essex due to a pointsman's error during single line working.
- On 9 December 1962, locomotive No. 80102 was derailed at Gosport, Hampshire due to vandalism.

== Withdrawal ==
There was a mass withdrawal of steam locomotive classes in the 1960s. Older types were withdrawn in preference to the Standard 4s, whose class remained intact until 1964 (except for 80103 as noted below). The final nine were withdrawn from the Southern Region on 9 July 1967. One Scottish Region example, 80002, remained in Glasgow past the end of steam haulage until 1969 as a static carriage heating boiler; eventually being preserved on the Keighley & Worth Valley Railway.

No. 80103 was withdrawn in 1962 after being reported for rough riding. It was towed between two other locomotives to Stratford Works, where it was discovered that the mainframe was broken in half. Considered beyond economic repair, 80103 was withdrawn and scrapped. It was the first of the 'Standard' locomotives to be withdrawn, and the only one scrapped at Stratford.

Table of withdrawals
| Year | Quantity in service at start of year | Quantity withdrawn | Locomotive numbers | Notes |
|---|---|---|---|---|
| 1962 | 155 | 1 | 80103 | |
| 1964 | 154 | 31 | 80008–10/17/21/30–31/36/38/40/44/49–50/52–53/56/62/71/73–77/87, 80106–07/15/25/27/29/48. | |
| 1965 | 123 | 42 | 80003/14/18/20/22–23/29/35/42/48/64/66–67/70/72/78–81/84/88/90/97–99, 80100–02/04–05/08–10/19/31/35–37/47/49–50/53. | 80064/72/78-80/97-98, 80100/04-05/35-36/50 preserved |
| 1966 | 81 | 56 | 80000–01/05–07/13/24–28/33–34/37/39/41/43/47/51/54–55/57–61/63/65/68–69/82–83/89/91–96, 80111–14/17–18/21–24/26/30/32/38/41–42/44. | |
| 1967 | 25 | 25 | 80002/04/11–12/15–16/19/32/45–46/85–86, 80116/20/28/33–34/39–40/43/45–46/51–52/54. | 80002, 80151 preserved |

== Operation in preservation ==
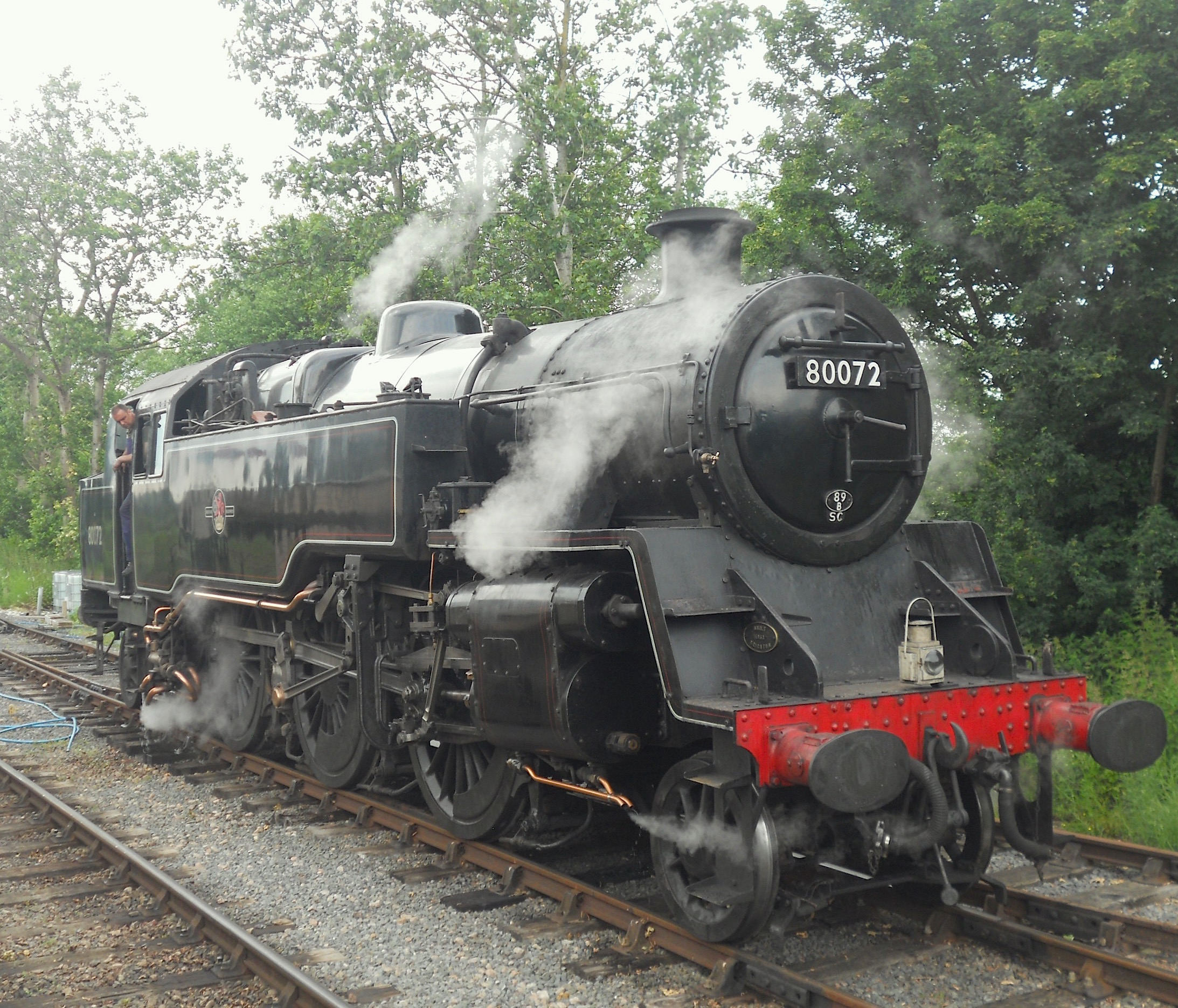
British Railways 2-6-4T Class Standard Four No. 80072 runs round its train at Ongar

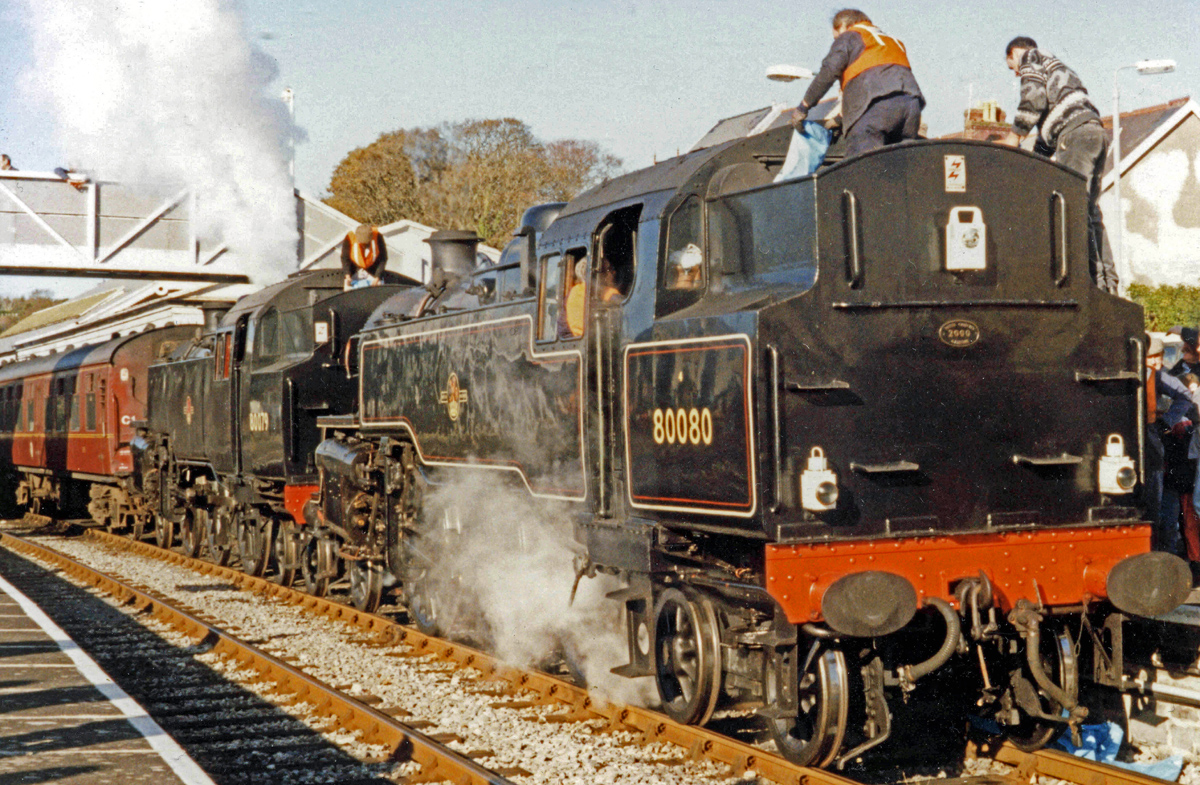
No 80079 and No 80080 at Tenby in October 1993 on a main line special from Swansea to Pembroke Dock and return.

80080 reversing at Ecclesbourne Valley Railway

Of the fifteen engines to survive into preservation, only one was purchased directly from BR and this was No. 80002, all the others being purchased from Barry Scrapyard. Of the fifteen engines to be preserved only two members of the class are yet to run in preservation, these being: 80100 and 80150. 80097 has recently been steamed in preservation and entered service in March 2019 following its restoration from scrapyard condition at the East Lancashire Railway. Five of them have also seen mainline operation: Nos. 80002, 80079, 80080, 80098 and 80135. 80002 operated over the former BR system in the 1970s when it appeared at an open weekend in Leeds arriving and returning home from the event under its own power. Three of the class were regular mainline performers around the '90s, with 80080 being originally used on LU 'Steam on the Met' trips. In 1991, steam was to return to the Folkestone Harbour branch with 80080 taking the train down from the mainline to the station at Folkestone Harbour and then for the journey back up to the mainline 80080 was used to bank West Country Pacific No. 34027 Taw Valley.

80080 became the first steam locomotive to work a normal stopping passenger service on the mainline in March 1993. It also returned to the Cambrian network in 1992. In 1994, 80079 joined up with 80080 to work a number of steam specials including a run over the Cambrian Coast Line.

In 1998, 80079 became the first steam locomotive to work a steam special down the Conwy Valley Line to Blaenau Ffestiniog since 1967.

80079 returned to Blaenau in 1999 with 80098.

80135 has been used on the Grosmont to Whitby workings for the North Yorkshire Moors Railway on the Esk Valley Line.

The Bluebell Railway had hoped to preserve No. 80154, the last steam locomotive to be built at Brighton Works, but this ultimately did not occur as the railway did not have the funds available.

=== Locomotives ===
Fifteen Class 4 tank engines have been preserved - the most of any BR Standard class. All were built at Brighton Works except 80002, which was constructed at Derby Works.

| Number | Builder | Built | Withdrawn | Service life | Location | Livery | Status | Image |
|---|---|---|---|---|---|---|---|---|
| 80002 | Derby Works | Nov 1952 | March 1967 | 14 years, 4 months | Keighley and Worth Valley Railway | BR Lined Black, Early Emblem | On static display in the Exhibition Shed at Oxenhope whilst awaiting a full overhaul. Boiler certificate expired in 2013. | |
| 80064 | Brighton Works | June 1953 | Sep 1965 | 12 years, 3 months | West Somerset Railway | BR Lined Black, Early Emblem | Boiler certificate expired in 1991. Gifted to the West Somerset Railway Association in 2023. | |
| 80072 | Brighton Works | Nov 1953 | July 1965 | 11 years, 8 months | Llangollen Railway | BR Lined Black, Late Emblem | | |
| 80078 | Brighton Works | Feb 1954 | July 1965 | 11 years, 5 months | Mid Norfolk Railway. | BR Lined Black, Early Emblem | Overhaul completed in 2017. | |
| 80079 | Brighton Works | March 1954 | July 1965 | 11 years, 4 months | Severn Valley Railway | BR Lined Black, Late Emblem | On static display at Barrow Hill Roundhouse whilst awaiting a full overhaul. | |
| 80080 | Brighton Works | March 1954 | July 1965 | 11 years, 4 months | North Norfolk Railway | BR Lined Black, Late Emblem | Overhaul completed in 2019. Owned by The Princess Royal Class Locomotive Trust. On 5-year loan to the North Norfolk Railway from May 2025. | |
| 80097 | Brighton Works | Dec 1954 | July 1965 | 10 years, 7 months | East Lancashire Railway | BR Lined Black, Early Emblem | | |
| 80098 | Brighton Works | Dec 1954 | July 1965 | 10 years, 7 months | Midland Railway - Butterley | BR Lined Black, Late Emblem | | |
| 80100 | Brighton Works | Jan 1955 | July 1965 | 10 years, 6 months | Bluebell Railway | N/A | Awaiting restoration from scrapyard condition. | Photograph showing a railway locomotive in scrapyard condition at Horsted Keynes station. |
| 80104 | Brighton Works | March 1955 | July 1965 | 10 years, 4 months | Tyseley Locomotive Works | BR Lined Black, Late Emblem | | |
| 80105 | Brighton Works | April 1955 | July 1965 | 10 years, 3 months | Strathspey Railway | BR Lined Black, Early Emblem | | |
| 80135 | Brighton Works | April 1956 | July 1965 | 9 years, 3 months | North Yorkshire Moors Railway | BR Lined Green, Late Emblem | | |
| 80136 | Brighton Works | May 1956 | July 1965 | 9 years, 2 months | North Yorkshire Moors Railway | BR Lined Black, Early Emblem | Overhaul completed in 2016. | |
| 80150 | Brighton Works | Dec 1956 | Nov 1965 | 8 years, 11 months | Mid Hants Railway | | Awaiting restoration from scrapyard condition. | |
| 80151 | Brighton Works | Jan 1957 | June 1967 | 10 years, 5 months | Bluebell Railway | | Overhaul completed in 2019. | |

== In fiction ==
Belle, a character from Thomas & Friends, is loosely based on this engine. The difference is that she has water cannons on top of her tanks (for a role as a fictional fire engine) and a large brass bell.

== Models ==
The Hornby Dublo range of 00 gauge model railways produced by Meccano Ltd released a model of the Standard 4 tank in 1954. This was Hornby's first entirely new postwar introduction. The model passed to Wrenn, and remained in their range until the 1990s.
