= NCC Class WT =

18 two-cylinder 2-6-4T locomotives in Northern Ireland

Northern Counties Committee Class WT
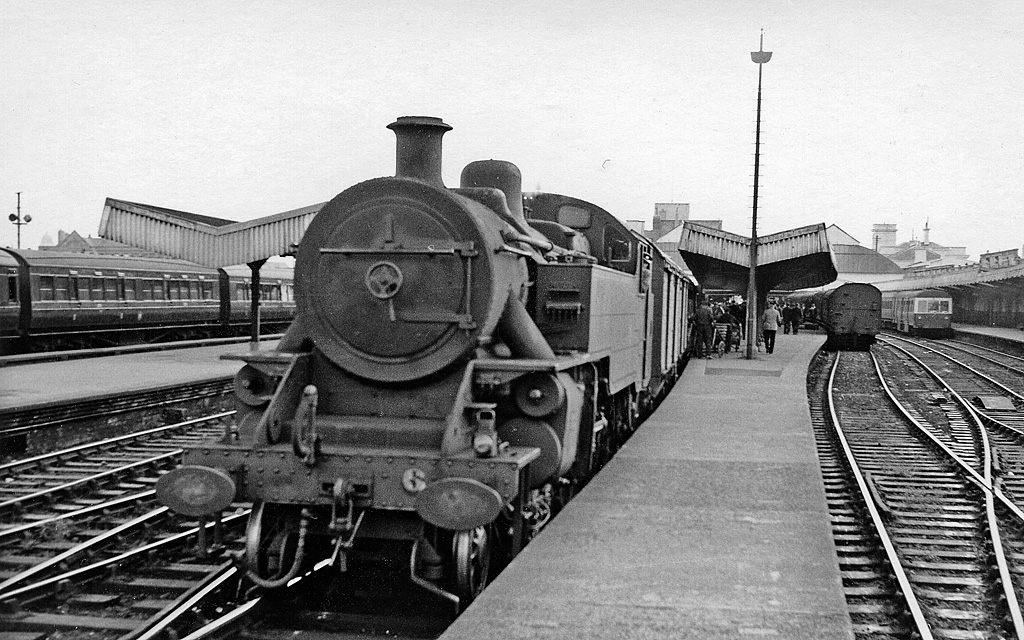
- No. 6 at Belfast York Road in August 1960
Type and origin
- Power type: Steam
- Designer: H. G. Ivatt
- Builder: LMS, BR, Derby Works
- Build date: 1946–1950
- Total produced: 18
Specifications
- Configuration
  - Whyte: 2-6-4T
  - UIC: 1′C2′ht
- Gauge: 5 ft 3 in (1,600 mm)
- Leading dia.: 37 in (0.940 m)
- Driver dia.: 72 in (1.829 m)
- Trailing dia.: 37 in (0.940 m)
- Wheelbase: 37 ft 9 in (11.51 m)
- Length: 46 ft 5 3/4 in (14.17 m)
- Width: 9 ft 3 in (2.82 m)
- Height: 13 ft 2 in (4.01 m)
- Axle load: 17.5 long tons (17.8 t; 19.6 short tons)
- Adhesive weight: 52.58 long tons (53.42 t; 58.89 short tons)
- Loco weight: 87 long tons (88 t; 97 short tons)
- Fuel type: Coal
- Fuel capacity: 3.5 long tons (3.6 t; 3.9 short tons)
- Water cap.: 2,500 imp gal (11,000 L)
- Boiler: G8AS
- Boiler pressure: 200 psi (1.38 MPa)
- Heating surface
  - Firebox: 129.75 sq ft (12.054 m^{2})
  - Tubes: 1,042 square feet (96.8 m^{2})
  - Total surface: 1,416.75 sq ft (131.620 m^{2})
- Superheater
  - Heating area: 246 sq ft (22.9 m^{2})
- Cylinders: Two (outside)
- Cylinder size: 19 in × 26 in (483 mm × 660 mm)
- Valve gear: Walschaerts
- Loco brake: Steam
- Train brakes: Automatic vacuum
Performance figures
- Tractive effort: 22,160 lbf (98.57 kN)
- Factor of adh.: 5.3
Career
- Operators: Northern Counties Committee (LMS); → Ulster Transport Authority; → Northern Ireland Railways
- Number in class: 18
- Numbers: 1-10, 50-57
- Nicknames: Jeep; Mogul tank
- Last run: April 1971
- Preserved: No. 4
- Current owner: RPSI

The NCC Class WT is a class of 2-6-4T steam locomotives built by the Northern Counties Committee's parent company, the London, Midland and Scottish Railway for service in Northern Ireland.

== History ==
UTA No.4 at York Road, Belfast on 9 June 1957

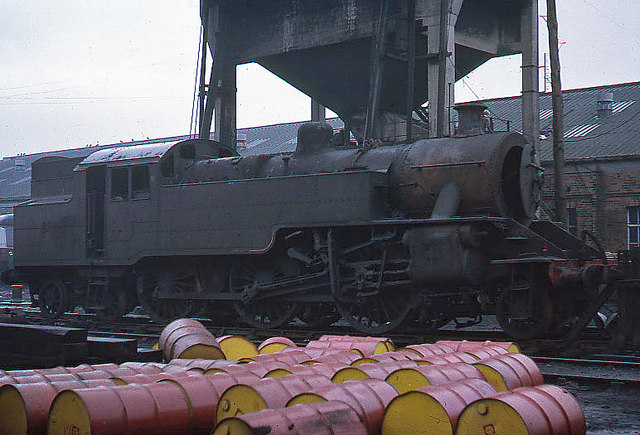
An unidentified WT at York Road.

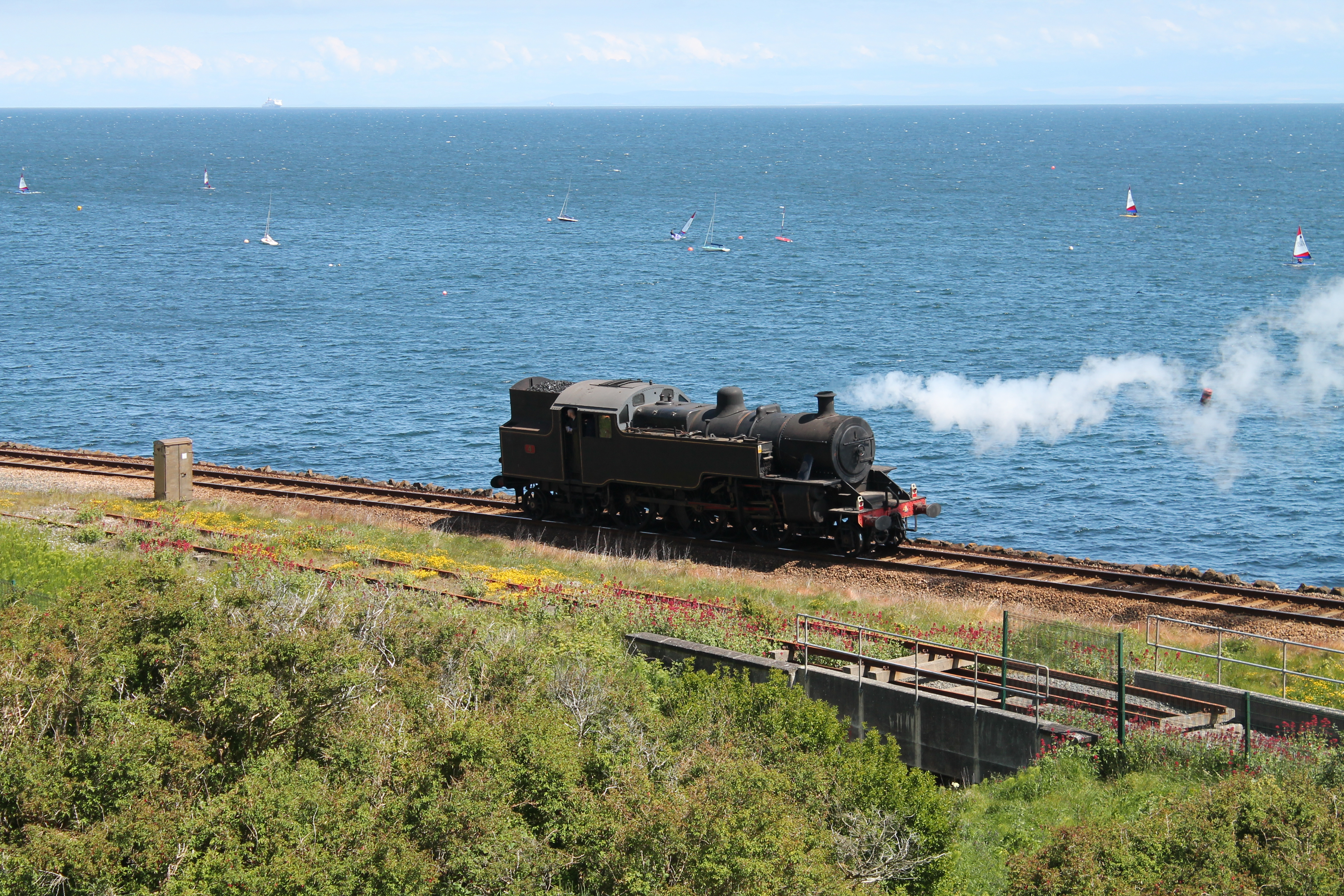
No. 4 on running-in trials at Whitehead in 2015

18 Class WT locomotives were built at Derby Works in England to the design of George Ivatt between 1946 and 1950, numbered 1–10 and 50–57. They were a tank engine version of the NCC Class W moguls. A tank engine did not require turning at termini and the LMS had produced a series of successful 2-6-4Ts. Like the LMS Fairburn 2-6-4T built at the same time, they had a hopper bunker and absence of plating ahead of the cylinders. They were based on the LMS Fowler 2-6-4T by Sir Henry Fowler. (Note: Mitchell describes the Class WT's true ancestry as the Class W mogul, and notes its less common oxymoron nickname of Mogul tanks points to this, though they were more commonly referred as Jeeps from once their operational flexibility became apparent.)

Their original duties included commuter services on the branch to Larne, operations to Portrush, and some services on the Belfast–Derry line via Coleraine. Following the transfer of lines from Great Northern Railway of Ireland to the Ulster Transport Authority they also seen use over those lines, particularly from Belfast to Dundalk and suburban services to Portadown. There was at least one example of use of an adapted tender to achieve an extended range between water refills.

In December 1962, locomotive No. 50 received a boiler from one of the ex-NCC 2-6-0 tender locomotives, the boiler and firebox being overhauled and repaired at Derby.

In early 1966 and towards the end of their careers, the Class WT locomotives were involved in working notable traffic. This was on spoil trains that transported fill for motorway construction from the Blue Circle cement works at Magheramorne to Greencastle near Belfast. Three trains of twenty hopper wagons each were made up, with a Class WT locomotive at each end. Each train when filled carried 600 long tons (610 t; 670 short tons) of rock and in all, some 7,600 trains had carried 4,250,000 long tons (4,320,000 t; 4,760,000 short tons) of material by the time the contract ended in May 1970.

The last of the Class WT locomotives were officially withdrawn in 1971, the last time one was in traffic being 22 October 1970. This made them the last steam locomotives in mainline operation in the British Isles; Córas Iompair Éireann steam in the Republic of Ireland having ended in 1962 and British Railways steam in Great Britain having finished in 1968.

== Preservation ==
Preserved No. 4 at Drogheda on 3 July 2004

One of these locomotives, No. 4, has been preserved by the Railway Preservation Society of Ireland (RPSI) following its withdrawal. The RPSI operates it on special mainline trains. It is not currently operational and is being overhauled.

No. 4 was one of seven that were converted to have an extended coal bunker in the mid-1960s to extend the range before needing refilling with coal. No. 4 went out of traffic in 2020 for remedial work, and has been dismantled for overhaul.

=== No. 58 Project ===
The RPSI was considering the possibility of building a new member of the class (No.58) to give them a second mainline tank locomotive considering the low availability of turntables on modern day lines. However, a NCC Class W Mogul is being built instead, due to the longer range between coaling and watering allowed by a tender engine.

== Technical details ==
The locomotives were built with many LMS standard features such as a self-cleaning smokebox, rocking firegrate, self-emptying ashpan, side window cab and a simplified footplate together with others which followed NCC practice, such as a water top-feed on a parallel boiler (as opposed to the taper boilers being used by the LMS at the time), Dreadnought type vacuum brake gear, Detroit sight feed cylinder lubricator and a cast number plate.

The locomotives were capable of over 70 miles per hour (110 km/h) and could be expected to use one ton of coal for every 40 miles (64 km).
