= LMS Fowler Dock Tank =

Class of dock shunting tank locomotives

LMS 2F Fowler Dock Tank
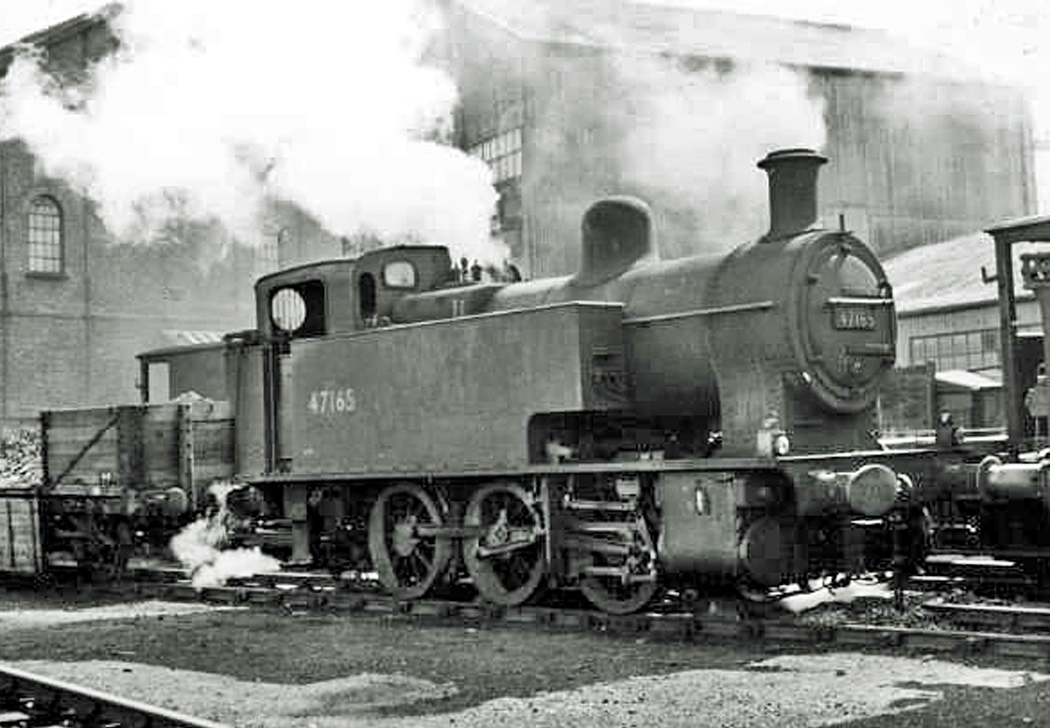
- LMS Fowler Dock Tank 47165 at Fleetwood Docks, Lancashire, on 6 August 1958
Type and origin
- Power type: Steam
- Designer: Sir Henry Fowler
- Builder: LMS Derby Works
- Build date: 1928–1929
- Total produced: 10
Specifications
- Configuration
  - Whyte: 0-6-0T
  - UIC: C n2tG
- Gauge: 4 ft 8 1/2 in (1,435 mm) standard gauge
- Driver dia.: 3 ft 11 in (1.194 m)
- Minimum curve: 2 1/2 chains (50 m; 165 ft)
- Wheelbase: 9 ft 6 in (2.90 m)
- Length: 27 ft 6 in (8.38 m)
- Loco weight: 43.6 long tons (44.3 t; 48.8 short tons)
- Fuel type: Coal
- Fuel capacity: 1.5 long tons (1.52 t; 1.68 short tons)
- Water cap.: 1,000 imp gal (4,500 L; 1,200 US gal)
- Firebox
  - Grate area: 14.5 sq ft (1.35 m^{2})
- Boiler: LMS type G5
- Boiler pressure: 160 lbf/in^{2} (1.10 MPa) saturated
- Heating surface
  - Firebox: 85 sq ft (7.9 m^{2})
  - Tubes: 923 sq ft (85.7 m^{2})
- Superheater: None
- Cylinders: Two, outside
- Cylinder size: 17 in × 22 in (432 mm × 559 mm)
Performance figures
- Tractive effort: 18,400 lbf (81.85 kN)
Career
- Operators: London, Midland and Scottish Railway; British Railways
- Power class: 2F
- Numbers: LMS: 11270–11279; 1934: 7100–7109; 1939: 7160–7169; BR: 47160-47169
- Withdrawn: 1959–1964
- Disposition: All scrapped

The London, Midland and Scottish Railway (LMS) Fowler Dock Tank was an 0-6-0T steam locomotive. Designed for shunting in docks, it had a short wheelbase in order for it to easily negotiate tight curves. The locomotives spent their entire lives painted in plain black.

== History ==
The LMS operated lines on a number of docks which due to space constraints contained curves considerably sharper than most other places, thus most dock tanks had only four coupled (i.e. driving) wheels in order to allow them to negotiate the tight curves.

== Design ==
With the growth in freight transport a more powerful engine was required, resulting in this design by Sir Henry Fowler: an 0-6-0T locomotive with a 9-foot-6-inch (2.90 m) wheelbase which, aided by the use of Cartazzi self-centring axleboxes on the rear axle, allowed the engines to negotiate curves of 2 1/2 ch (50 m; 165 ft).

== Construction ==
Ten members of the class were built on Lot 61 in 1928 and 1929 by Derby Works, although unusually for dock tanks they incorporated outside cylinders which was normally considered too dangerous in an area where people were working close to the track. Other than this they were typical of most dock tanks with simple slide valves and oval buffers.

== Numbering ==
They were initially numbered 11270–11279, renumbered under the LMS 1933 renumbering scheme to 7100–7109, and renumbered again in 1939 to 7160–7169. Despite the small class size, the LMS considered them standard locomotives. After nationalisation in 1948, British Railways added 40000 to their numbers making them 47160–47169, and allocated half the class to Scottish depots for use on branch lines as well as docks.

== Withdrawal ==
Withdrawals took place between 1959 and 1964 with all examples being scrapped.

Table of withdrawals
Year	Quantity in service at start of year	Quantity withdrawn	Locomotive numbers
1959	10	2	47162/69
1960	8	1	47167
1961	7	0	–
1962	7	2	47163/68
1963	5	3	47160–61/66
1964	2	2	47164–65
