= Furness Railway D5 Class =

Class of 19 British 0-6-0 locomotives

Furness Railway 1 class 0-6-0 Furness Railway Class D5 0-6-0
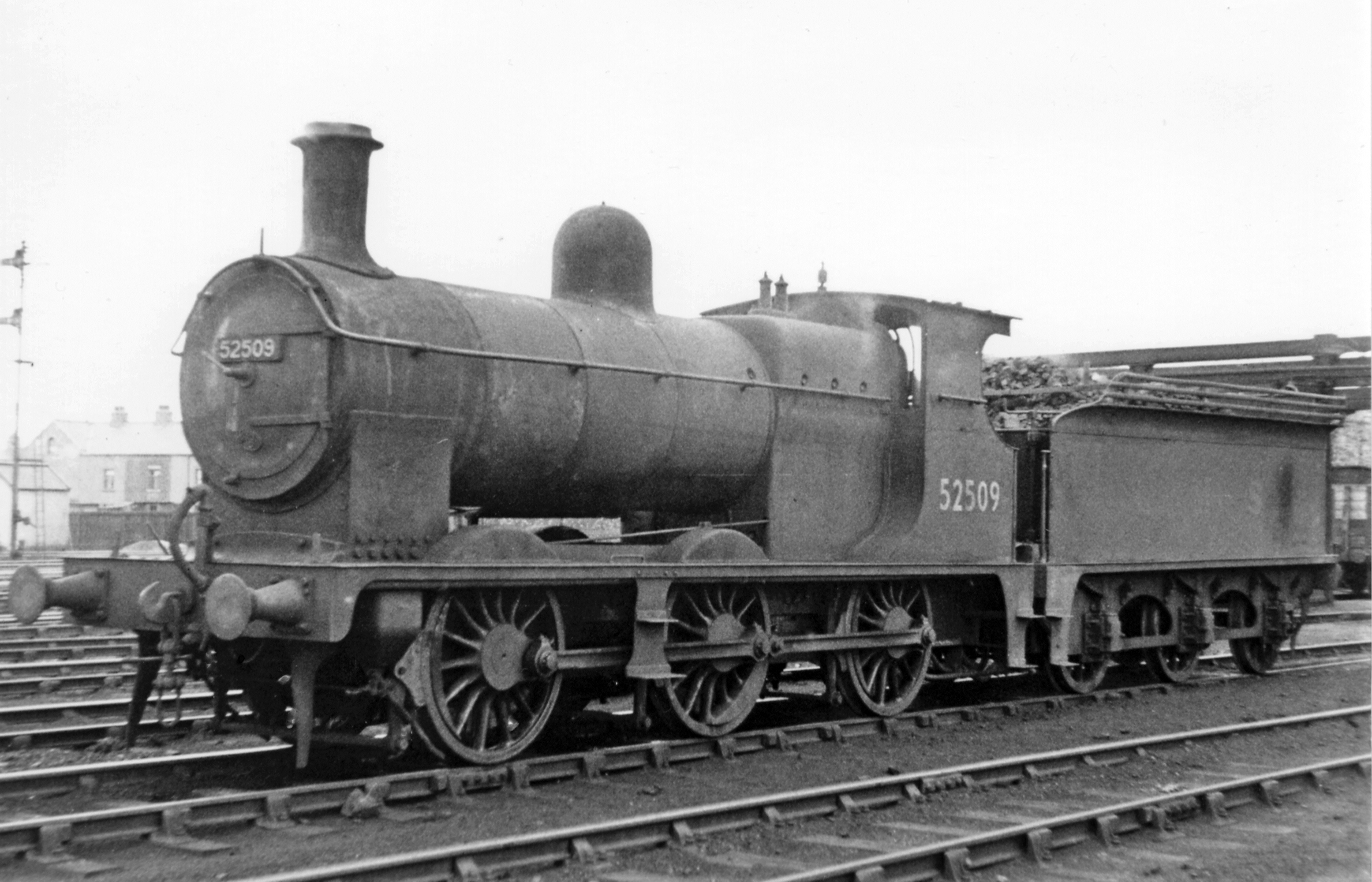
- D5 class No. 52509 0-6-0 at Workington Shed, 1951
Type and origin
- Power type: Steam
- Designer: W. F. Pettigrew
- Builder: North British Locomotive Co. (15), Kitson & Co. (4)
- Build date: 1913–20
- Total produced: 19
Specifications
- Configuration
  - Whyte: 0-6-0
  - UIC: C n2
- Gauge: 4 ft 8 1/2 in (1,435 mm)
- Driver dia.: 4 ft 7 1/2 in (1.410 m)
- Loco weight: 1913 batch: 42 long tons 13 cwt (95,500 lb or 43.3 t); Remainder: 44 long tons 17 cwt (100,500 lb or 45.6 t)
- Boiler pressure: 170 lbf (0.76 kN)
- Cylinders: Two
- Cylinder size: 18 in × 26 in (457 mm × 660 mm)
- Valve gear: Stephenson
Performance figures
- Tractive effort: 21,935 lbf (97.57 kN)
Career
- Operators: Furness Railway » London, Midland and Scottish Railway » British Railways
- Class: FR: 1 ("D5")
- Numbers: FR: 1–2; 19–35; LMS: 12494–12512; BR: 52494; 52499; 52501; 52508–52510
- Locale: London Midland Region
- Withdrawn: 1930–1935, 1950–1957
- Disposition: All scrapped

The Furness Railway 1 class 0-6-0 (classified "D5" by Bob Rush) was a class of nineteen 0-6-0 steam locomotives designed by W. F. Pettigrew and built between 1913 and 1920. Four were built by Kitson and Company and 15 by North British Locomotive Company (NBL). All 19 were assigned London, Midland and Scottish Railway numbers but only six survived long enough to be assigned a British Railways number.

== History ==
The Class D5 0-6-0 was the final development of the Furness Railway six-coupled goods engine. The class utilised the standardised 4-foot-7 1/2-inch (1.410 m) wheels and 18-by-26-inch (457 mm × 660 mm) cylinders of which W. F. Pettigrew had become a great proponent. To gain the extra traction, Pettigrew increased the boiler pressure to 170 lbf/in^{2} (1.17 MPa). from the 150 lbf/in^{2} (1.03 MPa) of the D3 and 160 lbf/in^{2} (1.10 MPa) of the D4.

== Construction ==
Initially only four were built but, during World War I, a further fifteen were added, all of which had boilers six inches longer than the first four, making them generally more capable but two tonnes heavier.

== Performance ==
The D5 was the largest and most powerful of the mineral engines on the Furness Railway and like many of the 0-6-0 class locomotives on the Furness Railway it was fitted with vacuum brakes and steam heating. This permitted it to be used on excursions and railtours.

== Numbering ==
FR No.	Manufacturer	Serial No.	Year	LMS No.	BR No.	Withdrawn
1	North British Locomotive	20073	1913	12494	52494	1956
2	North British Locomotive	20074	1913	12495	—	1932
25	North British Locomotive	20075	1913	12496	—	1932
26	North British Locomotive	20076	1913	12497	—	1935
27	North British Locomotive	20865	1914	12498	—	1932
28	North British Locomotive	20866	1914	12499	52499	1957
19	Kitson and Company	5195	1918	12500	—	1932
20	Kitson and Company	5196	1918	12501	52501	1957
21	Kitson and Company	5197	1918	12502	—	1930
22	Kitson and Company	5198	1918	12503	—	1930
23	North British Locomotive	21993	1918	12504	—	1932
24	North British Locomotive	21994	1918	12505	—	1930
29	North British Locomotive	21995	1918	12506	—	1930
30	North British Locomotive	21996	1918	12507	—	1935
31	North British Locomotive	22572	1920	12508	52508	1950
32	North British Locomotive	22573	1920	12509	52509	1956
33	North British Locomotive	22574	1920	12510	52510	1957
34	North British Locomotive	22575	1920	12511	—	1932
35	North British Locomotive	22576	1920	12512	—	1932

== Withdrawal ==
Withdrawals began in 1930 when four, Nos. 12502–03/05–06 were withdrawn. Six survived into BR service, being the only ex-Furness Railway locomotives to survive into BR ownership. The last three examples (BR Nos. 52499/501/510) were withdrawn in 1957 and none of the class were preserved.

Year	Quantity in service at start of year	Quantity withdrawn	Locomotive numbers	Notes
1930	19	4	12502–03/05–06	
1932	15	7	12495–96/98/500/04/11–12	
1935	8	2	12497/507	
1950	6	1	52508	
1956	5	2	52494/509	
1957	3	3	52499/501/510	
