= LMS locomotive numbering and classification =

A number of different numbering and classification schemes were used for the locomotives owned by the London, Midland and Scottish Railway (LMS) and its constituent companies.

The LMS, formed on 1 January 1923 from many smaller companies included the Caledonian Railway (CR), Furness Railway (FR), Glasgow and South Western Railway (GSWR), Highland Railway (HR), Lancashire and Yorkshire Railway (LYR), London and North Western Railway (LNWR), Maryport and Carlisle Railway (MCR), Midland Railway (MR), North London Railway (NLR) and North Staffordshire Railway (NSR) as well as the minor Cleator and Workington Junction Railway (C&WJR), Glasgow and Paisley Joint Railway (G&PJR), Knott End Railway (KER), Stratford-upon-Avon and Midland Junction Railway (S&MJR), and Wirral Railway (WR) and from October 1936 the Somerset and Dorset Joint Railway (S&DJR).

For information about individual classes and locomotives, see Locomotives of the London, Midland and Scottish Railway.

== Preceding schemes ==
=== London and North Western Railway ===
The LNWR inherited its numbering system from one of its constituents, the Grand Junction Railway. Locomotives were numbered in a series commencing at 1. No gaps were allowed in the series, so a new locomotive would either be numbered at the end of the series or would reuse the number of an older locomotive.

Older locomotives would then be either withdrawn or renumbered into the 'duplicate list' series used for those no longer in capital stock but which not yet completely life expired. These engines were numbered in various series over time: initially they took an 'A' suffix to the original number, then from 1862 they were renumbered above 1100, from 1870 above 1800, and from 1886 in the 3xxx series.

The GJR and LNWR also named their passenger tender locomotives (all locomotives were named until 1858), and often the same name and number combinations would be applied to new locomotives as they replaced older ones. The removal of names attached to freight engines after 1863 allowed them to be re-applied to the increasing stock of passenger engines, including those running on the former London and Birmingham Railway area of the LNWR, where locomotives had not been named.

=== Midland Railway ===
The MR undertook a wholesale renumbering of its locomotive stock in 1907 based on usage, wheel arrangement, power classification (see classification section below), and age, with locomotives of the same class numbered together. The least powerful and oldest classes took the lowest numbers and locomotives were renumbered in order of age.

When the London, Tilbury and Southend Railway (LTSR) was absorbed by the MR in 1912, its locomotives were renumbered into this scheme. It had only two tender engines, both 0-6-0 types, and these became 2898 and 2899. The rest were tank locomotives of varying wheel arrangements, which required the adoption of new number ranges at the end of the tank engine series. In all, the number ranges used by the MR were as follows:

Number range	Wheel arrangement	Power classification
1–1197	Passenger tender engines	
1–299	2-4-0	1
300–599	4-4-0	1 and 2
600–699	4-2-2	1 and 2
700–779	4-4-0	3
990–1197	4-4-0	4
1198–2199	Tank engines	
1198–1199	4-4-0 (Passenger)	Not classified
1200–1499	0-4-4T (Passenger)	1
1500–1599	0-4-0 (Freight)	0
1600–1999	0-6-0 (Freight)	1 and 3
2000–2099	0-6-4 (Passenger)	3
2100–2109	4-6-4 (Passenger)	Ex-LTSR
2110–2179	4-4-2 (Passenger)	Ex-LTSR
2180–2199	0-6-2 (Freight)	Ex-LTSR
2200 onwards	Freight tender engines	
2200–2239	2-6-0	2
2290	0-10-0	Not classified
2300–2899	0-6-0 (Double framed)	1 and 2
2900 onwards	0-6-0 (Single framed)	1 to 4

While the majority of ex-MR locomotives were left unrenumbered by the LMS at Grouping in 1923, the ex-LTSR locomotives were subject to several renumberings to clear space for new stock, which changed the number ranges set out above.

== Post-grouping numbering ==
Shortly after the LMS was formed in 1923, it developed a new numbering scheme for all the locomotives that it had inherited. The scheme dealt with two key problems faced by the new company:

- There were many locomotives with the same number, as each of the constituent companies had used a series starting at number 1
- Many of the constituent companies had numbered their locomotives in a somewhat random way, and the renumbering allowed for all locomotives in the same class to be given consecutive numbers and similar classes to be numbered in blocks

These advantages more than overcame the disadvantage of the effort involved in renumbering almost every locomotive and giving them a number that usually bore no relation to its pre-Grouping identity, except for the Midland Railway locomotives that had been renumbered along similar lines in 1907 and mostly retained their numbers.

The system comprised four groups of numbers into which locomotives from a set of railways were numbered:

Number range	Original owning company
1–4999	Midland Railway (including the London, Tilbury and Southend Railway, absorbed in 1912), North Staffordshire Railway and Stratford-upon-Avon and Midland Junction Railway
5000–9999	London and North Western Railway (including the North London Railway) and Wirral Railway
10000–12999	Lancashire and Yorkshire Railway, Furness Railway, Maryport and Carlisle Railway, Cleator and Workington Junction Railway and Knott End Railway
14000–17999	Caledonian Railway, Glasgow and South Western Railway, Highland Railway and Glasgow and Paisley Joint Railway

Within each group, locomotives were numbered in blocks which ran (low to high numbers) as set out below. Within each block, the least powerful locomotives took the lowest numbers.

Block description	MR etc. numbers	LNWR etc. numbers	LYR etc. numbers	Scottish numbers
Passenger tender locomotives	1–1199	5000–6399	10000–10599	14xxx
Passenger tank locomotives	1200–1499 / 2000–2219	6400–6999	10600–11199	15xxx
Freight tank locomotives	1500–1999 / 2220–2289	7xxx	11200–11999	16xxx
Freight tender locomotives	2290–4999	8xxx-9xxx	12xxx	17xxx

When the Somerset and Dorset Joint Railway locomotives were absorbed in 1930, they were mostly allocated numbers in the Midland Railway series (appropriate, since the SDJR had been jointly owned by the Midland Railway and many MR designs had been used on the SDJR), though some took numbers in the former LNWR series.

New-build LMS locomotives were not allocated any particular numbers, but were fitted into the most appropriate division. The unallocated 13xxx series of numbers were also used for new build LMS types.

=== 1932 renumbering ===
In 1932, as older locomotives had been withdrawn and new standard LMS designs were becoming more common, it was decided that modifications should be made to the numbering system. In short, all LMS-built locomotives were to have numbers in the 1–9999 series, with pre-Grouping locomotives being renumbered out of that series as required to accommodate them.

The introduction of this scheme involved renumbering both new and old locomotives to put them in the appropriate sequences. During the remainder of the 1930s, numbers were cleared for new locomotives by simply adding 20000 to the numbers of old locomotives.

Diesel shunters, which started to appear from the early 1930s onwards, were numbered in the same series as steam locomotives. Originally a series commencing at 7400 was planned, but it was soon evident that this would not provide sufficient space and it was replaced by a series commencing at 7050. The prototype mainline diesel locomotives, the first of which was introduced at the end of 1947 just prior to Nationalisation were given the 'significant numbers' 10000 and 10001.

==== Application by British Railways ====
New engines built by British Railways to ex-LMS designs after Nationalisation in 1948 continued to use this numbering system, albeit with 40000 added to the numbers to avoid number conflicts with other absorbed engines (see BR locomotive and multiple unit numbering and classification). There were some minor amendments made by BR, however:

- Former LMS diesel locomotives were numbered in the 10xxx series (mainline locomotives) and 12xxx series (shunters).
- Locomotives numbered above 20000 by the LMS were renumbered into the 58xxx series, in order to avoid number conflicts with ex-LNER locomotives.

== Classification ==
=== LMS system ===
The Midland Railway introduced a system of locomotive classification based on the power output represented by a locomotive's tractive effort at 50 mph (80 km/h) (passenger locomotives) or 25 mph (40 km/h) (goods locomotives). This is continuous tractive effort and is much lower than the starting tractive effort usually quoted in technical publications.

This system was adopted by the LMS and later British Railways in 1948. The classification was made up of a number (representing the power output - 0 being low power and 9 high power) and a letter (representing the type of work the locomotive was intended for), e.g. 4F. Over the years there were some modifications to the system, but the basics remained the same.

The principal downside with this method of classification was that it did not distinguish between particular classes of locomotive, so many very different types would have been classified '4F' for instance.

Power class	Minimum and maximum tractive effort (lbf)	
Power class	Passenger locos at 50 mph	Freight locos at 25 mph
0	Under 3,360 (used from 1928)	Under 6,385 (used from 1928)
1	3,360–4,479	6,385–8,064
2	4,480–5,599	8,065–9,744
3	5,600–6,719	9,745–11,424
4	6,720–7,839	11,425–13,104
5	7,840–8,959	13,105–14,784
6	8,960–10,079	14,785–16,464
7	10,080–11,199	16,465–18,144
8	11,200 and over	18,145 and over (used from 1937)
9	Not allocated	Used by British Railways from 1954

F
Freight (from 1928)
G
Goods (until 1928)
MT
Mixed traffic (freight and passenger)
P
Passenger
XP
Enhanced passenger (higher end of power range)

A single number without a suffix letter was originally used by the LMS on locomotives that were not of Midland Railway origin until 1928. Thereafter, it was used to indicate a mixed traffic locomotive. Where a mixed traffic locomotive fell into different power ranges, dual classification was used, e.g. 5P4F. From 1953 until 1957 (but remaining painted on locomotives until much later), the suffixes 'FA' and 'FB' were sometimes used to distinguish between freight locos with different load limits due to their braking characteristics on unfitted goods trains.
