= LMS 2-Cylindered Stanier 2-6-4T =

2-cylinder design for general service

LMS Stanier Class 4P 2-cylinder 2-6-4T
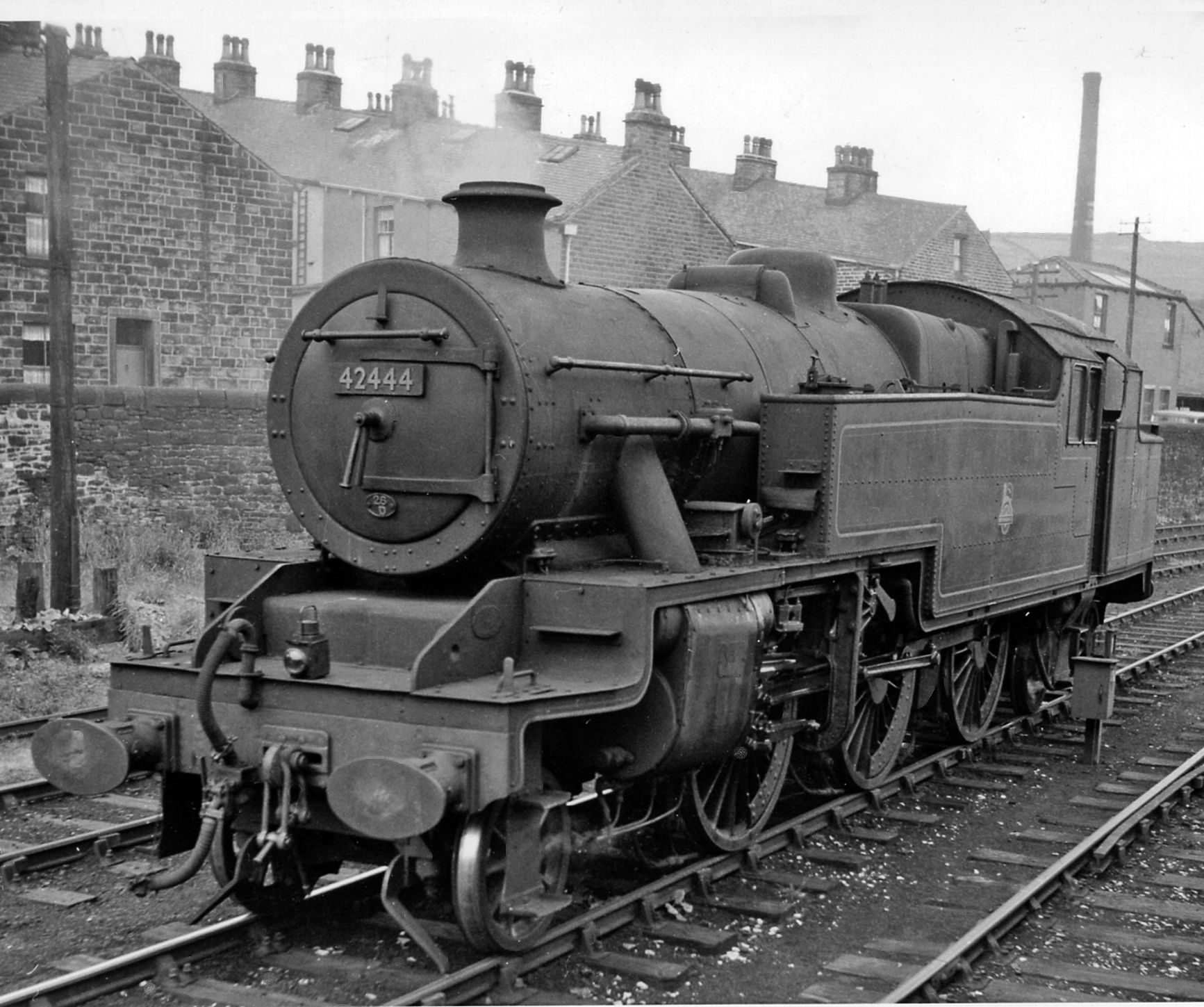
- 42444 at Bacup station, June 1959
Type and origin
- Power type: Steam
- Designer: William Stanier
- Builder: LMS Derby Works (133); North British Locomotive Co. (73)
- Build date: 1935–1943
- Total produced: 206
Specifications
- Configuration
  - Whyte: 2-6-4T
  - UIC: 1′C2′ h2t
- Gauge: 4 ft 8 1/2 in (1,435 mm) standard gauge
- Leading dia.: 3 ft 3 1/2 in (1.003 m)
- Driver dia.: 5 ft 9 in (1.753 m)
- Trailing dia.: 3 ft 3 1/2 in (1.003 m)
- Wheelbase: 38 ft 6 in (11.73 m)
- Length: 47 ft 2 3/4 in (14.40 m)
- Loco weight: 87.85 long tons (89.26 t; 98.39 short tons)
- Fuel type: Coal
- Fuel capacity: 3.5 long tons (3.6 t; 3.9 short tons)
- Water cap.: 2,000 imp gal (9,100 L; 2,400 US gal)
- Firebox
  - Grate area: 26 3/4 sq ft (2.49 m^{2})
- Boiler: LMS type 4C
- Boiler pressure: 200 lbf/in^{2} (1.4 MPa)
- Heating surface
  - Firebox: 139 or 143 sq ft (12.9 or 13.3 m^{2})
  - Tubes and flues: 1,126 or 1,223 sq ft (104.6 or 113.6 m^{2})
- Superheater
  - Heating area: 185 to 285 sq ft (17.2 to 26.5 m^{2})
- Cylinders: Two, outside
- Cylinder size: 19 5/8 in × 26 in (500 mm × 660 mm)
- Valve gear: Walschaerts
Performance figures
- Tractive effort: 24,670 lbf (109.7 kN)
Career
- Operators: London, Midland and Scottish Railway; → British Railways
- Power class: LMS: 4P; BR: 4MT
- Withdrawn: 1960–1967
- Disposition: All scrapped

Sir William Stanier's London, Midland and Scottish Railway (LMS) Class 4P 2-Cylinder 2-6-4T was a class of 206 steam locomotives built between 1935 and 1943.

== Numbering ==
numbers		Lot No.	date built	Built at
LMS	BR	Lot No.	date built	Built at
2425–75	42425–75	128	1937	Derby
2476–94	42476–94	128	1936	Derby
2537–44	42537–44	127	1935	Derby
2545–2609	42545–609	133	1936	North British 24301–365
2610–17	42610–17	133	1937	North British 24366–373
2618–51	42618–51	144	1938	Derby
2652	42652	144	1939	Derby
2653	42653	148	1940	Derby
2654–62	42654–62	148	1941	Derby
2663–70	42663–70	148	1942	Derby
2671/2	42671/2	148	1943	Derby

The LMS numbered them 2425–94, and then 2537–672, BR adding 40000 to their numbers to make them 42425–94, and then 42537–672. The LMS classified them 4P, BR 4MT. They were the basis for the LMS Fairburn 2-6-4T.

== Accidents and incidents ==
- On 15 August 1953, locomotive No. 42474 was hauling a passenger train which collided with an electric multiple unit that overran signals at Irk Valley Junction, Manchester, Lancashire. The junction is on a viaduct, and one of the carriages of the electric multiple unit plunged 40 feet (12 m) into the River Irk. Ten people were killed and 58 were injured.

== Film use ==
No. 2429 had a starring role as Celia Johnson's branch line engine in the 1945 film Brief Encounter, which was made at Carnforth station during the winter of 1944–45. The BR numberplate (42429) was sold at a BR auction held in the old Refreshment Room at Southport Chapel Street station.

== Withdrawal ==
The first withdrawal was in 1960, with the last in 1967. None have been preserved (though the original of the 3-Cylinder 2-6-4T version, number 2500, is preserved at the National Railway Museum, and two examples of the nearly identical LMS Fairburn 2-6-4T are also still in existence).

Table of withdrawals
Year	Quantity in service at start of year	Quantity withdrawn	Locomotive numbers
1960	206	2	42450/90.
1961	204	17	42427–28/38/67/71/75/79, 42539/45/49/52/70, 42627/35/37/48/69.
1962	187	43	42429/33/43/48/52/54/57/70/72–73/76/83, 42537–38/40–41/44/53/68/75–76/78–80/85/91/93/96/99, 42600/15/21/24/38/41–42/46/53/58/61/66/71–72.
1963	144	29	42425/40/58/66/69/80/85–87/91, 42543/47/56–57/61/63/71/82/92/95/98, 42603/17/32/36/43/55/59/68.
1964	115	51	42434/37/41/44–46/49/51/53/61/63/74/81/89/93, 42550–51/59–60/62/65/69/72–73/84/86/88–89/94, 42602/05/07–08/12/14/19–20/23/28–31/33/39–40/51–52/54/57/62/70.
1965	64	38	42426/30/32/35/39/42/47/56/59–60/64–65/68/77–78/82/85/92/94, 42542/54–55/58/64/66–67/90/97, 42601/04/09/18/26/34/45/49/60/67.
1966	26	11	42431/36/55/62/84, 42581/83, 42606/10/25/64.
1967	15	15	42546/48/74/77/87, 42611/13/16/22/44/47/50/56/63/65.

== Models ==
In 2008, Hornby Model Railways released Stanier's 4MT as a OO gauge ready-to-run model. Two versions were due to be released; one in LMS Black, the other in BR Black (early and late).

A pre-war O gauge model of this locomotive was produced by Marklin for Bassett-Lowke models in 1937; this continued in UK production by Winteringham until 1957. This model has been reproduced in O gauge by ACE Trains in 2009; both LMS and BR black versions have been manufactured.
