= LMS Fowler 2-6-4T =

Type of steam locomotive

LMS Fowler 4P 2-6-4T
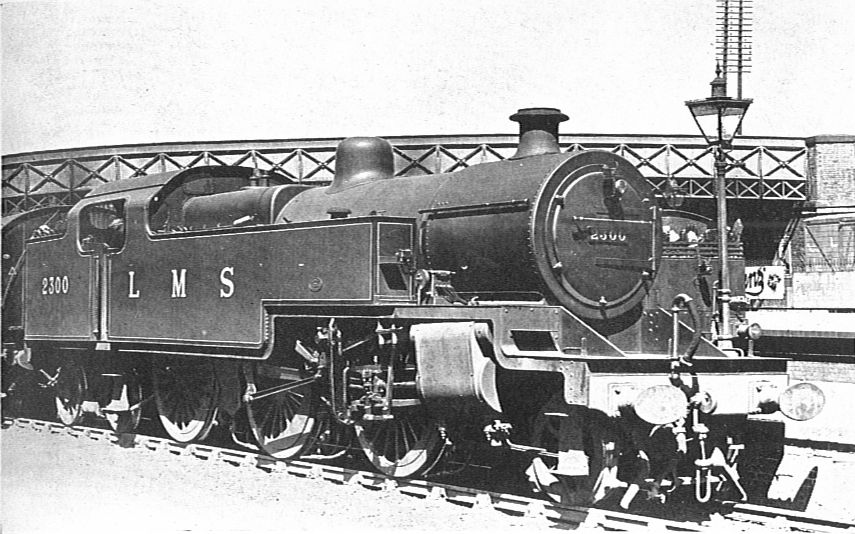
- 2300, circa. 1928
Type and origin
- Power type: Steam
- Designer: Sir Henry Fowler
- Builder: LMS Derby Works
- Build date: 1927–1934
- Total produced: 125
Specifications
- Configuration
  - Whyte: 2-6-4T
  - UIC: 1′C2′ h2pt
- Leading dia.: 3 ft 3 1/2 in (1.003 m)
- Driver dia.: 5 ft 9 in (1.753 m)
- Trailing dia.: 3 ft 3 1/2 in (1.003 m)
- Wheelbase: 38.5 ft (11.73 m)
- Length: 47 ft 2 3/4 in (14.40 m)
- Loco weight: 86.25 long tons (87.6 t; 96.6 short tons)
- Fuel type: Coal
- Fuel capacity: 3.5 long tons (3.6 t; 3.9 short tons)
- Water cap.: 2,000 imp gal (9,100 L; 2,400 US gal)
- Firebox
  - Grate area: 25 sq ft (2.3 m^{2})
- Boiler: LMS type G8AS
- Boiler pressure: 200 lbf/in^{2} (1.38 MPa) superheated
- Heating surface
  - Firebox: 138 sq ft (12.8 m^{2})
  - Tubes and flues: 1,082 sq ft (100.5 m^{2})
- Superheater
  - Heating area: 266 sq ft (24.7 m^{2}) or 246 sq ft (22.9 m^{2})
- Cylinders: Two, outside
- Cylinder size: 19 in × 26 in (483 mm × 660 mm)
Performance figures
- Tractive effort: 23,125 lbf (102.87 kN)
Career
- Operators: London, Midland and Scottish Railway; British Railways
- Power class: LMS: 4P; BR: 4MT
- Numbers: LMS: 2300–2424; BR: 42300–42424
- Withdrawn: 1959–1966
- Disposition: All original locomotives scrapped, new build planned.

The London, Midland and Scottish Railway (LMS) Fowler 2-6-4T was a class of steam locomotive passenger tank engine designed by Henry Fowler.

== Construction ==
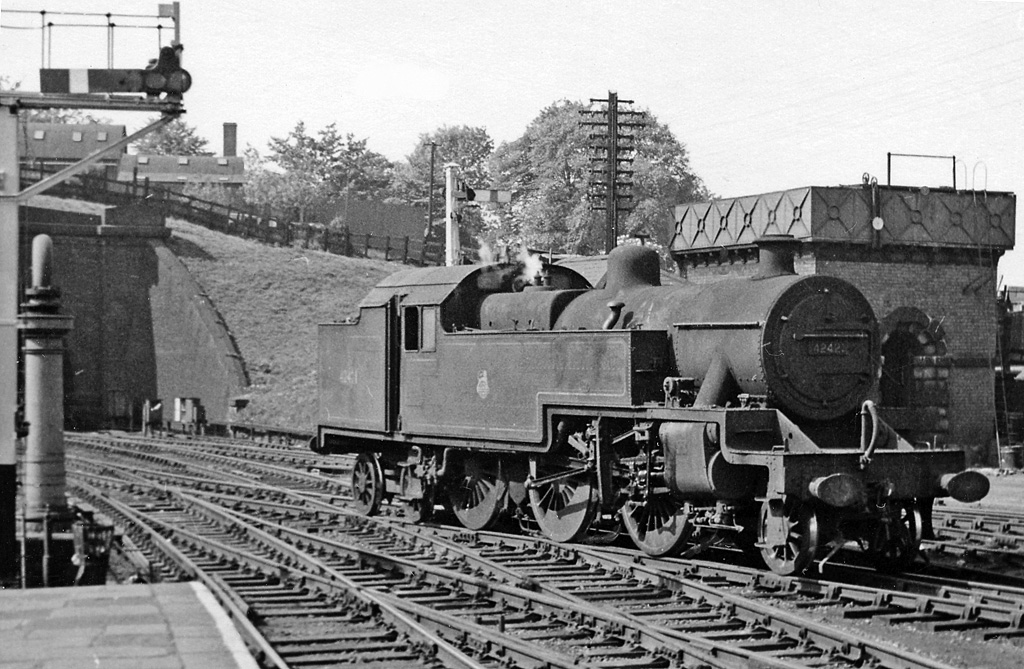
42421 at Hibel Road station in 1959 - this is one of the Fowler 4MTs with later style side window cabs.

125 examples of the class were built. The last 30 numbered 2395 to 2424 were fitted with side-windows and doors to their cabs. The LMS classified them 4P, BR 4MT. They were the basis for a family of subsequent LMS/BR Class 4 2-6-4T locomotives. The Irish Northern Counties Committee (NCC) Class W 2-6-0 moguls were also strongly influenced by this class, albeit the driving wheel diameter was three inches greater to match the NCC practice.

The cylinder and piston valve design and the setting of the Walschaerts valve gear, allowing a maximum travel of 6 3/8 inches (16 cm) in full gear, was believed by O. S. Nock to subsequently lead to the "outstanding success" of the class.

== Operational use ==
Most of the class were used on longer-distance commuter trains from stations in London, Manchester and other large towns. A number were allocated to Tebay Motive Power Depot and were used to bank heavy passenger and goods trains up the steep incline to Shap on the LMS West Coast Main Line. Some operated on the long trip from Shrewsbury to Swansea (Victoria). The last two surviving locos were withdrawn from service in 1966. 42389 was hauling the Tring to Euston commuter train that was hit in the rear at Harrow and Wealdstone on 8 October 1952 by a Perth to Euston express, causing the death of 112 people. 42389 was undamaged.

Despite having relatively small 5 feet 9 inches (1.75 m) driving wheels, the class was noted to reach speeds over 80 miles per hour (130 km/h) on outer suburban services to and from Euston.

== Numbering ==
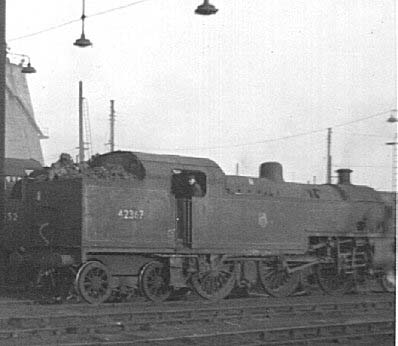
42367 at Willesden

The LMS numbered the class 2300–2424, BR adding 40000 to their numbers to make them 42300–424.

Table of orders
LMS no.	BR no.	Lot no.	Date built
2300–2303	42300–42303	47	1927
2304–2324	42304–42324	47	1928
2325–2374	42325–42374	53	1929
2375–2384	42375–42384	89	1932
2385–2423	42385–42423	101	1933
2424	42424	101	1934

== Preservation and revival ==
No locos were preserved, but the January 2013 edition of The Railway Magazine reported that a new-build project to recreate a Fowler 2-6-4T was at an initial research stage.

In May 2015, the LMS-Patriot Project announced that after the completion of Patriot Class No. 45551 The Unknown Warrior, it would begin construction on a new-build Fowler 2-6-4T. Similar to the Patriot, it will carry the number of the last member of the class, No. 42424, and be built to main line running standards, though it will only primarily be used on heritage lines.

One of the NCC Class WT locos (No. 4), which drew heavily from the Fowler design and were the last steam locomotives withdrawn in Northern Ireland, is preserved by the Railway Preservation Society of Ireland. In 2024 No. 4 was out of service and being dismantled before overhaul at the RPSI's Whitehead Railway Museum.
