= LMS Fairburn 2-6-4T =

British steam locomotive class (1945–1967)

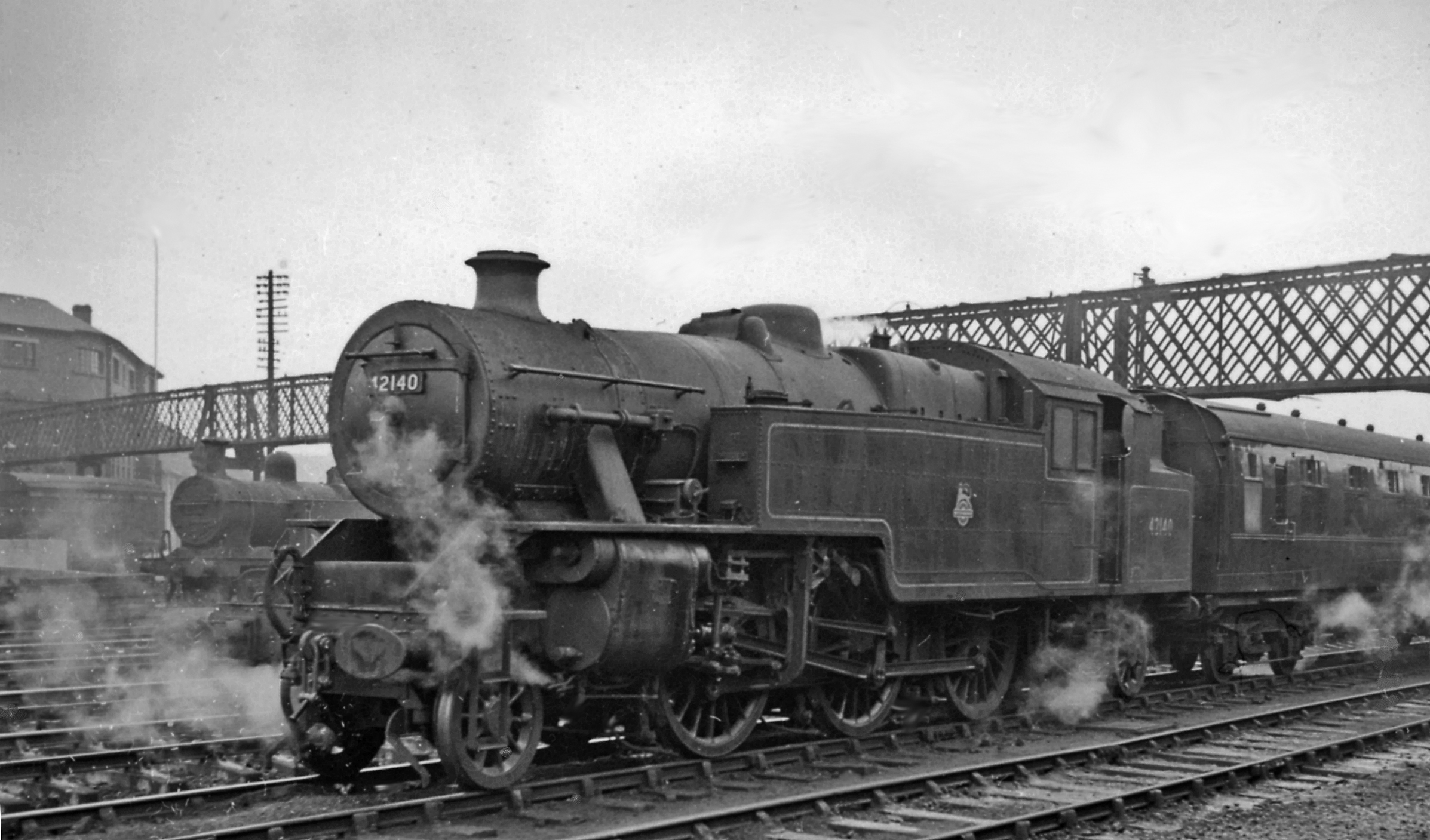
- 42140 at Derby
Type and origin
- Power type: Steam
- Designer: Charles E. Fairburn
- Builder: LMS & BR Derby Works; BR Brighton Works
- Build date: 1945–1951
- Total produced: 277
Specifications
- Configuration
  - Whyte: 2-6-4T
  - UIC: 1′C2′ h2t
- Gauge: 4 ft 8 1/2 in (1,435 mm) standard gauge
- Leading dia.: 3 ft 3 1/2 in (1.003 m)
- Driver dia.: 5 ft 9 in (1.753 m)
- Trailing dia.: 3 ft 3 1/2 in (1.003 m)
- Wheelbase: 37 ft 1 in (11.30 m)
- Length: 45 ft 9 3/4 in (13.96 m)
- Loco weight: 42050–42146: 84.70 long tons (86.06 t; 94.86 short tons) remainder: 85.25 long tons (86.62 t; 95.48 short tons)
- Fuel type: Coal
- Fuel capacity: 3.5 long tons (3.6 t; 3.9 short tons)
- Water cap.: 42050–42146: 1,875 imp gal (8,520 L) remainder: 2,000 imp gal (9,100 L)
- Firebox
  - Grate area: 26 3/4 sq ft (2.49 m^{2})
- Boiler: LMS type 4C
- Boiler pressure: 200 lbf/in^{2} (1.38 MPa)
- Heating surface
  - Firebox: 143 sq ft (13.3 m^{2})
  - Tubes and flues: 1,223 sq ft (113.6 m^{2})
- Superheater
  - Heating area: 230 sq ft (21 m^{2})
- Cylinders: Two, outside
- Cylinder size: 19 5/8 in × 26 in (498 mm × 660 mm)
- Valve gear: Walschaerts
Performance figures
- Tractive effort: 24,670 lbf (109.74 kN)
Career
- Operators: London, Midland and Scottish Railway; British Railways
- Power class: LMS: 4P; BR: 4MT
- Withdrawn: 1961–1967
- Disposition: Two preserved, remainder scrapped

The London, Midland and Scottish Railway (LMS) Fairburn Tank 2-6-4T is a class of steam locomotive. They were designed by Charles E. Fairburn for the LMS. 277 of these locomotives were built between 1945 and 1951, numbered in the range 42050–42186, (4)2187–(4)2299, (4)2673–(4)2699.

== Overview ==
This design was based on the earlier Stanier LMS Stanier 2-6-4T, which was derived from Henry Fowler's LMS Fowler 2-6-4T engine. Fairburn modified the design to have a shorter coupled wheelbase, reduced from 16 ft 6 in (5.03 m) to 15 ft 4 in (4.67 m) allowing curves of 5 chains to be negotiated; to reduce the locomotives mass per unit length the overall weight was reduced by 3 long tons 8 cwt (7,600 lb or 3.5 t).

It was also the basis for the later British Railways Standard Class 4 tank. They were used mainly for suburban passenger trains. Forty-one examples of the class were constructed by Brighton railway works for service on the Southern Region of British Railways in 1950 and 1951, replacing earlier designs. Of these, seven were transferred to the North Eastern Region between Spring 1952 and the end of 1954; the other 34 were exchanged for a like number of London Midland Region BR Standard Class 4 2-6-4T locomotives at the end of 1959.

| LMS No. | BR No. | Lot No. | Date built | Built by |
|---|---|---|---|---|
| — | 42050–065 | 210 | 1950 | Derby |
| — | 42066–078 | 3536 | 1950 | Brighton |
| — | 42079–095 | 3536 | 1951 | Brighton |
| — | 42096–106 | 3491 | 1950 | Brighton |
| — | 42107–132 | 202 | 1949 | Derby |
| — | 42133–146 | 202 | 1950 | Derby |
| — | 42147–182 | 196 | 1948 | Derby |
| — | 42183–186 | 196 | 1949 | Derby |
| 2187–89 | 42187–189 | 186 | 1947 | Derby |
| 2190–99 | 42190–199 | 186 | 1948 | Derby |
| 2200–17 | 42200–217 | 177 | 1945 | Derby |
| 2218–22 | 42218–222 | 177 | 1946 | Derby |
| 2223–64 | 42223–264 | 185 | 1946 | Derby |
| 2265–72 | 42265–272 | 185 | 1947 | Derby |
| 2273–99 | 42273–299 | 186 | 1947 | Derby |
| 2673–99 | 42673–699 | 177 | 1945 | Derby |

== Accidents and incidents ==
- On 19 April 1955, locomotive No. 42073 was in collision with V2 No. 60968 at Newcastle Central station, Northumberland. Both locomotives were derailed.

== Withdrawal ==
The class was withdrawn between 1961 and 1967.

Table of withdrawals
| Year | Quantity in service at start of year | Quantity withdrawn | Locomotive numbers |
|---|---|---|---|
| 1961 | 277 | 3 | 42217/20, 42683. |
| 1962 | 274 | 43 | 42088/94/97, 42111/17/22/30/44/46/62/64/72–73/75/91/93, 42203/05/07/11/15/19/23/27/37/48/54–55/57–58/68/72/76/90/98, 42674/77–79/84–85/87/92. |
| 1963 | 231 | 30 | 42063/67–68/91/98, 42100–01/20/36/40/51/57/66/78/80/82/88, 42206/28/31/38/53/70/79/81/88/93–94, 42681/98. |
| 1964 | 201 | 57 | 42054/56–57/59/77/84/89–90/92/99, 42123–24/26–27/35/37/43/48/53/63/67–68/71/85–86/90/92, 42200–01/08/18/21/26/29/34/39/42/44–46/50/56/61–63/75/78/80/82/84/86/91–92, 42682/86/95–96. |
| 1965 | 144 | 54 | 42050–51/53/60–62/64–65/70/75/82, 42103–04/06/09/12–14/18–19/29/31/39/47/55/58/60/65/70/74/79/94/98–99, 42202/09/12/14/22/30/41/43/47/59/65/85/89/95–96/99, 42673/75/80/88. |
| 1966 | 90 | 48 | 42058/69/74/78/87/95–96, 42102/05/07–08/10/15/21/25/28/32/42/50/56/59/61/69/76–77/81/83–84/95/97, 42204/13/16/25/32/40/49/60/64/66/71/73/77, 42676/90–91/93–94. |
| 1967 | 42 | 42 | 42052/55/68/71–73/76/79–81/83/85–86/93, 42116/33–34/38/41/45/49/52/54/87/89/96, 42210/24/33/35–36/51–52/67/69/74/83/87/97, 42689/97/99. |

== Preservation ==
Two of the Brighton-built locomotives have survived in preservation.

| Number | Builder | Built | Withdrawn | Service Life | Location | Owners | Livery | Condition | Photograph | Notes |
|---|---|---|---|---|---|---|---|---|---|---|
| 42073 | Brighton Works | Nov 1950 | Oct 1967 | 16 Years, 10 months | Lakeside and Haverthwaite Railway | - | BR Lined Black, Late Crest | Operational, boiler ticket expires: 2024 | | |
| 42085 | Brighton Works | Sept 1951 | Oct 1967 | 16 Years, 7 months | Lakeside and Haverthwaite Railway | - | BR Lined Black, Early Emblem (on completion) | Undergoing overhaul | | |

In its early days, 2085 carried Caledonian Railway blue livery, complete with an oval brass Caledonian number plate. This attractive livery was popular with the public, but strongly divided opinions in the preservation movement for its inaccuracy. At the same time, 2073 was painted in LNWR blackberry black, which was comparably anachronistic but generated less hostility as it did at least resemble the original livery.

== Models ==
Bachmann produces a 00 Gauge model of the Fairburn 4MT in LMS Black as well as early and late BR, numbered as 42073. Bachmann (Graham Farish) also produces several N gauge variants: 2691 in LMS black, 42096 (early BR black), and 42073 (late BR black).

ACE Trains have produced an O-gauge model of 2085 in its early-preservation Caledonian Railway blue livery, although the model is actually of a Stanier designed 2-6-4T.
