= LMS 3-Cylindered Stanier 2-6-4T =

Class of steam locomotives

LMS Stanier Class 4P 3-cylinder 2-6-4T
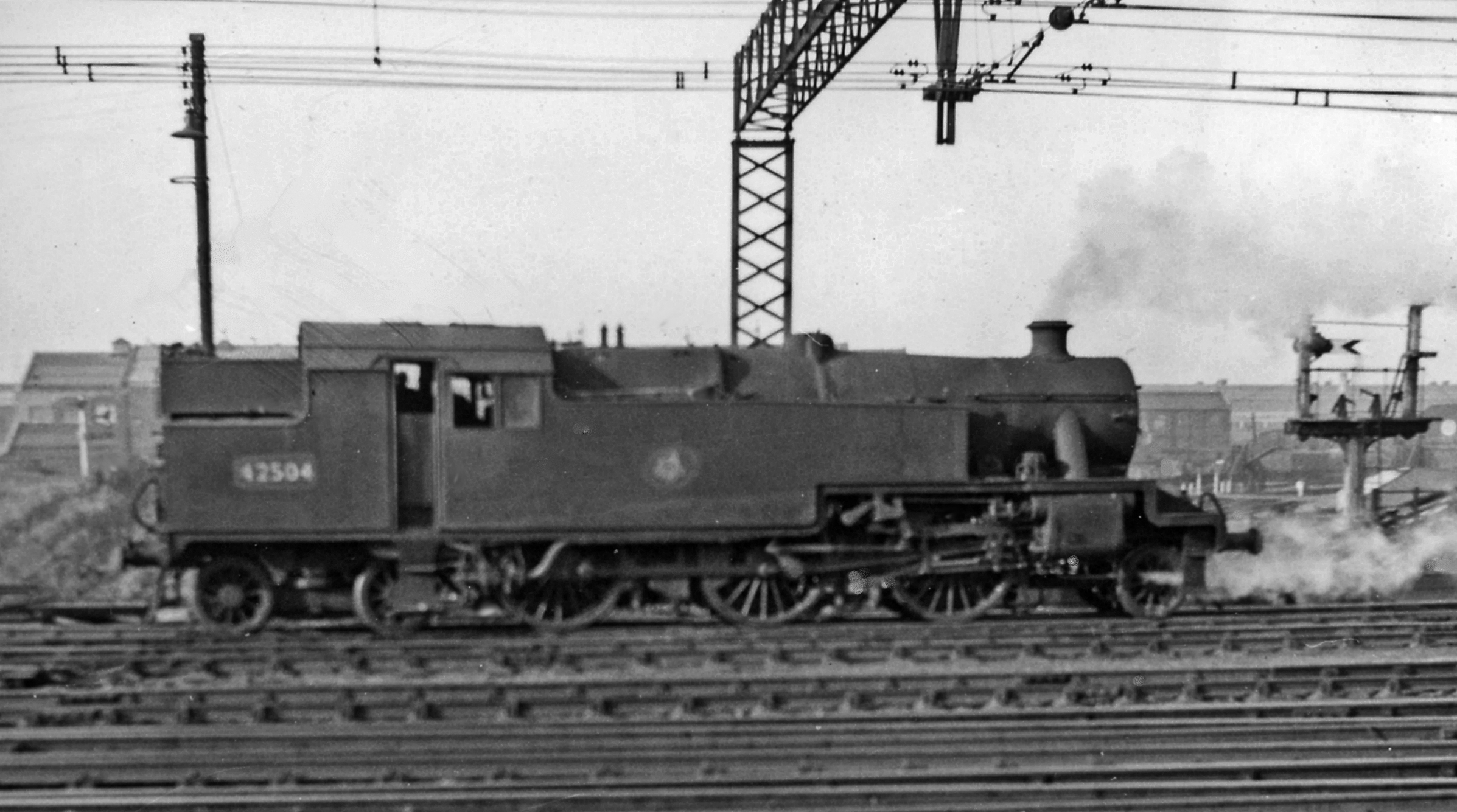
- 42504 at Stratford, November 1961
Type and origin
- Power type: Steam
- Designer: William Stanier
- Builder: LMS Derby Works
- Build date: 1934
- Total produced: 37
Specifications
- Configuration
  - Whyte: 2-6-4T
  - UIC: 1′C2′ h3tb
- Gauge: 4 ft 8 1/2 in (1,435 mm) standard gauge
- Leading dia.: 3 ft 3 1/2 in (1.003 m)
- Driver dia.: 5 ft 9 in (1.753 m)
- Trailing dia.: 3 ft 3 1/2 in (1.003 m)
- Wheelbase: 38 ft 6 in (11.73 m)
- Length: 47 ft 2 3/4 in (14.40 m)
- Width: 8 ft 11 1/2 in (2.73 m)
- Height: 12 ft 10 1/2 in (3.92 m)
- Loco weight: 92.25 long tons (93.73 t; 103.32 short tons)
- Fuel type: Coal
- Fuel capacity: 3.50 long tons (3.56 t; 3.92 short tons)
- Water cap.: 2,000 imp gal (9,100 L; 2,400 US gal)
- Firebox
  - Grate area: 25 sq ft (2.3 m^{2})
- Boiler: LMS type 4C
- Boiler pressure: 200 lbf/in^{2} (1.4 MPa)
- Heating surface
  - Firebox: 137 sq ft (12.7 m^{2})
  - Tubes and flues: 1,011 sq ft (93.9 m^{2})
- Superheater
  - Heating area: 160 to 154 sq ft (14.9 to 14.3 m^{2})
- Cylinders: Three
- Cylinder size: 16 in × 26 in (406 mm × 660 mm)
Performance figures
- Tractive effort: 24,600 lbf (109.43 kN)
Career
- Operators: London, Midland and Scottish Railway; → British Railways
- Power class: LMS: 4P; BR: 4MT
- Numbers: LMS 2500–2536; BR 42500–42536
- Withdrawn: 1960–1962
- Disposition: One preserved, remainder scrapped

The LMS Stanier Class 4P 3-Cylinder 2-6-4T is a class of steam locomotives designed for work over the London, Tilbury and Southend Railway route. All 37 were built in 1934 at Derby Works and were numbered 2500–2536. The third cylinder was provided to allow increased acceleration between the many stops on the L.T.&S.R. line. From 1935 the LMS switched to constructing a very similar, albeit simpler, 2-cylinder design.

== Production ==
The 37 three-cylinder express passenger tank locomotives were designed specifically for the London Tilbury and Southend line of the London Midland & Scottish railway (LMS) where extra power was needed to operate the heavy outer suburban trains to tight schedules. The inside cylinder and valve gear created additional maintenance and was deemed unnecessary for other duties. The locomotives were built in 1934 at LMS Derby Works.

Table of orders
numbers		Lot No.	date built	Built at
LMS	BR	Lot No.	date built	Built at
2500–04	42500–04	102	1934	Derby
2505–36	42505–36	116	1934	Derby

== Withdrawal ==
The class were withdrawn from 1960 to 1962.

Table of withdrawals
Year	Quantity in service at start of year	Quantity withdrawn	Locomotive numbers
1960	37	1	42512.
1961	36	7	42506–07/10/21/24/31/34.
1962	29	29	42500–05/08–09/11/13–20/22–23/25–30/32–33/35–36.

== Preservation ==
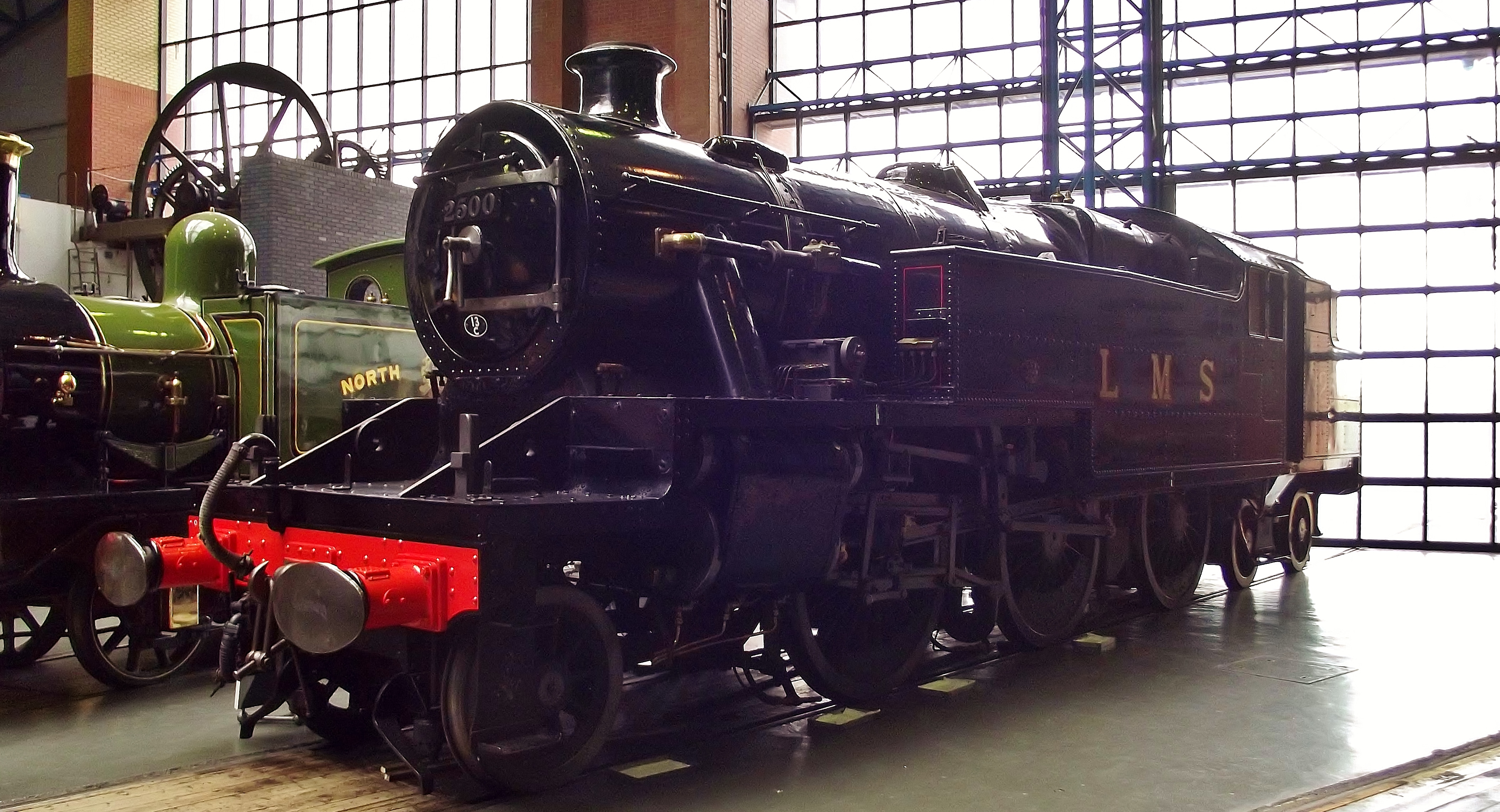
LMS 2500 displayed at the National Railway Museum, York, April 2013

No. 2500, the first of the class to be built, has been preserved on static display at the National Railway Museum in York in LMS lined black livery. It was loaned to Bury Transport Museum in December 2023.
