= LMS Ivatt Class 2 2-6-2T =

Class of steam locomotives

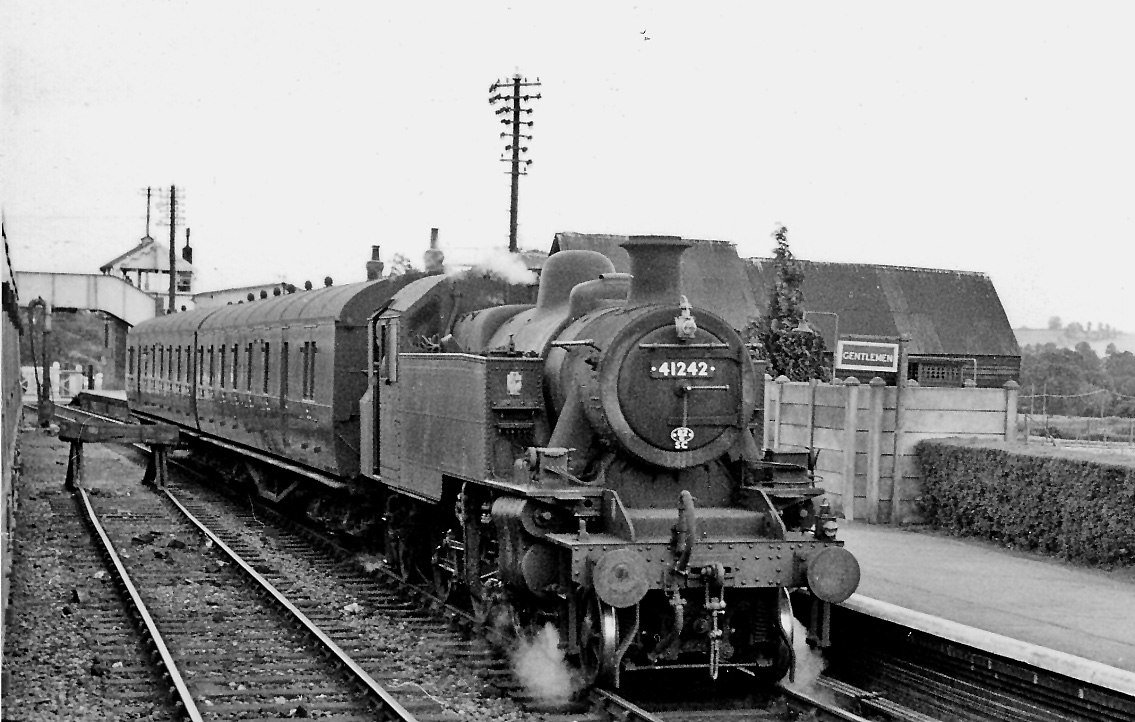
- 41242 at Evercreech Junction in 1962
Type and origin
- Power type: Steam
- Designer: H. G. Ivatt
- Builder: LMS & BR Crewe Works; BR Derby Works
- Build date: 1946–1952
- Total produced: 130
Specifications
- Configuration
  - Whyte: 2-6-2T
  - UIC: 1′C1′ h2t
- Gauge: 4 ft 8 1/2 in (1,435 mm) standard gauge
- Leading dia.: 3 ft 0 in (0.914 m)
- Driver dia.: 5 ft 0 in (1.524 m)
- Trailing dia.: 3 ft 0 in (0.914 m)
- Wheelbase: 30 ft 3 in (9.22 m)
- Length: 38 ft 9 1/2 in (11.82 m)
- Loco weight: 63.25 long tons (64.3 t; 70.8 short tons); 41290–41329: 65.20 long tons (66.2 t; 73.0 short tons)
- Fuel type: Coal
- Fuel capacity: 3 long tons (3.05 t; 3.36 short tons)
- Water cap.: 1,350 imp gal (6,100 L; 1,620 US gal)
- Firebox
  - Grate area: 17.5 sq ft (1.63 m^{2})
- Boiler: LMS type 7
- Boiler pressure: 200 lbf/in^{2} (1.38 MPa)
- Heating surface
  - Firebox: 101 sq ft (9.4 m^{2})
  - Tubes and flues: 924 sq ft (85.8 m^{2})
- Superheater
  - Heating area: 134 sq ft (12.4 m^{2}) or 124 sq ft (11.5 m^{2})
- Cylinders: Two, outside
- Cylinder size: 16 in × 26 in (406 mm × 660 mm)
Performance figures
- Tractive effort: 17,400 lbf (77.40 kN)
Career
- Operators: London, Midland and Scottish Railway; British Railways
- Power class: LMS: 2P; BR: 2MT; BR (SR): 2P/2FA
- Nicknames: Mickey Mouse Tanks
- Axle load class: BR: Route Availability 1
- Withdrawn: 1962–1967
- Disposition: Four preserved, remainder scrapped

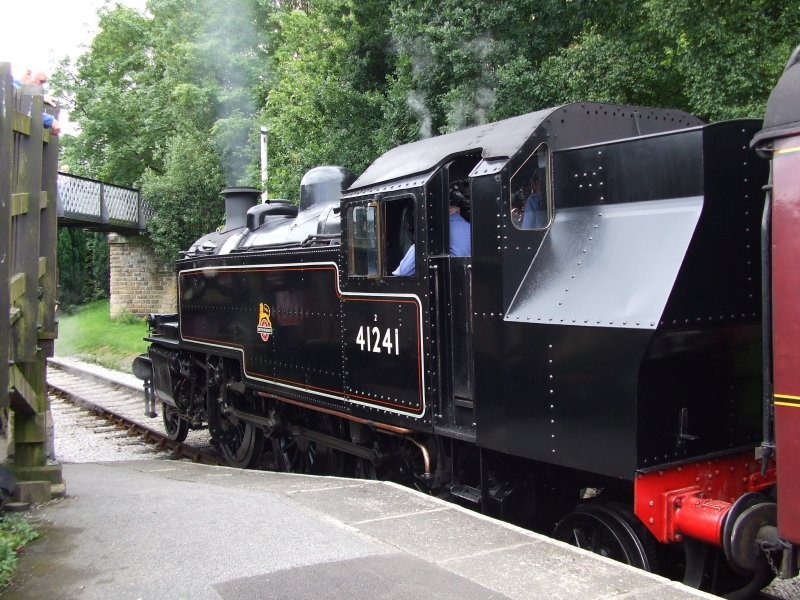
41241 from the rear, showing the shape of the bunker

The London, Midland and Scottish Railway (LMS) Ivatt Class 2 2-6-2T is a class of light 'mixed-traffic' steam locomotive introduced in 1946.

== Background ==
The LMS had various elderly tank engines and the operating department required a new small class 2 locomotive to replace them. Noting that the Great Western Railway 4500 and 4575 Classes of 2-6-2T ('Prairie') had been successful, George Ivatt designed the new engine type incorporating self-emptying ashpans and rocking grates which were labour-saving devices. A tender version, the Ivatt Class 2 2-6-0 was also produced. The LMS classified them as 2P, but BR preferred the classification 2MT.

== Construction ==
The class was introduced between 1946 and 1952. They were based on the LMS Stanier 2-6-2T which was, in turn, based on the LMS Fowler 2-6-2T. Ten were built by the LMS before nationalisation in 1948, and were numbered 1200–1209. British Railways added the prefix '4' to their numbers so they became 41200–41209. A further 120 were built by BR, numbers 41210–41329. Most were built at Crewe, including 41272 — the 7000th locomotive to be built there, but the last ten were built at Derby. Fifty engines were fitted with push-pull equipment, these being Nos. 41210–41229, 41270–41289 and 41320–41329.

Table of orders
Number		Date	Lot no.	Built at	Notes
LMS	BR	Date	Lot no.	Built at	Notes
1200–08	41200–08	1946	181	Crewe	
1209	41209	1947	181	Crewe	
—	41210–20	1948	195	Crewe	Push-pull fitted
—	41221–29	1948	195	Crewe	41222 was push-pull fitted. It was used on the Newport Pagnell branch until its closure in 1964.
—	41230–59	1949	204	Crewe	
—	41260–69	1950	209	Crewe	
—	41270–89	1950	209	Crewe	Push-pull fitted
—	41290–99	1951	225	Crewe	
—	41300–19	1952	225	Crewe	
—	41320–29	1952	225	Derby	Push-pull fitted

== Service ==
The last thirty Crewe-built engines, 41290–41319, were allocated to the Southern Region from new. The rest were London Midland Region engines. Some were also allocated to the Western Region of BR in the 1950s and 1960s such as numbers 41202, 41203 and 41249 which were shedded at Bristol Bath Road in 1959. They spent their lives mostly on branch line work.

The design formed the basis for the BR Standard Class 2 2-6-2T (numbers 84000–29), which were built to a slightly smaller loading gauge and so have slanted cab sides. These engines also incorporate a fallplate and fittings common to many BR standard classes, such as the chimneys.

In 1957, No. 41224 hauled the first train to pass along the old Stafford and Uttoxeter Railway since closure six years earlier, and the last before the track was dismantled. It was chartered by the Midland area of the Stephenson Locomotive Society and carried more than 220 railway enthusiasts.

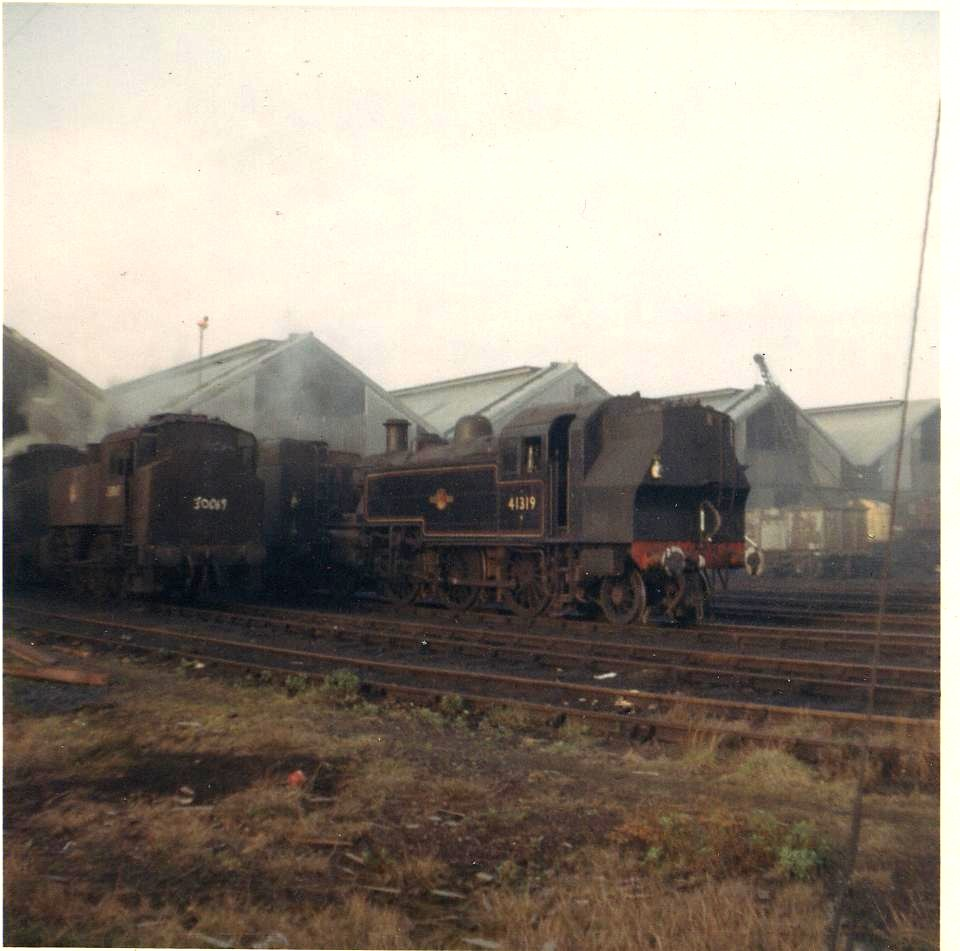
One of the S.R. examples, 41319 at Eastleigh shed in February 1967

== Withdrawal ==
The class were withdrawn between 1962 and 1967.

Table of withdrawals
Year	Quantity in service at start of year	Quantity withdrawn	Locomotive numbers
1962	130	21	41235–36/46–47/52/54–59/63/65–67/69/71/77–78/80/88.
1963	109	18	41203/13/40/45/50/73–74/76/79/81–82/89/92/97, 41302/06/09/18.
1964	91	26	41205/10/25–28/31/37/39/43/53/60/62/68, 41300/03/10–11/15/17/22–23/26–29.
1965	65	26	41200–01/08–09/12/14–15/18–19/21/32/38/42–43/61/70/72/75/93, 41305/08/13–14/21/24–25.
1966	39	31	41202/04/06–07/11/16–17/20/22–23/29/33–34/41/44/49/51/64/83/85–87/90–91/94/96/99, 41301/04/07/16.
1967	8	8	41224/30/84/95/98, 41312/19–20.

== Preservation ==
Four engines have survived to preservation: 41241, 41298, 41312 and 41313, all being Crewe-built examples. All four have steamed in preservation, with 41241 & 41312 working on the main line. 41241 appeared at the Rail 150 Cavalcade at Shildon in 1975, having arrived at the event under its own power. It was also used on the Shildon shuttle trains during the event taking people from the main station at Shildon to the event and also between Darlington and Shildon. 41312 ran on the main line in the late 1990s and early 2000s. As of 2018, all four preserved engines were operational, the latest of them being 41241, which returned to service from an overhaul in June during the K&WVR's 50th anniversary steam gala.

No. 41241 is particularly associated with the Keighley & Worth Valley Railway and when initially preserved was painted in a fictitious maroon livery with K&WVR on the tanks, though it was later restored to more conventional BR black.

During October 2006, the Ivatt Trust loaned the unrestored No. 41313 to the Isle of Wight Steam Railway. In October 2014, it was announced that the engine will be moved to the East Somerset Railway for overhaul. No. 41298 was also moved to the Isle of Wight, and ownership of both these locos was transferred to the Isle of Wight Steam Railway. These locomotives required conversion/fitment of air braking alongside the vacuum brakes as the rolling stock on the island is air-braked. All of the engines apart from 41241 wear authentic British Railways lined black livery with the later BR crest. 41241 presently wears the livery that it wore when the Keighley and Worth Valley Railway was opened in 1968, at the time it wasn't able to wear BR colours.

Number	Built	Withdrawn	Location	Condition	Dual Braked	Livery	Photograph	Notes
41241	Sept 1949	Dec 1966	Keighley and Worth Valley Railway	Operational, Boiler ticket expires: 2027.	No	K&WVR Maroon		Returned to service in June 2018 during the KWVR's 50th anniversary gala.
41298	Oct 1951	Jul 1967	Isle of Wight Steam Railway	Operational, Boiler ticket expires: 2025.	Yes	BR Lined Black, Late Crest		Returned to steam in September 2015 for the first time in preservation. Fitted with air brakes for operation on the Isle of Wight.
41312	May 1952	Jul 1967	Mid-Hants Railway	Operational, Boiler ticket expires: 2027.	No	BR Lined Black, Late Crest		Returned to steam following an overhaul in January 2016
41313	May 1952	Oct 1965	Isle of Wight Steam Railway	Operational, Boiler ticket expires: 2027.	Yes	BR Lined Black, Late Crest		Restored by the East Somerset Railway for the Isle of Wight Steam Railway. Returned to service in June 2017. Fitted with air brakes for operation on the Isle of Wight.

== Models ==
Bachmann produced a 00 gauge model in various liveries. Dapol have released a model in British N gauge.

== In Fiction ==
Arthur from Thomas & Friends is based on this class, only appearing between 2003 and 2008. Concept art of the character has him with the same number as No. 41241 of the Keighley & Worth Valley Railway, although he has no number in the show.
