= LMS Ivatt Class 2 2-6-0 =

Class of British steam locomotives (1946–67)

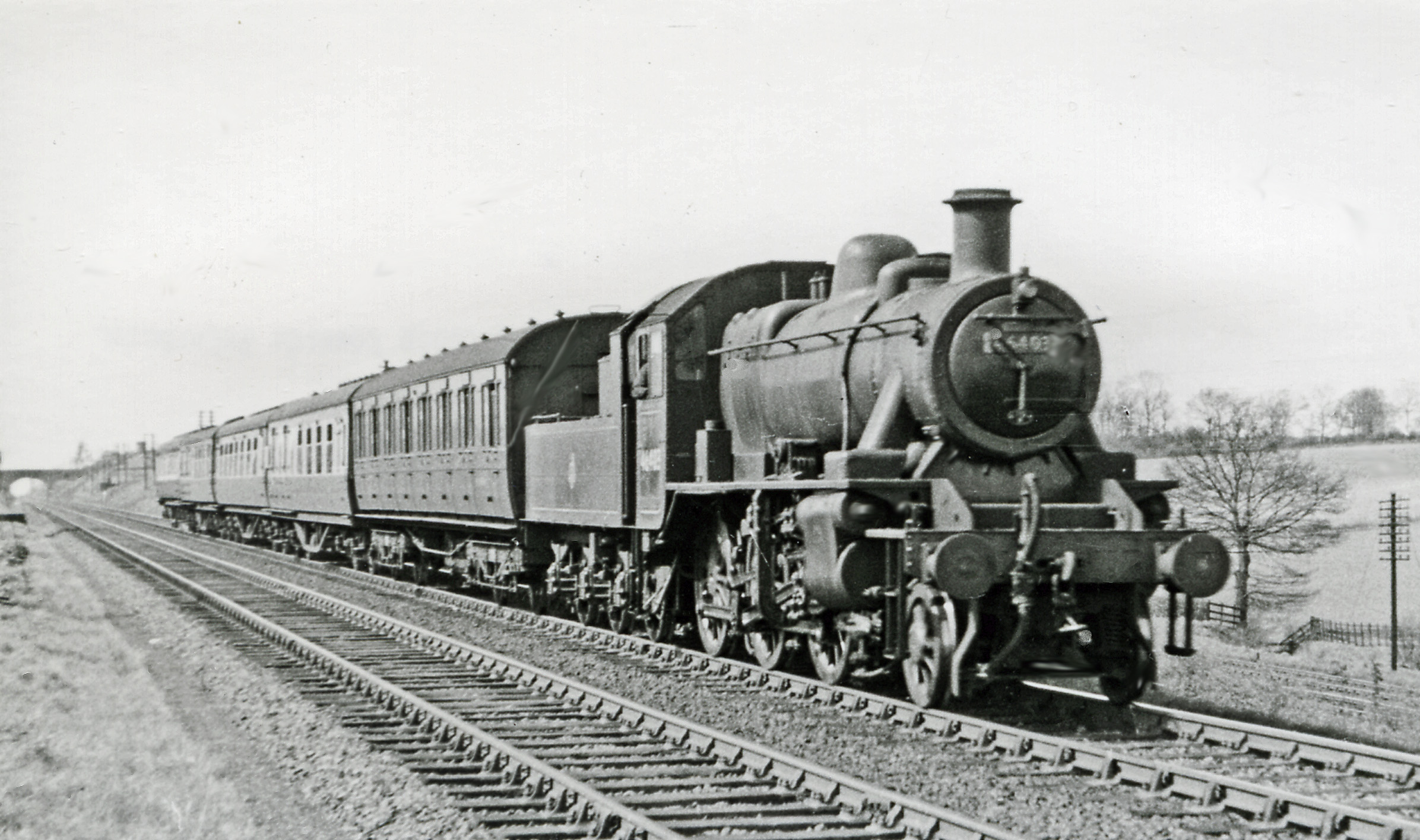
- 46403 on the Midland Main Line near Souldrop in 1955.
Type and origin
- Power type: Steam
- Designer: H. G. Ivatt
- Builder: LMS & BR Crewe works; BR Darlington Works; BR Swindon Works
- Build date: 1946–1953
- Total produced: 128
Specifications
- Configuration
  - Whyte: 2-6-0
  - UIC: 1′C h2
- Gauge: 4 ft 8 1/2 in (1,435 mm) standard gauge
- Leading dia.: 3 ft 0 in (0.914 m)
- Driver dia.: 5 ft 0 in (1.524 m)
- Length: 53 ft 1 3/4 in (16.20 m)
- Loco weight: 47.10 long tons (47.9 t; 52.8 short tons) (6400–64); 48.45 long tons (49.2 t) (remainder)
- Tender weight: 37.15 long tons (37.7 t; 41.6 short tons)
- Fuel type: Coal
- Fuel capacity: 4 long tons (4.1 t; 4.5 short tons)
- Water cap.: 3,000 imp gal (14,000 L; 3,600 US gal)
- Firebox
  - Grate area: 17 1/2 sq ft (1.63 m^{2})
- Boiler: LMS type 7
- Boiler pressure: 200 lbf/in^{2} (1.38 MPa)
- Heating surface
  - Firebox: 101 sq ft (9.4 m^{2})
  - Tubes: 924 sq ft (85.8 m^{2})
- Superheater
  - Heating area: 134 sq ft (12.4 m^{2}) or 124 sq ft (11.5 m^{2})
- Cylinders: Two, outside
- Cylinder size: 16 in × 24 in (406 mm × 610 mm)
- Valve gear: Walschaerts
Performance figures
- Tractive effort: 17,410–18,510 lbf (77.44–82.34 kN)
Career
- Operators: London, Midland and Scottish Railway; British Railways
- Power class: LMS: 2F; BR: 2MT
- Numbers: LMS:6400–6419; BR: 46400–46527
- Nicknames: Mickey Mouse
- Axle load class: BR: Route Availability 2
- Withdrawn: 1961–1967
- Disposition: 7 preserved, remainder scrapped

The London, Midland and Scottish Railway (LMS) Ivatt Class 2 2-6-0 is a class of steam locomotive designed for light mixed traffic.

== Design ==
Elderly 0-6-0s formed the backbone of the low-powered locomotives within the LMS fleet. William Stanier had concentrated on introducing larger engines and it was left to George Ivatt to introduce a new class of low-powered locomotive. He designed a tender version of the Ivatt Class 2 2-6-2T, introduced at the same time, which was inspired by the Stanier Class 3 2-6-2T, which was inspired by the Fowler Class 3 2-6-2T. The 2-6-0s had greater range: 3,000 imperial gallons (14,000 L; 3,600 US gal) of water and 4 long tons (4.1 t; 4.5 short tons) of coal compared to the tank design's 1,350 imperial gallons (6,100 L; 1,620 US gal) and 3 long tons (3.05 t; 3.36 short tons). They were thus well-suited to their task and performed well following draughting problems being resolved by both Derby and Swindon. Further engines of this type were built as the BR Standard Class 2 2-6-0, these locomotives having BR standard fittings and a modified cab and tender profile to allow completely unrestricted route availability; both LMS and BR 2MT moguls are often nicknamed "Mickey Mouse".

== Construction ==
A total of 128 were built between 1946 and 1953, mostly at Crewe. 20 were built by LMS and given the numbers 6400–19. On nationalisation in 1948 40000 was added to their numbers to become 46400–19. The remaining 108 locomotives of the class, numbered 46420–46527 were built by British Railways, and from 46465 (Darlington, 1951) an increase in cylinder diameter of 1/2 inch (13 mm) yielded a tractive effort of 18,510 lbf (82.3 kN), 1,100 lbf (4.9 kN) greater than the original design. The LMS classified them 2F, BR as 2MT.

Table of orders
Number		Lot no.	Date	Built at
LMS	BR	Lot no.	Date	Built at
6400–09	46400–09	182	1946	Crewe
6410–19	46410–19	189	1947	Crewe
—	46420–34	194	1948	Crewe
—	46435–49	201	1950	Crewe
—	46450–59	207	1950	Crewe
—	46460–64	208	1950	Crewe
—	46465–82	1309	1951	Darlington
—	46483–94	1310	1951	Darlington
—	46495–502	1310	1952	Darlington
—	46503–14	394	1952	Swindon
—	46515–27	394	1953	Swindon

The 38 members of the Darlington-built batch (46465 to 46502) were allocated to the Eastern and North Eastern Regions of British Railways. The final 25 (46503 to 46527) were built at Swindon Works and, being allocated to the Western Region, consequently carried the GWR-type vacuum ejector and firehole doors. The Swindon locomotives were initially turned out in lined black. Under the Hanks regime, some received lined green livery as they passed through works while the rest remained black. None of the class was named in service, however some have been named in preservation.

== Withdrawal ==
The class was withdrawn between 1961 and 1967.

Table of withdrawals
Year	Quantity in service at start of year	Quantity withdrawn	Locomotive numbers
1961	128	1	46407.
1962	127	12	46408/15/53/66/69/71/76–78/81/93/95.
1963	115	4	46438/73/83/89.
1964	111	8	46403/09/35/61/67/74–75, 46525.
1965	103	21	46404/13/20/23/25/30/44/56/59/68/72/79/82/88/97–98, 46510–11/24/27.
1966	82	40	46401/05/10/12/14/16/19/21–22/24/26–29/34/42/45–47/50–51/54/58/60/62–64/95–96, 46504/08–09/12–14/17–19/21/26.
1967	42	42	46400/02/06/11/17–18/31–33/36–37/39–41/43/48–49/52/55/57/65/70/80/84–87/90–92/99, 46500–03/05–06/15–16/20/22–23.

== Accidents and incidents ==
- On 27 April 2013, No. 46521 derailed on the trap points at Quorn and Woodhouse on the Great Central Railway following a misunderstanding between the signalman and the locomotive's crew. The derailment was captured on video by a visitor and subsequently posted on YouTube. Nobody was injured, and the locomotive was recovered using a crane; it was then towed back to the shed by BR Class 45 No. D123. Almost one month after the incident, the locomotive returned to service.

== Preservation ==
Seven members of the class have been preserved, five built at Crewe Works and two built at Swindon Works. Of the seven engines preserved, six have run in preservation (46428 is undergoing restoration from scrapyard condition to working order at the East Lancs Railway). Three members of the class have also operated on the mainline in preservation: No's 46441, 46443 & 46521. Three of them were purchased from British Railways while the other four preserved examples were rescued from Barry Scrapyard throughout the 1970s. The ones rescued from Barry Scrapyard include No. 46428, No. 46447, No. 46512, and No. 46521. The ones sold directly into preservation from British Railways include No. 46441, No. 46443, and No. 46464.

46443 became a popular mainline engine in the 1980s when it was one of the engines used during the 150th anniversary of the Great Western Railway traveling along many old branchlines including the old Bristol Harbour Railway. 46521 saw use on the mainline in the 1990s but only saw a limited amount of use hauling excursion trains with one of its runs being on the GWML in December 1994.. 46441 was one of the smallest tender engines to operate on the former BR system during the 1990s. As well as being a regular at Carnforth and working at its home on the East Lancashire Railway it was also used for the regular steam on the met programme working trains alongside other steam engines. 46441 in recent years has been on static display inside the museum at the Ribble Steam Railway in Preston awaiting an overhaul. In April 2018 the engine was moved by road to its new home at the Lakeside and Haverthwaite Railway, it is presently the only tender engine based at the railway.

BR no	Image	Name*	Builder	Built	Withdrawn	In service	Current location	Current condition	Livery
46428			Crewe Works	Dec 1948	Dec 1966	17 Years, 11 Months	East Lancashire Railway	Under Restoration	N/A
46428		Oldest surviving member of the class. Being restored from condition as recovered from Woodham Brothers scrapyard, Barry, Vale of Glamorgan, South Wales.							
46441			Crewe Works	Feb 1950	Apr 1967	17 Years, 2 Months	Lakeside and Haverthwaite Railway	Running In	BR Lined Crimson, Late Crest (on completion)
46441		The engine commenced its running in tests in October 2023 and is expected to re-enter revenue service in 2024. Boiler Ticket expires 2033. The engine will retain its non-authentic BR Maroon on completion.							
46443			Crewe Works	Feb 1950	Mar 1967	17 Years, 28 Days	Severn Valley Railway	Static Display	BR Lined Black, Late Crest
46443		Stored awaiting overhaul in The Engine House, Highley.							
46447			Crewe Works	Mar 1950	Dec 1966	16 Years, 9 Months	East Somerset Railway	Operational	BR Unlined Black, Late Crest
46447		Returned to operation October 2014. On loan from the Isle of Wight Steam Railway.							
46464		The Carmyllie Pilot (Note: Named in preservation)	Crewe Works	Jun 1950	Sept 1966	16 Years, 3 Months	Strathspey Railway	Operational	N/A
46464		After preservation, hauled the first scheduled passenger train on the Strathspey Railway on 22 July 1978. Last ran in 1979 and now restored to working order. The name "Carmyllie Pilot" was used, during their working years, for both 46463 and 46464, both Dundee Tay Bridge (62B) allocated engines. Both locomotives took week about pilot duties at Arbroath station, and were often seen working the Carmyllie Railway branch line, either to the Metal Box factory or the Quarries at Carmyllie. Local railway staff referred to either locomotive as The Carmyllie Pilot, dependent on which was on duty. The engine underwent its steam test in November 2023 and its overhaul was completed in June 2024, when it was steamed for the first time in 44 years.							
46512		E.V. Cooper, Engineer	Swindon Works	Dec 1952	Dec 1966	13 Years, 11 Months	Strathspey Railway	Operational	BR Lined Black, Early Emblem
46512		Boiler Ticket expires 2031.							
46521		Blossom	Swindon Works	Mar 1953	Oct 1966	13 Years, 7 Months	Great Central Railway	Under Overhaul	BR Lined Green, Early Emblem (on completion)
46521		Boiler ticket expired in 2022. Dismantling for overhaul commenced in October 2023.							

== Models ==
Several 00 gauge ready-to-run models of the locomotive have been produced. In 1975, Hornby Railways produced a model of the class, in British Railways lined black (mixed traffic) livery. A BR lined green version followed in 1978. They were on sale until 1982. In 2007 Bachmann Branchline introduced a more detailed model, available in several liveries including LMS unlined black, BR lined black and BR lined Brunswick Green, the latter livery of which was used for a model of now preserved 46521. Graham Farish produces several of the same liveries in British N gauge. Comet Models produce an all-metal kit.

== In fiction ==
No. 46521 appeared in the sitcom Oh, Doctor Beeching!. It was for this that it received the name 'Blossom'.

Both 46443 and 46521 appeared in the 1976 Universal Pictures film The Seven-Per-Cent Solution. For this role both locomotives were heavily disguised to have a European flavour.
