= LMS Ivatt Class 2 2-6-2T 41241 =

Preserved British 2-6-2T locomotive

LMS 41241
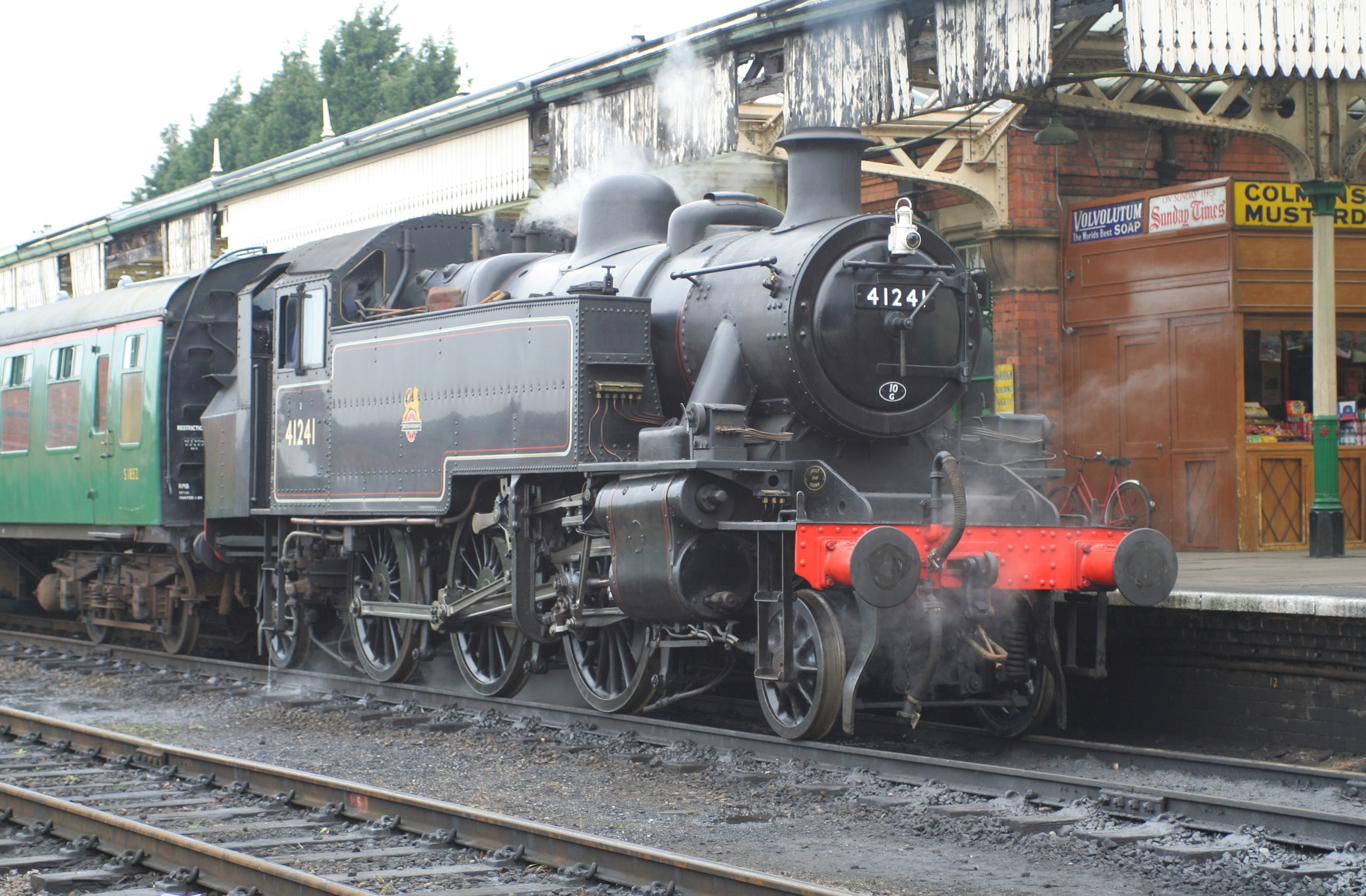
- 41241 Waiting to depart from Loughborough Central on the Great Central Railway.
Type and origin
- Power type: Steam
- Designer: H. G. Ivatt
- Builder: BR Crewe Works
- Order number: Lot 205
- Build date: September 1949
Specifications
- Configuration
  - Whyte: 2-6-2T
  - UIC: 1′C1′ h2t
- Gauge: 4 ft 8 1/2 in (1,435 mm) standard gauge
- Leading dia.: 3 ft 0 in (0.914 m)
- Driver dia.: 5 ft 0 in (1.524 m)
- Trailing dia.: 3 ft 0 in (0.914 m)
- Wheelbase: 30 ft 3 in (9.22 m)
- Length: 38 ft 9 1/2 in (11.82 m)
- Loco weight: 63.25 long tons (64.3 t; 70.8 short tons); 41290–41329: 65.20 long tons (66.2 t; 73.0 short tons)
- Fuel type: Coal
- Fuel capacity: 3 long tons (3.05 t; 3.36 short tons)
- Water cap.: 1,350 imp gal (6,100 L; 1,620 US gal)
- Firebox
  - Grate area: 17.5 sq ft (1.63 m^{2})
- Boiler: LMS type 7
- Boiler pressure: 200 lbf/in^{2} (1.38 MPa)
- Heating surface
  - Firebox: 101 sq ft (9.4 m^{2})
  - Tubes and flues: 924 sq ft (85.8 m^{2})
- Superheater
  - Heating area: 134 sq ft (12.4 m^{2}) or 124 sq ft (11.5 m^{2})
- Cylinders: Two, outside
- Cylinder size: 16 in × 26 in (406 mm × 660 mm)
Performance figures
- Tractive effort: 17,400 lbf (77.40 kN)
Career
- Operators: British Railways
- Power class: 2MT
- Axle load class: Route Availability 1
- Withdrawn: December 1966
- Disposition: Operational at the K&WVR

41241 is an LMS Ivatt Class 2 2-6-2T that was built at Crewe Works in September 1949. It is one of four members of the class left in preservation but one of only two that is located on the mainland (the other locomotive being 41312); the other pair being located on the Isle of Wight.

== Working life ==
Number 41241 was built by British Railways at Crewe Works in September 1949. From new it was allocated to Bath Green Park on the Somerset and Dorset Joint Railway and saw use on local passenger services over the S&D including the occasional banking job. Alongside spending the first 9 years allocated to the S&D it was reallocated to Bristol Barrow Road in July 1958, this however was not to last for long and it returned to its former home at Bath Green Park in October 1958 (by then under the control of the Western Region of British Railways).

Other shed allocations it was based at included: Wellington, Leamington Spa, Bangor, Croes Newydd, Llandudno Junction and Skipton. Following its allocation to Wellington, it was transferred back to the London Midland Region and was allocated to Leamington from February 1964. The final shed allocation was to Skipton, and it was to remain there for the rest of its working days on BR until 10 December 1966 when it was withdrawn from service.

Shed allocations
Location	Shed code	From
Bath Green Park	22C	1 October 1949
Bristol Barrow Road	82E	12 July 1958
Bath Green Park	82F	4 October 1958
Wellington	84H	31 October 1959
Leamington	2L	1 February 1964
Wellington	84H	13 June 1964
Bangor	6H	20 June 1964
Croes Newydd	6C	8 August 1964
Llandudno Junction	6G	12 June 1965
Skipton	10G	11 September 1965

== Purchase from BR ==
Number 41241 was purchased directly from BR by the nearby Keighley & Worth Valley Railway for preservation, arriving on the KWVR in March 1967 under its own power. Due to BR requiring that preserved steam locomotives did not wear the BR livery with their then current crest, it was repainted into lined maroon livery with the letters K&WVR written on her sidetanks. It wore this livery for the railway's reopening in June 1968 and in 1975 it made its only preservation mainline appearance at the Rocket 150 cavalcade in Shildon; it arrived and returned from the event under its own power with a set of the Worth Valley's coaches.

It was later repainted into authentic BR black livery and this livery it has worn for most of its preservation career; it has worn both the early and late versions of the BR black livery in preservation and is expected to keep this as its main livery. It last operated on a heritage railway in January 2013 and has since then being undergoing an overhaul at Haworth. With 2018 being the 50th anniversary since the K&WVR was opened in 1968 as well as the 50th anniversary since 1T57 in August 1968, the K&WVR had decided that it would return to its original maroon livery with the K&WVR lettering on its sidetanks. After an extensive overhaul, it was able to run in the K&WVR 50th Anniversary gala in July 2018, and now operates regularly on the K&WVR.

== Photographs ==
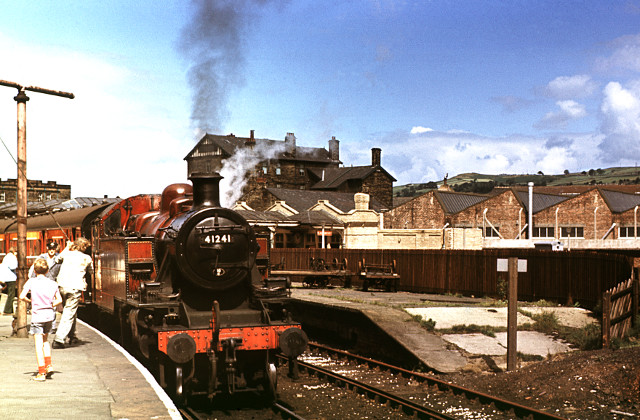
41241 at Keighley in non-authentic KWVR maroon in 1974

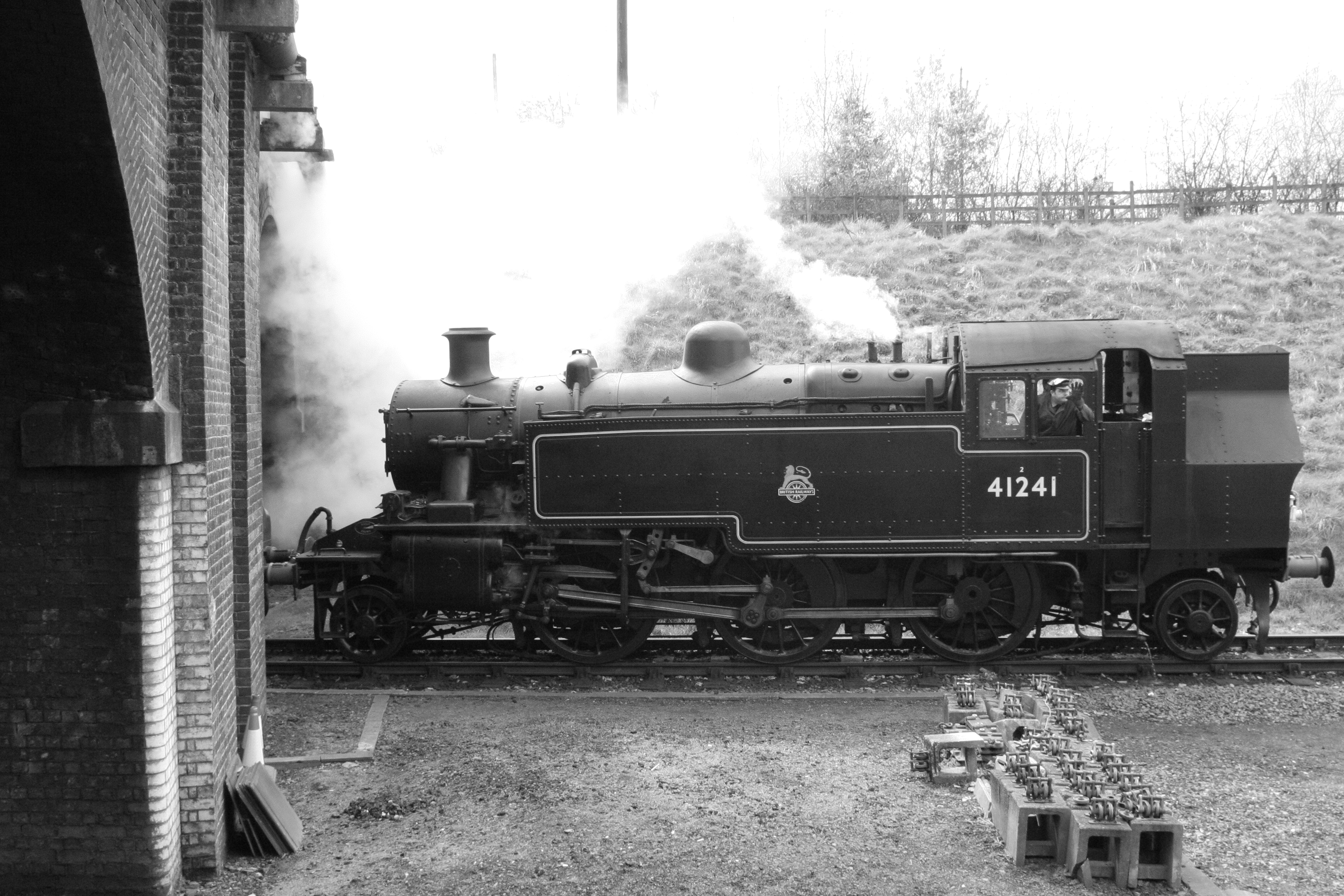
41241 waiting to depart Rothley during a visit to the Great Central Railway

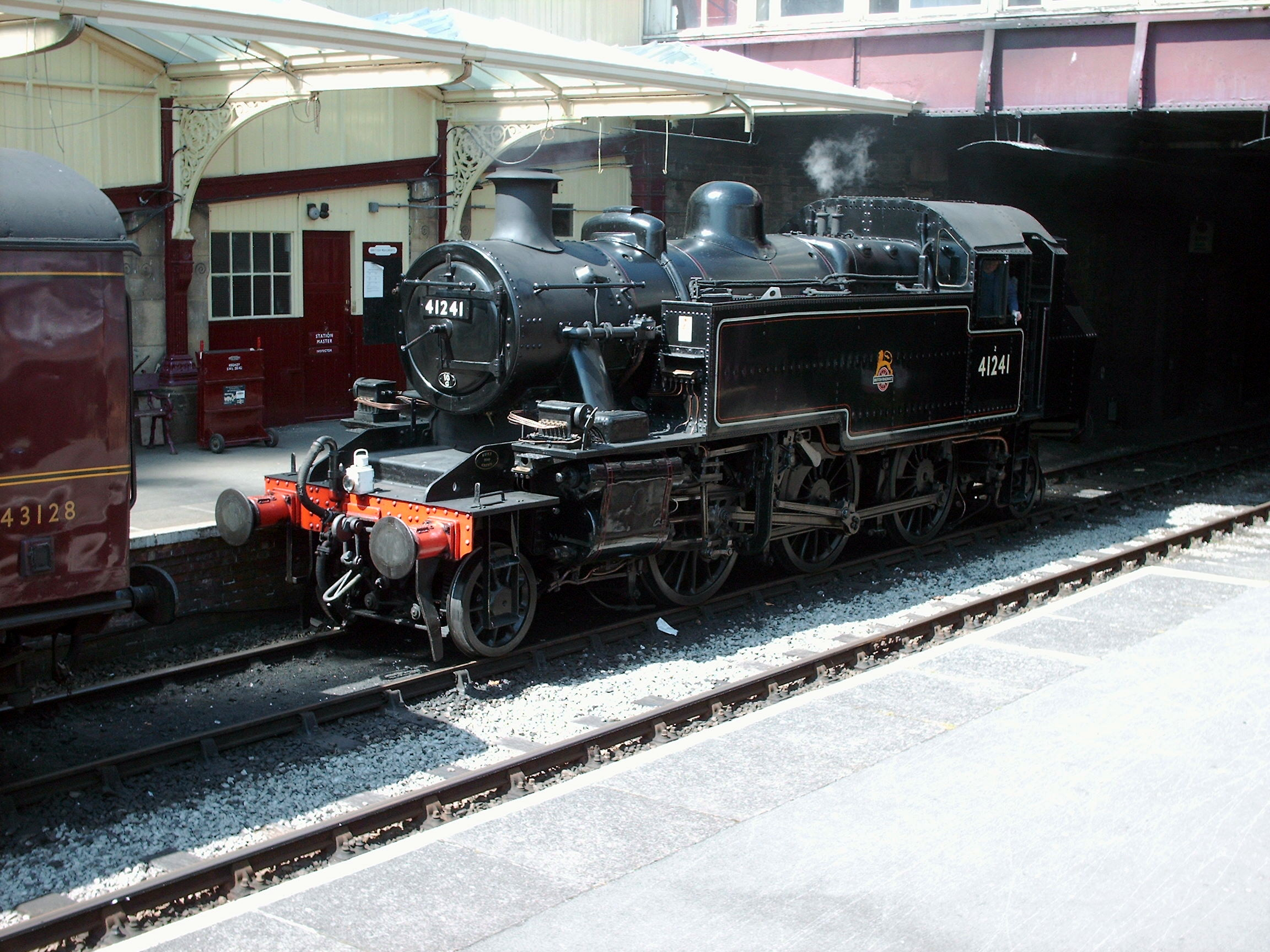
41241 running around its train at Keighley

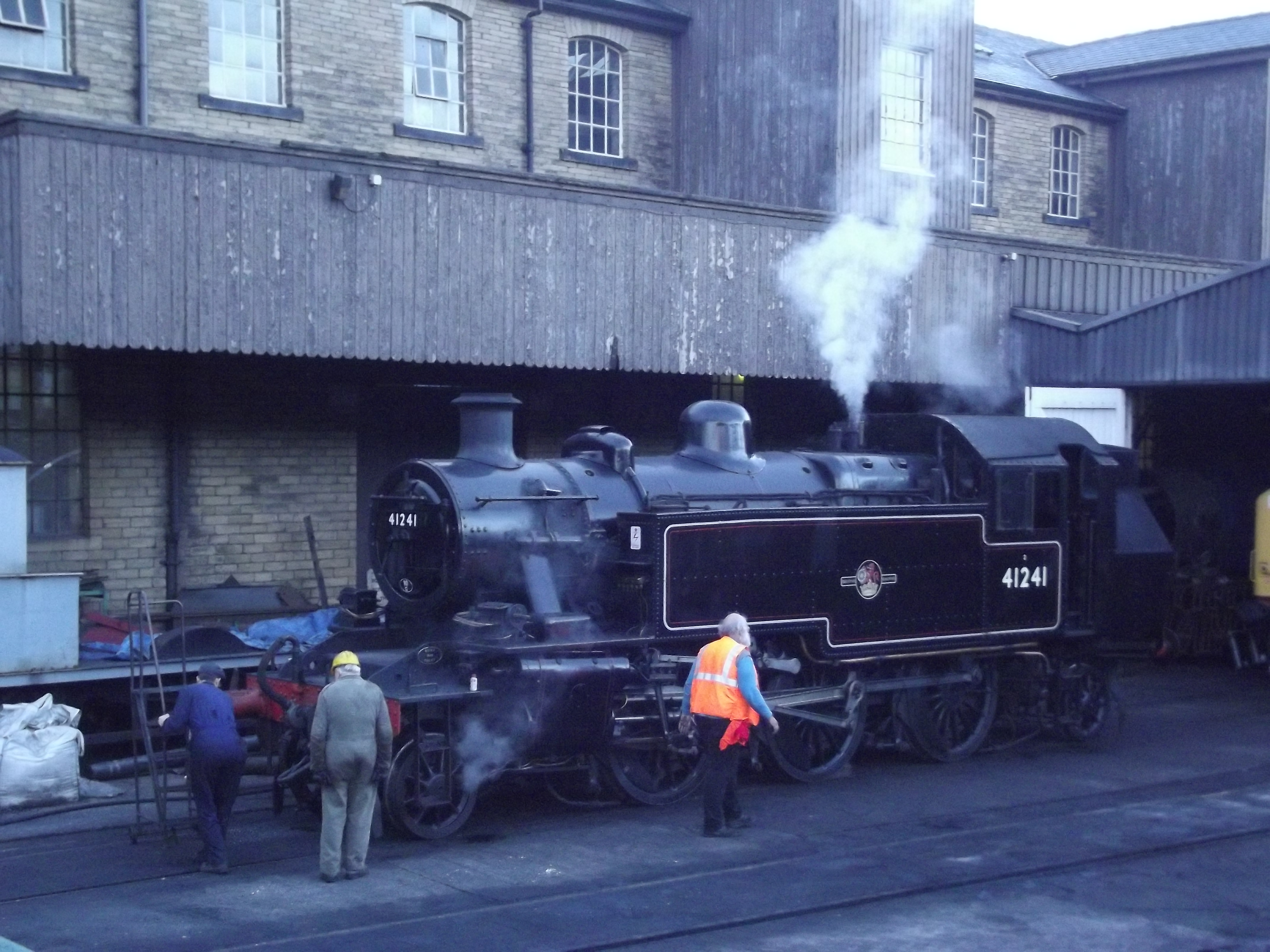
41241 being checked over at Haworth shed in Oct 2012
