= LMS Ivatt Class 2 2-6-2T 41312 =

LMS 41312
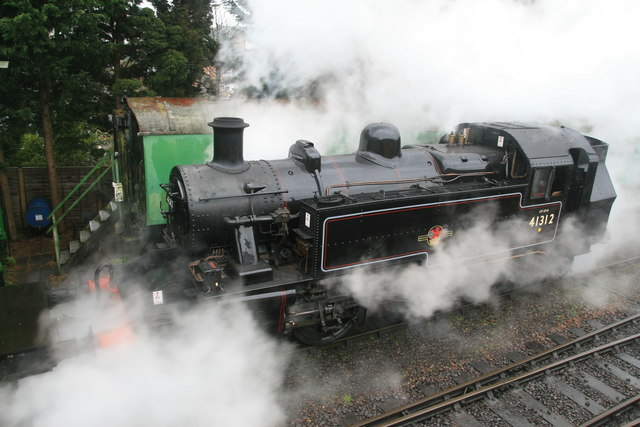
- 41312 running around its train on the Watercress Line
Type and origin
- Power type: Steam
- Designer: H. G. Ivatt
- Builder: BR Crewe Works
- Build date: May 1952
Specifications
- Configuration
  - Whyte: 2-6-2T
  - UIC: 1′C1′ h2t
- Gauge: 4 ft 8 1/2 in (1,435 mm) standard gauge
- Leading dia.: 3 ft 0 in (0.914 m)
- Driver dia.: 5 ft 0 in (1.524 m)
- Trailing dia.: 3 ft 0 in (0.914 m)
- Wheelbase: 30 ft 3 in (9.22 m)
- Length: 38 ft 9 1/2 in (11.82 m)
- Loco weight: 63.25 long tons (64.3 t; 70.8 short tons); 41290–41329: 65.20 long tons (66.2 t; 73.0 short tons)
- Fuel type: Coal
- Fuel capacity: 3 long tons (3.05 t; 3.36 short tons)
- Water cap.: 1,350 imp gal (6,100 L; 1,620 US gal)
- Firebox
  - Grate area: 17.5 sq ft (1.63 m^{2})
- Boiler: LMS type 7
- Boiler pressure: 200 lbf/in^{2} (1.38 MPa)
- Heating surface
  - Firebox: 101 sq ft (9.4 m^{2})
  - Tubes and flues: 924 sq ft (85.8 m^{2})
- Superheater
  - Heating area: 134 sq ft (12.4 m^{2}) or 124 sq ft (11.5 m^{2})
- Cylinders: Two, outside
- Cylinder size: 16 1/2 in × 24 in (419 mm × 610 mm)
Performance figures
- Tractive effort: 17,400 lbf (77.40 kN)
Career
- Operators: British Railways
- Power class: BR: 2MT; BR (SR): 2P/2FA
- Axle load class: Route Availability 1
- Withdrawn: July 1967
- Disposition: Operational

LMS Ivatt Class 2 2-6-2T No. 41312 is an LMS Ivatt Class 2 2-6-2T that was built at Crewe Works in May 1952. It is one of four members of the class left in preservation but one of two that are located on the mainland (the second engine being 41241). The other two are located on the Isle of Wight.

== Working life ==
41312 was built by British Railways at Crewe Works in May 1952. From new until withdrawal it was allocated to the Southern Region of BR with its first shed allocation being at Faversham (73E) from May 1952. It was later allocated to: Ashford, Barnstaple Junction, Brighton and Bournemouth. In the last few months of steam operations on the Southern Region it was allocated to Nine Elms (70A) from 17 April 1967 and it was to remain there for the remainder of its working career.

It was withdrawn from service by BR when steam operations ended on the Southern Region of British Railways in July 1967. Following withdrawal it was sold to Woodham Brothers and taken to Barry Scrapyard.

Shed allocations
Location	Shed code	From
Faversham	73E	May 1952
Ashford	73F	14 June 1959
Barnstaple Junction	72E	9 February 1960
Brighton	75A	1 April 1963
Bournemouth	70F	25 May 1964
Nine Elms	70A	17 April 1967

== Preservation ==
=== Mainline certification ===
In the late 1990s, it was overhauled for use on the national network. For this it was given the TOPS number (British Rail Class 98) 98212. At the time the Mid Hants Railway were running their own charter train company known as "Daylight Railtours" and it was decided for it to be certified for mainline use to work a couple of smaller trains around the south of England. Due to its limited water capacity of 1,350 gallons, it was not able to stray too far from its home at the Mid Hants and it was not able to work the normal 10-to-11 coach trains that Daylight Railtours usually ran. It returned to service in 2016 after being overhauled, but has not been certified for mainline use.
