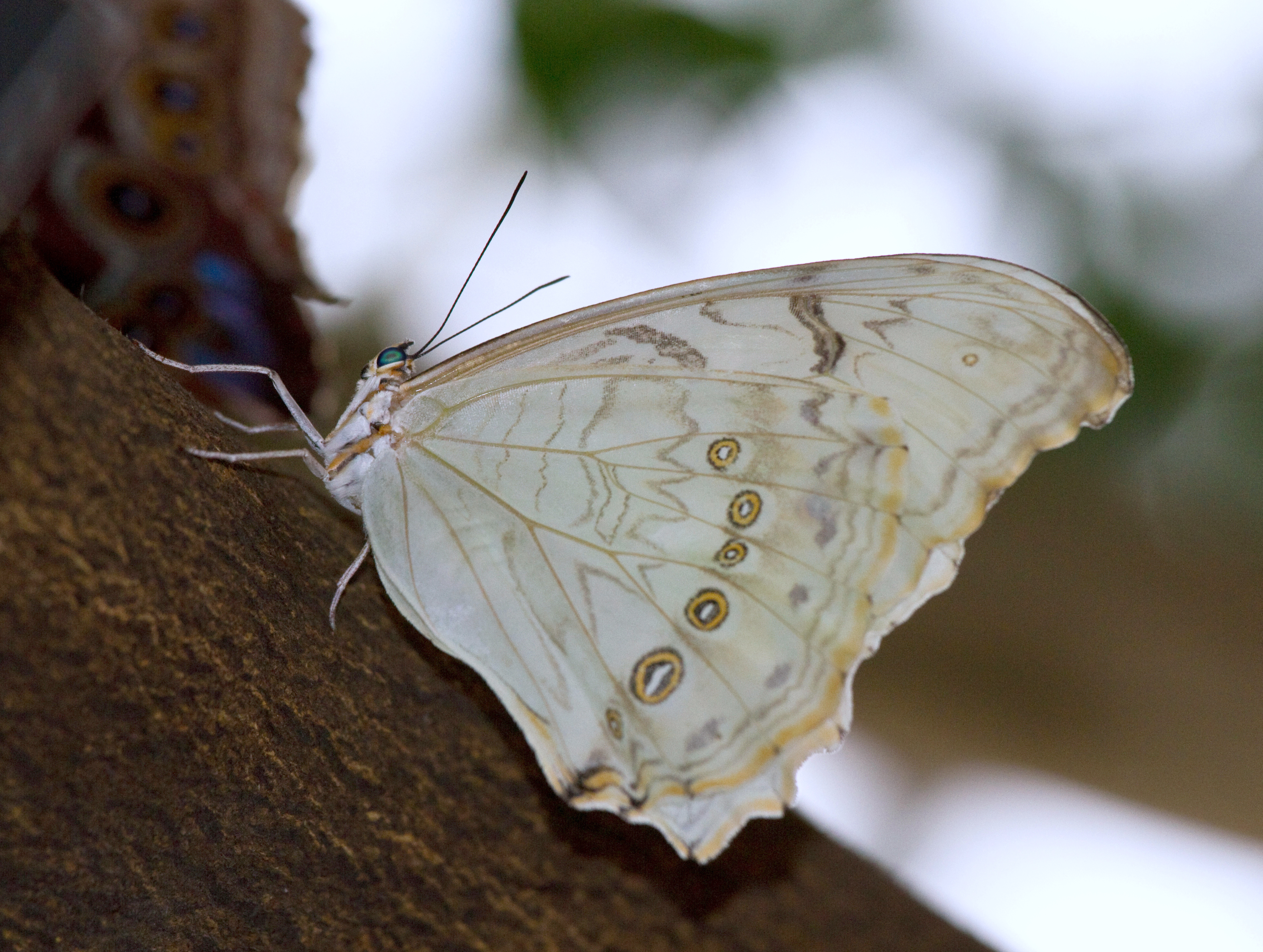

Scientific classification
- Kingdom: Animalia
- Phylum: Arthropoda
- Clade: Pancrustacea
- Class: Insecta
- Order: Lepidoptera
- Family: Nymphalidae
- Genus: Morpho
- Species: M. polyphemus

Binomial name
- Morpho polyphemus Westwood, 1850

= Morpho polyphemus =

White morpho

Species of butterfly

Morpho polyphemus, the white morpho or Polyphemus white morpho, is a white butterfly of Mexico and Central America, ranging as far south as Costa Rica. As suggested by its name, this is one of the relatively few Morphos that is white rather than blue. Some authorities include M. luna, which is also white, as a subspecies of M. polyphemus.

== Identification ==
Both the upper and lower wings are bright white, with some small light brown markings. There is a row of small eyespots on the underside of the hindwings.

== Host plant ==
The caterpillar has been known to eat Paullinia pinnata (family Sapindaceae) and Inga (family Fabaceae).

== Etymology ==
The species epithet is derived from Polyphemus, a character in Greek mythology, from the small eyespots on the wing. Polyphemus was the one-eyed son of Poseidon and Thoosa.

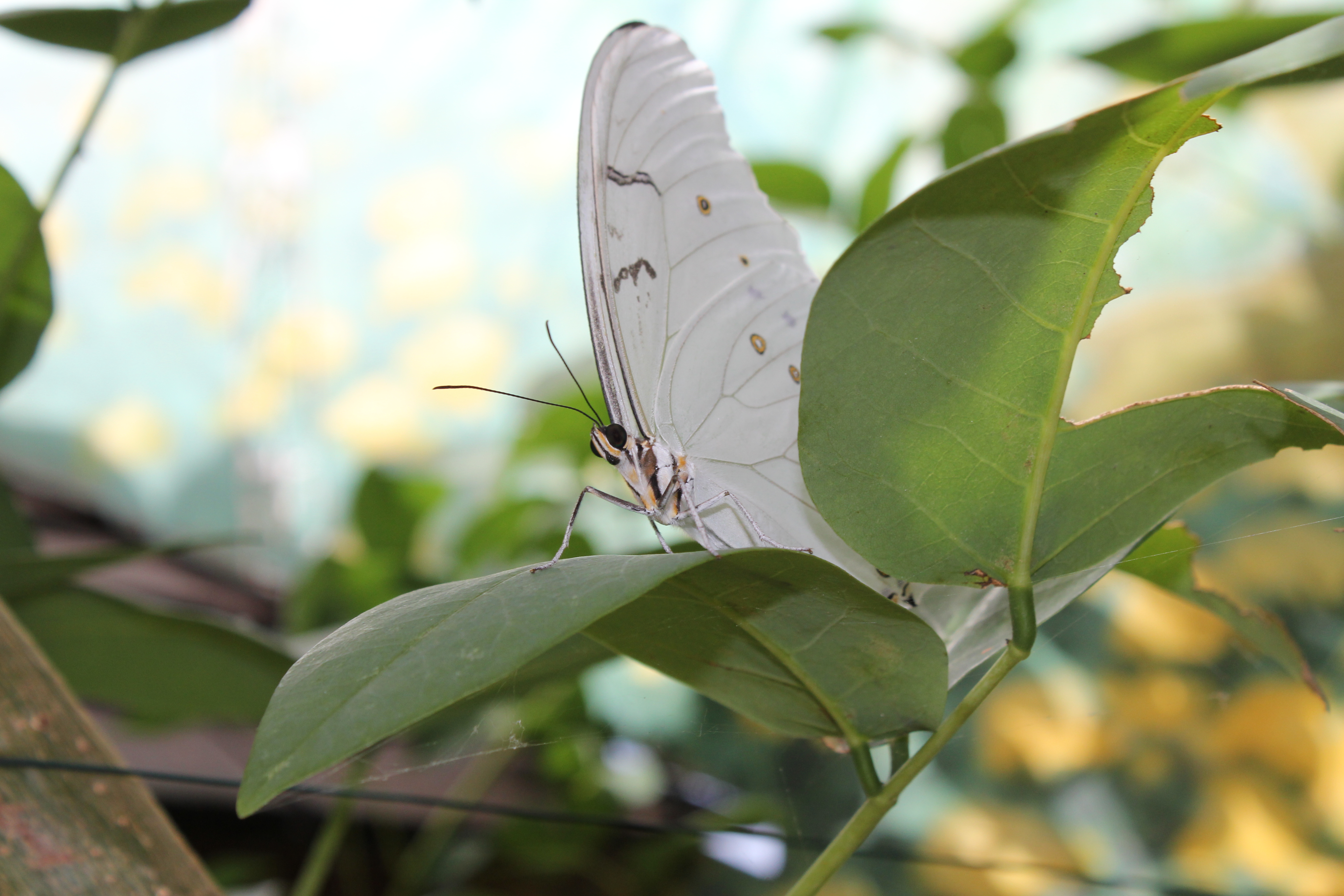
At Butterfly World in the United Kingdom

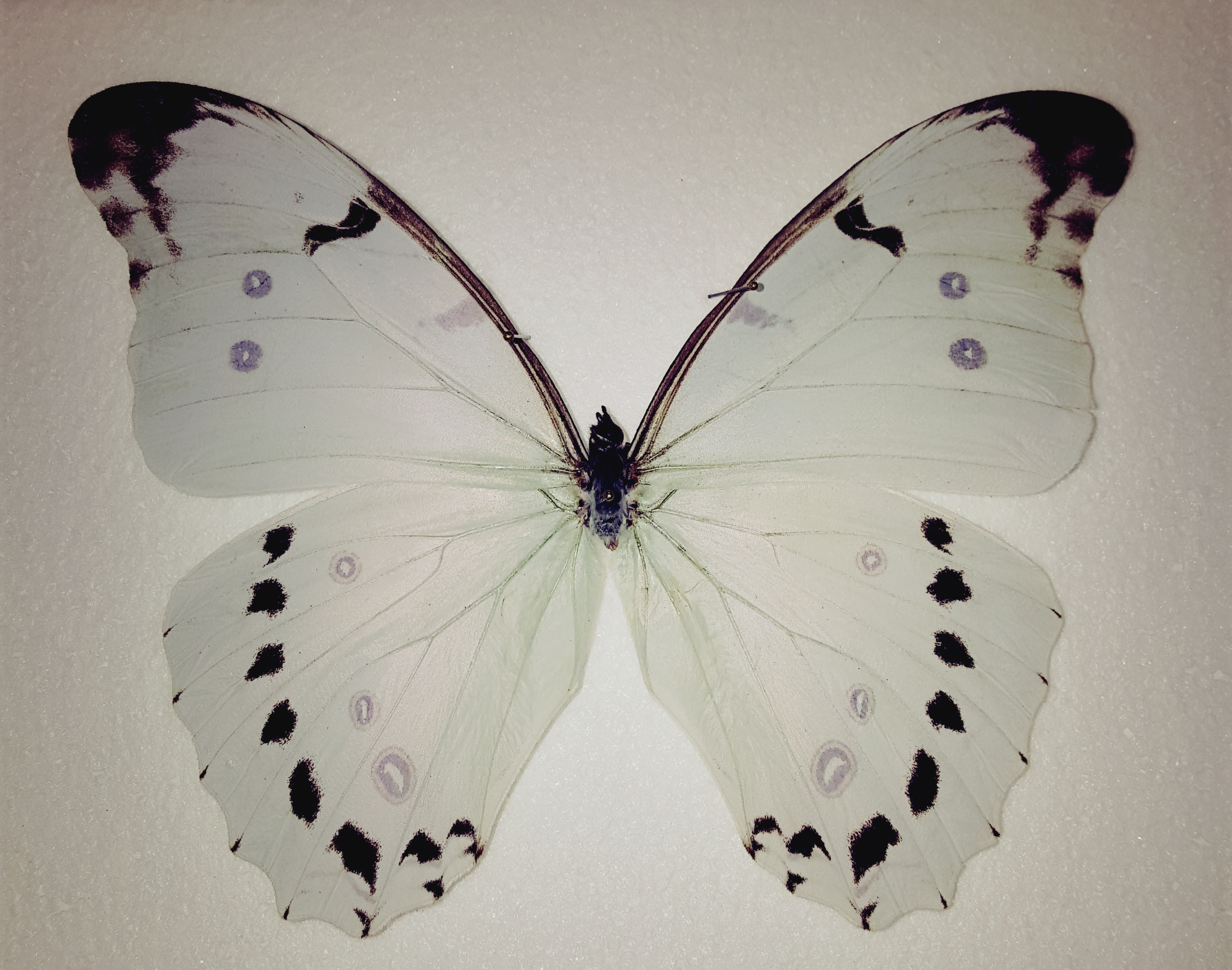
Public Domain photo of Morpho polyphemus butterfly.

== Description ==
Account by Hans Fruhstorfer in Die Gross-Schmetterlinge der Erde:

"M. polyphemus Db. & Hew. (68c) differs from its Brazilian relatives in the chalky white upper surface of both wings with delicate mother-of-pearl gloss, and also in the projecting apex of the forewing and the sharp teeth of the hindwing. On the upper surface the black distal bordering is absent and the discocellular shows only a quite narrow stripe. The ocelli [eyespots] of the forewing are larger than in Morpho catenarius, those of the wing more distinctly white-centred. As Morpho luna Butler has described an aberration from Mexico with the black spots on both wings unusually well developed. The flight of polyphemus is extremely rapid and irregular, and according to Godman and Salvin the species ascends in Guatemala to 4000 ft. [1200 m] and is often met with near the ground in villages or also high up round the tops of trees in the timber-forest. Distributed from Mexico to Guatemala and Nicaragua, occasionally also occurring in Panama."
