= Ivatt =

Ivatt is a surname. Notable persons with that name include:

- Henry Ivatt (1851–1923), English railway engineer, Chief Mechanical Engineer of the Great Northern Railway
- George Ivatt (1886–1976), Irish railway engineer, Chief Mechanical Engineer of the London Midland and Scottish Railway, son of the above
