= Charles Fairburn =

English electrical engineer (1887–1945)

- Born: 5 September 1887; Bradford, Yorkshire, England
- Died: 12 October 1945 (aged 58)
- Education: Brasenose College, Oxford
- Engineering career
- Discipline: Electrical

Charles Edward Fairburn (5 September 1887 – 12 October 1945) was an English electrical engineer whose work mainly concerned rail transport.

Born in Bradford in 1887, and educated at Brasenose College, Oxford, his career included railway electrification work undertaken in the 1910s at the Siemens Brothers Dynamo Works Ltd., then similar work at English Electric in the 1920s where he also was involved in electric traction development work. In 1934 he joined the London, Midland and Scottish Railway where he was responsible for the introduction of new classes of diesel-electric shunting locomotives - he became Chief Mechanical Engineer of the company in the 1940s, but died in 1945 aged 58.

== Biography ==
Charles Edward Fairburn was born on 5 September 1887 in Bradford. After an education at Bradford Grammar School he won a scholarship to Brasenose College, Oxford University where he studied mathematics and engineering, and obtained a first class degree. After college he served two years under the tutelage of Henry Fowler at the Derby Works of the Midland Railway. He studied technical drawing at Derby, and metallurgy at Sheffield, obtaining an MA in 1912.

Fairburn's career then began in 1912 at the Siemens Brothers dynamo works (Siemens Brothers Dynamo Works Ltd.) in Stafford, where he worked in the railway engineering department; he was an assistant engineer on the Shildon-Newport electrification of the North Eastern Railway (see Railway electrification in Great Britain), being responsible for the design of overhead line electrification equipment and introduction of electric locomotives.

In 1914 he married Eleanor Cadman of Bradford.

During World War I Fairburn served in the Royal Flying Corps in an experimental squadron, where he was involved in the development of dive bomber aircraft using the Sopwith Camel, also developing night, formation and cloud flying, and organising training in those subjects. In 1919 he joined English Electric and developed their railway electrification department; by 1931 he had risen to chief engineer of the traction department, having been involved in electrification schemes on the Southern Railway, the New Zealand Government Railways, the Great Indian Peninsula Railway, the London Post Office Railway, and the Danske Statsbaner. He collaborated with Kálmán Kandó of the Ganz Works in Hungary.

In 1934 Fairburn joined the London, Midland and Scottish Railway (LMS) as Chief Electrical Engineer. In 1938 he was appointed Deputy Chief Mechanical Engineer (CME) under William Stanier. He was responsible for the introduction of diesel-electric shunters onto the LMS, creating types that would form the basis of over 1400 shunters used by British Railways.

Fairburn was made Acting CME of the LMS when Stanier was called away on war work in 1942 at the Ministry of Production and became CME in 1944, on Stanier's retirement.

In 1945 he introduced the LMS Fairburn 2-6-4T, a modified version of the LMS Stanier 2-6-4T with a shortened wheelbase, and made proposals for the first mainline diesel locomotives which were carried out under his successor H.G. Ivatt. (see also LMS 10000)

Fairburn died of a heart attack aged 58 on 12 October 1945. He was survived by his wife, Eleanor, with whom he had had two children.

== Works ==
- Fairburn, C.E. (1938), "The trend of design of electric locomotives", Journal of the Institution of Electrical Engineers, 83 (503): 581–617, doi:10.1049/jiee-1.1938.0174
- Fairburn, C. E. (1941). "Diesel shunting locomotives". Journal of the Institution of Locomotive Engineers. 31 (161): 175–225. doi:10.1243/JILE_PROC_1941_031_028_02.
- Fairburn, C. E. (1944). "The maintenance of diesel electric shunting locomotives on the L.M.S. Railway". Journal of the Institution of Locomotive Engineers. 34 (179): 212–226. doi:10.1243/JILE_PROC_1944_034_020_02.
- Fairburn, C. E. (1944). "The Electrification of the Wirral Lines of the London, Midland and Scottish Railway. Railway Engineering Division". The Institution of Civil Engineers Engineering Division Papers. 2 (5): 1–34. doi:10.1680/idivp.1944.13219.

Business positions
Preceded by William Stanier	Chief Mechanical Engineer of the London, Midland and Scottish Railway; 1944 – 1945	Succeeded by Henry George Ivatt
