= LMS Fowler 2-6-2T =

Class of two-cylinder 2-6-2T locomotives

LMS Fowler 3P 2-6-2T
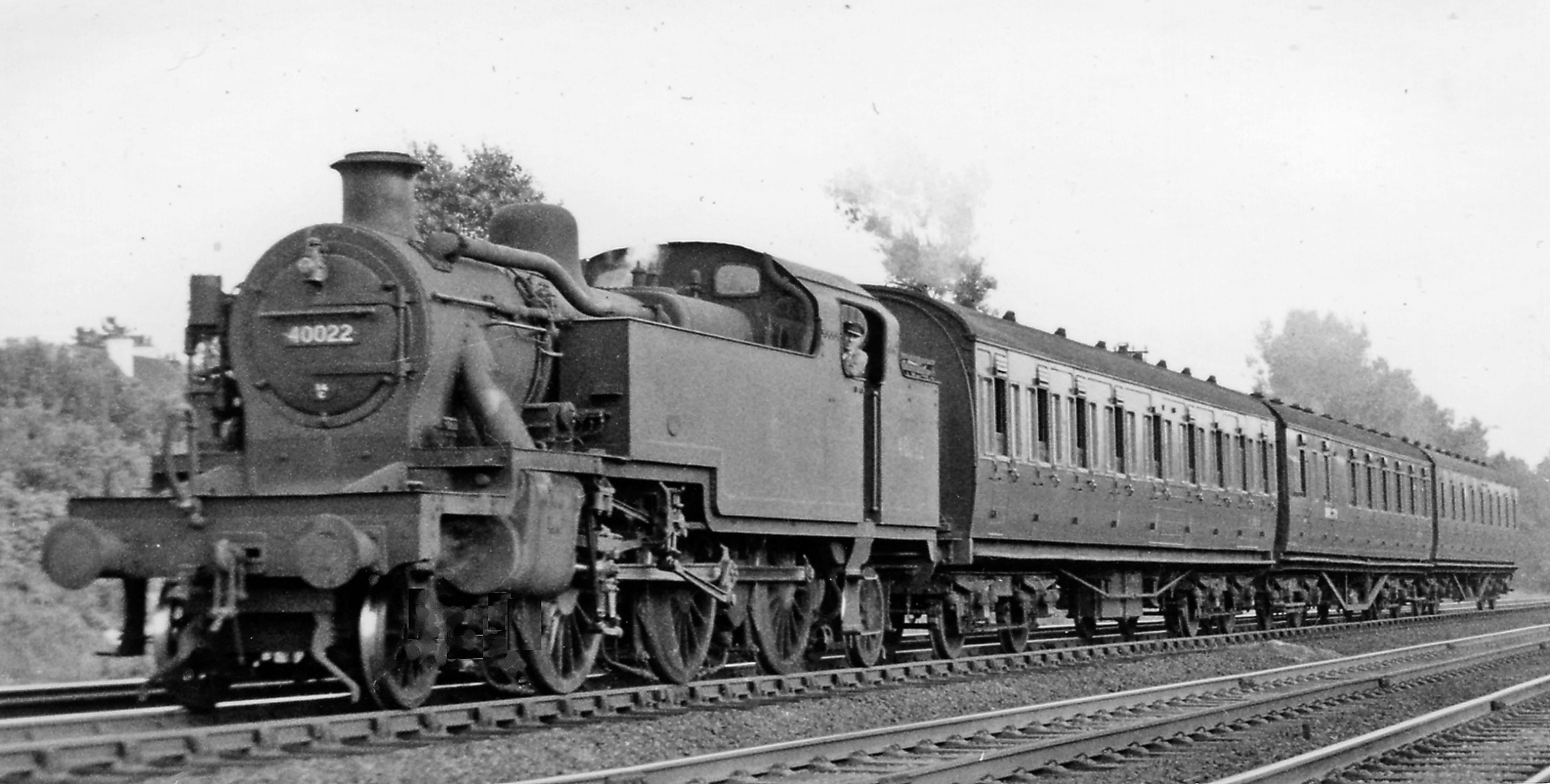
- 40022 near Radlett on the St Pancras - Leicester line
Type and origin
- Power type: Steam
- Designer: Sir Henry Fowler
- Builder: LMS Derby Works
- Build date: 1930–1932
- Total produced: 70
Specifications
- Configuration
  - Whyte: 2-6-2T
  - UIC: 1′C1′ h2t
- Gauge: 4 ft 8 1/2 in (1,435 mm) standard gauge
- Leading dia.: 3 ft 3 1/2 in (1.003 m)
- Driver dia.: 5 ft 3 in (1.600 m)
- Trailing dia.: 3 ft 3 1/2 in (1.003 m)
- Wheelbase: 33 ft 3 in (10.13 m)
- Length: 41 ft 11 3/4 in (12.795 m)
- Loco weight: 70.5 long tons (71.6 t; 79.0 short tons); 71.8 long tons (73.0 t; 80.4 short tons) with condensing apparatus
- Fuel type: Coal
- Fuel capacity: 3 long tons (3.0 t; 3.4 short tons)
- Water cap.: 1,500 imp gal (6,800 L; 1,800 US gal)
- Firebox
  - Grate area: 17.5 sq ft (1.63 m^{2})
- Boiler: LMS type G6S
- Boiler pressure: 200 lbf/in^{2} (1.4 MPa)
- Heating surface
  - Firebox: 104 sq ft (9.7 m^{2})
  - Tubes: 691 sq ft (64.2 m^{2})
- Superheater
  - Heating area: 173 sq ft (16.1 m^{2}) or 186 sq ft (17.3 m^{2})
- Cylinders: Two, outside
- Cylinder size: 17 1/2 in × 26 in (444 mm × 660 mm)
Performance figures
- Tractive effort: 21,486 lbf (95.57 kN)
Career
- Operators: London, Midland and Scottish Railway; → British Railways
- Power class: LMS: 3P; BR: 3MT
- Numbers: LMS 15500–15569; → LMS 1–70 (1934); → BR 40001–40070
- Withdrawn: 1959–1962
- Disposition: All scrapped

The London, Midland and Scottish Railway (LMS) Fowler 2-6-2T was a class of steam locomotive. The LMS classified them 3P, BR 3MT. All were built at Derby Works between 1930 and 1932. William Stanier used them to form the basis for the LMS Stanier 2-6-2T, which was essentially a taper boilered version.

== Numbering ==
They were initially numbered 15500–15569, but from 1934 were renumbered 1–70. After nationalisation in 1948 British Railways added 40000 on to their numbers to number them 40001–70.

Numbers			Lot Number	Date built
Original	LMS 1934	BR	Lot Number	Date built
15500–20	1–21	40001–21	21	1930
15521–49	22–50	40022–50	29	1931
15550–69	51–70	40051–70	20	1932

== Variations ==
Numbers 15520–39 (later 21–40 and 40021–40) were fitted with condensing apparatus to work around London. Some of the non-condensing ones were fitted with vacuum operated pull and push control.

== Withdrawal ==
All were withdrawn between 1959 and 1962. None were preserved.

Table of withdrawals
Year	Quantity in service at start of year	Quantity withdrawn	Locomotive numbers
1959	70	32	40002/04–05/08/13/17/19/21/23/25/27/30/39–40/43–48/52/55–56/58–61/65–69.
1960	38	9	40011–12/14/28/36/41/57/62/70.
1961	29	22	40001/03/07/10/15–16/18/20/29/32–35/37–38/42/49–51/53–54/64.
1962	7	7	40006/09/22/24/26/31/63.
