= LMS Stanier 2-6-2T =

British steam locomotive class (1935–1962)

LMS Stanier Class 3P 2-6-2T
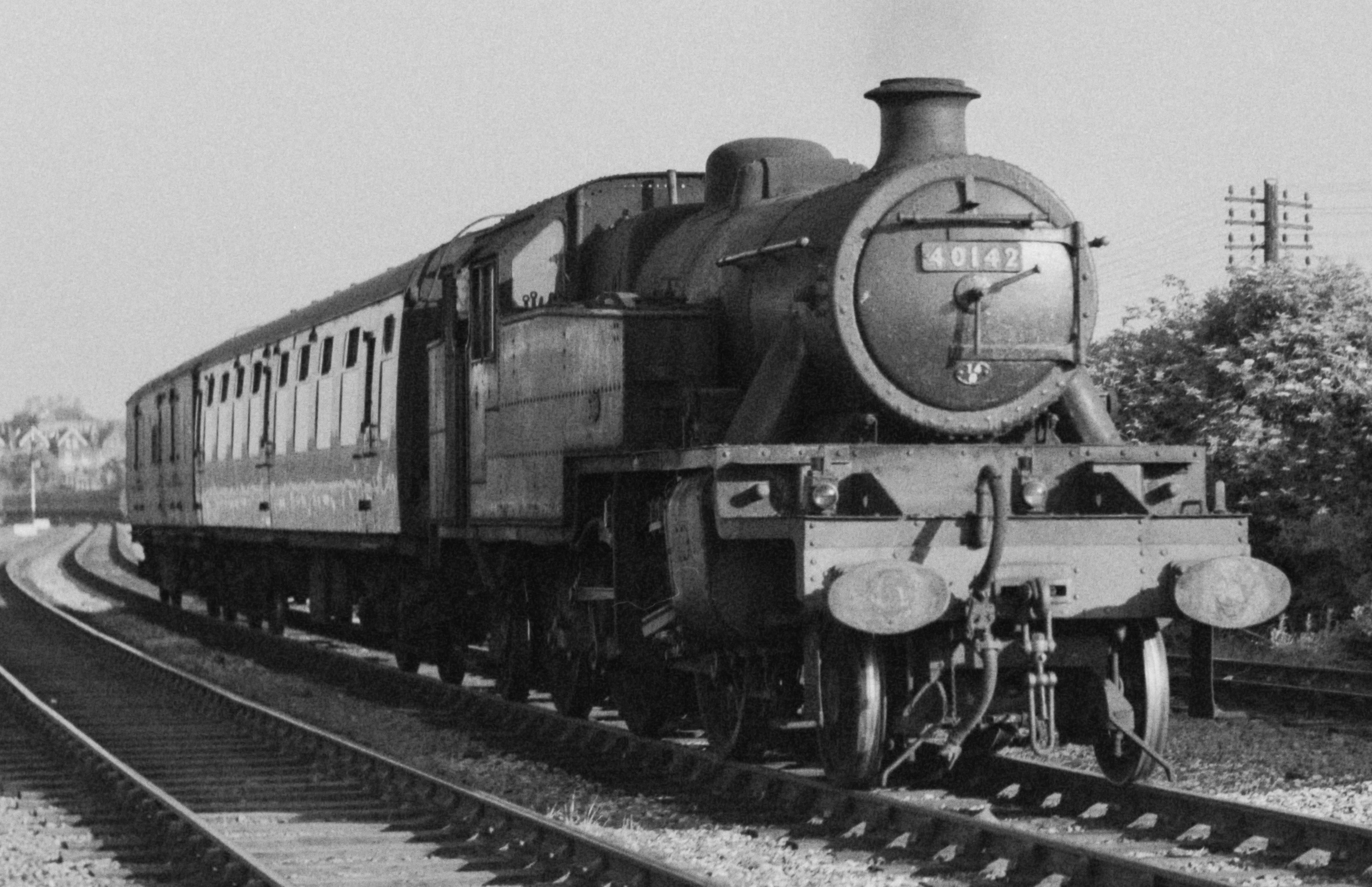
- 40142 in service at London Cricklewood, June 1960
Type and origin
- Power type: Steam
- Designer: William Stanier
- Builder: LMS Derby Works (114); LMS Crewe Works (25)
- Build date: 1935–1938
- Total produced: 139
Specifications
- Configuration
  - Whyte: 2-6-2T
  - UIC: 1′C1′ h2t
- Gauge: 4 ft 8 1/2 in (1,435 mm) standard gauge
- Leading dia.: 3 ft 3 1/2 in (1.003 m)
- Driver dia.: 5 ft 3 in (1.600 m)
- Trailing dia.: 3 ft 3 1/2 in (1.003 m)
- Wheelbase: 33 ft 3 in (10.13 m)
- Length: 41 ft 11 3/4 in (12.80 m)
- Loco weight: w/ 6 boiler: 70.75 long tons (71.89 t; 79.24 short tons); w/ 6A boiler: 71.25 long tons (72.39 t; 79.80 short tons); w/ 6B boiler: 72.5 long tons (73.7 t; 81.2 short tons)
- Fuel type: Coal
- Fuel capacity: 3 long tons (3.05 t; 3.36 short tons)
- Water cap.: 1,500 imp gal (6,800 L; 1,800 US gal)
- Firebox
  - Grate area: 71–120: 17 1/2 sq ft (1.63 m^{2}); Remainder: 19 1/4 sq ft (1.79 m^{2})
- Boiler: LMS type 6 (71–144); LMS type 6A (145–209); LMS type 6B (6 off)
- Boiler pressure: 200 lbf/in^{2} (1.38 MPa)
- Heating surface
  - Firebox: 71–120: 104 sq ft (9.7 m^{2}); 121–144: 107 sq ft (9.9 m^{2}); 6A boiler: 107 sq ft (9.9 m^{2}); 6B boiler: 111 sq ft (10.3 m^{2})
  - Tubes and flues: 71–120: 775 sq ft (72.0 m^{2}); 121–144: 859 sq ft (79.8 m^{2}); 6A boiler: 939 sq ft (87.2 m^{2}); 6B boiler: 997 sq ft (92.6 m^{2})
- Superheater
  - Heating area: 6 boiler: 73 sq ft (6.8 m^{2}) to 76 sq ft (7.1 m^{2}); 6A boiler: 74 sq ft (6.9 m^{2}) to 80 sq ft (7.4 m^{2}); 6B boiler: 138 sq ft (12.8 m^{2}) to 137 sq ft (12.7 m^{2})
- Cylinders: Two, outside
- Cylinder size: 17 1/2 in × 26 in (444 mm × 660 mm)
- Valve gear: Walschaerts
- Valve type: piston valves
Performance figures
- Tractive effort: 21,485 lbf (95.57 kN)
Career
- Operators: London, Midland and Scottish Railway; → British Railways
- Power class: LMS: 3P; BR: 3MT
- Numbers: LMS: 71–209; BR: 40071–40209
- Withdrawn: 1959–1962
- Disposition: All scrapped

The Stanier Class 3P 2-6-2T was a class of London, Midland and Scottish Railway (LMS) steam locomotive. They were designed by William Stanier based on the earlier LMS Fowler 2-6-2T.

== Overview ==
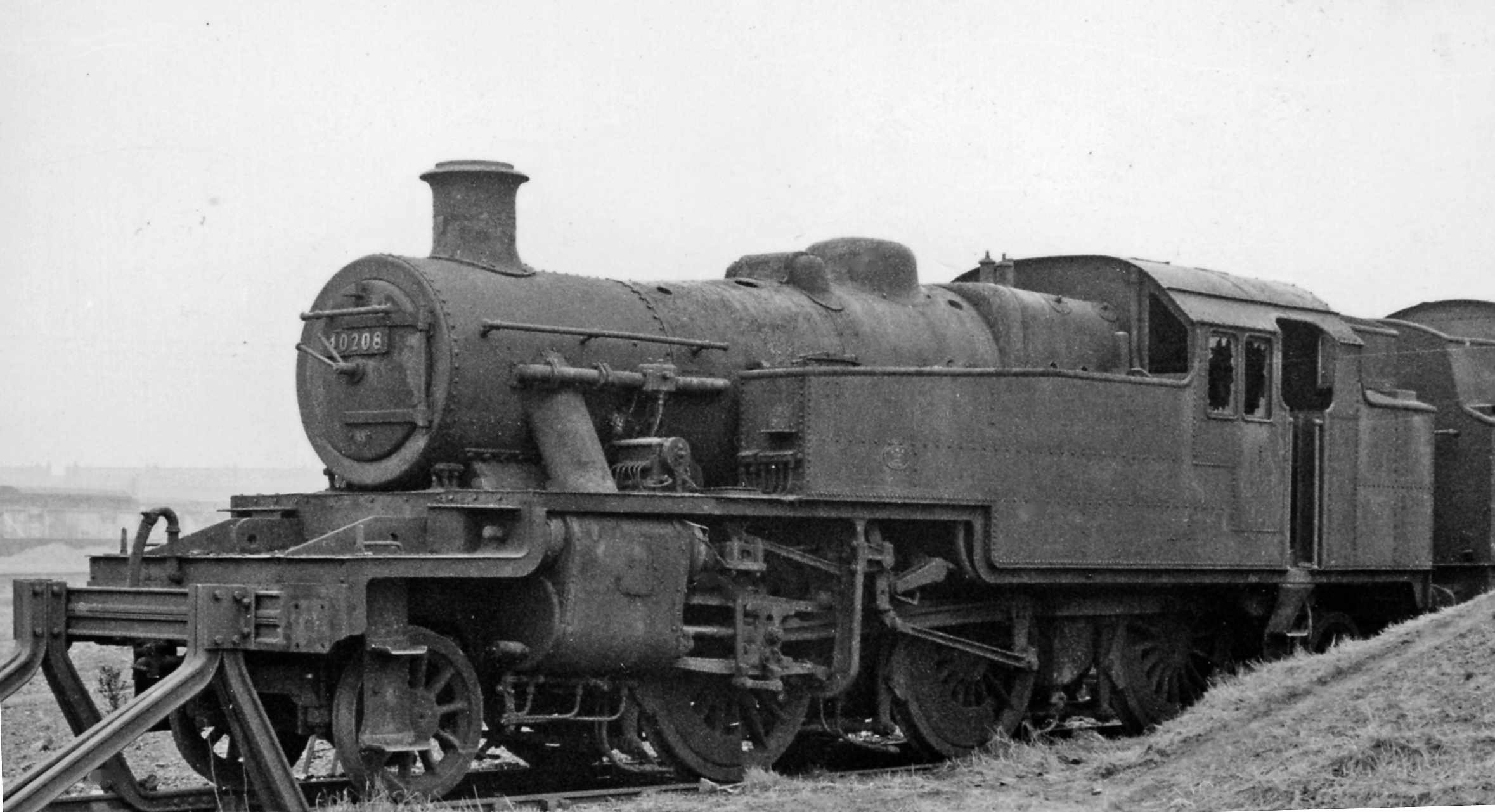
Withdrawn 40208 stored at Trafford Park locomotive depot, April 1962

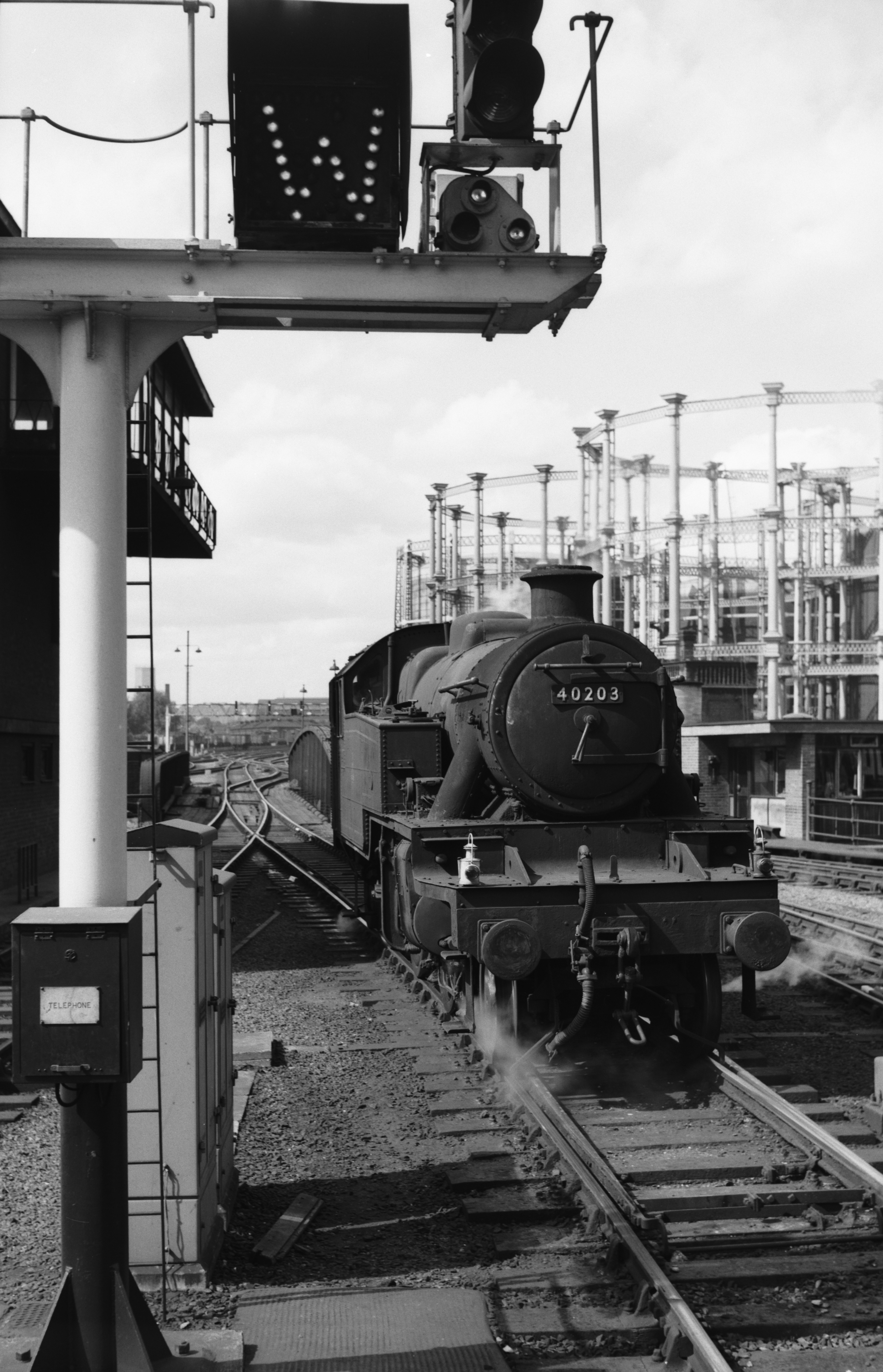
Large boilered rebuild of Stanier 2-6-2

A taper-boiler versions of Henry Fowler's 1930 design, the general dimensions were the same with some improvements. They were under-boilered and although improved they were always considered to be indifferent performers. In some ways they were inferior to their predecessors. The cab was of Stanier's usual excellent design with the coal bunker built higher than the rear cab windows but angled inwards to avoid them, thus giving good visibility when running bunker first.

The first 2 lots (117 and 126, locomotives 71–144) were built with number 6 domeless boilers but the rest were built with improved 6A boilers with separate top-feed and steam dome. Both types of boilers were later modified to carry Adams ‘Vortex’ blastpipe to improve steaming. These locomotives could always be identified by the larger diameter chimney.

The 139 locomotives were numbered 71–209 by the LMS, and after 1948 BR renumbered them 40071–209. The LMS classified them 3P.

In a final attempt to improve the locomotives, six were rebuilt with larger 6B boilers; these were 169 in 1940, 163 in 1941, 148 and 203 in 1942, and 40142 and 40167 in 1956. The re-boilering was not considered to be cost effective.

They were to be found on various duties – stopping train, suburban passenger routes, branch line, empty stock and banking.

They are generally considered to be the least successful of Stanier's standard designs.

== Detail ==
| Numbers | | Lot numbers | Date built | Built at |
| LMS | BR | Lot numbers | Date built | Built at |
|---|---|---|---|---|
| 71–90 | 40071–90 | 117 | 1935 | Derby |
| 91–144 | 40091–144 | 126 | 1935 | Derby |
| 145–72 | 40145–72 | 139 | 1937 | Derby |
| 173–84 | 40173–84 | 139 | 1938 | Derby |
| 185–95 | 40185–95 | 140 | 1937 | Crewe |
| 196–209 | 40196–209 | 140 | 1938 | Crewe |

== Withdrawals ==
The class was withdrawn between November 1959 and December 1962, with the last of the large boiler variant (40148) having been withdrawn in September 1962. None were preserved.

Table of withdrawals
| Year | Quantity in service at start of year | Quantity withdrawn | Locomotive numbers |
|---|---|---|---|
| 1959 | 139 | 10 | 40084/96, 40125/27/39/60/63/69/72, 40204. |
| 1960 | 129 | 4 | 40161, 40502–07. |
| 1961 | 125 | 56 | 40071/74–77/79/81/91–92/94–95/97, 40101–03/07–08/11/15/18/21/23–24/26/29–34/36/40–44/55–56/62/65–68/71/75/78/82–84/92/94–95/99, 40208–09. |
| 1962 | 69 | 69 | 40072–73/78/80/82–83/85–90/93/98–99, 40100/04–06/09–10/12–14/16–17/19–20/22/28/35/37–38/45–48/50–54/57–59/64/70/73–74/76–77/79–81/85–91/93/96–98, 40200–03. |
