= Butterfly World, Isle of Wight =

Butterfly World
- Butterfly World's logo

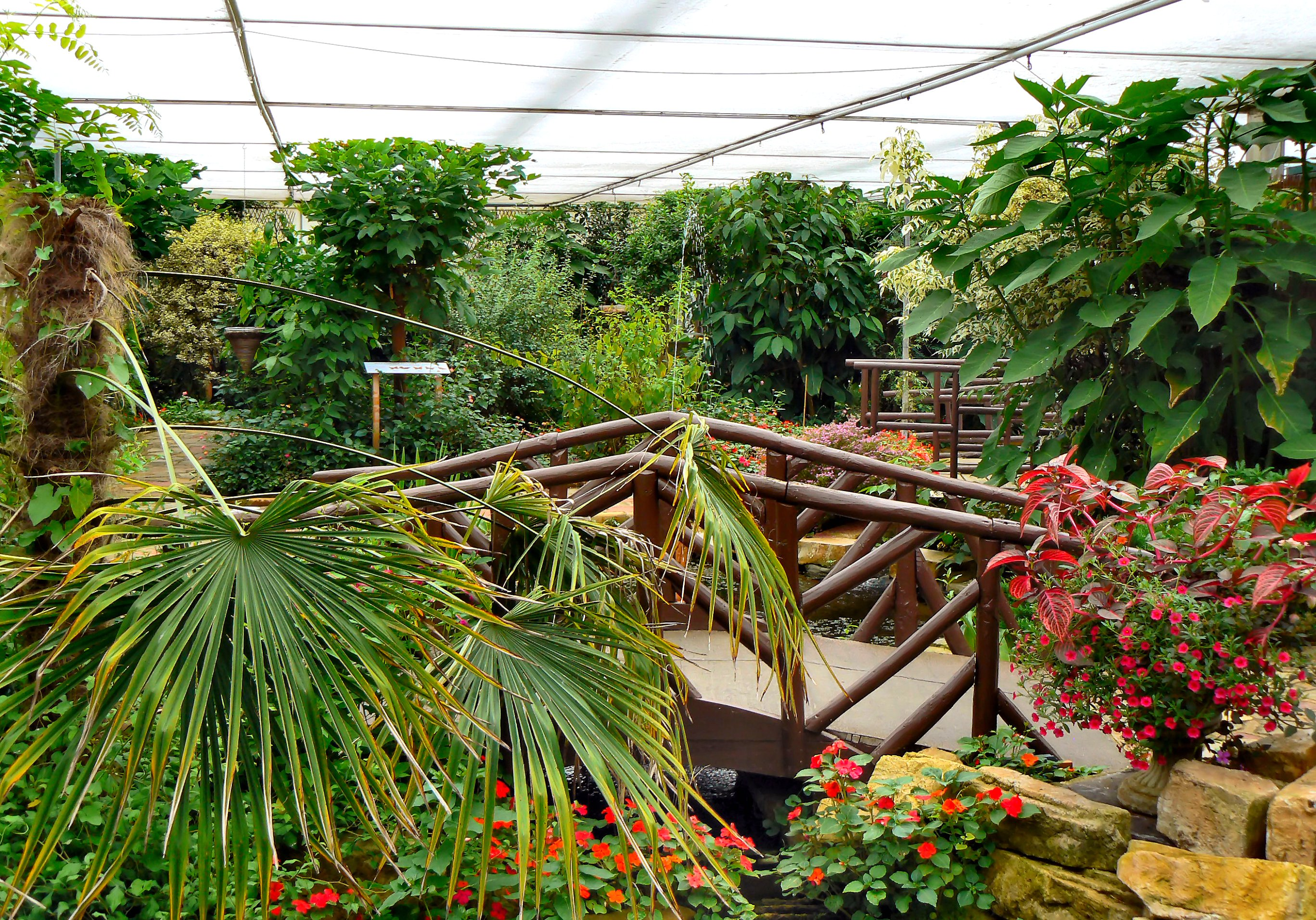
- Interactive map of Butterfly World
- 50.71127°N 1.25447°W
- Date opened: 1983
- Location: Isle of Wight
- Website: https://butterflyworldiow.com/

Butterfly World is a butterfly zoo located on the Isle of Wight.

It opened on 1 May 1983 as part of the Medina Garden Centre, becoming the first butterfly farm opened in a UK garden centre, and the fifth Butterfly farm in the world.

It includes an indoor sub-tropical garden with free-flying butterflies.
