= George Ivatt =

English locomotive engineer (1886–1972)

- Born: 4 May 1886; Dublin, Ireland
- Died: 4 October 1972 (aged 86)
- Education: Uppingham School
- Spouse: Dorothy Harrison
- Parent: Henry Ivatt
- Engineering career
- Discipline: Locomotive engineering

Henry George Ivatt (4 May 1886 – 4 October 1972), known as George Ivatt, was the post-war Chief Mechanical Engineer of the London Midland and Scottish Railway. He was the son of the Great Northern Railway locomotive engineer Henry Ivatt. George Ivatt was born in Dublin, Ireland, and educated at Uppingham School, England. He married Dorothy Sarah Harrison (1881-1962) in 1913.

== Career ==
In 1904, he started an apprenticeship at the Crewe Works of the London and North Western Railway (LNWR). After working in the drawing office, he became head of experimental locomotive work. He was appointed as Assistant Foreman at Crewe North Shed in 1909, and a year later became Assistant Outdoor Machinery Superintendent.

=== North Staffordshire Railway ===
During the 1914–1918 World War I Ivatt served on the staff of the Director of Transport in France. After the war, he became Assistant Locomotive Superintendent of the North Staffordshire Railway (NSR) at Stoke-on-Trent in 1919.

=== London, Midland and Scottish Railway ===
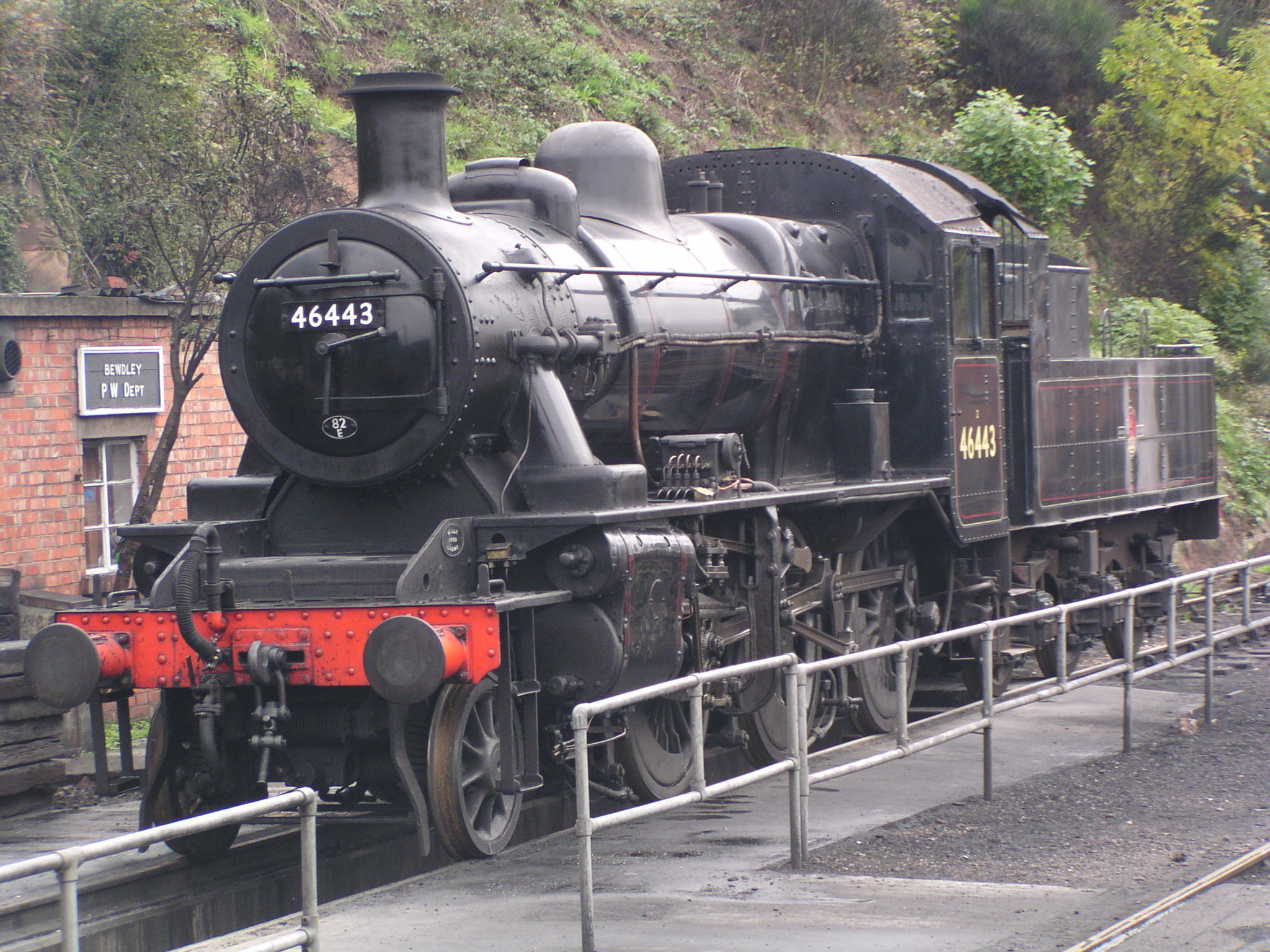
LMS Ivatt Class 2 2-6-0

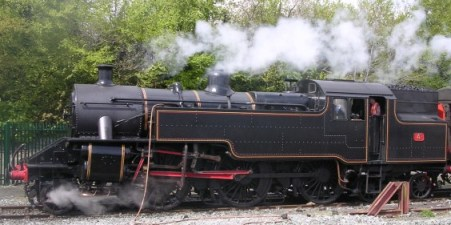
Northern Counties Committee WT Class loco no 4

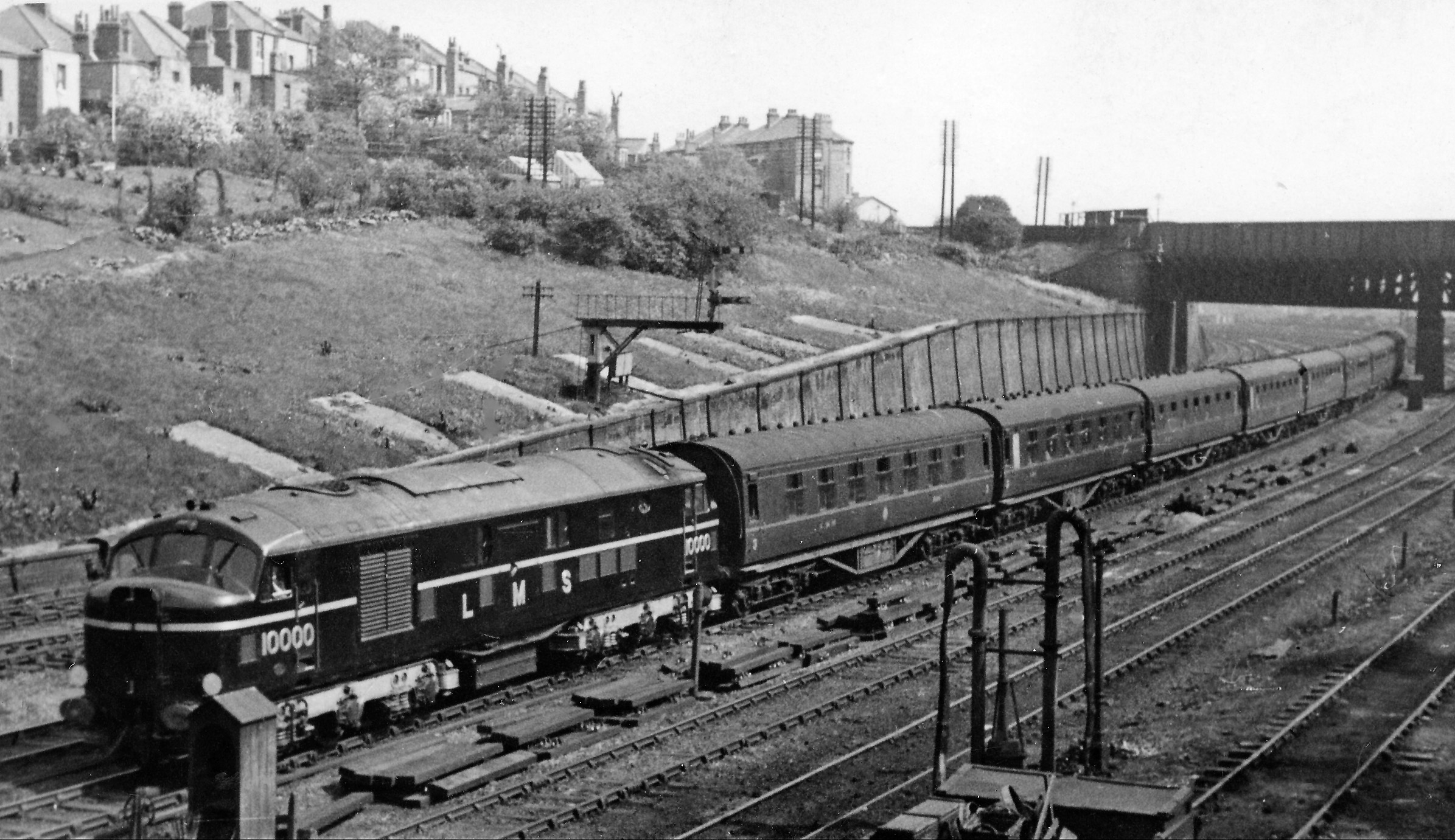
LMS 10000 at Cricklewood in 1948

Under the Railways Act 1921, the NSR was absorbed (in 1923) into the London, Midland and Scottish Railway (LMS). He was transferred to Derby Works in 1928 and appointed Locomotive Works Superintendent in 1931. At the end of 1932 Ivatt moved to Glasgow, becoming Divisional Mechanical Engineer, Scotland. He returned to England in 1937 as Principal Assistant for Locomotives to the Chief Mechanical Engineer (CME), William Stanier.

Stanier retired in 1944 and was succeeded as CME by Charles Fairburn. When Fairburn died suddenly in October 1945, a new shortlist was prepared and George Ivatt, the senior candidate, with significant LMS locomotive experience, was appointed CME on 1 February 1946. Robert Riddles, the other notable candidate for the post, was promoted to the board as Vice-President of the LMS.

As CME in post-war austerity Britain, Ivatt continued to build standard existing LMS locomotive types for which parts were readily available. Two additional LMS Princess Coronation Class 4-6-2 express locomotives were built and several modified Black Fives and the work of 'rebuilding' the Royal Scot and Patriot classes continued. The LMS Ivatt Class 4 2-6-0 was introduced as well as the notable "Mickey Mouse" LMS Ivatt Class 2 2-6-0 and LMS Ivatt Class 2 2-6-2T, built to replace life expired 19th century branch line 0-6-0 and motor train 2-4-2T locomotive types, and the Class WT 2-6-4T locomotives for the Northern Counties Committee. The famous Ivatt twins, diesel-electric locomotives numbered 10000 and 10001, built by the LMS at Derby in association with English Electric were Britain's first main-line diesel locomotives and were designed to operate singly or in pairs.

=== British Railways ===
On nationalisation in 1948, Riddles became CME of British Railways, whilst Ivatt remained as CME of the London Midland Region until his retirement in 1951.

=== Brush Bagnall Traction ===
From mid-1951 Ivatt was a consultant and director of Brush Bagnall Traction, later becoming their General Manager. He retired as a director in 1957 but was retained as a consultant until 1964. Following the demise of Brush Bagnall Traction, Ivatt became a director of Brush Traction where he was involved with the building of the Brush Type 2 locomotives.

Business positions
Preceded by Charles Fairburn	Chief Mechanical Engineer of the London, Midland and Scottish Railway; 1946–1947	Succeeded by Robert Riddles as CME of British Railways
