= Derby Type 4 =

Derby Type 4 may refer to:

- British Rail Class 44
- British Rail Class 45
- British Rail Class 46
