= 44 class =

44 class or Class 44 may refer to:

- British Rail Class 44
- DRG Class 44
- New South Wales 44 class locomotive
