= Multiple working =

Several locomotives running with a single driver

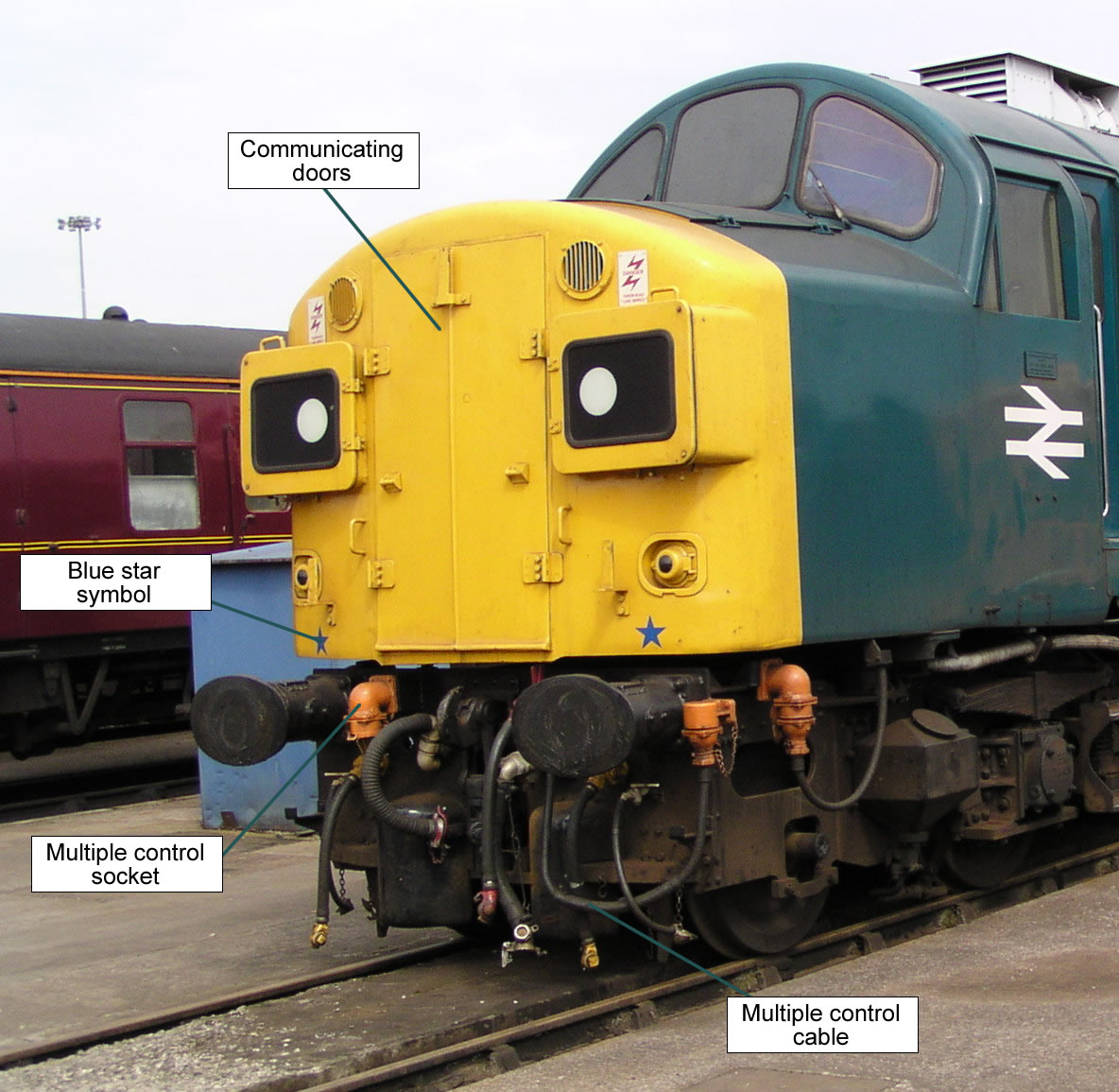
Blue Star multiple working equipment on a Class 40 locomotive

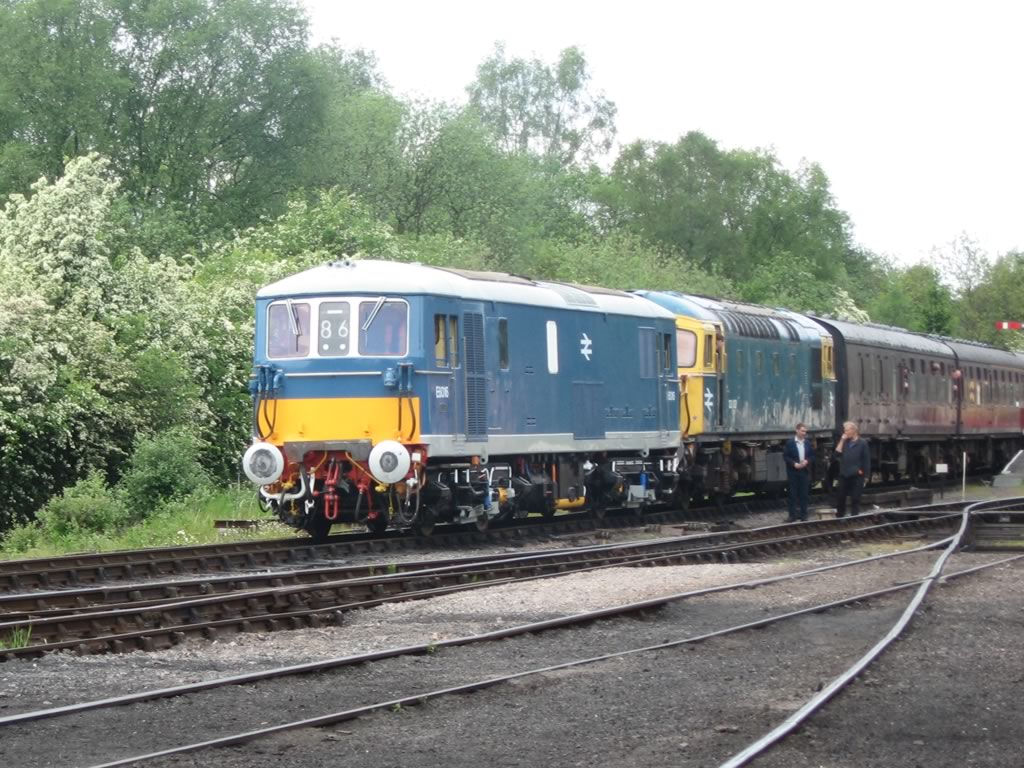
A Class 73 and a Class 33 locomotive being coupled for multiple working

On the rail network in Great Britain, multiple working is where two or more traction units (locomotives, diesel multiple units or electric multiple units) are coupled together in such a way that they are all under the control of one driver (multiple-unit train control).

If the front locomotive of a pair in multiple has failed the driver can still control the rear locomotive for as long as air and electricity supplies are available on the failed locomotive.

Many main-line diesel-electric and hydraulic locomotives are capable of running in multiples of up to three under the control of one driver

— British Railways Diesel Traction Manual for Enginemen,

"In tandem" is when more than one diesel or electric locomotive are hauling a single train and under the control of a driver on each locomotive.

== Locomotives ==
In the early days of diesel locomotives in the 1960s, locomotives worked within their class (i.e. two locomotives of the same class could work together but not with other classes). Locomotives from different manufacturers had varying methods of controlling engines or braking systems. If a train required more than one locomotive, an additional driver was needed, at extra expense.

Since then, locomotives have been built to work with other locomotives in the same code or system. Similar systems are assigned a coupling code, which is normally indicated on the front of the locomotive.

Early diesels were also fitted with communicating doors in the nose which allowed the secondman to access the train heating boiler of the rearmost locomotive. The doors actually saw little use and, as they frequently caused draughts in the cab, many of them were later welded shut.

Coupling code	System	Class of locomotives
★ Blue Star	Electro-pneumatic	Class 15, Class 17 (Nos D8588–8616), Class 20, Class 21 (Nos D6138-6157), Class 24, Class 25, Class 26, Class 27, Class 31/1, Class 33, Class 37, Class 40, Class 44, Class 45, Class 46, Class 73 (under diesel power only), Class 74 (under diesel power only)
● Red Circle	Electro-magnetic	Class 16, Class 21 (Nos D6100-6137), Class 28, Class 29, Class 31/0
● Green Circle		Some Class 47s
■ Orange Square	Diesel hydraulic - 1st use	Class 22 (D6300 - 6305), Class 41 (Warship Class)
■ Orange Square	Symbol re-used for different system	Class 50
◆ Red Diamond		Class D16/1 (nos 10000/10001); Class 17 (D8500–D8587)
◆ Red Diamond	Symbol re-used for different system	Class 56, Class 58
◆ White Diamond	Diesel hydraulic	Class 22 (D6306 - 6357), Class 42, Class 43 (Warship Class)
▲ Yellow Triangle	Diesel hydraulic	Class 35
	SR EMU System	Class 33/1, Class 73, Class 74, Mark One Electric Multiple Units, Class 442, Class 489
	AC electric locomotives	Class 87, some Class 86s
	Within own class only	Class 43 (HST), Class 60, some Class 68s
	TDM System	Class 86, Class 87, Class 89, Class 90, Class 91, Push-Pull fitted Class 47, DBSO, DVT
	AAR System	59, 66, 67, 68 008–015, 69, 70, and 73/9, plus several converted DVTs

== Multiple units ==
=== First-generation ===
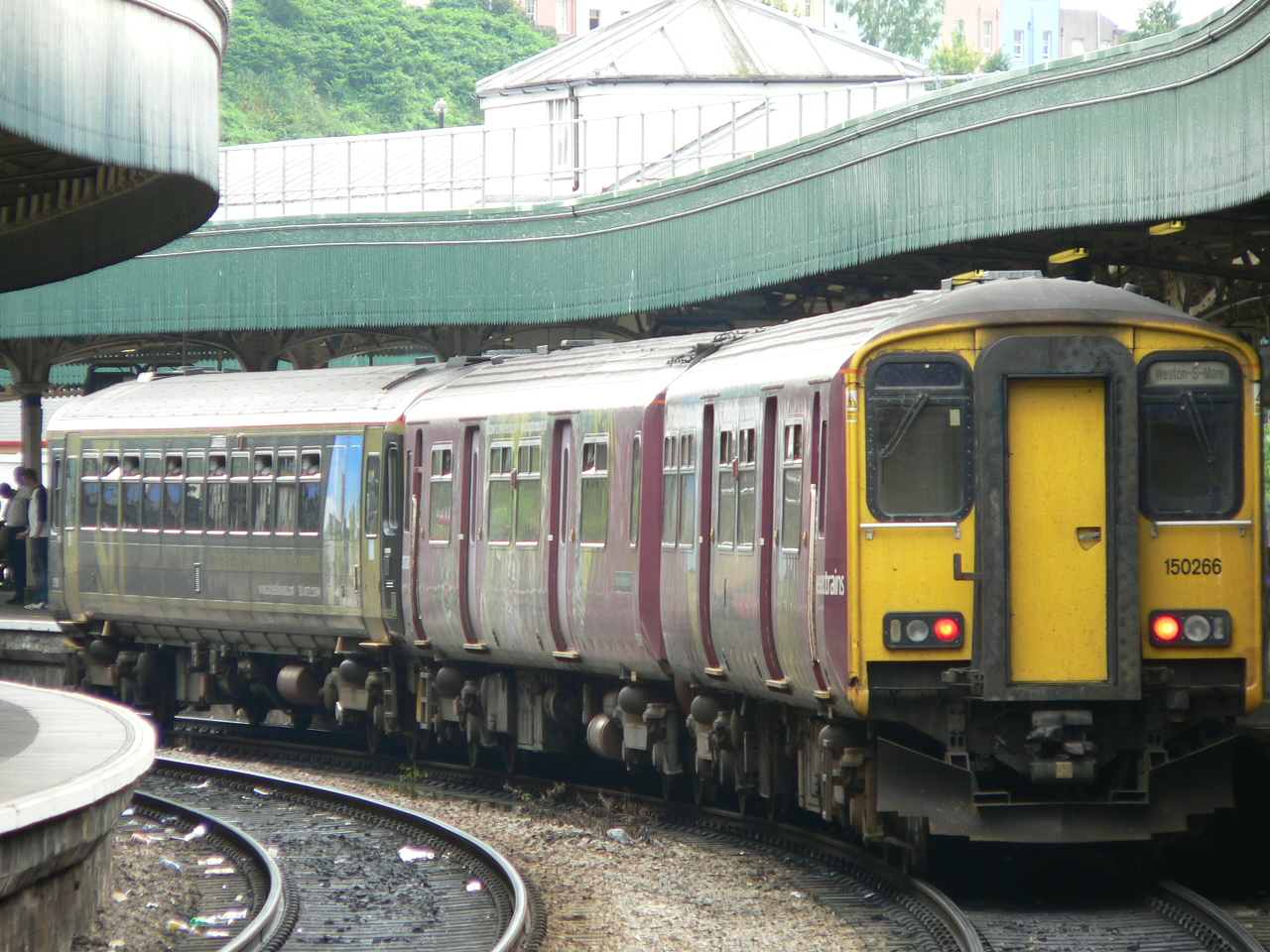
Class 153 and Class 150 working in multiple

First-generation diesel multiple units had the additional problem of differing types of transmission. For instance, a Class 127 unit (hydraulic transmission) could be required to work in multiple with a Class 112 unit (mechanical transmission). For this reason, the drive selector on the Class 127 was fitted with positions marked "D, 3, 2, 1" to change the gears when working in formation with vehicles with mechanical transmission. However, because of damage to mechanical transmissions caused by improper gear selection on coupled hydraulic units, the Class 127 units had their coupling code changed from Blue Square to Red Triangle, which differed from Blue Square in name only and was unrelated to an earlier Red Triangle code used for the Derby Lightweight hydraulics.

First-generation DMU coupling codes:

Coupling code	Class
■ Blue Square	Most units with mechanical transmission, Class 113, Class 127 (until 1969)
◆ Yellow Diamond	Derby Lightweight (mechanical transmission), Metro-Cammell Lightweight, Class 129
▲ Red Triangle (1st use)	Derby Lightweight (hydraulic transmission)
★ Orange Star	Class 125
● White Circle	Class 126
▲ Red Triangle (2nd use)	Class 127 (from 1969)

=== Second-generation ===
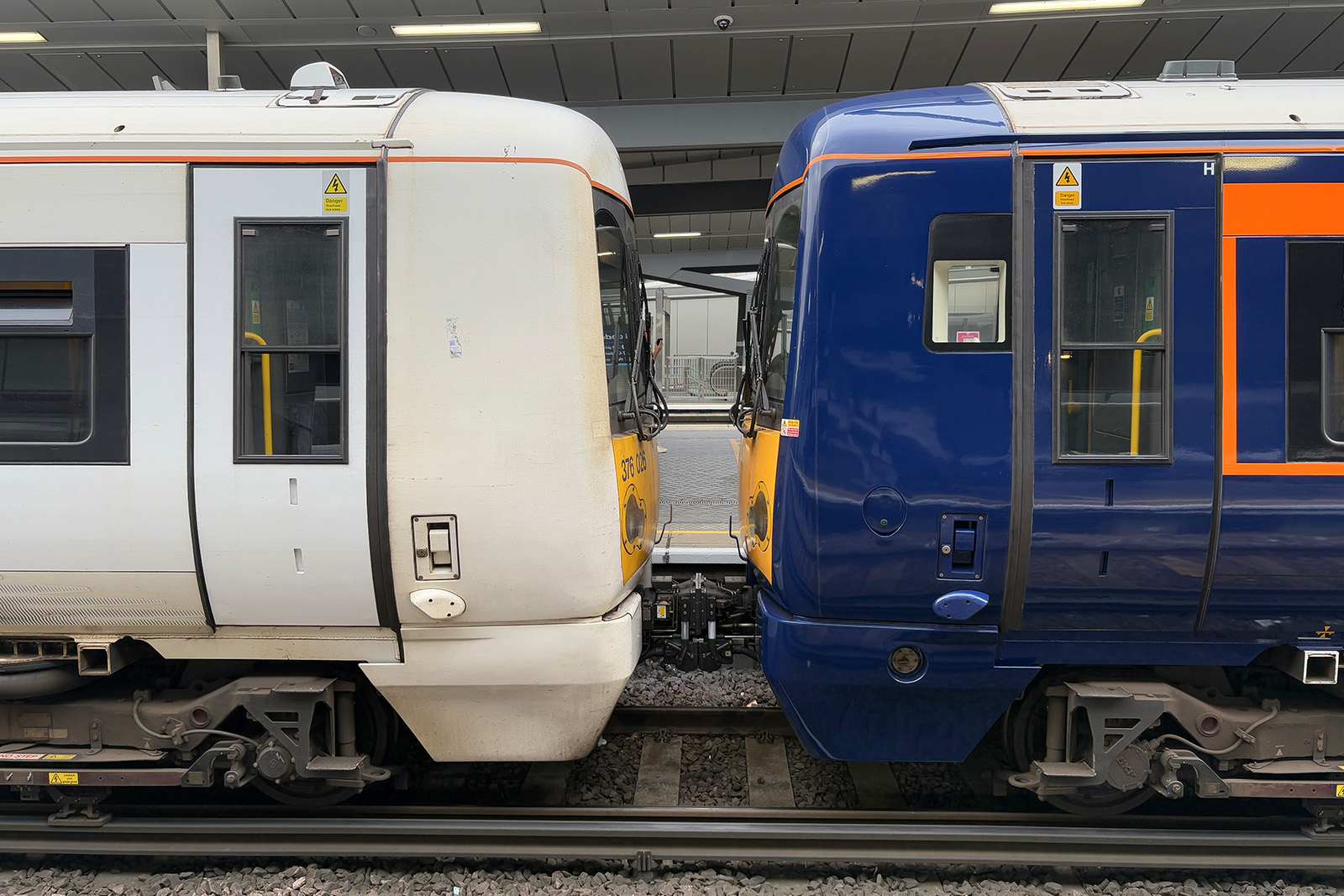
Two Class 376 units coupled for multiple working

Most second-generation units built by British Rail were designed to use the BSI multiple working system, including members of the 14x Pacer and 15x Sprinter families. Some post-privatisation trains such as the Class 168, 170 and 172s were fitted with BSI couplers enabling them to operate in multiple with older stock, while other incompatible systems emerged. Examples included Dellner-couplers fitted to Class 171, 220, 221, 222, 350, 360, 375, 376, 377, 390, 700 and 710s while Scharfenbergs were fitted to Class 175 and 180s. Franchise changes and stock reallocation means that many train operating companies use fleets with a number of incompatible multiple working systems.

== See also ==
- Multiple-unit train control
- Multiple unit

== References and sources ==
=== Sources ===
- Williams, Alan; Percival, David (1977). British Railways Locomotives and Multiple Units including Preserved Locomotives 1977. Shepperton: Ian Allan. ISBN 0-7110-0751-9.
