= Derby Works =

British locomotive manufacturing facilities

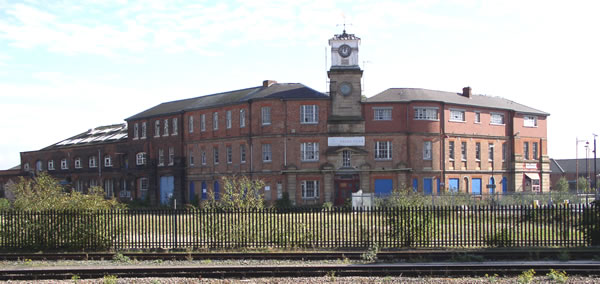
- The North Midland and later Midland workshop in 2006
- Industry: Locomotive manufacturing
- Founded: 1840; 186 years ago
- Headquarters: Derby, England

The Derby Works comprised a number of British manufacturing facilities designing and building locomotives and rolling stock in Derby, England. The first of these was a group of three maintenance sheds opened around 1840 behind Derby station. This developed into a manufacturing facility called the Midland Railway Locomotive Works, known locally as "the loco" and in 1873 manufacturing was split into locomotive and rolling stock manufacture, with rolling stock work transferred to a new facility, Derby Carriage & Wagon Works.

From its earliest days, it had carried out research and development in a number of areas, and in 1933 the London, Midland and Scottish Railway opened the LMS Scientific Research Laboratory. Around 1964, this became part of a new British Rail Research Division, based in the purpose-built Railway Technical Centre, which also housed the Department of Mechanical & Electrical Engineering (DM&EE) and later the headquarters of British Rail Engineering Limited.

== Early days ==
Around 1840, the North Midland Railway, the Midland Counties Railway and the Birmingham and Derby Railway set up workshops to the rear of Derby station. Although the Midland Counties had an engine house at Nottingham, the main facilities for all three lines appear to have been, initially at least, those at Derby. That for the Birmingham and Derby was next to its line, near London Road. It was about 140 feet (43 m) long and 43 feet (13 m) wide, with three lines and three wide archways at its entrance, supporting a water tank. In one corner was a smithy. The Midland Counties' shed was rectangular and about 800 feet (240 m) long to the north of the site. Adjacent to it were water and coke facilities, and locomotive repair workshops. The North Midland's became a full repair facility, with a smithy, lathes and other machine tools. These were associated with what is believed to be the first Roundhouse, designed by Francis Thompson. On each side of it, in a vee, were workshops for locomotive and rolling stock repair.

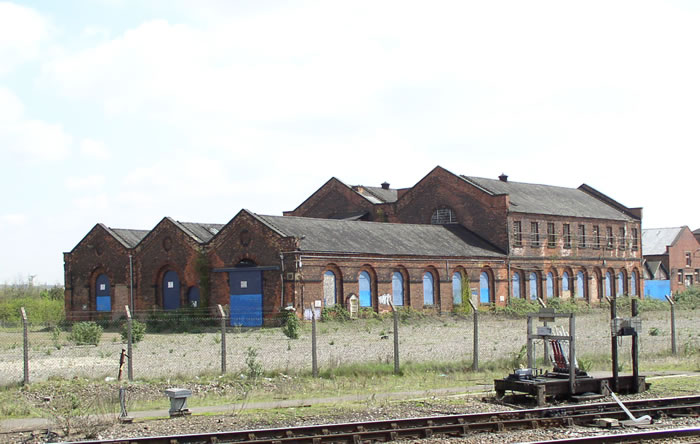
The Midland Counties Railway workshop in 2006

In 1841, problems were becoming apparent with the heat of the exhaust gases through the fireboxes of the locomotives, and the North Midland works assisted George Stephenson in the design of his Long Boiler locomotive In the same year, the Midland Counties locomotive Bee (formerly Ariel) was fitted with Samuel Hills Smoke Consuming Apparatus in an attempt to conform to the Government's insistence that they should consume their own smoke. This experimentation was carried on with the use of a brick arch in the firebox to use the cheaper coal instead of coke, but it was initially unsuccessful.

== Midland Railway ==
=== Matthew Kirtley ===
When the three companies merged in 1844 to form the Midland Railway, Derby became its headquarters and the workshops merged to become the Midland Railway Locomotive Works. The immediate task was to achieve some standardisation in the various locomotives that it had inherited. Locomotives at that time were designed and built by manufacturers who might be lacking in actual operating experience with their products. The first Locomotive and Carriage Superintendent was Matthew Kirtley who persuaded various manufacturers to build to his own design and in 1849 50 six-coupled goods engines were delivered.

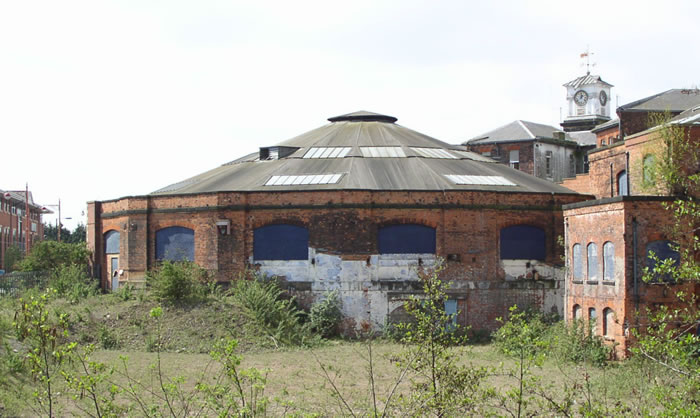
North Midland Railway roundhouse in 2006

After improving the workshops and facilities, including a second roundhouse in 1847, he persuaded the directors that the railway should build its own engines. New building began in 1851 with passenger engines to the Jenny Lind pattern, and more standard goods. He then produced a large "single" with six-foot six-inch driving wheels. Throughout its existence the Midland never became fully self-sufficient, usually having its locos built by private contractors to its own designs. Initially there was some resistance on the part of Sharp Stewart and Stephenson, who quoted over-long delivery times, so that Kirtley had to accept the maker's own designs. These were good enough, however, that Fowler built some more to a similar pattern. In 1861 he built four 0-6-0 banking engines for the Lickey Incline with four-foot drivers instead of the usual five feet. Kirtley's first 2-4-0 was a rebuilt 2-2-2 but he went on to build six for use to King's Cross, then 15 more.

A further, much larger, roundhouse was built in 1852, followed by a large rectangular engine shed with two turntables in 1890. The original North Midland workshop, which by then had become offices, was raised by one storey in 1859–60, the clock tower being increased in height accordingly. A long footbridge was added from the entrance door to the front of the station, of which only a fragment remains today. A third floor was added in 1893.

Another of Kirtley's achievements in 1859 was, at last, to solve the problem of coal burning, by combining the brick arch with a firehole door deflector plate and a blower to increase the draught. Research into track wear was carried out by Robert Forester Mushet, who produced the first double-headed rail using Bessemer steel. Whereas wrought iron rails lasted typically six months, a length of steel rail laid near Derby station 1857 was still in use in 1873.

Kirtley also introduced a system of templates and gauges based on the Whitworth system. Meanwhile, wrought iron axles failures were a problem. In 1870–1871, Kirtley began a programme of research which eventually resulted in the introduction of steel.

By the end of the 1860s the works had expanded to such an extent, that he was considering reorganising it; and, in 1873, it separated into the Locomotive Works, remaining behind the station, and Derby Carriage & Wagon Works, further south, off Litchurch Lane.

=== Samuel Johnson ===
Kirtley died in office in 1873 leaving a respectable legacy of development and sound locomotives, some of which lasted 80 years. The works reorganisation was completed in 1887 by his successor Samuel Waite Johnson, the carriage and wagon works coming under the control of Thomas Gethyn Clayton. In addition the works took over the old Derby Gas Company works.

Johnson continued to build four-coupled passenger locos for the steeper grades, but also some 2-2-2 singles for lighter work. In 1886, the workshop manager, F. Holt, devised a system of applying sand beneath the wheels to improve adhesion. This system is still in use today, using compressed air instead of steam as the propellant.

In 1897 a general strike was followed by a rapid rise in the economy. The railway had placed orders for 170 new locos with private builders, all of whom were snowed under. By the end of 1898 none had been delivered and the railway was under pressure from its goods customers, particularly in Sheffield. The Midland ordered 20 2-6-0s from the Burnham & William's Baldwin Locomotive Works in the United States which were supplied as parts for assembly. Since the workshops were also full, they had to be assembled in the open air by quickly-recruited labour. Wishing to order 20 more, which Baldwin could not supply, ten were ordered from the Schenectady Locomotive Works. The Baldwin's American appearance raised a good deal of comment.

The most famous singles, the Midland Spinners, were built in 1900 and the Belpaire firebox appeared on some 4-4-0s. The first of the "Midland Compounds" appeared in 1904. This was based on a North Eastern Railway two-cylinder 4-4-0 which had been rebuilt to three cylinders, and became the basis for a number of classes over the following years, totalling 240 engines. He also produced a very simple, but robust, 0-6-0 goods engine of which 865 were built from 1875 to 1902.

=== Richard Deeley ===
Johnson retired in 1903 and was succeeded by Richard Deeley who began as an apprentice at the works. He carried on much where Johnson had left off, but improved the compounds with an uprated boiler and firebox, also changing the tender to a smaller six-wheeled design. Deeley was very soon promoted to Locomotive Superintendent, with Cecil Paget as Works Manager.

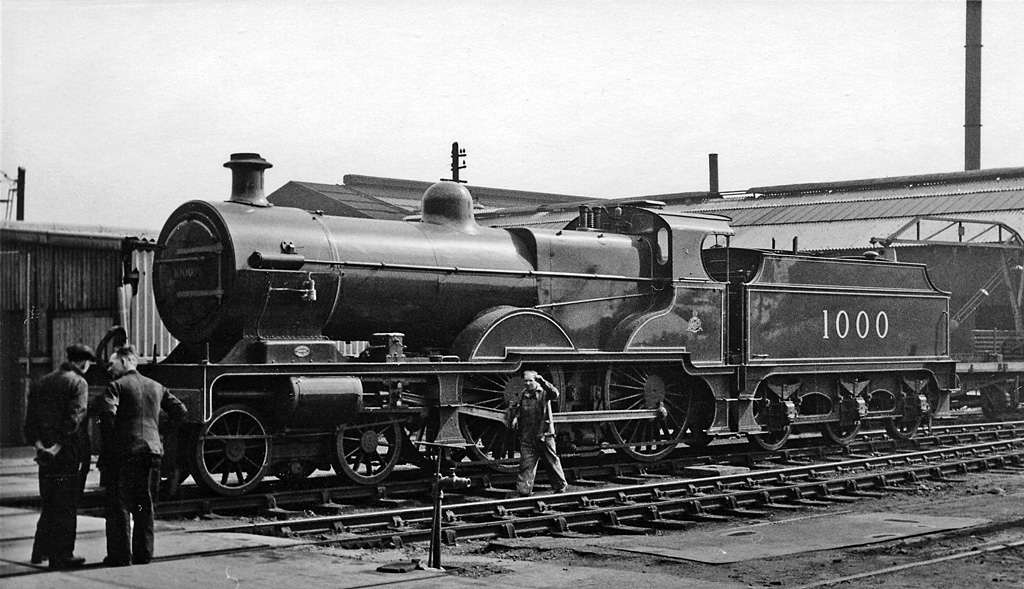
Preserved 4-4-0 Midland Compound No. 1000

In 1904 two steam motor-carriages for the Morecambe-Heysham service were fitted out at the carriage works. Since he was also Locomotive Superintendent, he reorganised the numbering system in 1907 so that different groups of numbers were used for different classes. Among his improvements to the works, he devised a heavy testing rig for structure testing up to 50 tons in what had developed into a dedicated Engineering Testing Department.

By 1900 some 40,000 people were employed, producing 40 new engines a year. Electric power and lighting was installed in the Locomotive Works during 1910, supplied by the company's new generating plant located across the Derby canal at the rear of the Works. An earlier and smaller scale electric generating station had been built by the Midland during March 1893 in Calvert Street, Derby to provide current to light the station offices, the Midland Hotel and the Locomotive Works offices. A textile research facility was opened in Calvert Street for upholstery and seat materials. This facility is thought to have used the buildings made redundant by the closure of the 1893 generating station when the new generating station was brought on line in 1910.

=== Henry Fowler ===
In 1907 Paget became General Superintendent, with Henry Fowler becoming Works Manager. In 1908 Paget caused to be built a revolutionary new locomotive, the Paget locomotive based on the Willans high speed central valve engines, some of which had been installed at the works.

In 1908 the Heysham to Morecambe line was electrified at 6.6kV 25 Hz and Derby supplied three 60-foot long motor coaches with electrical equipment from Siemens and Westinghouse.

In 1909 Henry Fowler became the Mechanical Engineer. For the next five years, rebuilding continued and then came World War I.

From 1914 the works turned to aiding the war effort, producing eleven howitzers by the end of the year. Like most of the other works, Derby produced large number of shells and their components. Initially producing 3000 fuses a week, it installed automated equipment, increasing production tenfold, the work being mainly undertaken by some 500 women.

Some new locomotives, however, were built for the Midland's own use and some for the Midland & Great Northern Joint Committee and the Somerset & Dorset Joint Railway. Notable among them were the Somerset & Dorset 2-8-0s, a class of heavy freight locomotives for the Dorset banks, extremely large by Midland standards. Eleven were built in two batches in 1914 and 1925. A new more powerful 0-6-0 was designed in 1911 and two were built. Quantity production began in 1917 with 192 being built in the first few years, and a further 580 after grouping up to 1940. Another remarkable engine of this period was the 0-10-0 "Lickey Banker", designed in 1919, by James Clayton for use on the Lickey Incline south of Birmingham.

== London, Midland and Scottish Railway ==
=== George Hughes ===
The co-operation between the railways in the war effort to some extent smoothed the way to amalgamation in 1923 with the Midland becoming part of the London, Midland & Scottish Railway. George Hughes became the Chief Mechanical Engineer. However he preferred to make his headquarters at Horwich, building the famous 2-6-0 "Horwich Crabs". He was succeeded in 1925 by Henry Fowler, by Ernest Lemon in 1931, and finally in 1932 by William Stanier.

The major source of friction, however, was the Midland's policy of using small engines, adding another if the load warranted it, or for hilly stretches. This had worked perfectly well, for the Midland's track in general was level, but trains were becoming heavier. The other major member of the grouping, the London & North Western Railway (LNWR), had already invested in larger engines for its lines north of Manchester. Another passion imported from the Midland was for standardisation, which, in the case of axleboxes was to prove problematic for future heavier locos.

Production carried on much as before, of Midland 0-6-0s and 4-4-0 "Compounds", while Hughes 4-6-0s were built at Horwich and Crewe. However, plans were afoot for something larger, with a Castle class loco borrowed from the Great Western Railway for trials between Euston and Carlisle. In 1927, 50 4-6-0's were produced by the North British Locomotive Company and in 1930, production of a further 20 was begun at Derby.

=== William Stanier ===
William Stanier was appointed in 1932 as someone from outside of the company who was unaffected by the politics of the various constituent companies within the LMS. His appointment would clearly have been accompanied by a change in attitude which included influencing the civil engineers to invest in strengthening the Midland track and structures. Crewe had been provided by the LNWR with a very large foundry and he concentrated most of the production there. The central drawing office remained in Derby, at Nelson Street, and in 1933, under Lord Stamp, Derby became a national research centre with the establishment of the LMS Scientific Research Laboratory in 1933 on the west side of London Road.

The main business of any locomotive works is maintenance and repairs, but Derby continued to build Fowler's 0-6-0s and assisted Crewe with longer production runs, usually with castings provided by Crewe. It also assisted Nelson Street with new ventures, including the LMS's pioneering work with diesel shunters. In 1931, an old Midland Railway Class 1F 0-6-0 tank had been converted by fitting a Davey Paxman diesel engine and a hydraulic transmission by the Derby firm of Haslam & Newton.

Although the hydraulic transmission failed in 1936, valuable experience had been gained, and various shunters were ordered from outside manufacturers. Two of these types, one from Armstrong Whitworth powered by a Sulzer engine, the other from Hawthorn Leslie & Company with an English Electric engine, both with electric transmission, provided the future pattern for shunters which would come to be built at Derby, and later the basis for the British Rail Class 08.

During World War II the works built Class 5 4-6-0s, and 2-6-4Ts. Charles Fairburn oversaw the building of a Hampden bomber repair facility involving both the Loco and the Carriage & Wagon works. Wings and fuselages were repaired and sent to a private contractor at Nottingham for assembly. In time other aircraft were repaired, including Lancasters. The works also built carriages for field guns and anti-tank guns.

=== Fairburn and Ivatt ===
In 1944, Fairburn became Chief Mechanical Engineer when Stanier retired, and he was followed in 1945 by George Ivatt.

Locomotive production continued, including new versions of the shunters. The first, from 1936, had a single motor driving the wheels through a jackshaft. This was because the axle-hung motors of the English Electric design had proved difficult to ventilate and had given severe overheating problems. This had been overcome in 1940 by using double reduction gearing on the axle-hung motors and limiting the maximum speed.

== British Railways ==
When the railways were nationalised in 1947, the works at Derby became part of BR Workshops.

From 1948 the works produced 106 Standard Class 4 2-6-4 tank engines, then from 1951 to 1957 turned to Standard Class 5 4-6-0s, 110 in all. The last steam locomotive to be built, bringing the total to 2,941, was a BR standard class 5 with Caprotti valve gear, number 73154.

In 1948 the first British main-line diesel electric locomotive had been driven out of the paint shop by Ivatt himself, number 10000, just in time to have LMS livery. Its sibling 10001 began its life in British Railways livery. In 1952 the experimental diesel-mechanical locomotive, the Fell diesel, went into service.

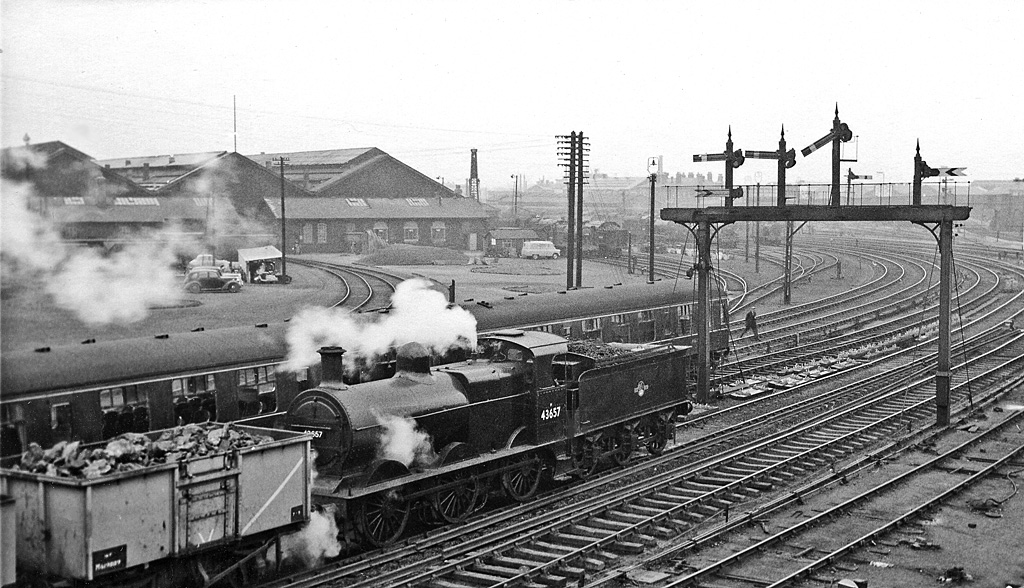
View from the station footbridge in 1960

There matters rested until British Rail's Modernisation Plan and in 1958 production began on the first ten Type 2 main line locos, later known as the Class 24.

In 1959 the first of the Type 4s, later classified Class 44 emerged from the works. The Class 24 were followed by the Class 25, and the Class 44 by the Class 45 and Class 46.

The full complement having been achieved in 1962, new production was concentrated at Crewe, but Derby received one more order when Beyer, Peacock & Company asked to be released from its contract. When production ceased in 1966, over 1,000 diesel locomotives had been built at Derby.

The only new build after that time was six electric non-driving motor coaches in 1977 for the Advanced Passenger Train formations.

== Recent history ==
In 1964 British Railways established the British Rail Research Division, which reported directly to the British Railways Board (BRB). It was the first to move into the new Railway Technical Centre on London Road opposite the old LMS research building, followed by the BRB Department of Mechanical & Electrical Engineering (DM&EE).

In 1969 the workshops were turned into the BR subsidiary British Rail Engineering Limited (BREL) which also had its headquarters in the Railway Technical Centre.

In 1990 the closure of BREL Derby locomotive works was announced. The locomotive works was mostly demolished, part of the plant was used for bogie production by Bombardier Transportation (Bombardier Derby Pride Park); though identified as a primary production site by Bombardier in 2001, in 2004 it was announced that the bogie plant was to close due to overcapacity in the European rail industry.

The works site, along with the land formerly occupied by Chaddesden sidings and the gas works, was renamed Pride Park, part of which is occupied by the Derby County Football Club's Pride Park Stadium.

=== The Roundhouse ===
After determined campaigning by heritage groups, the original North Midland roundhouse, with the original Midland Railway offices and the original Midland Counties workshop, was spared. (The Birmingham and Derby's workshops had been demolished around 1870.) Though Grade II listed, they became more and more derelict. There was talk for a while of Waterman Railways taking them over. However, in 2006 it was bought from the city council for £1 by Derby College, which planned to spend £36 million to restore it for use as a college campus, with grants from the Heritage Lottery Fund and the East Midlands Development Agency. The campus opened to students in September 2009. Tours of the Roundhouse are available throughout the year.

Although the locomotive works is no more, railway work is carried on elsewhere in the city by a number of private companies. The Litchurch Lane Carriage Works builds electric multiple units under its present owner Alstom.
