= British Rail Class D16/1 =

Class of diesel electric locomotives

LMS 10000 & 10001 (British Rail class D16/1)
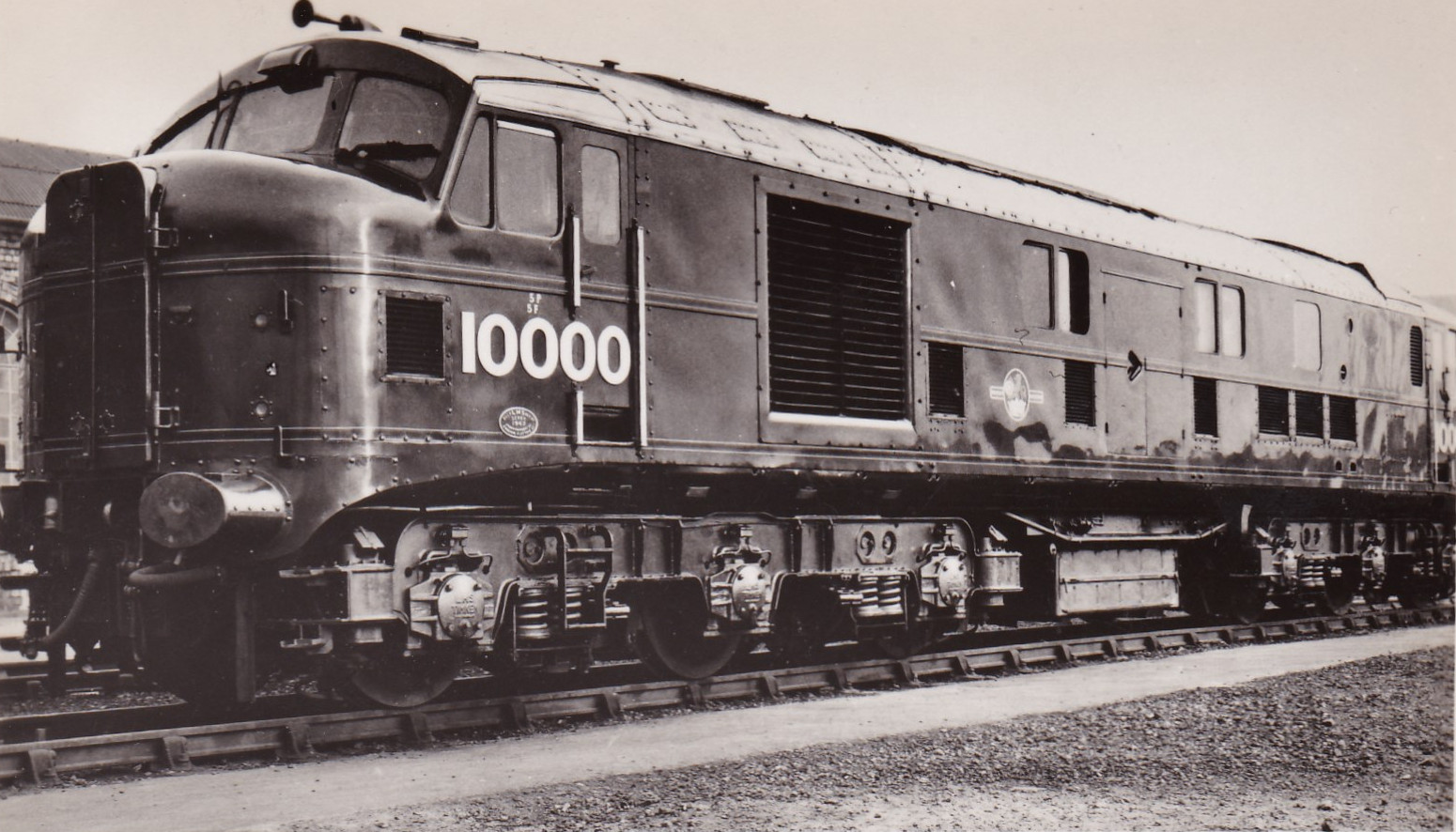
- No.10000 at Chinley
Type and origin
- Power type: Diesel-electric
- Builder: LMS Derby Works
- Order number: LMS Lot number 198
- Build date: 1947–1948
- Total produced: 2
Specifications
- Configuration
  - UIC: Co′Co′
  - Commonwealth: Co-Co
- Gauge: 4 ft 8 1/2 in (1,435 mm) standard gauge
- Wheel diameter: 3 ft 6 in (1.067 m)
- Wheelbase: 51 ft 2 in (15.60 m)
- Length: 61 ft 2 in (18.64 m)
- Width: 9 ft 3 in (2.82 m)
- Height: 12 ft 11 1/2 in (3.95 m)
- Loco weight: 127 long tons 13 cwt (285,900 lb or 129.7 t) later 130.65 long tons (132.75 t)
- Fuel capacity: 815 imp gal (3,710 L; 979 US gal) main 85 imp gal (390 L; 102 US gal) service
- Prime mover: English Electric 16SVT Mk I
- RPM range: 450 - 750 rpm
- Traction motors: EE 519/3B, 6 off
- Transmission: Diesel electric
- MU working: ◆ Red Diamond
- Train heating: Clarkson Steam generator, later replaced by Spanner 2,000 pounds (910 kg) per hour model
- Train brakes: Vacuum
Performance figures
- Maximum speed: 93 mph (150 km/h)
- Power output: 1,760 hp (1,310 kW) gross, 1,600 hp (1,190 kW) net
- Tractive effort: 41,400 lbf (184,000 N) max
Career
- Operators: London, Midland and Scottish Railway; British Railways
- Class: BR (ER/NER): D16/1, later 16/8; BR Class 34
- Power class: LMS: 5P5F; BR: 5MT, later 6P/5F; later Type 3
- Numbers: 10000–10001
- Withdrawn: 1963, 1966
- Disposition: Both scrapped; replica under construction
- Technical details: Britain's First Main-Line Diesel-Electric Locomotives, (English Electric), except where noted

LMS No. 10000 and 10001 were some of the first mainline diesel locomotives built in Great Britain. They were built in association with English Electric by the London, Midland and Scottish Railway at its Derby Works, using an English Electric 1,600 hp diesel engine, generator and electrics.

Under British Railways, the locomotives became British Railways Class D16/1; they were initially operated primarily on mainline express passenger services on former LMS lines, both in single and in multiple. In 1953, they were transferred to the Southern Region for comparison with Bulleid's British Rail Class D16/2 diesel locomotives.

Both locomotives were withdrawn and scrapped in the 1960s.

== Background and design ==
=== Background ===
In March 1947, the LMS announced its intention to operate main line passenger services using diesel traction: initial specifications were for a pair of 1,600 hp locomotives with a top speed of 100 mph (160 km/h), capable of hauling express services such as the Royal Scot. The company also announced it intended to use the same type singly on semi-fast suburban and medium weight freight services such as were hauled by 2-6-4T engines; English Electric engines were specified of similar design to that used on the company's diesel electric shunting locomotives. (Note: Additionally the company announced its intention to begin experiments with an 800 hp power diesel locomotive engine replacing 2-6-2 locomotives using Thomson-Houston and Davey-Paxman equipment.) The LMS signed an agreement with English Electric to construct two 1600 hp locomotives: the mechanical parts were to be constructed at the LMS's Derby Works with George Ivatt responsible as the overall designer; electrical parts and diesel engine were to be supplied by English Electric.

The bogies took an American pattern design, which was modified by Edward Fox and his team at Derby to create a smooth riding suspension. The welded bogie frame was derived from Fox's earlier design for Liverpool-Southport electric trains.

=== Design ===
The primary suspension consisted of equalising beams with coil springs; the equalising beams were located within the bogie 'sandwich type' side frame, whilst the secondary suspension utilised a two bolsters per bogie incorporating four transverse leaf springs. The locomotive weight was carried on four sliding elements on the bolster, with a centre pivot used to transfer tractive forces.

The locomotive body was a cowl unit design, consisting of structural longitudinal members, with cross stretchers forming the supports for the internal equipment including the engine-generator. The locomotive superstructure was mechanically separated from the load-bearing structures by pivots at either end of the body and incorporated roof doors for access to the diesel engine. The driving cabs incorporating nose sections were also separate structures; each cab was accessible from the other via an inner walkway, and passage between locomotives was enabled by end corridor connections. Each cab 'nose' contained a traction motor cooling fan, and a vacuum exhauster.

The external design was a streamlined, art-deco style twin cab design in a black and chromatic silver livery. English Electric supplied the engine from its Rugby factory, the DC Generator from its Bradford works, and Traction Motors from Dick, Kerr & Co. in Preston. (Note: The engine generator sets and other equipment were taken from an in-production series originally intended for the Egyptian State Railways.) Vacuum brakes were from Westinghouse, and the oil-fired train-heat boiler was from Clarkson.

The engine, and main and auxiliary generators formed a single unit which was mounted on anti-vibration mounts. For use in the locomotive the engine was rated at 1,600 hp at 750 rpm; the engine was water-cooled. Water, lubricating oil and fuel pumps were driven from one end of the engine's crankshaft. Two Serck radiators were used for cooling, each with water and oil cooling elements.

The main generator was a 1,080 kilowatt, 650 volt, and 1,660 amp continuous rated self-ventilated machine directly connected to the engine's crankshaft and supported by an extension of the diesel engine's bedplate. The generator used two separately excited field windings whilst generating, using a series winding for battery-powered (60 cell, 236 Ahr, D.P. Kathanode) motor starting. An auxiliary generator end connected to the main generator rated at 50 kW, 135 V 375 A supplied control equipment, compressors, motor cooling blowers, lighting, as well as providing the excitation for the main generator. Both generators projected from the engine room into a separate dust-filtered control equipment cubicle.

Each axle was powered: the traction motors were axle-hung, nose-suspended, driving the wheelsets via a single reduction gear. The motors were connected in three parallel connected groups of sets of two motors connected in series; each motor was a series-wound machine rated at 220 hp, 300 V, 550 A.

Locomotive power control could be varied through 8 notches, obtained via three engine speeds used (450, 620, 750 rpm) with additional control obtained by varying the main generator excitation.

== Service ==
=== Introduction ===
LMS 10000 was officially presented to the press at Derby Works in December 1947, and the locomotive was also presented at Euston station on 18 December 1947, making a demonstration return journey to Watford.

10000 was outshopped only three weeks before nationalisation, and when 10001 appeared in July 1948, it had British Railways livery. Ivatt 'filed' all correspondence from British Railways instructing the removal of the LMS letters, which were finally removed only upon his retirement, in 1951.

On 14 and 15 January 1948, No. 10000 underwent tests on the line between St Pancras and Manchester, the schedule being set to timings based on a standard 4-6-0 (5X) passenger express locomotive. The attached load was a 393-ton tare, 12 carriage train including a dynamometer car; No. 10000 performed the services within the accepted schedule.

=== Operations ===
After initial tests, from February 1948, locomotive No. 10000 was placed on a twice-daily London-Derby 128.5-mile (206.8 km) return passenger service, hauling trains of 300 to 450 gross tons. No. 10001 also began service on the London-Derby route when completed, with a Derby-Manchester service also begun.

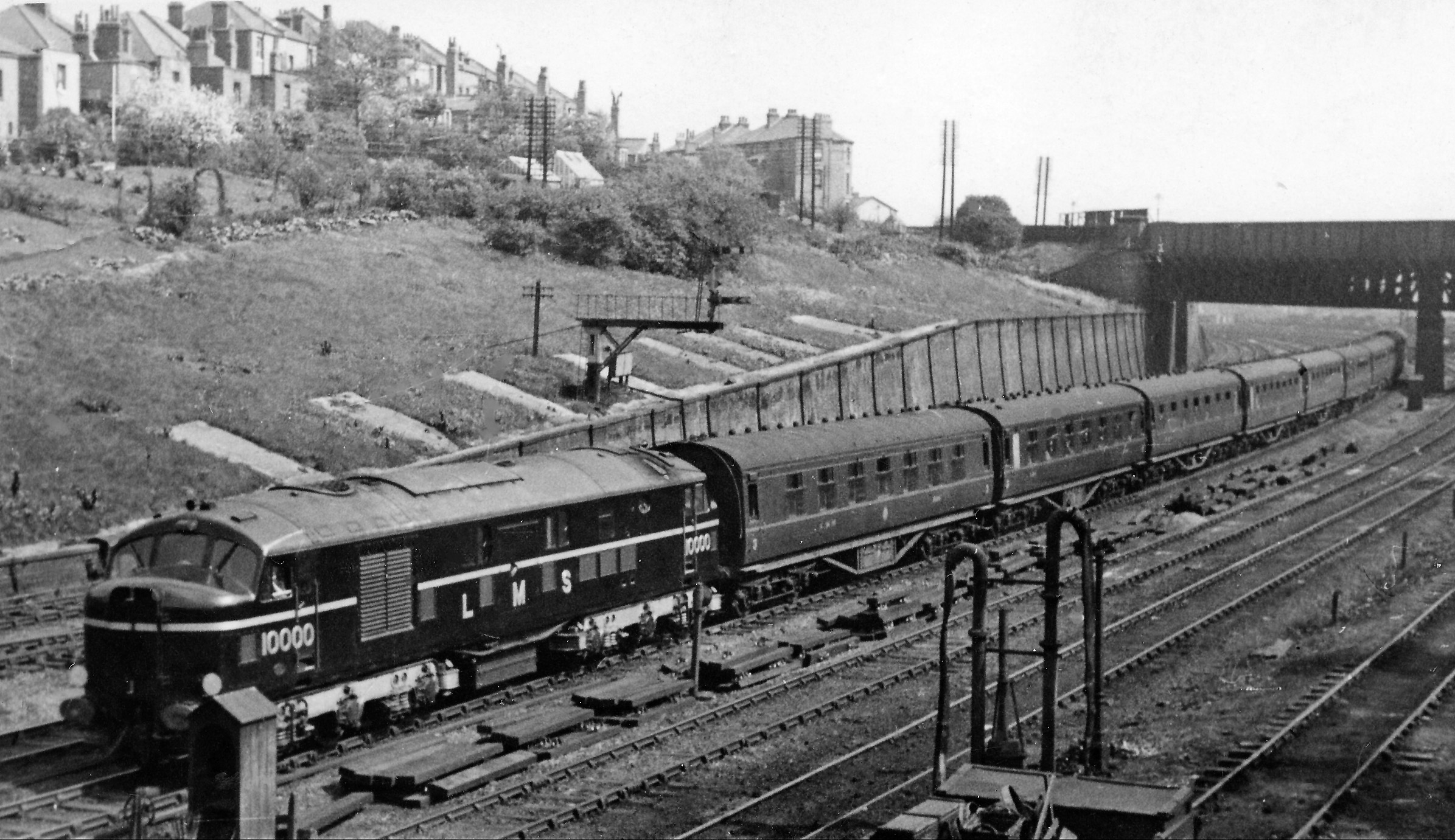
LMS 10000 in LMS livery at Cricklewood in 1948

In late 1948, both units were withdrawn for modifications based on service experience. They then returned to their midland service, before being transferred to operate express Euston-Carlisle-Glasgow passenger trains. The locomotives were operated in multiple: on 1 June 1949, they operated the 16 carriage "Royal Scot" express of 545 gross tons non-stop from Euston to Glasgow, (Note: In The Engineer (10 June 1949) a train weight of 520 tons is quoted for the first London-Glasgow part of the journey, with a peak of 73.5 mph (118.3 km/h) and 65 mph (105 km/h) recorded for 20 miles (32 km). A minimum speed of 33 mph (53 km/h) was reported at the 1 in 75 inclines at Shap.) making a return run on 2 June. At the gradients leading to Shap and Beattock, the engines operated at full power, hauling the trains at 38 and 36 mph (61 and 58 km/h) in each case. After June 1949, the units operated for over two months in multiple formation - working London-Carlisle and later London-Glasgow services.

In multiple, the locomotives showed potential for high speed services, on one occasion operating a standard Euston-Carlisle train at an average speed of just over 60 mph (97 km/h), including delays; this was 74 minutes quicker than usually scheduled.

From mid 1949, the locomotives began operating singly, with No. 10000 worked Euston-Blackpool services, and No.10001 was trialled operating London-Glasgow services. Other services operated included London to Crewe and to Liverpool. On the "Red Rose" express, No. 10001 recorded 82 mph (132 km/h) on a down gradient with a gross train load of 490 tons.

The units were also used on freight services, including express London (Camden) to Crewe, and Crewe-Willesden; the locomotives met the scheduled average speed of 45 mph (72 km/h) on the Camden-Crewe trains with a 500-ton train. One notable freight working was the haulage of a 60 wagon, 1,100 ton gross coal train, between Rugby and Willesden, achieving 25 mph (40 km/h) on a 1 in 133 gradient to Tring Summit.

Other operations included a trial on the Settle & Carlisle line, and workings to Perth, and on one occasion to Aberdeen. Due to boiler problems sometimes leaving them unable to provide carriage heating, they often worked freights in winter and the Royal Scot in summer.

In March 1953, they were both transferred to the Southern Region to allow direct comparison to be made between them and the SR's 10201, 10202, and 10203 and remained there until spring 1955, notably working the Bournemouth Belle and occasionally through to Weymouth and Exeter, but also visiting Brighton Works. At a low point of their career in terms of reliability, they (and the SR locomotives) were sent to Derby where they were overhauled and received green livery and then ran side by side on London Midland Region duties, including the Royal Scot again in 1957–58.

=== Classification ===
At a meeting between the LMS and English Electric on 20 May 1946, it was agreed that a single locomotive would be equivalent to a Class 5 mixed traffic engine, and that two coupled together would be capable of handling the same loads as a Class 7 locomotive.

The original power classification was 5P/5F. Upon transfer to the Southern Region (SR) in 1953, they were given the classification 6P/5F, but No. 10000 was later marked 6P/5FA. At this time, SR practice was to show the loading classification on locomotives, whereas other regions applied the statistical classification. They reverted to 5P/5F at some point after their return to the London Midland Region in 1955; only No. 10000 was marked 5P/5F; No. 10001 was marked 5P/5FA. Their final power classification, allotted in 1957, was simply 5.

In 1957, the two locomotives were placed in the Type 3 power group. The classification system introduced in February 1960 for internal use by the Eastern and North Eastern Regions gave these locomotives the code D16/1; in 1962, this was amended to 16/8. Some sources place them in BR TOPS Class 34, but this is not confirmed by any official BR sources and the TOPS scheme was not introduced until several years after both examples had been scrapped. Other sources show Class 34 to have been initially allocated to the push-pull fitted members of what eventually became Class 33.

=== Withdrawal ===
The last allocation of both locos was at Willesden. The locomotives were laid up at Derby in 1963 with Bulleid's diesels; No. 10001 was made functional using parts of both, and continued operating until 1966, fitted with a yellow warning panel. No. 10000 was withdrawn in 1963 and scrapped at Cashmores, Great Bridge, in January 1968; between withdrawal and scrapping, 10000 spent some time in storage at Derby, and was one of the locos on display at the Derby Works Open Day and Flower Show in August 1964.

No. 10001's later workings were said to be mainly on North London freights to Greenwich, but was also photographed on Wolverhampton expresses and WCML freights during this period. Together, the two units clocked more than 2,000,000 miles (3,200,000 km). 10001 was withdrawn in 1966 and scrapped at Cox & Danks, North Acton, in February 1968.

== Legacy ==
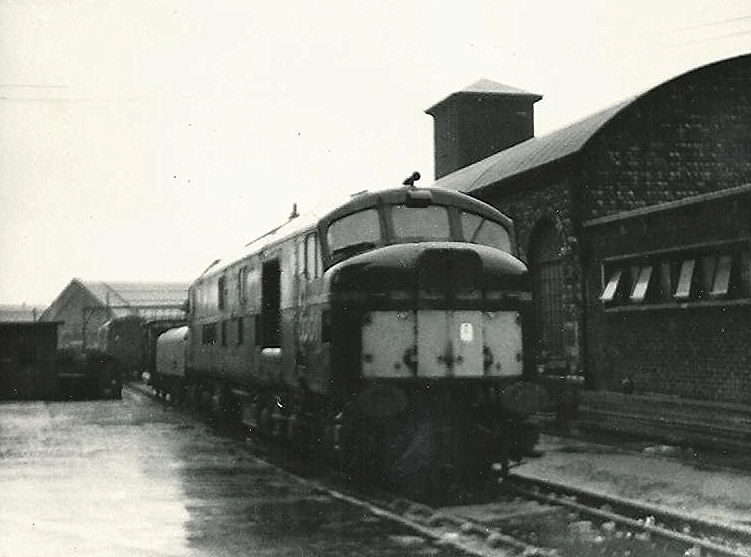
No.10001 at Willesden shed in 1965

The bogie design was used practically unchanged on the EM2 electric locomotives (Class 77). The bogie design incorporating equalising beam suspension influenced a large number of subsequent British diesel locomotives' designs.

Both locomotives were subject to preservation attempts from railwaymen who appreciated the change and improvements gained by the switch to diesels. 10000 was offered to Clapham Railway Museum, but was refused on grounds of space and not representing a class. No. 10001 was hidden at the back of Willesden Depot, having been 'overlooked' for removal at least twice.

== Modern replica ==
In 2011, the Ivatt Diesel Re-creation Society announced plans to build a replica of no. 10000, using contemporary parts as well as new-build components.

The society has a Mark 1 English Electric 16SVT diesel engine dating to the 1940s and the sole remaining Metropolitan Vickers bogies dating from the 1950s, formerly used by a class EM2 electric locomotive in England and the Netherlands. These bogies are of the same design as on the original 10000 although with weaker springs, which will be replaced. The society has purchased Class 58 diesel 58022 which will be used as the new locomotive's chassis. An engineering summary was made public in 2019 followed lengthy discussions with engineers within the railway industry and after ascertaining the most available and practical group of components to include within the locomotive.
