= British Rail Class 44 =

Class of (1Co)(Co1) 2300hp diesel-electric locomotives

Derby Type 4 British Rail Class 44
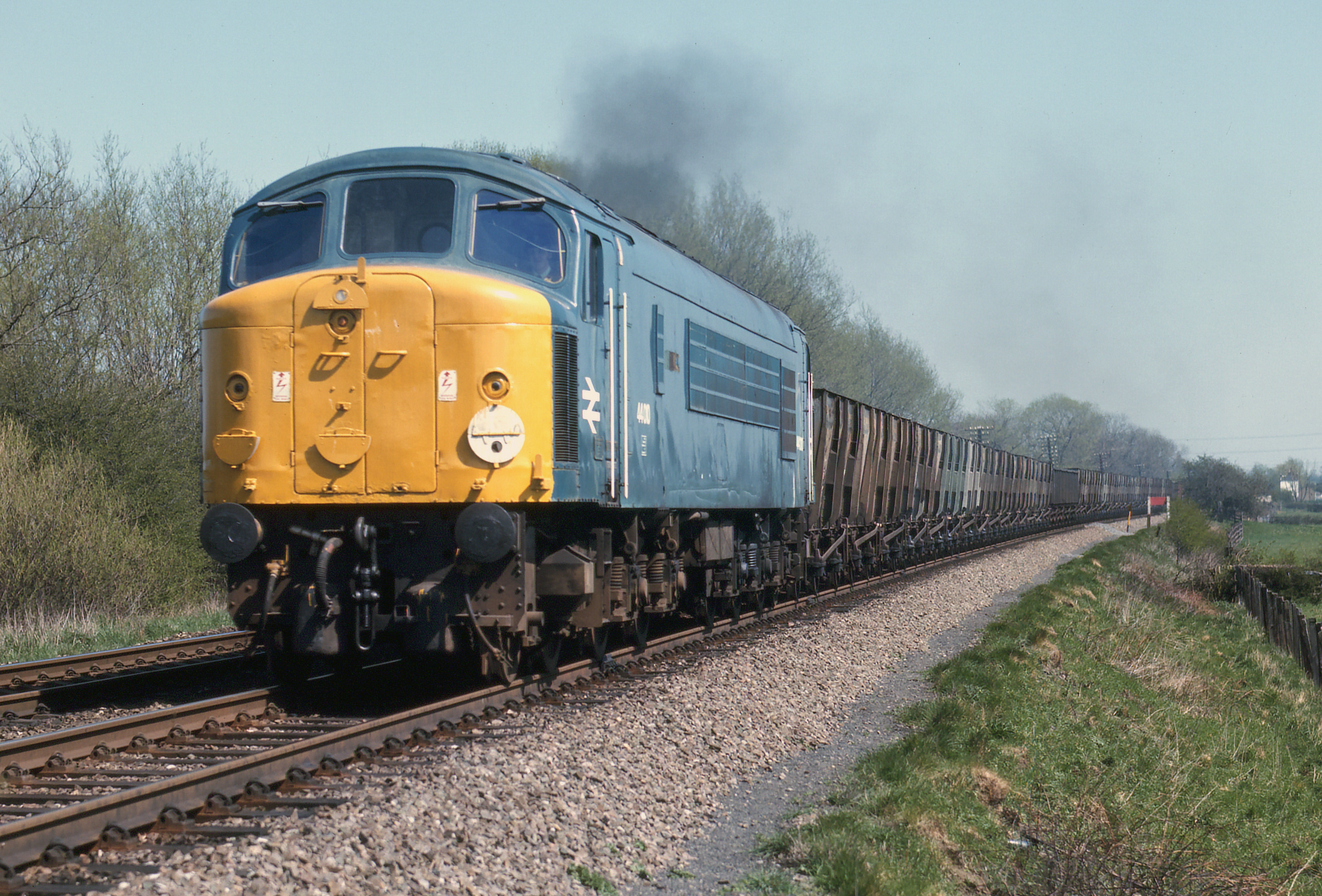
- 44 010 "Tryfan" on the Birmingham-Peterborough line, 1976.
Type and origin
- Power type: Diesel-electric
- Builder: British Railways’ Derby Works
- Build date: 1959–1960
- Total produced: 10
Specifications
- Configuration
  - UIC: (1′Co)(Co1′)
  - Commonwealth: 1Co-Co1
- Gauge: 4 ft 8 1/2 in (1,435 mm) standard gauge
- Wheel diameter: 3 ft 9 in (1.143 m)
- Minimum curve: 5 chains (100 m)
- Wheelbase: 59 ft 8 in (18.19 m)
- Length: 67 ft 11 in (20.70 m)
- Width: 8 ft 10 1/2 in (2.71 m)
- Height: 12 ft 10 in (3.91 m)
- Loco weight: 133 long tons (135 t; 149 short tons)
- Fuel capacity: 840 imp gal (3,800 L; 1,010 US gal)
- Prime mover: Sulzer 12LDA28-A
- Engine type: Diesel
- Generator: Crompton Parkinson GC426-A1
- Traction motors: Six Crompton Parkinson C171-B1
- Transmission: Diesel-electric
- MU working: ★ Blue Star
- Train heating: Steam
- Train brakes: Vacuum
- Safety systems: AWS
Performance figures
- Maximum speed: 90 mph (145 km/h)
- Power output: Engine: 2,300 bhp (1,715 kW); At rail: 1,800 hp (1,342 kW)
- Tractive effort: Maximum: 50,000 lbf (222 kN)
- Brakeforce: 63 long tons-force (628 kN)
Career
- Operators: British Railways
- Numbers: D1–D10; later 44 001–44 010
- Nicknames: Peak
- Axle load class: Route availability 7
- Withdrawn: 1976–1980
- Disposition: Two preserved, remainder scrapped

The British Rail Class 44 or Sulzer Type 4 diesel locomotives were built by British Railways' Derby Works between 1959 and 1960, intended for express passenger services. They were originally numbered D1-D10 and named after mountains in England and Wales, and, along with the similar Class 45 and 46 locomotives, they became known as Peaks.

== Overview ==
In part inspired by LMS prototypes 10000 and 10001, and by Southern Railway 10201-10203, the Class 44 diesels were some of the first big diesels commissioned for the British Rail modernisation project and were the precursors to the Class 45 and Class 46 locomotives of similar design. They were originally designed to have a Co-Co wheel arrangement, but it proved impossible to keep below the 20 long tons (20,000 kg) axle loading limit imposed by the British Railways Civil Engineer. A 1-Co bogie design originally used on the Southern Railway 10201 was used instead.

Construction began in the summer of 1958, although the first example was not completed until April 1959. The ten locomotives were originally allocated to Camden motive power depot and used on the West Coast Main Line, although also often seen on the Midland Main Line. However, with the advent of large numbers of Class 45 locomotives the 10 Class 44 locomotives were transferred to Toton.

== Powertrain ==
A 2,300 bhp Sulzer 12LDA28-A diesel engine drove a Crompton Parkinson GC426-A1 main generator which supplied power to six Crompton Parkinson C171-B1 traction motors. When initially put into service, the locomotives were fitted with multiple working.

They were geared for 90 mph running, although D2 was experimentally geared to run faster than this and was also fitted temporarily with the first intercooled 2,500 bhp B model of the engine. In 1962 it managed 110 mph with three-coach test trains on the West Coast Main Line. This was not intended as a high-speed trial of the Peaks, but to study the condition of the line, before electrification and sustained high-speed running over it.

By 1960, the next batch of Peaks, D11 and the class 45s, were in production. These had lowered motor gearing from 62/17 to 57/22 which reduced the tractive effort, but also reduced traction motor rpm at speed and so reduced the risk of flashover. In 1961, the same gearing change was applied to the class 44s, reducing their continuous tractive effort from 41,000 to 29,000 lbf.

== Teething troubles ==
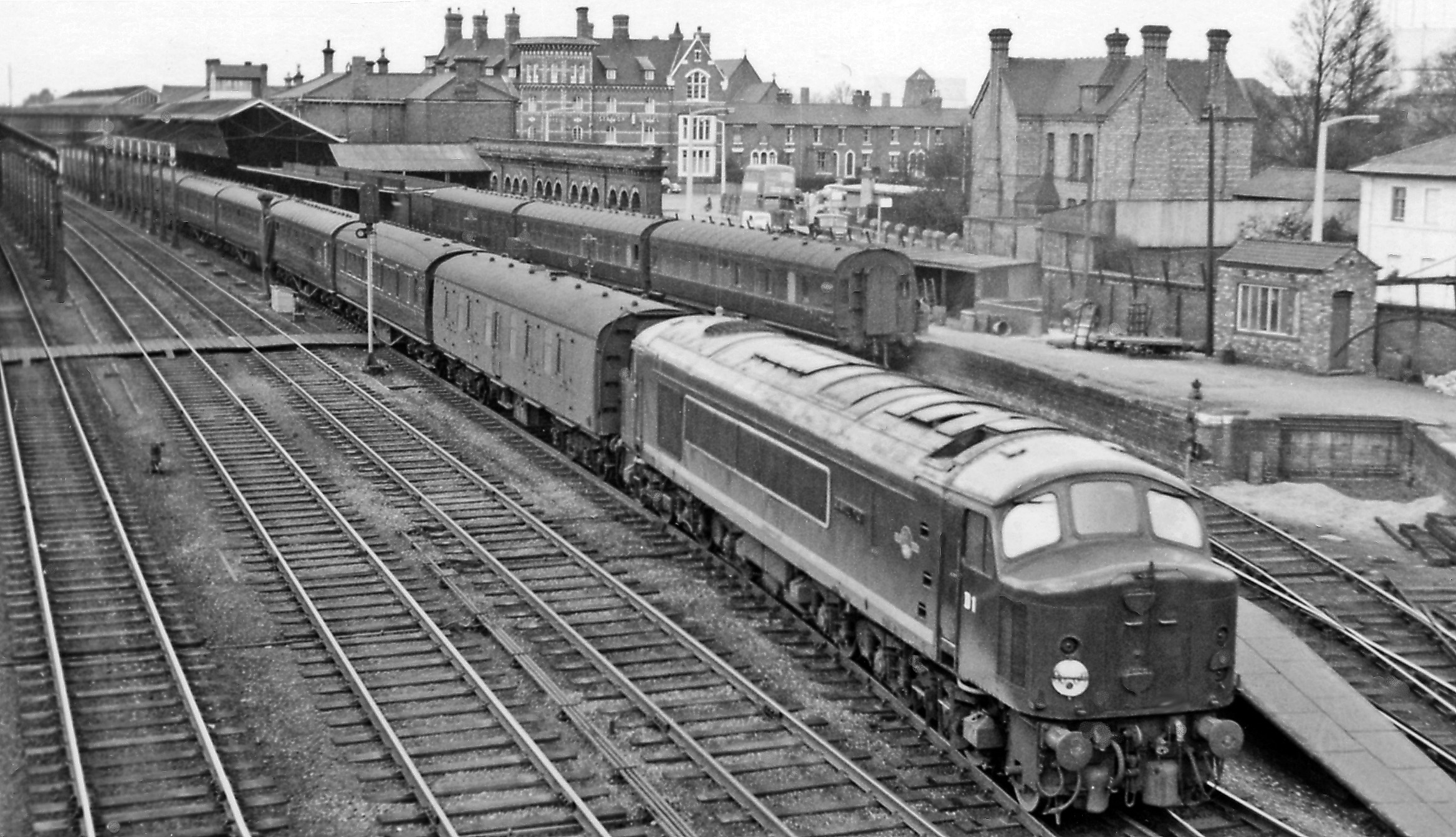
D1 Scafell Pike at Stafford on the WCML working a passenger train, 1960

The class suffered 'a considerable amount of early "teething trouble"' during the early 1960s. The bogies suffered from frame fractures. The vacuum exhausters gave trouble, as did the auxiliary motor, the original batteries supplied were also inadequate and soon became exhausted. The main problem with the exhausters was that they were mounted in the centre of the engine room and so had to be lifted through the roof by crane, taking 8–12 hours to change. The truss girder used for the body sides meant that there was no access through the sides of the bodywork. Considerable trouble was experienced with the water tanks for the steam heating boilers due to fractures.

Once the class 45 units were available, the locomotives were re-assigned to Toton and freight duties, and the steam heating boilers were removed.

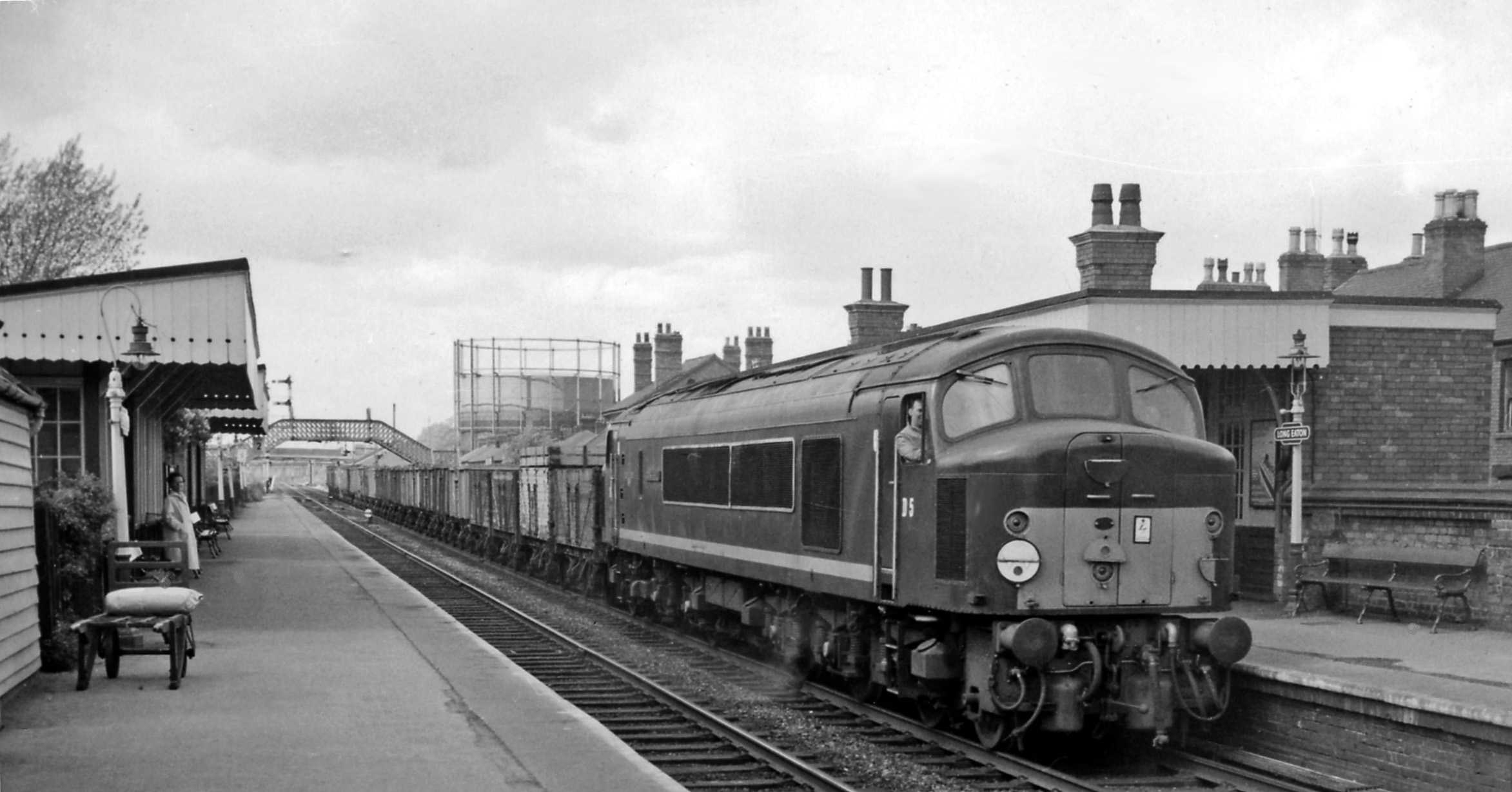
D5 Cross Fell at Long Eaton with a train of 16 tonne mineral wagons, 1962

== Operations ==
The class worked regularly over the West Coast Main Line for a couple of years prior to its electrification, and also between London St Pancras and Manchester Central. Once they were consigned to Freight services, they mostly operated in the East Midlands, all being allocated to Toton until withdrawal.

== Renumbering, withdrawal and preservation ==
The class was renumbered 44 001-010 with the adoption of the Total Operations Processing System in the early 1970s. Withdrawal of the whole class took place between 1976 and 1980.

On 1st October, 1977, the DAA Railtour Society/Diesel and Electric Group organized 'The Peaks Express,' a charter train from St. Pancras to Manchester Piccadilly and back, using three different Peaks locomotives. 44007 ran from London to Toton, 44008 ran to Manchester and back to Toton, and 44009 ran the final leg from Toton to St. Pancras.

Table of withdrawals
Year	Quantity in service at start of year	Quantity withdrawn	Locomotive numbers	Notes
1976	10	2	44001/03	
1977	8	2	44006/10	
1978	6	1	44005	
1979	5	2	44002/09	
1980	3	3	44004/07–08	44004 and 44008 are preserved.

Two locomotives have survived to preservation.

Number(s) (Current in bold)		Name	Livery	Location	Image	Notes
**D4**	44 004	Great Gable	BR Blue	Midland Railway - Butterley		Owning group Peak Locomotive Company
**D8**	44 008	Penyghent	BR Green	Peak Rail		Privately owned

== Fleet details ==
Numbers		Name	Withdrawn	Disposal details	Image
Pre-TOPS	TOPS	Name	Withdrawn	Disposal details	Image
D1	44 001	Scafell Pike	October 1976	Scrapped at Derby Works (February 1977)	
D2	44 002	Helvellyn	February 1979	Scrapped at Derby Works (October 1979)	
D3	44 003	Skiddaw	July 1976	Scrapped at Derby Works (August 1976)	
D4	44 004	Great Gable	November 1980	Preserved at Midland Railway – Butterley	
D5	44 005	Cross Fell	April 1978	Scrapped at Derby Works (November 1978)	
D6	44 006	Whernside	January 1977	Scrapped at Derby Works (February 1978)	
D7	44 007	Ingleborough	November 1980	Scrapped at Derby Works (November 1981)	
D8	44 008	Penyghent	November 1980	Preserved at Peak Rail, Matlock, Derbyshire	
D9	44 009	Snowdon	March 1979	Scrapped at Derby Works (July 1980)	
D10	44 010	Tryfan	May 1977	Scrapped at Derby Works (July 1978)	

== Models ==
In 2009, Bachmann presented their first OO gauge examples of the model This is due to be joined by an example under the Heljan label, once it has been brought up to a standard as set by Accurascale.
