= British Rail Class D16/2 =

Class of 3 1600/2000-hp 1Co-Co1 diesel-electric locomotives

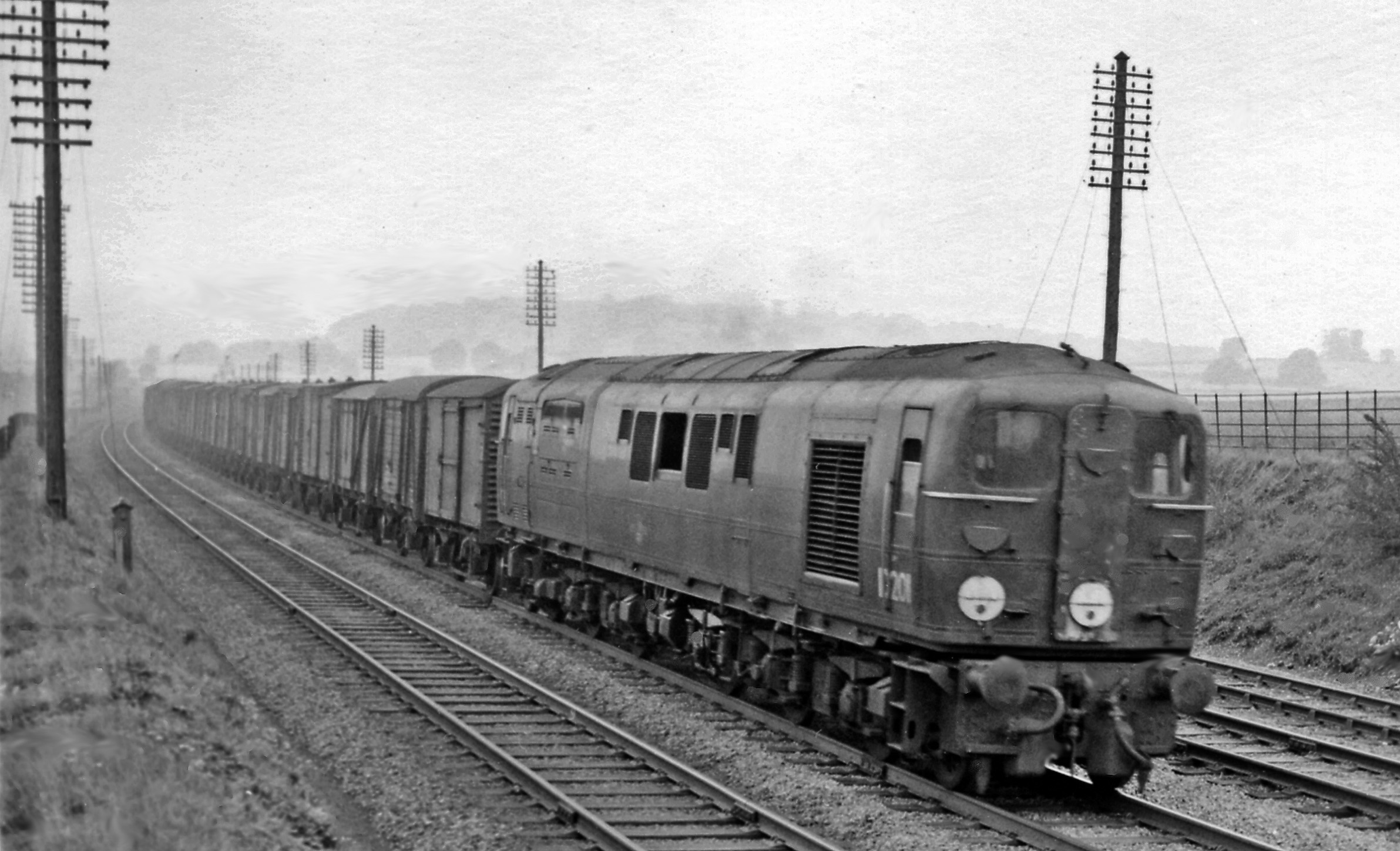
- 10201 at Tring, 1959
Type and origin
- Power type: Diesel-electric
- Builder: BR Ashford Works (2); Brighton railway works (1)
- Order number: SR Order 3441
- Build date: 1950 (10201/10202); 1954 (10203)
Specifications
- Configuration
  - UIC: (1′Co)(Co1′)
  - Commonwealth: 1Co-Co1
- Gauge: 4 ft 8 1/2 in (1,435 mm) standard gauge
- Wheel diameter: Driving: 3 ft 7 in (1.092 m); Idling: 3 ft 1 in (0.940 m)
- Minimum curve: 4.5 chains (297.00 ft; 90.53 m)
- Wheelbase: 55 ft 6 in (16.92 m)
- Length: 63 ft 9 in (19.43 m)
- Width: 9 ft 3 in (2.82 m)
- Height: 13 ft 1 in (3.99 m)
- Loco weight: 133 long tons (135 t; 149 short tons)
- Fuel capacity: 1,150 imp gal (5,200 L; 1,380 US gal)
- Lubricant cap.: 16 imp gal (73 L; 19 US gal)
- Coolant cap.: 280 imp gal (1,300 L; 340 US gal)
- Prime mover: English Electric 16SVT
- Traction motors: English Electric 526A, 6 off
- Cylinder size: 10 in × 12 in (254.0 mm × 304.8 mm)
- Train heating: Steam
- Train brakes: Vacuum
Performance figures
- Maximum speed: 90 mph (140 km/h)
- Power output: Engine: 10201/2: 1,750 bhp (1,300 kW); 1,600 bhp (1,200 kW) from 1957; 10203: 2,000 bhp (1,500 kW); At rail: 10201/2 1,300 bhp (970 kW)
- Tractive effort: 10201/2: 48,000 lbf (213.5 kN)
Career
- Operators: British Railways
- Class: 10201/2: D16/2, later 16/9; 10203: D20/3, later 20/9
- Power class: 10201/2: 6P5F, later 5P5F; 10203: 7P6F, later 6P6F
- Numbers: 10201–10203
- Axle load class: RA 6
- Withdrawn: 1963
- Disposition: All scrapped

British Railways Class D16/2 was a class of prototype diesel locomotives built by British Railways at Ashford Works and introduced in 1950–1951, with a third example being introduced in 1954. They had been designed by Oliver Bulleid for the Southern Railway and were authorised in February 1947 but did not appear until after nationalisation. The diesel engine and transmission were supplied by English Electric, but the Bulleid influence was obvious. The box-like body style closely resembled Bulleid's electric locomotives and was quite different from the usual English Electric style, typified by British Rail Class D16/1 which in turn was strongly influenced by contemporary American design.

Unusually for pioneer British diesels, 10201 and 10202 were originally specified (prior to alteration of gear ratios to improve tractive effort when operating as mixed-traffic units) with a top speed of 110 mph (180 km/h) rather than the 90 mph (140 km/h) of 10203, pre-dating the three-figure maximum speeds of the Deltic and Class 50 designs by some years.

Percy Bollen's bogie design and the power train of 10203 were taken almost unmodified for the first ten production British Rail Class 40s but with a more traditional English Electric design of body with prominent noses and louvred side panels.

== Operation ==
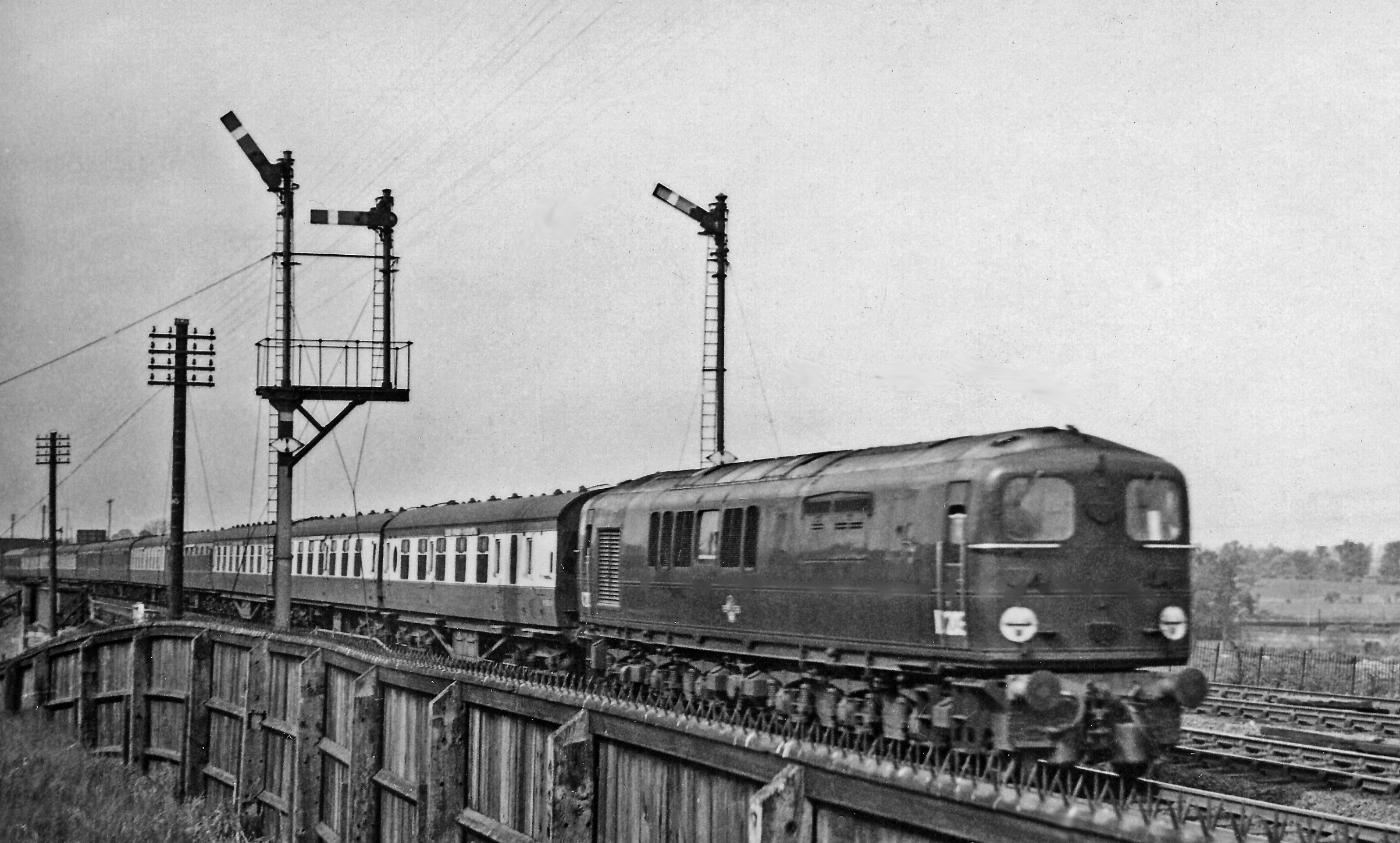
10203 at Wolverton, in 1957

The original locomotives, numbered 10201 and 10202, worked services on the Southern Region of British Railways. They were transferred to Camden depot in the London Midland Region in April 1955.

Number 10203 was outshopped from Brighton railway works in March 1954, its modified engine giving a power output of 2,000 hp (1,500 kW). It was trialled on the Southern Region before joining its sisters on the London Midland, being allocated to Willesden depot.

All three locomotives were non-standard with regard to spare parts and servicing, and they were withdrawn at the end of 1963. After spending some time on the scrap line at Derby Litchurch Lane Works, they were eventually scrapped at Cashmore's at Great Bridge in 1968.

== Additional information ==
- Bogie wheelbase (rigid): 16 ft 0 in (4.88 m)
- Bogie wheelbase (total): 21 ft 6 in (6.55 m)
- Bogie pivot centres: 28 ft 6 in (8.69 m)
- Sanding equipment: Pneumatic
- Heating boiler: Spanner
- Gear ratio: Originally 17:65, amended to 19:61
- Boiler water capacity: 880 imp gal (4,000 L; 1,060 US gal)
- Boiler fuel capacity: From main supply
