= British Rail Class 46 =

Diesel-electric railway locomotive used in Great Britain

Derby Type 4 British Rail Class 46
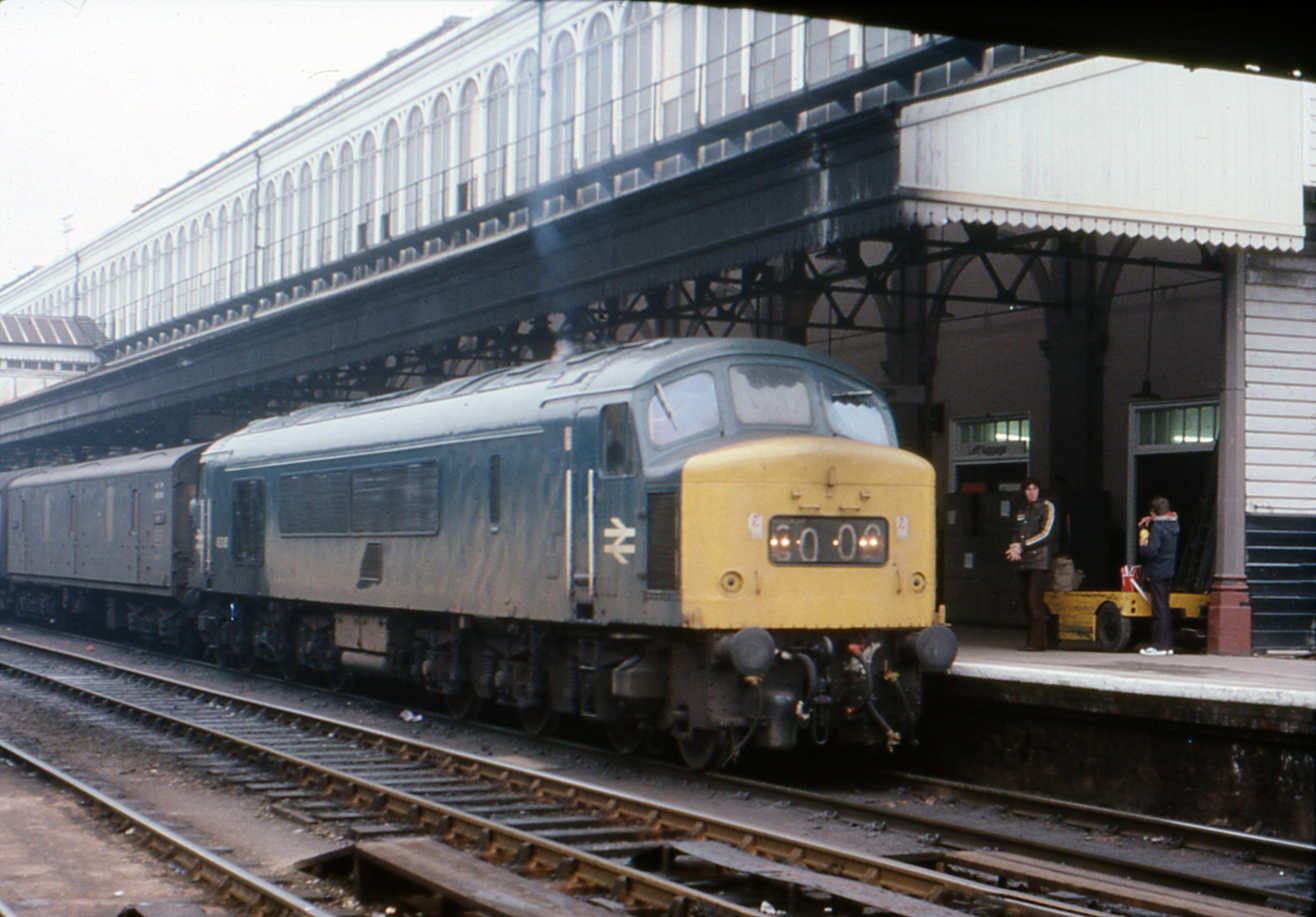
- A Class 46 at Exeter St Davids in 1976.
Type and origin
- Power type: Diesel-electric
- Builder: Derby Works
- Build date: 1961–1963
- Total produced: 56
Specifications
- Configuration
  - UIC: (1′Co)(Co1′)
  - Commonwealth: 1Co-Co1
- Gauge: 4 ft 8 1/2 in (1,435 mm) standard gauge
- Wheel diameter: 3 ft 9 in (1.143 m)
- Minimum curve: 3.5 chains (70 m)
- Wheelbase: 59 ft 8 in (18.19 m)
- Length: 67 ft 11 in (20.70 m)
- Width: 8 ft 10 1/2 in (2.71 m)
- Height: 12 ft 10 in (3.91 m)
- Loco weight: 138 long tons (140 t; 155 short tons)
- Fuel capacity: 790 imp gal (3,600 L; 950 US gal)
- Lubricant cap.: 90 U.S. gal (340 L)
- Coolant cap.: 346 U.S. gal (1,310 L)
- Prime mover: Sulzer 12LDA28-B
- Generator: Brush Main: Brush TG160-90 Aux: Brush TG69-28
- Traction motors: Brush TM73-68
- Cylinders: 12
- Cylinder size: 11 in × 14 in (280 mm × 360 mm) (bore × stroke)
- Transmission: Diesel-electric
- Gear ratio: 62:19
- MU working: ★ Blue Star
- Train heating: Steam Stones OK 4625 or Spanner Mk111
- Train brakes: Vacuum
- Safety systems: AWS
- Couplers: Buffers and chain coupler
Performance figures
- Maximum speed: 90 mph (145 km/h)
- Power output: Engine: 2,500 bhp (1,864 kW); At rail: 1,962 hp (1,463 kW)
- Tractive effort: Maximum: 55,000 lbf (245 kN)
- Brakeforce: 63 long tons-force (628 kN)
Career
- Operators: British Railways
- Numbers: D138–D193; later 46 001–46 056
- Nicknames: ‘Peak’
- Axle load class: Route availability 7
- Withdrawn: 1977–1984
- Disposition: Three preserved, one already destined for scrap wrecked in nuclear flask test, remainder scrapped

The British Rail Class 46 is a class of diesel locomotive. They were built from 1961 to 1963 at British Railways' Derby Works and were initially numbered D138–D193. With the arrival of TOPS they were renumbered to Class 46. Along with the similar Class 44 and 45 locomotives, they became known as Peaks.

Fifty-six locomotives were built. The first was withdrawn in 1977 and all were withdrawn by the end of 1984.

== Overview ==
The Class 46 design was structurally the same as the preceding Class 45 build, and had the same Sulzer engine, but differed in the fitment of a Brush generator and traction motors, in place of the Crompton Parkinson equipment fitted to the Class 45. Along with the other Sulzer class 44 and 45 designs they are often referred to as "Peaks", so named because the Class 44s were named after mountains.

The British Transport Commission decided to cancel the final twenty Class 46 locomotives then on order and invited bids for twenty locomotives of a new Type 4 specification using the Brush electrical equipment intended for the cancelled order. Brush won the contract with what became the Class 47.

In common with the other classes of Peak diesel which had the same design, Class 46 locomotives were prone to cracking of the bogie castings. This was due to the stresses of negotiating sharp curves with a bogie of such length, and also because the buffing gear was mounted on the bogie itself and not on the main frame of the locomotive.

=== Liveries ===
All Class 46s were delivered in BR Green with a broad horizontal grey stripe on the lower bodyside and small yellow warning panels on the ends. From the late 1960s all were repainted into the corporate image Rail Blue, although repaints carried out at BR depots between works visits did vary and at least D138 (later 46 001) was recorded in Rail Blue with full yellow ends, but retaining the grey stripe on the lower body side.

== Naming ==
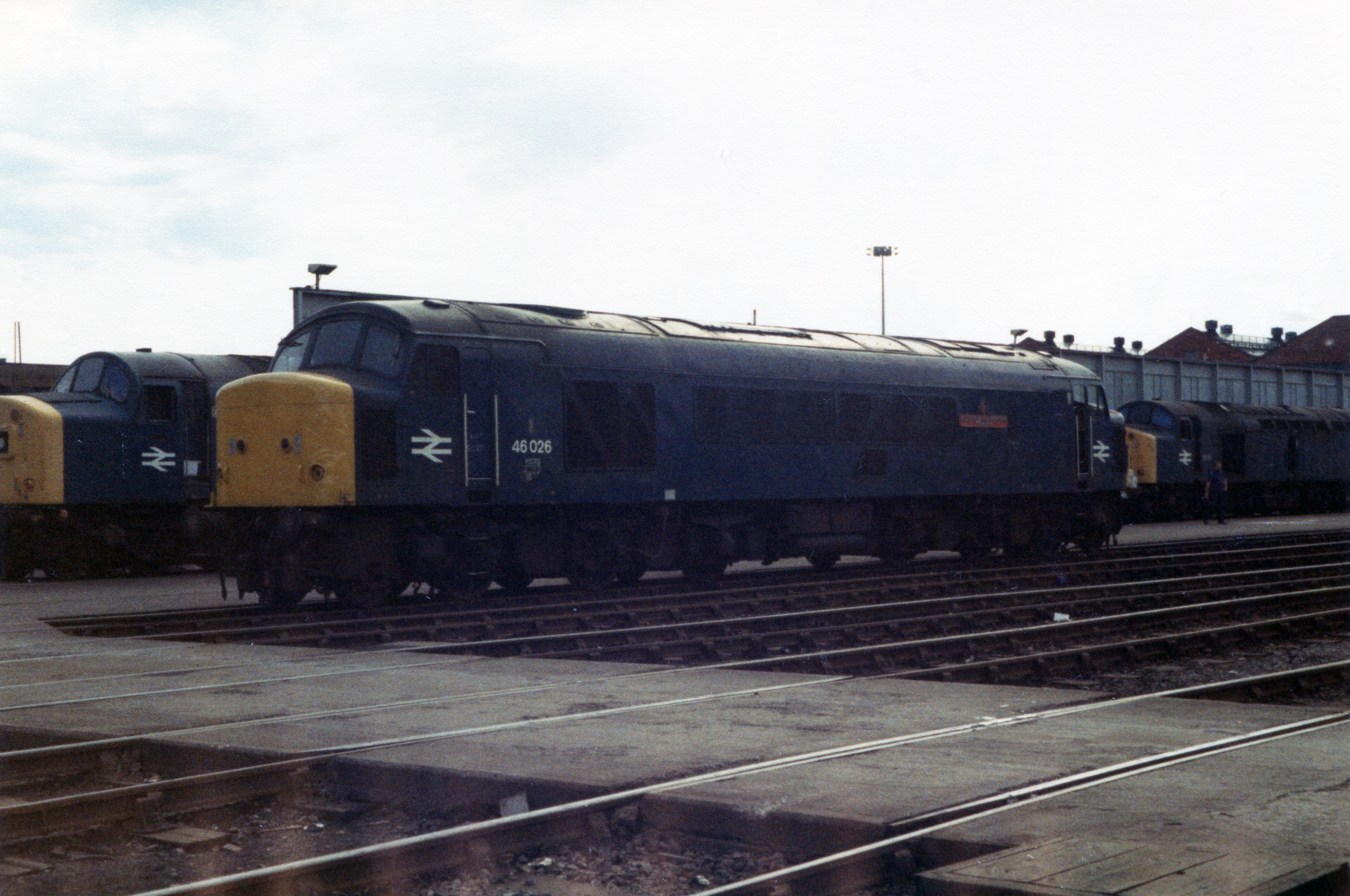
46 026 Leicestershire and Derbyshire Yeomanry - the only named Class 46.

Unlike the earlier Peak classes where many had names, only D163 (later 46 026) carried one (Leicestershire and Derbyshire Yeomanry) from new. This engine was nicknamed "The Lady" by both staff and rail fans alike. This name is now carried by the preserved Class 45 number D123/45 125.

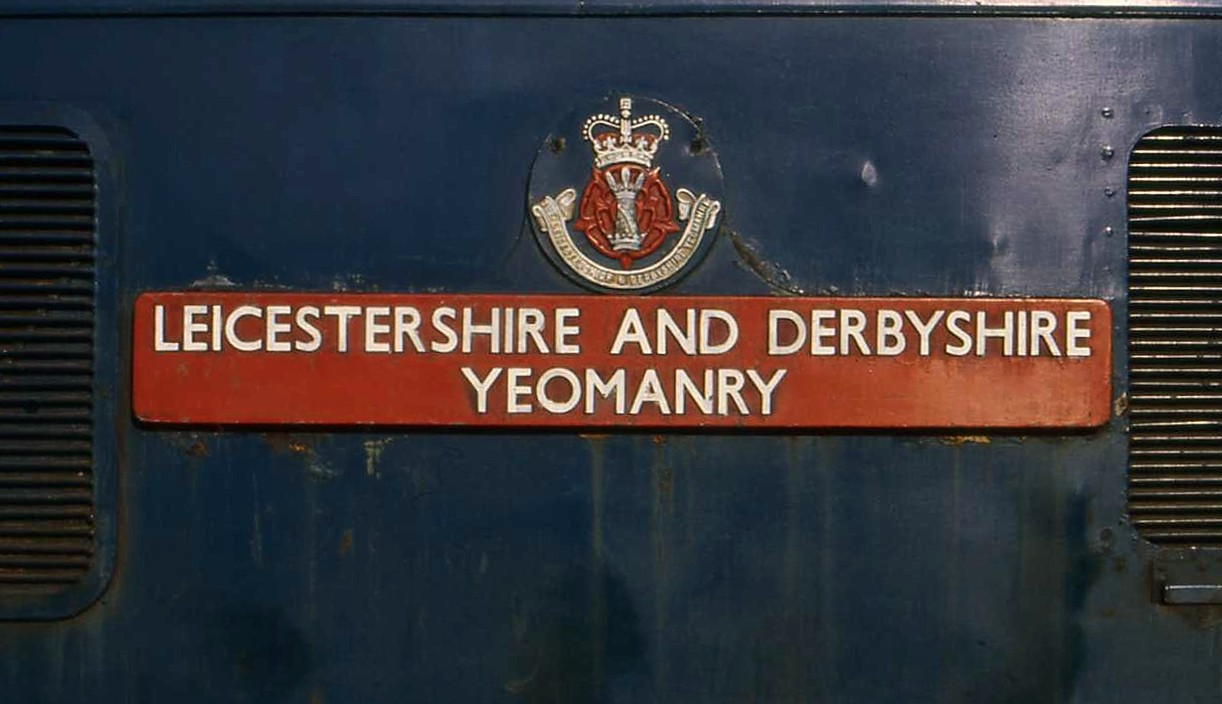
Detail of 46 026's nameplate.

== Operation ==
Distribution of locomotives, March 1974
British Rail Class 46 is located in England
Code	Name	Quantity
BR	Bristol Bath Road	22
GD	Gateshead	24
LA	Laira	10
Total:		56

Whilst seeing intermittent use on freight trains, Class 46s were regular performers on passenger turns, particularly North East-South West, Trans-Pennine and secondary North East-London trains, and depot allocations reflected this with locos at Gateshead and Plymouth in 1977 giving a typical spread. Long-distance freight workings were common, particularly "clay hoods" carrying china clay from Cornwall to the Stoke-on-Trent area.

For a period around 1980, several Class 46 locomotives were placed into storage at Swindon Works. Some were only stored for a few months, but most were reinstated by the end of 1981.

In the 1980s, the remaining locomotives were concentrated at Gateshead depot, and the final booked passenger workings for the class were the dated summer Saturday services Bradford - Weymouth (between Bradford and Birmingham New Street), Newcastle - Plymouth, Newcastle - Blackpool North, and York - Blackpool North. The last five locomotives were officially withdrawn on 25 December 1984.

Beyond revenue service, two Class 46s were transferred to departmental stock in December 1984. 46 035 became 97 403 and was named 'Ixion'. It was used for tests into adhesion and had a large red panel painted on the sides in the then-standard departmental livery. 46 045 was renumbered 97 404 and was retained as a source of spare parts for 97 403 as required.

Disposal of Class 46s was almost exclusively carried out at BR works, with Swindon Works doing much of the work along with Derby Works and Doncaster Works. The two exceptions were 46 027 which was cut up at Vic Berrys scrapyard in Leicester, and 46 009 whose final demise is described below.

== Nuclear flask crash test ==
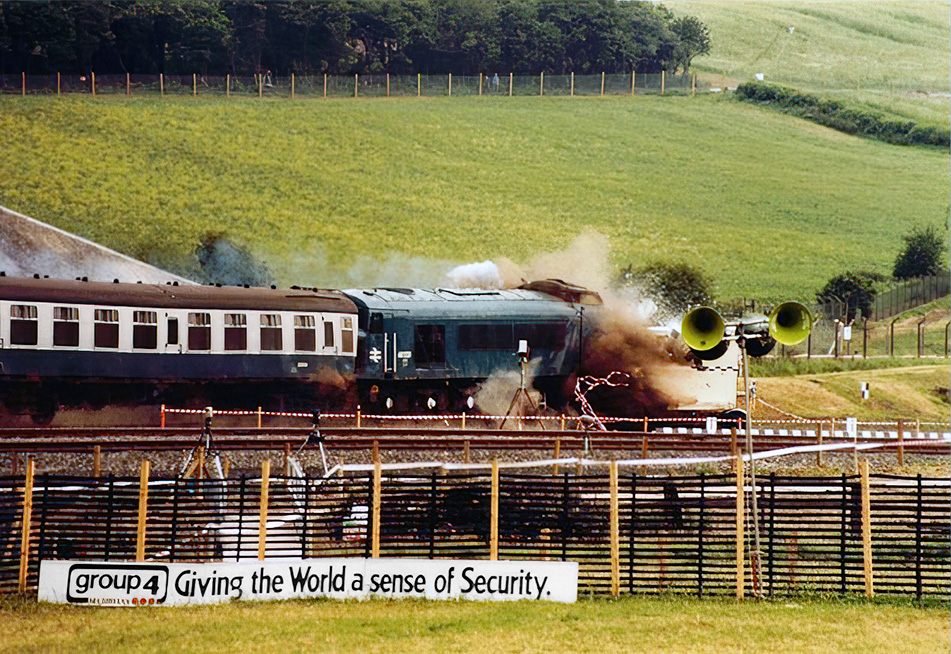
The moment of impact during the nuclear flask test at Old Dalby Test Track, 17 July 1984

On 17 July 1984, 46 009 (formerly D146), hauling three Mark 1 coaches, was deliberately crashed into a "Flatrol" wagon loaded with an empty nuclear waste flask and lying on its side. 46 009 had been adapted so that it could be operated remotely, and also had a camera mounted on the nose to record the impact. At the point when the locomotive hit the flask it was travelling at about 100 mph (160 km/h), and the resulting impact was recorded and later broadcast publicly. The test was carried out on the Old Dalby Test Track and was organised by the CEGB. The test was intended to demonstrate to the public that there would be no leak of radioactive material in the event of a rail accident involving a train carrying a nuclear waste flask.

46 009 was scrapped on site at Old Dalby later the same month by Vic Berry of Leicester. Sister locomotive 46 023 had been the standby locomotive in case 46 009 failed. The flask that was used in this test is on display outside Heysham 1 power station training centre.

== Preservation ==
Three of the class have been preserved: 46 010 (formerly D147) at the Great Central Railway (Nottingham), 46 035 Ixion (formerly D172) at Peak Rail owned by the Waterman Railway Trust, and D182 (46 045) which is owned by the Peak Locomotive Company at the Midland Railway – Butterley

In February 1994, D172 became the first privately owned ex-BR diesel to be certified for main line operation.

== Models ==
A model of the Class 46 has been produced by Bachmann since 1994 in OO gauge.

== Gallery ==
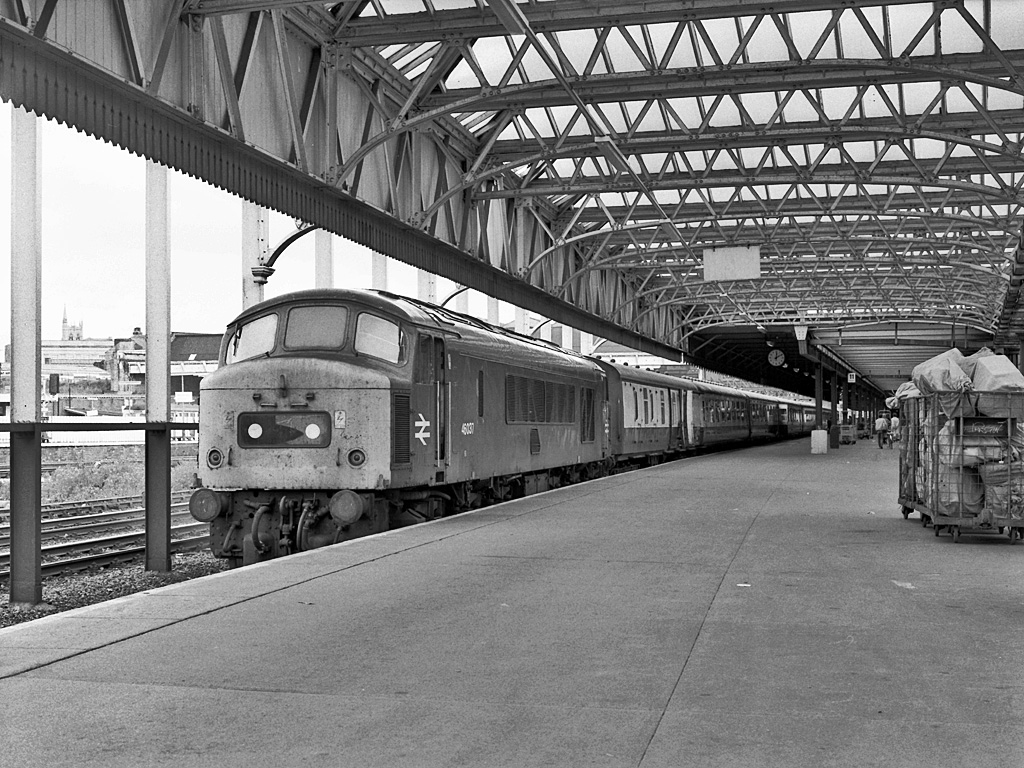
46 037 at Manchester Victoria (1983)

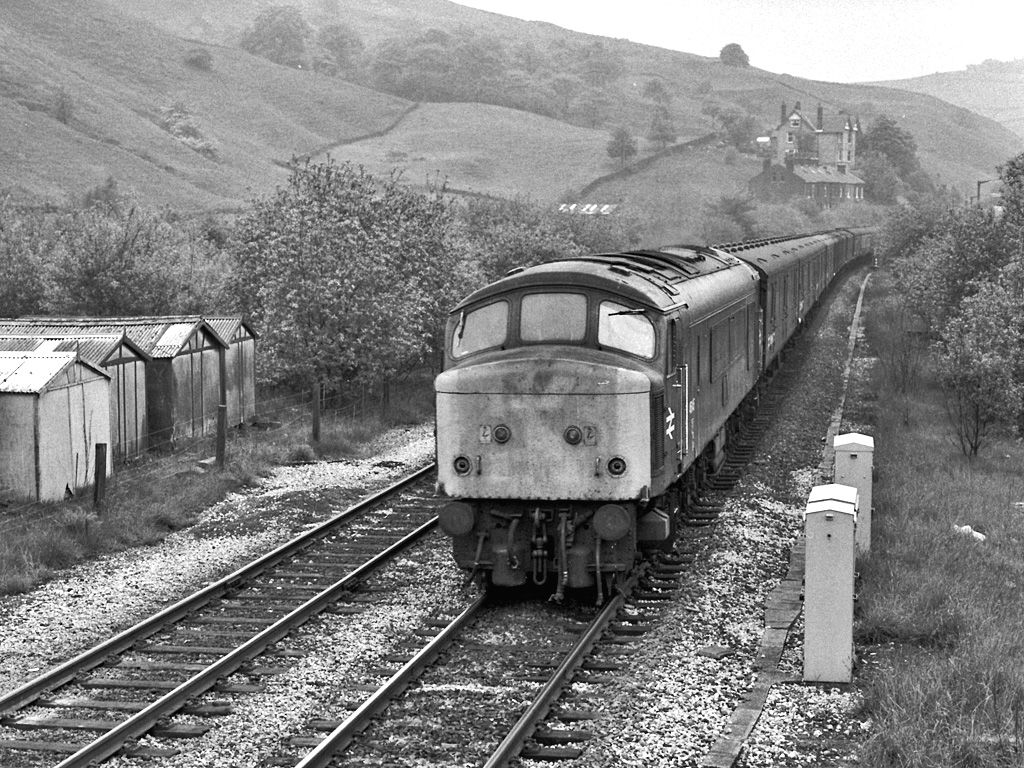
46 045 at Walsden (1983)

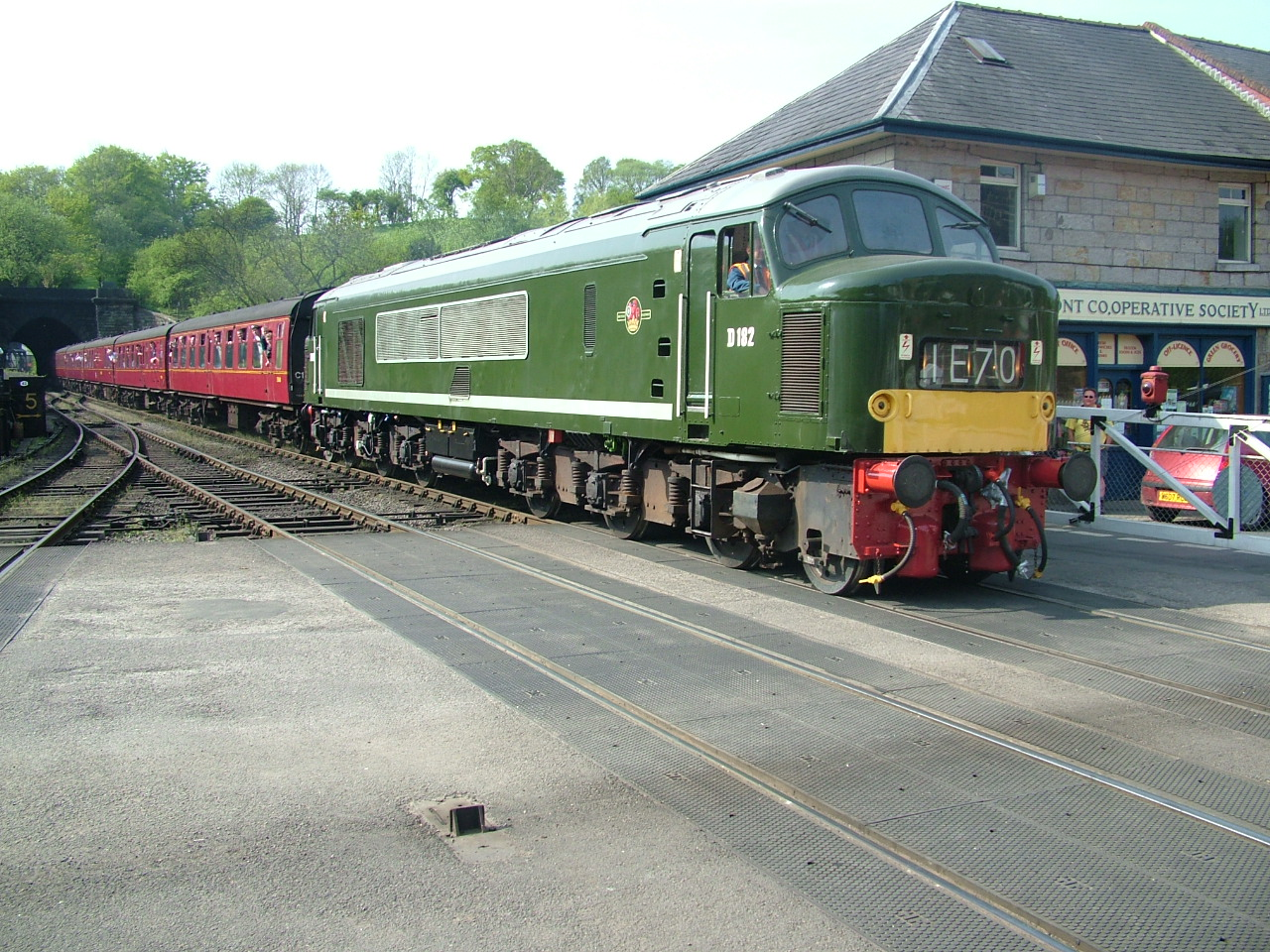
Preserved loco D182 (46 045) at Grosmont (2008)
