= British Rail Class 45 =

British class of diesel-electric locomotives

Derby Type 4 British Rail Class 45
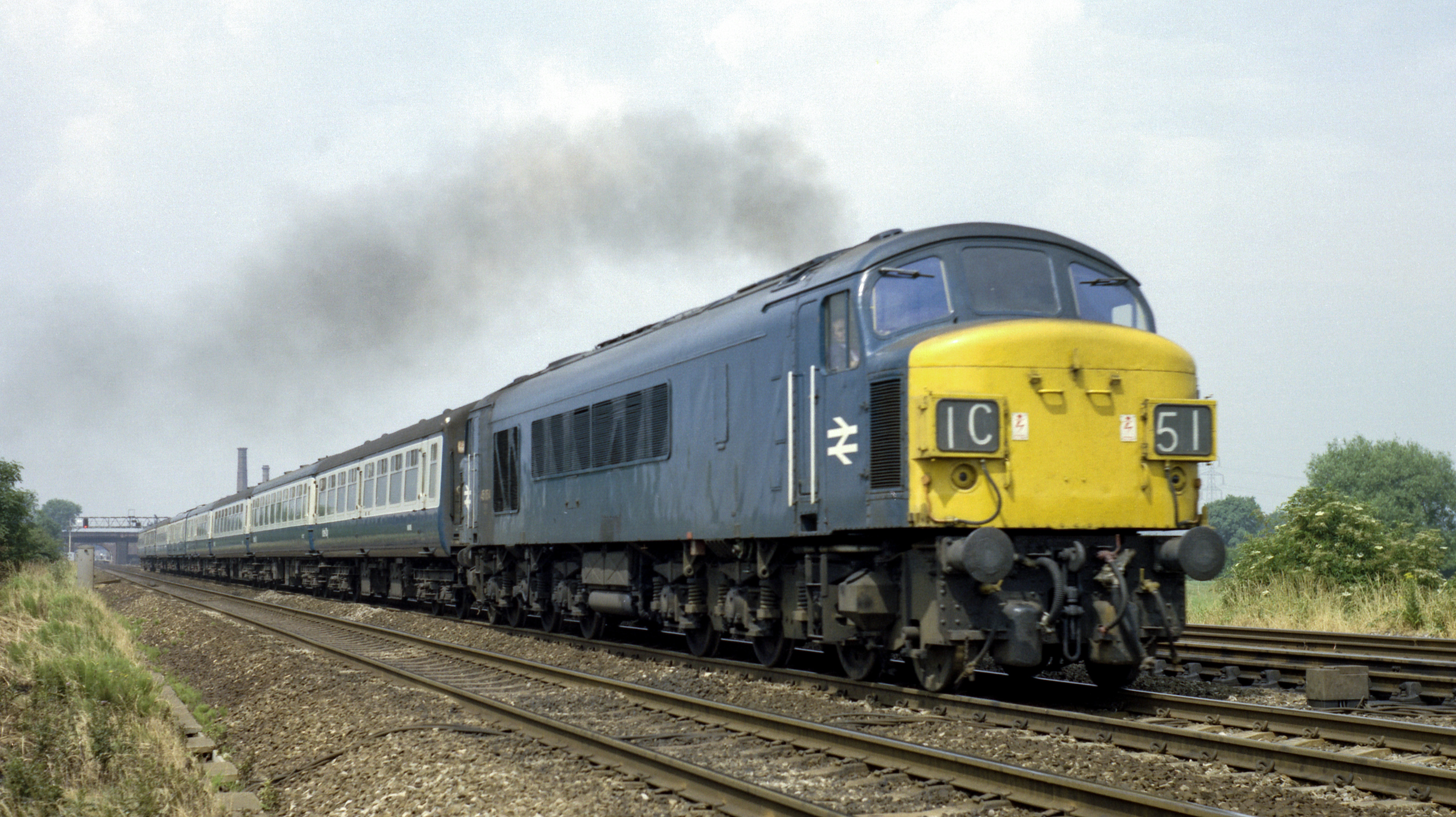
- A Class 45 south of Loughborough, 1975
Type and origin
- Power type: Diesel-electric
- Builder: British Railways' Derby Works and Crewe Works
- Build date: 1960–1962
- Total produced: 127
Specifications
- Configuration
  - UIC: (1′Co)(Co1′)
  - Commonwealth: 1Co-Co1
- Wheel diameter: 3 ft 9 in (1.143 m)
- Minimum curve: 5 chains (100 m)
- Wheelbase: 59 ft 8 in (18.19 m)
- Length: 67 ft 11 in (20.70 m)
- Width: 8 ft 10 1/2 in (2.71 m)
- Height: 12 ft 10 in (3.91 m)
- Loco weight: 133 long tons (135 t; 149 short tons)
- Fuel capacity: 840 imp gal (3,800 L; 1,010 US gal)
- Lubricant cap.: 190 imp gal (860 L)
- Coolant cap.: 346 imp gal (1,570 L)
- Prime mover: Sulzer 12LDA28-B
- Engine type: four stroke 12 cylinder double bank
- Displacement: 12× 22 litres (1,300 cu in) per cylinder, or 264 litres (16,100 cu in) total
- Generator: Crompton Parkinson
- Traction motors: Crompton Parkinson
- Cylinders: 12
- Cylinder size: 280 mm × 360 mm (11.024 in × 14.173 in), bore × stroke
- MU working: ★ Blue Star
- Train heating: 45/0: Steam; 45/1: Electric Train Heat
- Loco brake: Air
- Train brakes: Vacuum and Air
- Safety systems: AWS
Performance figures
- Maximum speed: 90 mph (145 km/h)
- Power output: Engine: 2,500 bhp (1,864 kW); At rail: 2,000 hp (1,491 kW)
- Tractive effort: Maximum: 55,000 lbf (245 kN)
- Brakeforce: 63 long tons-force (628 kN)
Career
- Operators: British Railways
- Numbers: D11–D137; later 45001–45077, 45101–45150
- Nicknames: Peak
- Axle load class: Route availability 7
- Withdrawn: 1981-1989
- Disposition: Eleven preserved, remainder scrapped

The British Rail Class 45 or Sulzer Type 4 are a type of diesel locomotives built by British Railways' Derby and Crewe Works between 1960 and 1962. Along with the similar Class 44 and 46 locomotives, they became known as Peaks.

== Technical details ==
=== Engine ===
The engine of the Class 45 was a marine-type, slow-revving diesel, a Sulzer 12LDA28B with a bore of 280 mm (11.024 in) (hence the 28 in the engine designation) and a stroke of 360 mm (14.173 in). This gave 22 litres (1,300 cu in) per cylinder, or 264 litres (16,100 cu in) for the whole engine. The unit was turbocharged and intercooled and gave 2,500 hp (1,900 kW) at 750 rpm. The engine was of the double bank type with two parallel banks of 6 cylinders, geared together to a single output shaft. Six-cylinder versions of the engine were fitted in the Class 25 locos (amongst others) and eight-cylinder versions in Class 33s. Class 45s were the updated versions of the Class 44 locomotives, the latter having a 2,300 hp (1,700 kW) non-intercooled version of the same engine; i.e. the 12LDA28A. The later Class 47 had a modified version of the same engine, a 12LDA28C.

=== Train heating ===
When initially put into service, the locomotives were fitted with multiple-unit working and steam-heating boilers for passenger service. In the early 1970s, fifty were fitted at Toton TMD with electric train supply in place of their steam-heating boilers and assigned to work services on the Midland Main Line from London St Pancras to Nottingham, Derby and Sheffield. These locomotives were renumbered as Class 45/1.

=== Locomotive auxiliary supply ===
The Class 45 is unusual in having a 220 volt electrical system for driving auxiliary systems and battery charging. Most British Railways diesels of the same era had 110 volt auxiliaries.

== History ==
Distribution of locomotives, March 1974
British Rail Class 45 is located in England
Code	Name	Quantity
CW	Cricklewood	11
HO	Holbeck	39
TO	Toton	77
Total:		127

The Class 45s became the main traction on the Midland Main Line from 1962 and their introduction allowed considerable acceleration of the previous steam-powered service. The Class 45s remained the main source of power on the line up to 1982, when they were relegated to secondary services following introduction of HSTs on the route. From 1986, Class 45s virtually disappeared from the line. From the early 1980s until their withdrawal c. 1988, the class were regular performers on the North Trans-Pennine line working services from Liverpool Lime Street to York, Scarborough or Newcastle via Manchester Victoria, Huddersfield and Leeds. These trains were usually formed of early Mark 2 carriages, of up to seven in a typical train.

== Accidents and incidents ==
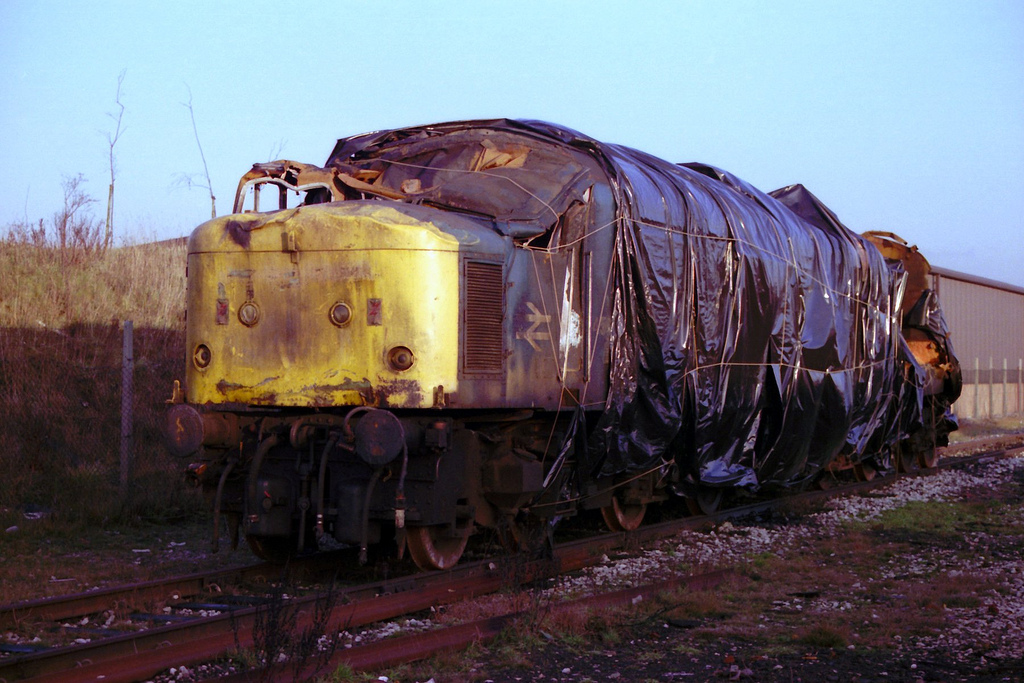
45147 at Patricroft, after the Eccles rail crash

- On 6 December 1963 a freight train hauled by D94 passed at least two stop signals and collided with a goods train which was crossing the line at Stanton Gate railway station under clear signals. The front end of D94 was almost totally destroyed, causing the deaths of the driver and second man.
- On 16 January 1982, 45 074 was hauling a freight train that was derailed at Chinley, Derbyshire.
- On 4 December 1984, 45 147 was badly damaged in the Eccles rail crash, and subsequently moved to Patricroft.
- On 9 March 1986, 45 014 The Cheshire Regiment was one of two light engines that were hit head-on by a passenger train at Chinley due to a signalman's error. One person was killed. Lack of training and a power cut were contributory factors. The locomotive was consequently withdrawn from service and scrapped.
- On 24 April 1988, 45 041 split a set of points and was derailed at Edale, Derbyshire.

== Withdrawal ==
The great majority of Class 45s were withdrawn between 1981 and 1988, after Class 43 HSTs were introduced to their routes; the last was withdrawn from service by 1989.

== Fleet details ==
=== Naming ===
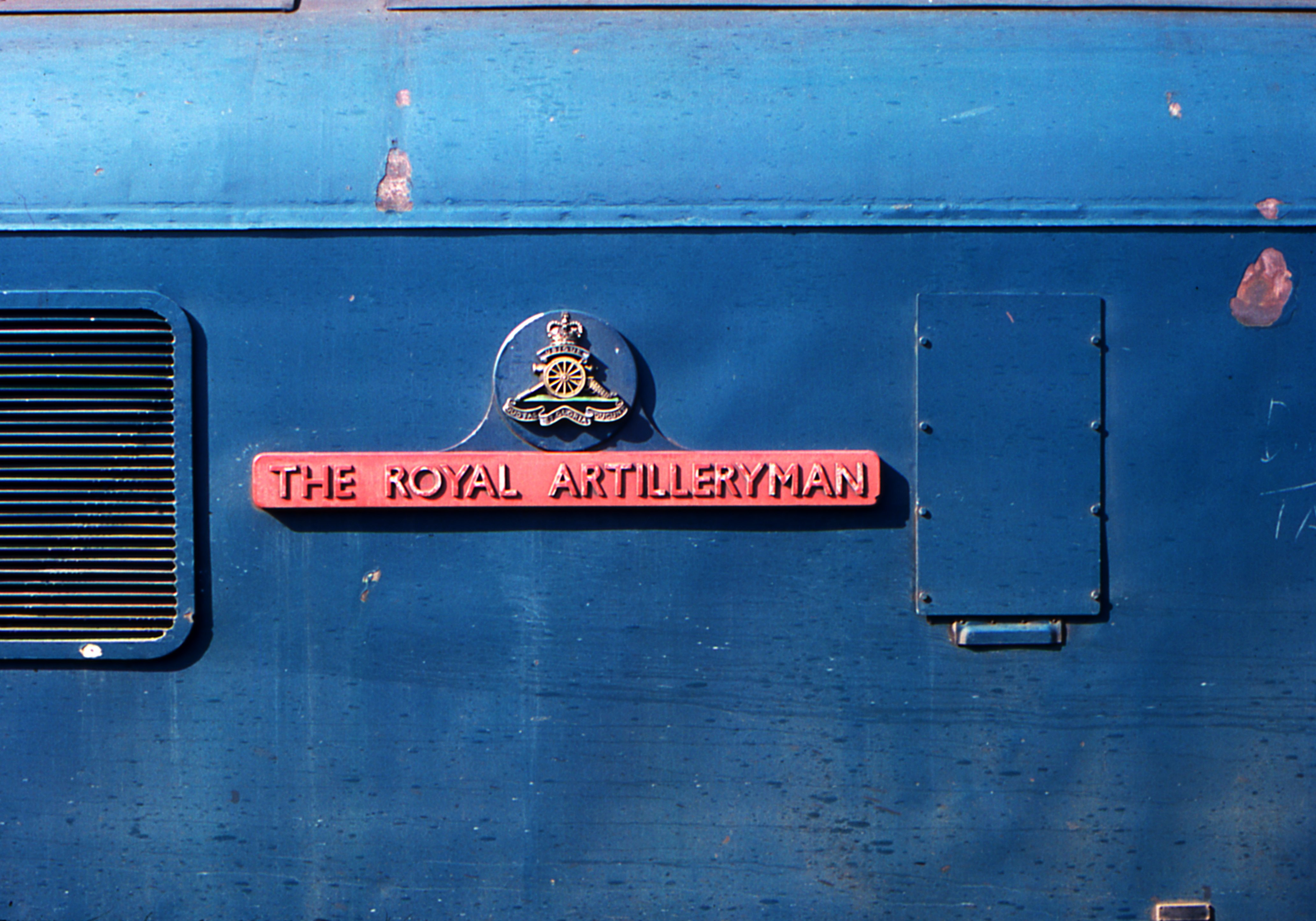
45118's nameplate

26 Class 45s were officially named by BR after various British Army regiments and the Royal Marines. Additionally, several were unofficially named.

=== Fleet list ===
Number(s)		Name	Withdrawn	Disposal details
1957 series	TOPS	Name	Withdrawn	Disposal details
D11	45122		04/1987	Scrapped at MC Metals, Glasgow (02/1994)
D12	45011		05/1981	Scrapped at Derby Works (09/1981)
D13	45001		01/1986	Scrapped at Derby Works (11/1988)
D14	45015		03/1986	Still in derelict condition at the Battlefield Line (as of May 2024)
D15	45018		04/1981	Scrapped at Swindon Works (10/1982)
D16	45016		11/1985	Scrapped at Vic Berry, Leicester (12/1986)
D17	45024		10/1980 due to fire damage	Scrapped at Swindon Works (08/1983)
D18	45121	Pegasus (unofficial name)	19 November 1987	Scrapped by Thomas Hill at Crewe Works (09/1993)
D19	45025		05/1981	Scrapped at Derby Works (11/1981)
D20	45013	Wyvern (unofficial name)	04/1987	Scrapped at MC Metals, Glasgow (02/1994)
D21	45026		04/1986	Scrapped at MC Metals, Glasgow (11/1988)
D22	45132		09:39 on 11 May 1987	Preserved at Epping Ongar Railway
D23	45017		08/1985 Training Loco ADB 968024 Toton September 1985-00.1988	Scrapped at MC Metals, Glasgow (11/1991)
D24	45027		05/1981	Scrapped at Swindon Works (09/1983)
D25	45021		12/1980	Scrapped at Swindon Works (04/1983)
D26	45020		12/1985	Scrapped at Vic Berry, Leicester (08/1988)
D27	45028		01/1981	Scrapped at Swindon Works (04/1983)
D28	45124	Unicorn (unofficial name)	12:34 on 22 January 1988 withdrawn due to bogie fire Leicester 29 December 1987	Scrapped at MC Metals, Glasgow (10/1991)
D29	45002		09/1984	Scrapped at MC Metals, Glasgow (11/1988)
D30	45029		07/1987 reinstated as 97 410 September 1987 withdrawn August 1988	Scrapped at MC Metals, Glasgow (10/1991)
D31	45030		11/1980	Scrapped at Derby Works (03/1981)
D32	45126		27 April 1987	Scrapped at MC Metals, Glasgow (04/1992)
D33	45019		09/1985	Scrapped at Vic Berry, Leicester (01/1987)
D34	45119		7 May 1987	Scrapped at MC Metals, Glasgow (04/1994)
D35	45117		12 May 1986	Scrapped at Vic Berry, Leicester (02/1987)
D36	45031		05/1981	Scrapped at Derby Works (10/1981)
D37	45009		09/1986	Scrapped at Vic Berry, Leicester (08/1988)
D38	45032		12/1980	Scrapped at Swindon Works (09/1983)
D39	45033	Sirius (unofficial name)	02/1988	Scrapped at MC Metals, Glasgow (02/1992)
D40	45133		10 May 1987	Preserved at Midland Railway – Butterley Owned by the Class 45/1 Preservation Society
D41	45147		4 January 1985 due to damage in Salford accident 4 December 1984	Scrapped at Patricroft by Vic Berry, Leicester (03/1985)
D42	45034		07/1987 reinstated September 1987 as 97411 withdrawn July 1988	Scrapped at MC Metals, Glasgow (05/1992)
D43	45107	Phoenix (unofficial name)	15:19 on 27 July 1988	Scrapped at MC Metals, Glasgow (03/1990)
D44	45035		05/1981	Scrapped at Derby Works (11/1981)
D45	45036		05/1986	Scrapped at Vic Berry, Leicester (08/1988)
D46	45037	Eclipse (unofficial name)	07/1988	Scrapped at MC Metals, Glasgow (03/1992)
D47	45116		22 December 1986	Scrapped at Vic Berry, Leicester (09/1988)
D48	45038		06/1985	Scrapped at Vic Berry, Leicester (12/1986)
D49	45039	The Manchester Regiment	12/1980	Scrapped at Swindon Works (04/1983)
D50	45040	The King's Shropshire Light Infantry	07/1987 reinstated as 97412 September 1987; withdrawn August 1988	Scrapped at MC Metals, Glasgow (10/1991)
D51	45102		9 September 1986	Scrapped at Vic Berry, Leicester (10/1988)
D52	45123	The Lancashire Fusilier	22 July 1986	Scrapped at Vic Berry, Leicester (11/1988)
D53	45041	Royal Tank Regiment	8 June 1988	Preserved at Midland Railway – Butterley; Owned by Peak Locomotive Company
D54	45023	The Royal Pioneer Corps	09/1984	Scrapped at Vic Berry, Leicester (10/1986)
D55	45144	Royal Signals	21 December 1987	Scrapped at Vic Berry, Leicester (06/1988)
D56	45137	Bedfordshire and Hertfordshire Regiment (T.A.)	16 June 1987	Scrapped at MC Metals, Glasgow (03/1994)
D57	45042		04/1985	Scrapped at Vic Berry, Leicester (11/1986)
D58	45043	The King's Own Royal Border Regiment	09/1984	Scrapped at Vic Berry, Leicester (01/1987)
D59	45104	The Royal Warwickshire Fusilier	13 April 1988	Scrapped at MC Metals, Glasgow (02/1992)
D60	45022	Lytham St. Annes	07/1987 reinstated September 1987 as 97409; withdrawn July 1988	Scrapped at MC Metals, Glasgow (10/1991)
D61	45112	The Royal Army Ordnance Corps	14:43 on 7 May 1987	Main line operational
D62	45143	5th Royal Inniskilling Dragoon Guards	14:43 on 7 May 1987	Scrapped at MC Metals, Glasgow (03/1994)
D63	45044	Royal Inniskilling Fusilier	06/1987	Scrapped at MC Metals, Glasgow (11/1988)
D64	45045	Coldstream Guardsman	05/1983 due to collision at Saltley 10 February 1983	Scrapped at Vic Berry, Leicester (10/1986)
D65	45111	Grenadier Guardsman	14:43 on 7 May 1987	Scrapped at MC Metals, Glasgow (04/1992)
D66	45146		7 April 1987	Scrapped at MC Metals, Glasgow (03/1992)
D67	45118	The Royal Artilleryman	8 May 1987	Preserved; stored at Loram Derby
D68	45046	Royal Fusilier	08/1988	Scrapped at MC Metals, Glasgow (05/1992)
D69	45047		08/1980	Scrapped at Derby Works (02/1981)
D70	45048	The Royal Marines	06/1985	Scrapped at MC Metals, Glasgow (11/1988)
D71	45049	The Staffordshire Regiment (Prince of Wales's Own)	10/1987	Scrapped at MC Metals, Glasgow (11/1988)
D72	45050		09/1984	Scrapped at Vic Berry, Leicester (03/1987)
D73	45110	Medusa (unofficial name)	15:19 on 27 July 1988	Scrapped at MC Metals, Glasgow (03/1990)
D74	45051		04/1987	Scrapped at MC Metals, Glasgow (11/1988)
D75	45052	Satan and Nimrod (unofficial names)	06/1988	Scrapped at MC Metals, Glasgow (09/1991)
D76	45053		11/1983	Scrapped at Crewe Works by A. Hampton (10/1988)
D77	45004	Royal Irish Fusilier	12/1985	Scrapped at MC Metals, Glasgow (11/1988)
D78	45150	Vampire (unofficial name)	10:40 on 4 February 1988	Scrapped at MC Metals, Glasgow (12/1991)
D79	45005		03/1986	Scrapped at Vic Berry, Leicester (12/1988)
D80	45113	Athene (unofficial name)	2 August 1988	Scrapped at MC Metals, Glasgow (03/1990)
D81	45115		13 June 1988	Scrapped at MC Metals, Glasgow (03/1990)
D82	45141	Zephyr (unofficial name)	4 August 1988	Scrapped at MC Metals, Glasgow (03/1992)
D83	45142		19 June 1987	Scrapped at MC Metals, Glasgow (03/1994)
D84	45055	Royal Corps of Transport	04/1985	Scrapped at Vic Berry, Leicester (11/1986)
D85	45109		27 January 1986	Scrapped at Vic Berry, Leicester (11/1986)
D86	45105		16:25 on 11 May 1987	Preserved at Barrow Hill Roundhouse
D87	45127		14:43 on 7 May 1987	Scrapped at Crewe Works by J&S Metals (03/1994)
D88	45136		14:43 on 7 May 1987	Scrapped at MC Metals, Glasgow (03/1992)
D89	45006	Honourable Artillery Company	09/1986	Scrapped at Vic Berry, Leicester (10/1988)
D90	45008		12/1980	Scrapped at Swindon Works (09/1983)
D91	45056		12/1985	Scrapped at Vic Berry, Leicester (11/1986)
D92	45138		22 December 1986	Scrapped at MC Metals, Glasgow (04/1994)
D93	45057		01/1985	Scrapped at Vic Berry, Leicester (03/1987)
D94	45114		15:35 on 17 February 1987	Scrapped at MC Metals, Glasgow (02/1994)
D95	45054		01/1985	Scrapped at Toton MPD by Vic Berry (11/1985)
D96	45101		13 November 1986	Scrapped at Vic Berry, Leicester (10/1988)
D97	45058		09/1987	Scrapped at MC Metals, Glasgow (03/1994)
D98	45059	Royal Engineer	03/1986	Scrapped at Vic Berry, Leicester (11/1988)
D99	45135	3rd Carabinier	9 March 1987	Preserved at East Lancashire Railway
D100	45060	Sherwood Forester	12/1985	Preserved at Barrow Hill Roundhouse
D101	45061		08/1981	Scrapped at Swindon Works (04/1982)
D102	45140	Mercury (unofficial name)	11:47 on 29 March 1988	Scrapped at MC Metals, Glasgow (09/1991)
D103	45062		07/1987 last run was HRT "Baker's Dozen" Railtour 27 June 1987. Loco failed at MP10 WCML and was rescued by 31305	Scrapped at MC Metals, Glasgow (03/1994)
D104	45063		05/1986	Scrapped at Vic Berry, Leicester (11/1988)
D105	45064		01/1985	Scrapped at Vic Berry, Leicester (11/1988)
D106	45106	Vulcan (unofficial name)	15:19 on 27 July 1988, reinstated 4 August 1988. Finally withdrawn 02/1989 after catching fire on 07:12 Derby to St Pancras, 3 February 1989	Scrapped at CF Booth, Rotherham (04/1992)
D107	45120		24 March 1987	Scrapped at MC Metals, Glasgow (11/1991)
D108	45012	Wyvern II (unofficial name)	07/1988	Scrapped at MC Metals, Glasgow (03/1992)
D109	45139		27 April 1987	Scrapped at MC Metals, Glasgow (03/1994)
D110	45065		03/1985	Scrapped at Vic Berry, Leicester (12/1988)
D111	45129		11 June 1987	Scrapped at Vic Berry, Leicester (12/1988)
D112	45010		03/1985	Scrapped at MC Metals, Glasgow (11/1988)
D113	45128	Centaur (unofficial name)	2 August 1988. reinstated 02/1989, but not used after failed load test; withdrawn 04/1989. Reinstated to haul two railtours which had a Class 45 booked for haulage, after 45106 caught fire and was withdrawn.	Scrapped at MC Metals, Glasgow (03/1992)
D114	45066	Amethyst (unofficial name)	07/1987. Reinstated September 1987 as 97413; finally withdrawn on 26 July 1988	Scrapped at MC Metals, Glasgow (10/1991)
D115	45067		07/1977 after collision at Ilkeston 8 July 1977 11:50 Glasgow-Nottingham	Scrapped at Derby Works (06/1980)
D116	45103	Griffon (unofficial name)	2 August 1988	Scrapped at MC Metals, Glasgow (03/1990)
D117	45130		10 May 1987	Scrapped at MC Metals, Glasgow (03/1992)
D118	45068		01/1986	Scrapped by Vic Berry at Allerton TMD (04/1986)
D119	45007	Taliesin (unofficial name)	07/1988	Scrapped at MC Metals, Glasgow (03/1992)
D120	45108		11:27 on 4 August 1987	Preserved at Midland Railway – Butterley. Owned by Peak Locomotive Company
D121	45069		07/1986	Scrapped at Vic Berry, Leicester (10/1988)
D122	45070		01/1987	Scrapped at MC Metals, Glasgow (11/1988)
D123	45125	Leicestershire & Derbyshire Yeomanry (name only carried in preservation)	14:43 on 7 May 1987. Rescued from MC Metals during the late 1980s and early 1990s	Preserved at Great Central Railway
D124	45131		16:00 on 3 September 1986	Scrapped at Vic Berry, Leicester (11/1988)
D125	45071		07/1981	Scrapped at Swindon Works (07/1983)
D126	45134	Neptune (unofficial name)	12:16 on 17 September 1987	Scrapped at MC Metals, Glasgow (11/1991)
D127	45072		04/1985	Scrapped at Vic Berry, Leicester (11/1986)
D128	45145	Scylla (unofficial name)	9 September 1987. Reinstated 19 October 1987 then finally withdrawn 11:11 on 23 February 1988	Scrapped at MC Metals, Glasgow (12/1991)
D129	45073		10/1981	Scrapped at Derby Works (11/1982)
D130	45148		11:43 on 11 February 1987	Scrapped at MC Metals, Glasgow (04/1992)
D131	45074		09/1985	Scrapped at Vic Berry, Leicester (10/1988)
D132	45075		01/1985	Scrapped at Vic Berry, Leicester (03/1987)
D133	45003		12/1985	Scrapped at Vic Berry, Leicester (04/1987)
D134	45076		11/1986	Scrapped at MC Metals, Glasgow (03/1994)
D135	45149	Phaeton (unofficial name)	16:00 on 14 September 1987	Preserved at Gloucestershire Warwickshire Railway
D136	45077		08/1986	Scrapped at MC Metals, Glasgow (09/1988)
D137	45014	The Cheshire Regiment	03/1986 collision with 31 436 Chinley 9 March 1986	Scrapped by Vic Berry at Ashburys (08/1986)

== Preservation ==
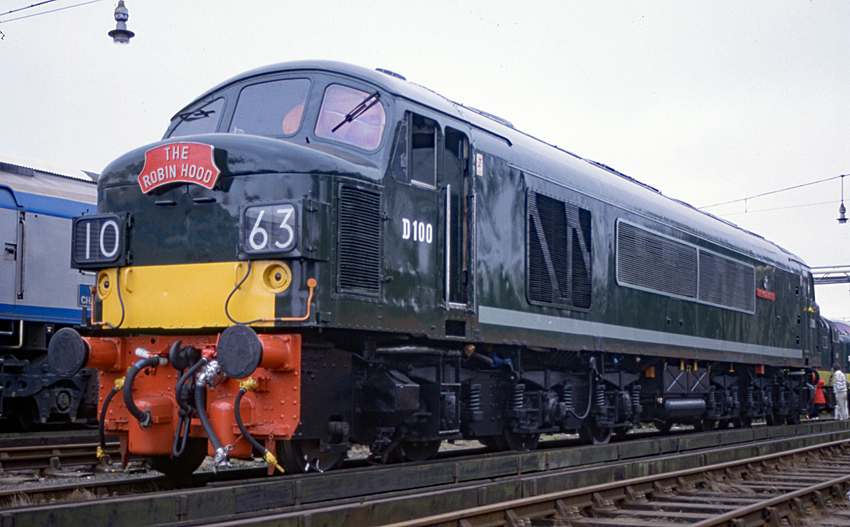
D100 Sherwood Forester at Bournemouth Open Day, 1992

Eleven locomotives survive in preservation, with examples from both batches. The majority of the preserved engines were built at Crewe Works; in summary:

- 45041 – In operational condition at the Nene Valley Railway
- 45060 – Undergoing engine overhaul at Barrow Hill Roundhouse
- 45105 – Undergoing restoration at Barrow Hill Roundhouse
- 45108 – In operational condition on loan at the East Lancashire Railway
- 45112 – Stored at Nemesis Rail, Burton upon Trent
- 45118 – Under overhaul at Crewe Diesel TMD
- 45125 – In operational condition at the Great Central Railway
- 45132 – Under overhaul at the Epping Ongar Railway
- 45133 – Under overhaul at the Midland Railway – Butterley
- 45135 – Under heavy repair at the East Lancashire Railway
- 45149 – In operational condition at the Gloucestershire Warwickshire Railway

== Model railways ==
Mainline Railways introduced OO gauge Class 45s in 1983; D49 The Manchester Regiment and D100 Sherwood Forester in BR green and 45048 The Royal Marines in BR blue.
