= 170s =

Decade

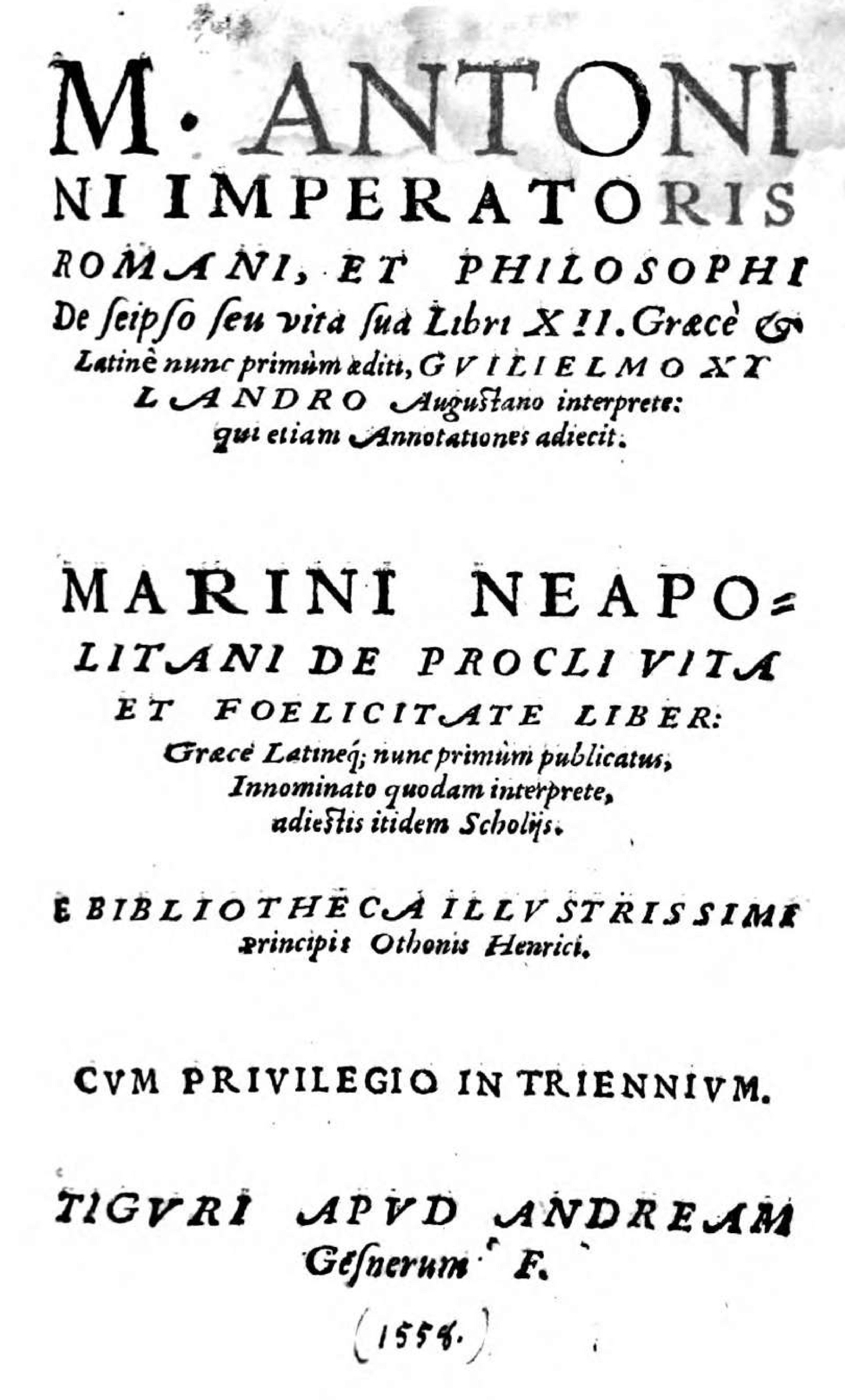
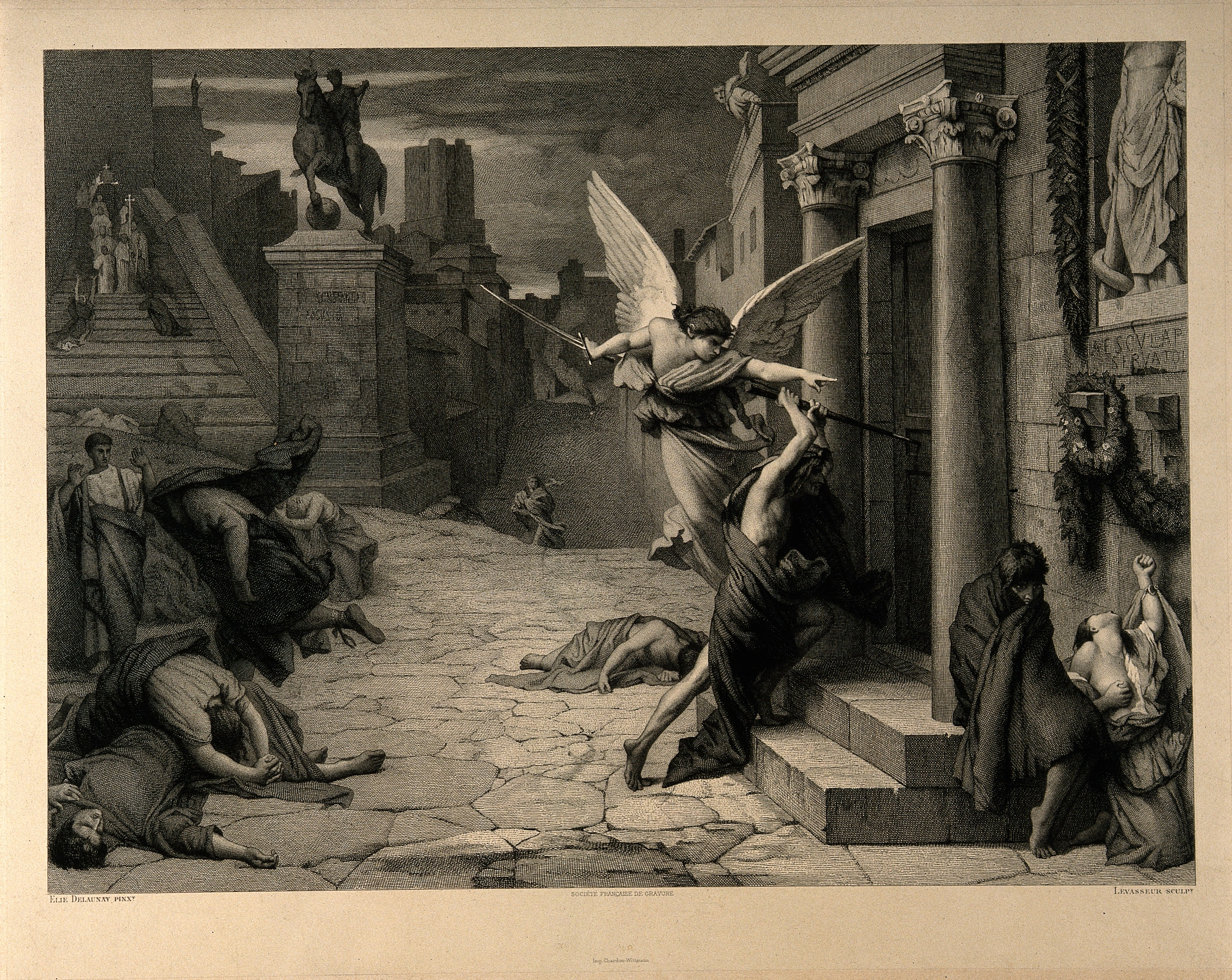
Marcus Aurelius writes down most of his Meditations this decade; The Antonine Plague kills between 5 to 10 million people in the Roman Empire

The 170s decade ran from January 1, 170, to December 31, 179.

== Events ==
=== 170 ===
==== By place ====
====== Roman Empire ======
- The Suebian tribes of the Marcomanni cross the Danube and invade Northern Italy. The Roman army (20,000 men) is destroyed near Carnuntum in Pannonia.
- The Marcomanni plunder Opitergium (modern Oderzo) and besiege Aquileia. This is the first time hostile forces have entered Italy since 101 BC.
- Emperor Marcus Aurelius writes in Sirmium (Pannonia) his first of 12 books of the Meditations in Koine Greek.
- The Costoboci cross the Danube (Dacia) and ravage Thrace in the Balkan Peninsula. They reach Eleusina, near Athens, and destroy the temple of the Eleusinian Mysteries.
- Marcus Aurelius orders humane treatment for Christians and slaves throughout the Roman Empire.
- An Equestrian Statue of Marcus Aurelius is erected in Rome.
- The Porta Nigra is built in Augusta Treverorum (modern Trier). (approximate date)

=== 171 ===
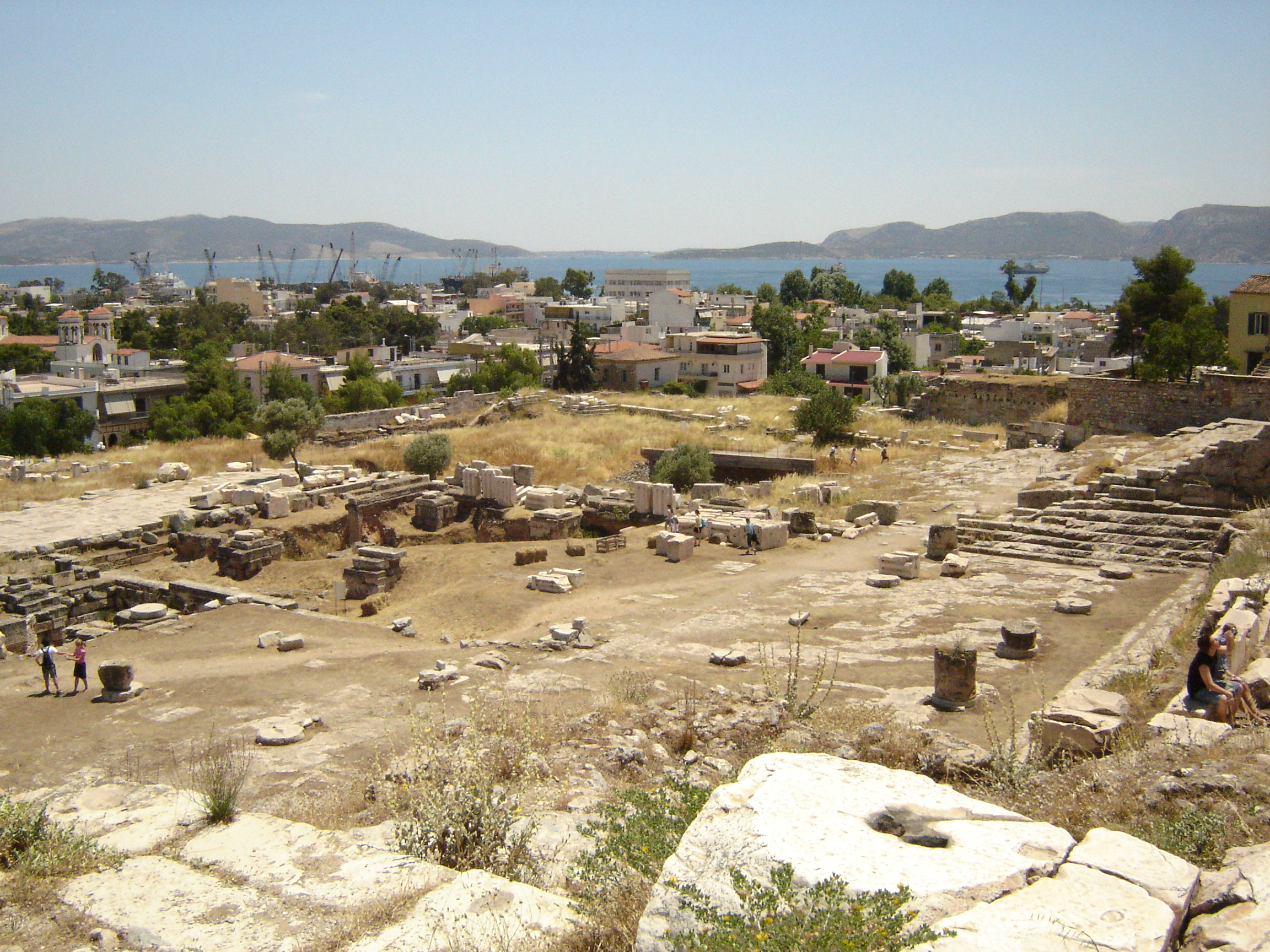
Ruins at Eleusis (Greece). View over the excavation site towards the Saronic Gulf.

==== By place ====
====== Roman Empire ======
- Emperor Marcus Aurelius forms a new military command, the praetentura Italiae et Alpium. Aquileia is relieved, and the Marcomanni are evicted from Roman territory.
- Marcus Aurelius signs a peace treaty with the Quadi and the Sarmatian Iazyges. The Germanic tribes of the Hasdingi (Vandals) and the Lacringi become Roman allies.
- Armenia and Mesopotamia become protectorates of the Roman Empire.
- The Costoboci cross the Danube (Dacia) and ravage Thrace in the Balkan Peninsula. They reach Eleusis, near Athens, and destroy the temple of the Eleusinian Mysteries.
- May – June – Aelius Aristides, Greek orator, delivers a public speech in Smyrna, lamenting the damage recently inflicted to the sacred site of Eleusis.

=== 172 ===
==== By place ====
====== Roman Empire ======
- Emperor Marcus Aurelius crosses the Danube with an expeditionary force. He subdues the Marcomanni and their allies and then, in a pact signed with the Germanic tribes, he imports them into the Roman Empire to occupy areas that have been depopulated by the plague.
- The Sarmatians attack the lower Danube frontier.
- Miracle in Moravia: As the Roman army is encircled by the Quadi under intense heat, a violent thunderstorm sweeps away the Quadi in a torrent of water and mud, and refreshes the parched legionaries.
- Avidius Cassius, governor of Syria, suppresses an agrarian revolt in Egypt and is made supreme commander of the Roman army in the East.

====== Asia ======
- Last (5th) year of Jianning era and start of Xiping era of the Chinese Han dynasty.
- Battle of Jwawon: Goguryeo Prime Minister Myeongnim Dap-bu defeats the Chinese Han dynasty forces in Manchuria.

==== By topic ====
====== Religion ======
- Tatian produces his Diatessaron, a harmony of the four gospels.
- Montanism spreads through the Roman Empire.

=== 173 ===
==== By place ====
====== Roman Empire ======
- Gnaeus Claudius Severus and Tiberius Claudius Pompeianus become Roman Consuls.
- Given control of the Eastern Empire, Avidius Cassius, the governor of Syria, crushes an insurrection of shepherds known as the Boukoloi.

=== 174 ===
==== By place ====
====== Roman Empire ======
- Empress Faustina the Younger accompanies her husband, Marcus Aurelius, on various military campaigns and enjoys the love of the Roman soldiers. Aurelius gives her the title of Mater Castrorum ("Mother of the Camp").
- Marcus Aurelius officially confers the title Fulminata ("Thundering") to the Legio XII Fulminata.

====== Asia ======
- Reign in India of Yajnashri Satakarni, Satavahana king of the Andhra. He extends his empire from the center to the north of India.

==== By topic ====
====== Art and Science ======
- Meditations by Marcus Aurelius is written, in Greek, while on military campaigns in Pannonia (approximate date).

=== 175 ===
==== By place ====
====== Roman Empire ======
- Marcus Aurelius suppresses a revolt of Avidius Cassius, governor of Syria, after the latter proclaims himself emperor.
- Avidius Cassius fails in seeking support for his rebellion and is assassinated by Roman officers. They sent his head to Aurelius, who persuades the Senate to pardon Cassius's family.
- Commodus, son of Marcus Aurelius and his wife Faustina, is named Caesar.
- M. Sattonius Iucundus, decurio in Colonia Ulpia Traiana, restores the Thermae of Coriovallum (modern Heerlen). There are sources that state this happened in the 3rd century.

====== Asia ======
- Confucian scholars try to ensure their capacity in the royal court of China. They are massacred by the eunuchs.

=== 176 ===
==== By place ====
====== Roman Empire ======
- November 27 – Emperor Marcus Aurelius grants his son Commodus the rank of Imperator, and makes him Supreme Commander of the Roman legions.
- December 23 – Marcus Aurelius and Commodus enter Rome after a campaign north of the Alps, and receive a triumph for their victories over the Germanic tribes.
- The Equestrian Statue of Marcus Aurelius is made. It is now kept at Museo Capitolini in Rome (approximate date).

=== 177 ===
==== By place ====
====== Roman Empire ======
- Lucius Aurelius Commodus Caesar (age 15) and Marcus Peducaeus Plautius Quintillus become Roman Consuls.
- Commodus is given the title Augustus, and is made co-emperor, with the same status as his father, Marcus Aurelius.
- A systematic persecution of Christians begins in Rome; the followers take refuge in the catacombs.
- The churches in southern Gaul are destroyed after a crowd accuses the local Christians of practicing cannibalism.
- Forty-eight Christians are martyred in Lyon (Saint Blandina and Pothinus, bishop of Lyon, are among them).
- Second Marcomannic War: Marcus Aurelius and Commodus begin war against the Quadi and the Marcomanni.

====== Asia ======
- Chinese troops suffer a crushing defeat against a confederacy of Central Asian tribes, led by the Xianbei (see Wu Hu).

=== 178 ===
==== By place ====
====== Roman Empire ======
- Bruttia Crispina marries Commodus, and receives the title of Augusta.
- Emperor Marcus Aurelius and his son Commodus arrive at Carnuntum in Pannonia, and travel to the Danube to fight against the Marcomanni.

====== Asia ======
- Last (7th) year of Xiping era and start of Guanghe era of the Chinese Han dynasty.
- In India, the decline of the Kushan Empire begins. The Sassanides take over Central Asia.
- In Hepu and Jiaozhi (modern day Northern Vietnam) during the second Era of Northern Domination, a rebellion led Liang Long broke out and last for three years until it was quelled by general Zhu Jun of the Han dynasty.

====== Religion ======
- The Montanist heresy is condemned for the first time.

=== 179 ===
==== By place ====
====== Roman empire ======
- The Roman fort Castra Regina ("fortress by the Regen river") is built at Regensburg, on the right bank of the Danube in Germany.
- Roman legionaries of Legio II Adiutrix engrave on the rock of the Trenčín Castle (Slovakia) the name of the town Laugaritio, marking the northernmost point of Roman presence in that part of Europe.
- Marcus Aurelius drives the Marcomanni over the Danube and reinforces the border. To repopulate and rebuild a devastated Pannonia, Rome allows the first German colonists to enter territory controlled by the Roman Empire.

====== Asia ======
- Abgar IX the Great becomes King of Edessa.
- Gogukcheon succeeds his father Shindae as King of Goguryeo.
- Han dynasty China: The full title of the Nine Chapters on the Mathematical Art appears on two bronze standard measures dated to this year, yet there is speculation that the same book existed beforehand only under different titles. In the 3rd century, Liu Hui would provide commentary on this important early Chinese mathematical treatise.

== Significant people ==
- Marcus Aurelius, Roman Emperor
- Caerellius Priscus, governor of Roman Britain

== Births ==
170

- Guo Jia, Chinese politician and adviser (d. 207)
- Herodian, Roman historian and writer (d. 240)
- Julia Domna, Roman empress consort (d. 217)
- Pang De, Chinese military general (d. 219)
- Philostratus, Greek sophist (approximate date)
- Vibia Aurelia Sabina, Marcus Aurelius' last surviving child (d. 217)

171

- Sima Lang, Chinese official and politician (d. 217)
- Tian Yu, Chinese general and politician (d. 252)
- Xu Gan, Chinese philosopher and poet (d. 218)
- Zhao Yan, Chinese general and politician (d. 245)

172

- Lu Su, Chinese general and politician (d. 217)
- Xu Miao, Chinese official and politician (d. 249)

173

- Maximinus Thrax ("the Thracian"), Roman emperor (d. 238)
- Mi Heng, Chinese writer and musician (d. 198)

174

- Gao Rou, Chinese general and politician (d. 263)
- Jia Kui, Chinese general and politician (d. 228)
- Tuoba Liwei, Chinese leader of the Tuoba clan (d. 277)
- Zhuge Jin, Chinese general and politician (d. 241)

175

- Ammonius Saccas, Egyptian philosopher (d. 242)
- Pope Pontian (approximate date) of the Catholic Church (d. 235)
- Sun Ce, Chinese general, warlord (d. 200)
- Yang Xiu, Chinese official, adviser (d. 219)
- Zhou Yu, Chinese general, strategist (d. 210)

176

- Fa Zheng, Chinese nobleman and adviser (d. 220)
- Liu Bian, Chinese emperor of the Han dynasty (d. 190)
- Ma Chao, Chinese general and warlord (d. 222)

177

- Cao Ang, Chinese warlord and son of Cao Cao (d.197)
- Huo Jun, Chinese general of the Eastern Han (d. 216)
- Lucius Aurelius Commodus Pompeianus, Roman politician
- Sun Yu, Chinese warlord and cousin of Sun Quan (d. 215)
- Wang Can, Chinese politician, scholar and poet (d. 217)
- Zhu Huan, Chinese general of the Eastern Wu state (d. 238)

178

- Lü Meng, Chinese general (d. 220)
- Peng Yang, Chinese official (d. 214)
- Zhang Cheng, Chinese general (d. 244)

179

- Pang Tong, Chinese adviser of warlord Liu Bei (d. 214)
- Sima Yi, Chinese general and regent (d. 251)

== Deaths ==
170

- Alexander of Abonoteichus, Greek mystic (b. AD 105)
- An Shigao, Chinese Buddhist missionary (b. AD 148)
- Apuleius, Numidian philosopher and writer (b. AD 124)
- Demonax, Greek philosopher and writer (b. c. AD 70)
- Junius Rusticus, Roman teacher and politician (b. AD 100)
- Marcus Cornelius Fronto, Roman grammarian (b. AD 100)
- Ptolemy, Greek mathematician and astronomer (b. AD 100)

172

- Dou Miao (or Huansi), Chinese empress
- Hou Lan, Chinese eunuch-official and politician
- Marcus Macrinius Vindex, Roman praetorian prefect

173

- Donatus of Muenstereifel, Roman soldier and martyr (b. AD 140)

174

- Soter (or Sorterius), bishop of Rome (approximate date)
- Tiberius Julius Eupator, Roman client king

175

- January 14 – Pontianus of Spoleto, Christian martyr (b. 156)
- Avidius Cassius, Roman general, usurper (b. AD 130)
- Concordius of Spoleto, Christian martyr (approximate date)
- Faustina the Younger, Roman empress (b. AD 130)
- Vettius Valens, Greek astrologer, writer (b. AD 120)

176

- Faustina the Younger, Roman empress (b. AD 130)
- Marcus Macrinius Avitus Catonius Vindex, Roman politician

177

- Blandina, Christian martyr and saint (b. 162)
- Herodes Atticus, Greek politician (b. AD 101)
- Polycarpus, Greco-Roman bishop (b. AD 69)
- Pothinus, Roman bishop and martyr (b. AD 87)

178

- February 12 – Agrippinus, patriarch of Alexandria
- Song, Chinese empress of the Han dynasty

179

- Beautiful Lady Yu, Chinese concubine and imperial consort
- Myeongnim Dap-bu, Korean prime minister (b. AD 67)
- Sindae of Goguryeo, Korean ruler (b. AD 89)
- Wang Fu, Chinese court eunuch
