= 156 =

156 may refer to:

- 156 (number), the natural number following 155 and preceding 157
- AD 156, a year
- 156 BC, a year
- 156 (New Jersey bus), United States
- 156 Regiment RLC, United Kingdom
- UFC 156, a mixed martial arts event held by the Ultimate Fighting Championship
- Alfa Romeo 156, a compact executive car
- Martin 156, a very large flying boat aircraft intended for trans-Pacific service
- Radical 156, one of the 20 Kangxi radicals composed of 7 strokes meaning "fun"
- Lectionary 156, a Greek manuscript of the New Testament
- British Rail Class 156, A Train built in 1988 by Metro-Cammell
- Ferrari 156 F1, a Formula One racing car

== See also ==
- Class 156 (disambiguation)
- NH 156 (disambiguation)
