= AD 175 =

175 in various calendars
- Gregorian calendar: 175; CLXXV
- Ab urbe condita: 928
- Assyrian calendar: 4925
- Balinese saka calendar: 96–97
- Bengali calendar: −419 – −418
- Berber calendar: 1125
- Buddhist calendar: 719
- Burmese calendar: −463
- Byzantine calendar: 5683–5684
- Chinese calendar: 甲寅年 (Wood Tiger); 2872 or 2665 — to — 乙卯年 (Wood Rabbit); 2873 or 2666
- Coptic calendar: −109 – −108
- Discordian calendar: 1341
- Ethiopian calendar: 167–168
- Hebrew calendar: 3935–3936
- Hindu calendars
- Vikram Samvat: 231–232
- Shaka Samvat: 96–97
- Kali Yuga: 3275–3276
- Holocene calendar: 10175
- Iranian calendar: 447 BP – 446 BP
- Islamic calendar: 461 BH – 460 BH
- Javanese calendar: 51–52
- Julian calendar: 175; CLXXV
- Korean calendar: 2508
- Minguo calendar: 1737 before ROC 民前1737年
- Nanakshahi calendar: −1293
- Seleucid era: 486/487 AG
- Thai solar calendar: 717–718
- Tibetan calendar: ཤིང་ཕོ་སྟག་ལོ་ (male Wood-Tiger); 301 or −80 or −852 — to — ཤིང་མོ་ཡོས་ལོ་ (female Wood-Hare); 302 or −79 or −851

Year 175 (CLXXV) was a common year starting on Saturday of the Julian calendar. At the time, it was known as the Year of the Consulship of Piso and Iulianus (or, less frequently, year 928 Ab urbe condita). The denomination 175 for this year has been used since the early medieval period, when the Anno Domini calendar era became the prevalent method in Europe for naming years.

== Events ==
=== By place ===
==== Roman Empire ====
- Marcus Aurelius suppresses a revolt of Avidius Cassius, governor of Syria, after the latter proclaims himself emperor.
- Avidius Cassius fails in seeking support for his rebellion and is assassinated by Roman officers. They sent his head to Aurelius, who persuades the Senate to pardon Cassius's family.
- Commodus, son of Marcus Aurelius and his wife Faustina, is named Caesar.
- M. Sattonius Iucundus, decurio in Colonia Ulpia Traiana, restores the Thermae of Coriovallum (modern Heerlen). There are sources that state this happened in the 3rd century.

==== Egypt ====
- The end of the Bucolic War in Egypt.

==== Asia ====
- Confucian scholars try to ensure their capacity in the royal court of China. They are massacred by the eunuchs.

== Births ==
- Ammonius Saccas, Egyptian philosopher (d. 242)
- Pope Pontian (approximate date) of the Catholic Church (d. 235)
- Sun Ce, Chinese general, warlord (d. 200)
- Yang Xiu, Chinese official, adviser (d. 219)
- Zhou Yu, Chinese general, strategist (d. 210)

== Deaths ==
- January 14 – Pontianus of Spoleto, Christian martyr (b. 156)
- Avidius Cassius, Roman general, usurper (b. AD 130)
- Concordius of Spoleto, Christian martyr (approximate date)
- Faustina the Younger, Roman empress (b. AD 130)
- Vettius Valens, Greek astrologer, writer (b. AD 120)
