= Yang Zhong =

Yang Zhong 楊忠

Duke of Sui
- Reign: 2 November 559 – 17 August 568
- Predecessor: none (first holder)
- Successor: Yang Jian
- Born: 507; Wuchuan County, Shuozhou, Inner Mongolia
- Died: 17 August 568 (aged 60–61)
- Consorts: Lü Kutao; Lady Li
- Issue: Yang Jian; Yang Zheng; Yang Zan; Yang Shuang; Yang Song; Princess Cheng'an; Princess Changle; Princess Yang
Names
- Family name: Yang (楊, Yáng); Given name: Zhong (忠, Zhōng)
Posthumous name
- Before 4 March 581: Duke Huan of Sui (隨桓公): After 4 March 581: Emperor Wuyuan (武元皇帝)
Temple name
- Taizu (太祖)
- Father: Yang Zhen (杨祯)
- Mother: Lady Gai (盖氏)

Yang Zhong (楊忠, 507 – 17 August 568), courtesy name Anyu (揜于), childhood name Nunu (奴奴), Xianbei name Puliuru Zhong (普六茹忠), formally known as Duke of Sui (隨國公), was a soldier, later general of the Northern Wei dynasty. He was the father of Yang Jian, the founder of the Sui dynasty.

== Life ==
Yang Zhong was Yang Zhen's son, titled General Who Pacifies the Distance (寧遠將軍). He is described as a tall handsome man with a long beard.

In 534, Dugu Xin attacked Jingzhou (then part of Eastern Wei), and brought Yang Zhong along. After conquering Jingzhou (and killing Eastern Wei's Inspector of Jingzhou (荆州刺史) Xin Zhuan (辛纂)), Yang and Dugu Xin managed to hold it for about half a year, before fleeing to Liang after Eastern Wei counterattacked. While Emperor Wu of Liang bestowed titles upon them, both men returned to Western Wei in 537.

After the establishment of the Northern Zhou dynasty, Yang Zhong was appointed as a marshal and commanded more than ten generals including Yang Zuan (楊纂), Li Mu (李穆), Wang Jie (王傑), Tian Hong (田弘), and Murong Yan (慕容延). Later, together with the 100,000 troops of the Turkic Khanate, they attacked Jinyang, a city located in Northern Qi. In the Northern Zhou dynasty, Yang Zhong was named Duke of Chenliu (陳留郡公), later changed to Duke of Sui (隨國公).

After his son became emperor, he was honored with the title of Emperor Wuyuan (武元皇帝) and his legal wife and the biological mother of Yang Jian, Lady Lü was named Empress Yuanming (元明皇后呂氏).

== Research ==
According to the Book of Zhou and Book of Sui (both compiled during the Tang dynasty), Yang Zhong was born in the Yang clan of Hongnong (弘農楊氏), but this statement is difficult to confirm.

Chen Yinke (陈寅恪), a Chinese historian, did not agree that Yang Jian was from the Yang clan of Hongnong, nor was he born in the northern frontier town of Wuchuan. According to him, Yang Zhong was from a lower class Han Chinese clan in Shandong, as the records state that his wife, Lü Kutao, was from a poor family in Jinan Commandery in the same region. Judging from the strict intermarriage practice among the emminent families at that time, Chen found it dubious that Yang Zhong's family would simply allow him to marry a commoner from Shandong.

However, scholar Wang Tongling (王桐齡) deduced that Yang Jian's family might have Xianbei blood, or perhaps even purely Xianbei, leading to the belief that he was born in the Yang clan of Hongnong.

== Family ==
Consort and their respective issue(s):

- Empress Yuanming, of the Lü clan (元明皇后呂氏), personal name Kutao (苦桃)
  - Princess Cheng'an (成安公主), 1st daughter
    - married Dou Rongding of Henan, Duke of Chenyi (窦荣定 陈懿公河南窦氏;), and had issue (three sons including Dou Kang)
  - Yang Jian, Emperor Wen of Sui (隋文帝 楊堅, 21 July 541 – 13 August 604), 1st son
  - Yang Zheng, Prince Jing of Cai (蔡景王 楊整, 540 – 576), 2nd son
  - Yang Zan, Prince Mu of Teng (滕穆王 楊瓚, 550 – 16 September 591), 3rd son
  - Princess Changle (昌乐公主), 2nd daughter
    - married Doulu Tong, Duke of Nanchen (豆卢通 南陈郡公), and had issues (a son)
  - Princess Yang (楊氏), 3rd daughter
    - married Li Licheng, Duke of Jiang Jun(李礼成 绛郡公)
- Lady Li(李氏)
  - Yang Song, Prince Xuan of Dao (道宣王 楊嵩), 4th son
  - Yang Shuang, Prince Zhao of Wei (衛昭王 楊爽), 5th son
