= AD 156 =

156 in various calendars
- Gregorian calendar: 156; CLVI
- Ab urbe condita: 909
- Assyrian calendar: 4906
- Balinese saka calendar: 77–78
- Bengali calendar: −438 – −437
- Berber calendar: 1106
- Buddhist calendar: 700
- Burmese calendar: −482
- Byzantine calendar: 5664–5665
- Chinese calendar: 乙未年 (Wood Goat); 2853 or 2646 — to — 丙申年 (Fire Monkey); 2854 or 2647
- Coptic calendar: −128 – −127
- Discordian calendar: 1322
- Ethiopian calendar: 148–149
- Hebrew calendar: 3916–3917
- Hindu calendars
- Vikram Samvat: 212–213
- Shaka Samvat: 77–78
- Kali Yuga: 3256–3257
- Holocene calendar: 10156
- Iranian calendar: 466 BP – 465 BP
- Islamic calendar: 480 BH – 479 BH
- Javanese calendar: 32–33
- Julian calendar: 156; CLVI
- Korean calendar: 2489
- Minguo calendar: 1756 before ROC 民前1756年
- Nanakshahi calendar: −1312
- Seleucid era: 467/468 AG
- Thai solar calendar: 698–699
- Tibetan calendar: ཤིང་མོ་ལུག་ལོ་ (female Wood-Sheep); 282 or −99 or −871 — to — མེ་ཕོ་སྤྲེ་ལོ་ (male Fire-Monkey); 283 or −98 or −870

Year 156 (CLVI) was a leap year starting on Wednesday of the Julian calendar. At the time, it was known as the Year of the Consulship of Silvanus and Augurinus (or, less frequently, year 909 Ab urbe condita). The denomination 156 for this year has been used since the early medieval period, when the Anno Domini calendar era became the prevalent method in Europe for naming years.

== Events ==
=== By place ===
==== America ====
- The La Mojarra Stela 1 is produced in Mesoamerica.

=== By topic ===
==== Religion ====
- The heresiarch Montanus first appears in Ardaban (Mysia).

== Births ==
- Dong Zhao, Chinese official and minister (d. 236)
- Ling of Han, Chinese emperor of the Han dynasty (d. 189)
- Pontianus of Spoleto, Christian martyr and saint (d. 175)
- Zhang Zhao, Chinese general and politician (d. 236)
- Zhu Zhi, Chinese general and politician (d. 224)

== Deaths ==
- Marcus Gavius Maximus, Roman praetorian prefect
- Zhang Daoling, Chinese Taoist master (b. AD 34)
