= Matthew Kirtley =

- Born: 6 February 1813; Tanfield, County Durham, England
- Died: 24 May 1873 (aged 60); Derby
- Resting place: Uttoxeter road cemetery Derby
- Known for: Locomotive Engineer
- Relatives: Thomas Kirtley (brother); William Kirtley (nephew)

Matthew Kirtley (6 February 1813 – 24 May 1873) was born at Tanfield, Durham. He was an important early locomotive engineer.

== Career ==
=== Early years ===
At the age of thirteen he began work on the Stockton and Darlington Railway; he was fireman on the Liverpool and Manchester Railway, and was present at its opening. Eventually he became a driver on the London and Birmingham Railway (L&BR). He is believed to have driven the first L&BR train (and the first main line train) to enter London.

=== Midland Railway ===
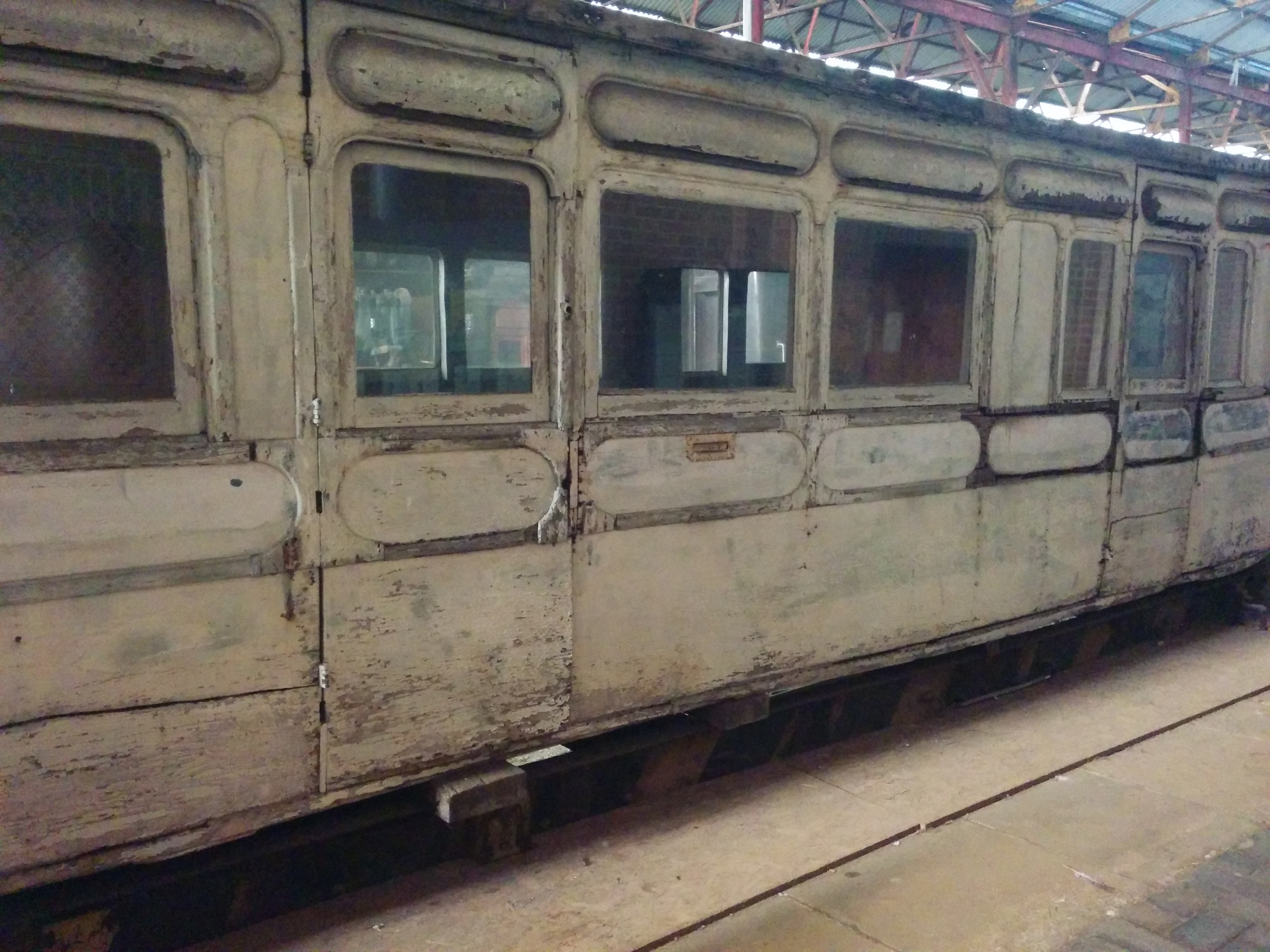
A railway carriage built (it is said in 1876) by Matthew Kirtley for the Metropolitan Railway

In 1839 he was appointed first a locomotive foreman, and then in 1841 Locomotive Superintendent of the Birmingham and Derby Junction Railway. When that railway became one of the constituents of the Midland Railway, he became the Midland's Locomotive Superintendent. He was there Chief Mechanical Engineer from 1844 until he died in 1873. Hundreds of locomotives to his design existed, many of which were to last into the days of the London, Midland and Scottish Railway, some fifty years later.

== Locomotive designs ==
- MR 179 class 0-6-0 (1845)
- MR 137 class 2-4-0 (1846)
- MR 240 class 0-6-0 (1850)
- MR 130 class 2-2-2 (1852)
- MR 270 class 0-6-0 (1852)
- MR 280 class 0-6-0 (1853)
- MR 222 class 0-6-0WT (1860)
- MR 1063 class 0-6-0WT (1860)
- MR 30 class 0-6-0ST (1862)
- MR 50 class 2-4-0 (1862)
- MR 70 class 2-4-0 (1862)
- MR 80 class 2-4-0 (1862)
- MR 221 class 0-6-0ST (1863)
- MR 480 class 0-6-0 (1863)
- MR 101 class 2-4-0 (1866)
- MR 156 class 2-4-0 (1866)
- MR 170 class 2-4-0 (1867)
- MR 204 class 4-4-0T (1868)
- MR 230 class 2-4-0T (1868)
- MR 690 class 0-4-4T (1869)
- MR 700 class 0-6-0 (1869)
- MR 780 class 0-4-4T (1870)
- MR 800 class 2-4-0 (1870)
- MR 880 class 0-6-0T (1871)
- MR 890 class 2-4-0 (1871)
- MR 2066 class 0-6-0WT (1873)

== Family ==
Matthew Kirtley's brother Thomas Kirtley was also a locomotive engineer (on the London, Brighton and South Coast Railway (1847)) as was his nephew, William Kirtley, who served as locomotive superintendent on the London, Chatham and Dover Railway, 1874-1898.

== Legacy ==
The Midland Railway Trust’s collection of locomotives, carriages and wagon is housed in what is now named the Matthew Kirtley Building.

Business positions
New title	Chief Mechanical Engineer of the Midland Railway; 1844–1873	Succeeded by Samuel Waite Johnson
