= Midland Railway 780 Class =

Midland Railway 780 class
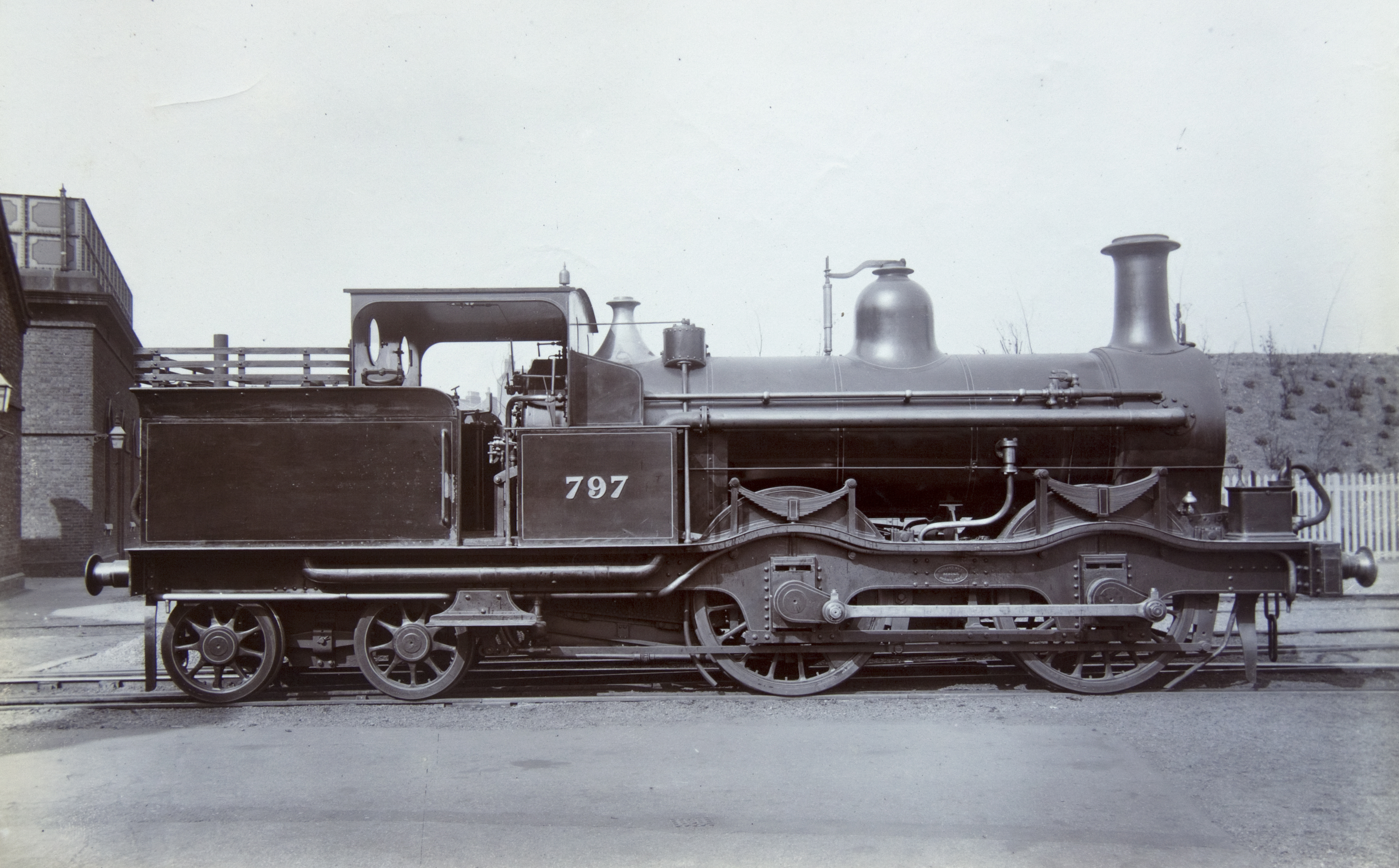
Type and origin
- Power type: Steam
- Designer: Matthew Kirtley
- Builder: Dübs & Co.
- Serial number: 357–376
- Build date: 1870
- Total produced: 20
Specifications
- Configuration
  - Whyte: 0-4-4WT
  - UIC: B2′ n2t
- Gauge: 4 ft 8 1/2 in (1,435 mm)
- Driver dia.: 5 ft 2 in (1.575 m)
- Trailing dia.: 3 ft 0 in (0.914 m)
- Wheelbase
  - Engine: 8 ft 0 in (2.438 m) +; 9 ft 9 in (2.972 m) +; 5 ft 0 in (1.524 m)
- Frame type: Double frame
- Loco weight: 43 long tons 13 cwt (44.4 t)
- Fuel type: Coal
- Boiler
  - Diameter: 4 ft 3 in (1.295 m)
  - Tube plates: 11 ft 0 in (3.35 m)
- Heating surface: 1,072.7 sq ft (99.66 m^{2})
- Cylinders: Two, inside
- Cylinder size: 17 in × 24 in (432 mm × 610 mm)
Career
- Operators: Midland Railway; London, Midland and Scottish Railway
- Numbers: New: 780–799; 1907: 1206–1225
- Withdrawn: 1921–1935
- Disposition: All scrapped

The Midland Railway 780 Class was a class of 0-4-4T steam locomotives. They were built by Dubs & Co. in 1870, and were very similar to the 690 Class. Originally numbers 780–799. They were double-framed engines with a back tank behind the cab under the bunker. They were all originally fitted with condensing apparatus for working the Metropolitan lines.

In 1898, Nos. 780–783 were transferred to the duplicate list as Nos 780A–783A. Their 1907 numbers were 1206–1225. No. 1212 was withdrawn in 1921, but the remaining 19 were inherited by the London, Midland and Scottish Railway at the Grouping in 1923. They were all withdrawn, and were extinct by 1935.

Table of withdrawals
Year	Quantity in service at start of year	Quantity withdrawn	Locomotive numbers	Notes
1921	20	1	1212	
1924	19	1	1223	
1925	18	1	1217	
1927	17	1	1213	
1928	16	3	1206, 1207, 1224	
1930	13	2	1208, 1210	
1931	11	4	1214, 1216, 1218, 1225	
1932	7	1	1215	
1933	6	2	1209, 1220	
1934	4	1	1222	
1935	3	3	1211, 1219, 1221	
