= Emperor Wen of Sui =

Emperor of China from 581 to 604

Emperor Wen of Sui 隋文帝
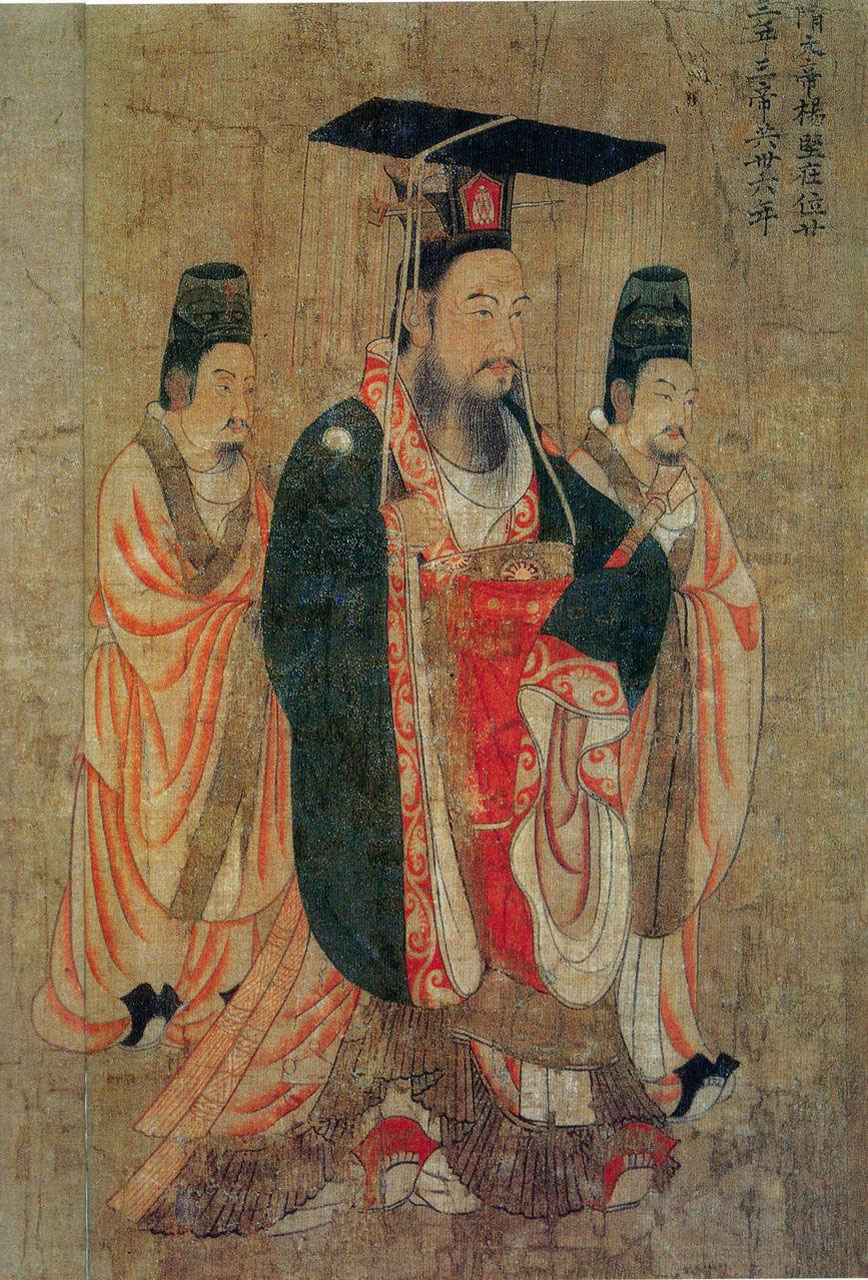
- Tang dynasty portrait of Emperor Wen by Yan Liben (c. 600–673)

Emperor of the Sui dynasty
- Reign: 4 March 581 – 13 August 604
- Predecessor: Dynasty established
- Successor: Emperor Yang
- Born: 21 July 541; Chang'an, Western Wei
- Died: 13 August 604 (aged 63); Renshou Palace, Baoji, Sui China
- Burial: Tai Mausoleum (泰陵)
- Spouse: Empress Wenxian
- Issue: Yang Lihua, Empress of Northern Zhou; Princess Xiangguo; Yang Yong, Prince of Fangling; Yang Guang, Emperor Yang of Sui; Princess Guangping; Yang Jun, Prince of Qin; Yang Xiu, Prince of Shu; Yang Awu, Princess Lanling; Yang Liang, Prince of Han
Names
- Family name: Yang (楊); Given name: Jian (堅)
Era dates
- Kaihuang 開皇 (581–600); Renshou 仁壽 (601–604)
Posthumous name
- Emperor Wen (文皇帝; lit. ''the civil emperor'')
Temple name
- Gaozu (高祖)
- House: Yang
- Dynasty: Sui
- Father: Yang Zhong
- Mother: Lady Lü (Note: Historical records have very little to say on Lady Lü. According to Yang Jian's biography in Book of Sui, Lady Lü once fell ill for three years. Yang Jian waited on her day and night, earning him a reputation of being very filial. The Lü clan was of humble origins, and after Lady Lü left her maternal family, the Yang clan lost contact with the Lüs for some time. An attempt was made to locate the Lüs after the destruction of Northern Qi, without success. Early in the Kaihuang era of Yang Jian's reign, Jinan Commandery informed that a man named Lü Yongji (吕永吉) claimed to have a paternal aunt with the courtesy name "Kutao" (苦桃) who was the wife of Yang Zhong. Lü Yongji's identity as Yang Jian's maternal cousin was eventually verified, and Yang Jian posthumously honored his maternal grandfather Lü Shuangzhou (吕双周) and grandmother Lady Yao.)

Emperor Wen of Sui (隋文帝; 21 July 541 – 13 August 604 (Note: According to Emperor Wen's biography in Book of Sui, he died on the dingwei day of the 7th month of the 4th year of the Renshou era of his reign. This corresponds to 13 Aug 604 in the Julian calendar. Vol.180 of Zizhi Tongjian recorded the same date of death.)), personal name Yang Jian (楊堅), childhood name Naluoyan (那羅延), Xianbei name Puliuru Jian (普六茹堅), was the founding emperor of the Sui dynasty of China. As a Buddhist, he encouraged the spread of Buddhism through the state.

He is credited with reunifying China proper in 589, bringing an end to nearly three centuries of political fragmentation that began with the breakaway of the Cheng-Han and Han-Zhao regimes from the Western Jin in 304. His reign also saw the initiation of the Grand Canal, a major infrastructure project that would later facilitate the integration of northern and southern China.

As a Northern Zhou official, Yang Jian served with apparent distinction during the reigns of the Emperor Wu and Emperor Xuan. When the erratic Emperor Xuan died in 580, Yang, as his father-in-law, seized power as regent. After defeating General Yuchi Jiong, who resisted him, he seized the throne for himself, establishing the new Sui dynasty. Yang Jian was the first ethnic Han ruler to control the entirety of North China after the Xianbei people conquered the region from the Liu Song dynasty (not counting the brief reconquest by Emperor Wu of Liang).

Generally speaking, Emperor Wen's reign was a great period of prosperity, not seen since the Han dynasty. Economically, the nation prospered. It was said that there was enough food stored for 50 years. The military was also powerful. At the beginning of his reign, Sui faced the threat of the Göktürks in the north, neighbored Tibetan tribes in the west, Goguryeo in the northeast, and Champa (Linyi) in the south. By the end of Emperor Wen's reign, the Göktürks had split into an eastern and a western khaganate, the eastern one being nominally submissive to Sui, as was Goguryeo. Champa was defeated and, while not conquered, did not remain a threat.

== Early life ==
Yang Jian was a member of the northwestern Chinese military aristocracy which had arisen during the previous period of division, and he had served as a general under the Xianbei-led Northern Zhou. Yang Jian's family was the Yang clan of Hongnong (弘農楊氏), which had Han origins but had intermarried with the Xianbei for generations. Yang Jian's clan specifically claimed descent from the Han dynasty general Yang Zhen. Yang Zhen's eighth-generation descendant Yang Xuan (楊鉉) served as a commandery governor for a Yan state (Former Yan or Later Yan) during the Sixteen Kingdoms Period, and his descendants subsequently served the Northern Wei dynasty. Yang Jian emphasized Han Chinese cultural identity throughout his reign.

Yang Jian's father was Yang Zhong, a follower of the late-Northern Wei general Yuwen Tai, who later became prominent in the politics of the Western Wei under Yuwen's regency. Due to his achievements, Yang Zhong and his family were bestowed the surname of "Puliuru" (普六茹) as part of Yuwen's Xianbeification policies. Yang Jian's mother was Lady Lü, who gave birth to him in a Buddhist temple in Pingyi (馮翊, in modern Weinan, Shaanxi). A Buddhist nun, Zhixian, was impressed with Yang Jian's appearance, and raised him in his early years. Yang Jian attended the imperial college for the sons of the nobility and high officials. When he was 14 years old, he was appointed to serve in the military under Yuwen Tai.

In 555, on account of Yang Zhong's accomplishments, Yang Jian received several official ranks, including the title of the Duke of Chengji County (成紀縣公). In 557, Dugu Xin, impressed with Yang Jian, gave his daughter, Empress Dugu Qieluo, to Yang and made her his wife. He was 16, and she was 13. After Yuwen Tai's son Emperor Ming of Northern Zhou came to the throne later that year, Yang Jian was made the vice minister of internal affairs, and he was created the greater title of Duke of Daxing Commandery (大興郡公).

During the reign of Emperor Ming's brother Emperor Wu, Yang Jian was further promoted in military authority. After Yang Zhong's death in 568, he inherited the title of Duke of Sui. In 573, Emperor Wu took Yang Jian's daughter Yang Lihua to be the wife and crown princess of his son Yuwen Yun the Crown Prince, and further honored Yang Jian.

However, Yang Jian was suspected to have treasonous intentions due to his unusual appearance. Both Emperor Wu's brother Yuwen Xian, the Prince of Qi and the general Wang Gui (王軌) have suggested that Emperor Wu execute Yang Jian, but Emperor Wu rejected. To avoid trouble, Yang Jian tried to hide his talents.

It was not until 575 when Emperor Wu involved Yang Jian in a major campaign against rival Northern Qi. Yang Jian also participated in the 576–577 campaign that saw Emperor Wu being able to destroy Northern Qi and seize its territory.

In 578, Emperor Wu died, and Yuwen Yun took the throne as Emperor Xuan. While he created Yang Jian's daughter Crown Princess Yang empress, he suspected Yang Jian deeply, although he made Yang Jian the minister of defense.

In 579, Emperor Xuan passed the throne to his young son Yuwen Chan (by his concubine Consort Zhu Manyue), who became Emperor Jing, while Emperor Xuan became the retired emperor (with the title of "Emperor Tianyuan" (Tianyuan Huangdi), but continued to exercise imperial powers.

On one occasion, Emperor Xuan became so suspicious of Yang Jian that he threatened, "I will surely slaughter your clan!" He summoned Yang Jian to the palace, instructing that he be killed if his expressions revealed any sign of concern. However, Yang Jian arrived without betraying any emotions and avoided execution.

== Regency ==
In the summer of 581, Emperor Xuan intended to conquer Chen dynasty and sent Yang Jian to be the commandant at Yang Province (揚州, roughly modern Lu'an, Anhui) for the campaign. However, Before Yang Jian could depart, Emperor Xuan suddenly fell seriously ill. Two of Emperor Xuan's close associates, Liu Fang (劉昉) and Zheng Yi (鄭譯), who were friends of Yang's, summoned Yang to the palace to prepare to serve as regent. This action overrode another influential associate, Yan Zhiyi (顏之儀), who had supported the idea of appointing Emperor Xuan's uncle, Yuwen Zhao (宇文招), the Prince of Zhao, as regent. Emperor Xuan soon died, and Zheng and Liu issued an edict in Emperor Xuan's name appointing Yang regent.

Yang, as the regent, abolished the wastefulness and cruel policies of Emperor Xuan, and he himself demonstrated both hard work and frugality, which impressed the people. Yang Jian, concerned about the potential threat posed by General Yuchi Jiong, summoned him back to the capital. However, Yuchi refused, believing that Yang Jian might be attempting to usurp the throne. Yuchi then rose at Xiang Province against Yang. He was supported by the generals Sima Xiaonan (司馬消難), the commandant at Xun Province (勛州, roughly modern Xiaogan, Hubei) and Wang Qian (王謙), the commandant at Yi Province (roughly modern Chengdu, Sichuan). Within 68 days, general Wei Xiaokuan defeated Yuchi, who eventually committed suicide. Wang Qian was also defeated, and Sima fled to Chen. To prevent Yuchi's former headquarters at Yecheng from being used as a base of opposition, Yang Jian ordered the city to be demolished.

During Yuchi's campaign, Zhou princes like Yuwen Xian Prince of Bi and Yuwen Zhao made attempts to assassinate Yang, but failed. In response, Yang put Yuwen Xian, Yuwen Zhao and Zhao's younger brother Yuwen Sheng (宇文盛) the Prince of Yue and their sons to death, and after Yuchi was defeated, he began to eliminate the Yuwen clan systematically. He also had Emperor Jing promote his titles quickly, and he changed his surname from Puliuru back to Yang. Around the beginning of 581, his title was promoted to Prince of Sui (隨王). In spring 581, he had Emperor Jing yield the throne to him, ending Northern Zhou and establishing Sui dynasty. Yang's choice of "Sui" as the name for his new dynasty was typical of Chinese historical dynastic transitions—using the old fief name as the new dynasty's name—but he, believing that the character for his fief Sui (隨) to contain a "辶" radical, denoting "walking" and therefore a lack of permanence in the regime, removed "辶" from the character, rendering it "隋".

== Early Kaihuang era ==
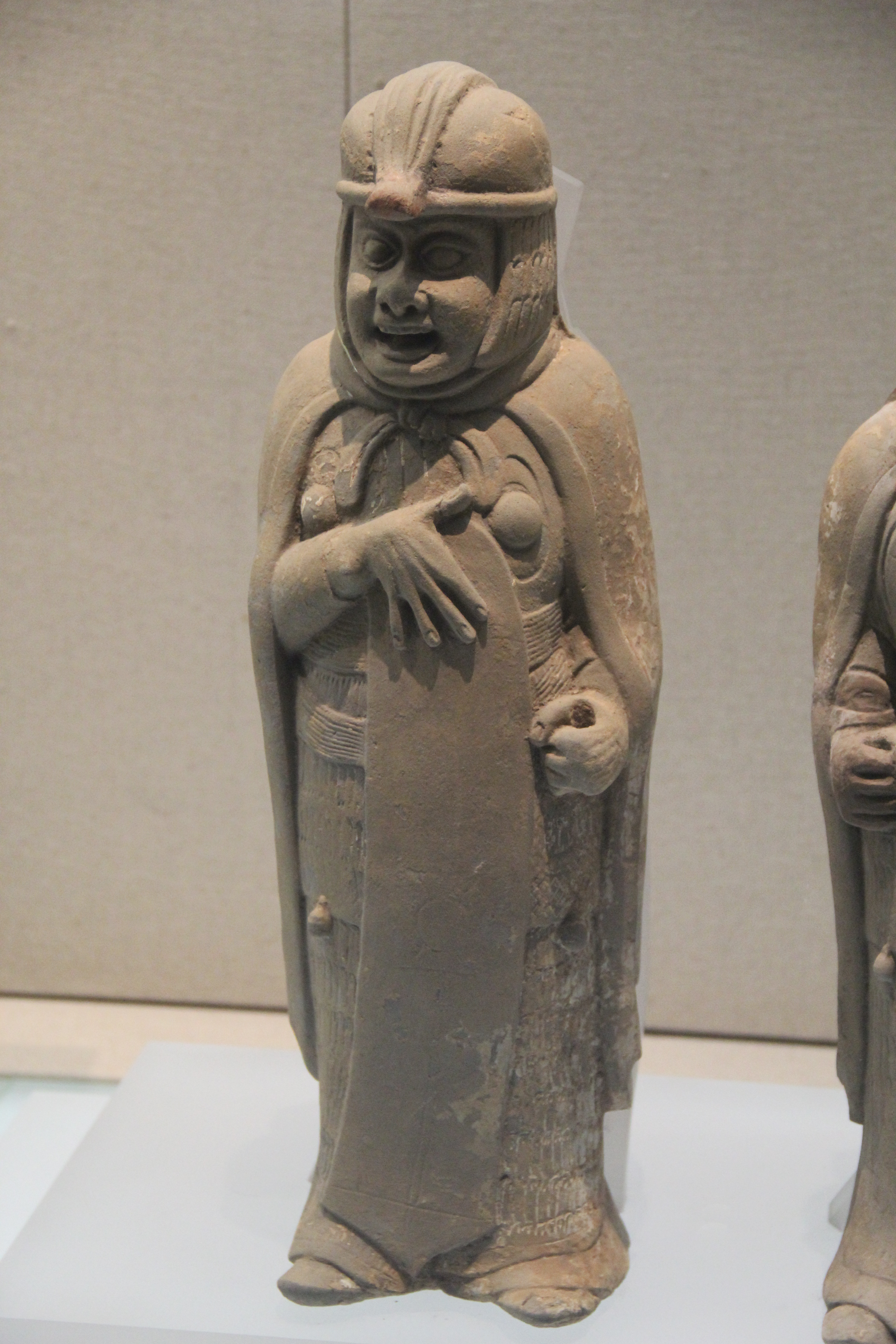
Tomb guardian figurine, Sui dynasty

The Book of Sui records Emperor Wen as having withdrawn his favour from the Confucians, giving it to "the group advocating Legalism and authoritarian government." Emperor Wen abolished Northern Zhou's governmental organization of six departments, instead establishing five main bureaus—executive bureau (Shangshu Sheng (尚書省)), examination bureau (Menxia Sheng (門下省)), legislative bureau (Neishǐ Sheng (內史省)), Palace Library, and eunuch bureau (Neishì Sheng (內侍省—note different tone and character versus 'legislative bureau')), with two additional independent agencies, 11 other independent departments, and 12 military commands.

Yang Jian posthumously honored his father, Yang Zhong, and his mother, Lady Lü, as emperor and empress. He made his wife, Duchess Dugu, empress and their eldest son, Yang Yong, crown prince. He also granted imperial titles to his brothers and other sons. Initially, he created Emperor Jing of Northern Zhou the Duke of Jie but later ordered the execution of all grandsons of Yuwen Tai, including the Duke of Jie. He assigned most of the important governmental matters to his officials Gao Jiong, Yang Su, and Su Wei. He also sent his sons out to key provinces with broad powers. Additionally, he commissioned the official Pei Zheng to carry out a project aimed at simplifying the penal code and reducing the penalties of harsh laws, a reform that was later largely accepted by subsequent dynasties.

Emperor Wen did not maintain as submissive a relationship with the Göktürks, which brought resentment from the Göktürks' Ishbara Qaghan. In response to border attacks from the Göktürks and an alliance with Gao Baoning, a former general of Northern Qi who still controlled Ying Province, Emperor Wen, advised by General Zhangsun Sheng, implemented a strategy to create divisions within the Göktürks by placating Ishbara's subordinate qağans. This strategy successfully prevented the Göktürks from acting united against Sui.

In 581, Emperor Wen commissioned a major attack on Chen, and while it was initially successful, Emperor Wen withdrew the attack in spring 582 after hearing that Emperor Xuan of Chen had died, believing it wrong to attack a state whose emperor had just died.

In 582, believing that Chang'an was too small of a city, Emperor Wen built a new capital near the ancient city of Luoyang, which he named Daxing, and in spring 583 he moved the capital to Daxing.

Also in 582, Emperor Wen, grateful for Emperor Ming of Western Liang's refusal to support Yuchi Jiong in 580, withdrew his forces from Western Liang's capital, Jiangling, allowing the state a degree of self-governance. He also arranged for Emperor Ming's daughter to marry his son, Yang Guang, the Prince of Jin. However, after Emperor Ming's death in 585 and the succession of his son, Emperor Jing of Western Liang, Emperor Wen reestablished the commandant post in Jiangling and placed Western Liang under military control again.

By spring 583, the internal dissension within the Göktürks had become significant enough that Emperor Wen felt confident in commissioning his brother, Yang Shuang (楊爽), the Prince of Wei, to lead a major attack against Ashina Shetu. Yang Shuang achieved victory, and part of his army, led by General Yin Shou, defeated Gao, who attempted to flee to the Qidan but was killed by his own subordinates, marking the end of Northern Qi resistance. After this defeat, the various subordinate khans engaged in further battles among themselves and against Ashina Shetu, while Sui chose not to intervene. By 584, Ashina Shetu submitted to Sui.

In the summer of 584, believing that the Wei River's sandbars and treacherous waters made food transport to Daxing difficult, Emperor Wen commissioned the official Yuwen Kai (宇文愷) to construct the Guangtong Canal (廣通渠) between Daxing and Tong Pass, parallel to the Wei River. This canal greatly facilitated the transport of food and supplies to the Guanzhong region. However, due to a famine in Guanzhong in the fall of 584, Emperor Wen briefly relocated to Luoyang.

In 586, the officials Liang Shiyan (梁士彥) the Duke of Cheng, Yuwen Xin (宇文忻) the Duke of Qi, and Liu Fang the Duke of Shu—all three of whom were friends of Emperor Wen but all of whom believed that they had been slighted by Emperor Wen—were accused of plotting rebellion, and all three were executed.

In spring 587, continuing his canal-building regime, Emperor Wen built the Shanyang Canal (山陽瀆) between the Yangtze River and the Huai River to improve the transport of material between those two rivers.

In the fall of 587, Emperor Wen summoned Emperor Jing of Western Liang to Chang'an, and Emperor Jing complied. However, while Emperor Jing was away, Emperor Wen, fearing that Jiangling would be poorly guarded, sent General Cui Hongdu (崔弘度) to the city. Emperor Jing's uncle, Xiao Yan (蕭巖), the Prince of Anping, and Xiao Huan (蕭瓛), the Prince of Yixing, mistakenly believed that Cui intended to attack, so they surrendered the city to Chen General Chen Huiji (陳慧紀), who is also the cousin of Chen Emperor. In response, Emperor Wen abolished Western Liang, directly seizing its territory and making Emperor Jing the Duke of Ju. In the spring of 588, he publicly announced a campaign against Chen, with his son Yang Guang, along with Yang Jun, the Prince of Qin, and Yang Su in command, and Yang Guang as the overall leader. Gao Jiong was appointed as Yang Guang's assistant.

In the spring of 589, the Sui army captured the capital of Chen, Jiankang, and the Emperor of Chen was captivated. The Sui quickly gained control of the region, and Emperor Wen ordered the destruction of Jiankang, marking the end of the Northern and Southern dynasties period.

== Late Kaihuang era ==
After Chen was conquered, Sui began to apply its laws over Chen's former territory—which brought resentment from the gentry, as they had been treated preferentially under Chen and its predecessor dynasties in the south. In 590, rumors spread that Sui planned to relocate Chen subjects to the Guanzhong region, leading to widespread but disorganized rebellions. Emperor Wen sent army to suppress the uprisings, and within the year, the rebellions were quelled.

In 591, Tuyuhun sought peace and its khan Murong Shifu (慕容世伏) sent his daughter to be a concubine for Emperor Wen. Emperor Wen accepted the peace offer but declined the offer of Murong Shifu's daughter.

In 592, Emperor Wen reduced taxes due to an abundance of food and silk in government stores, and he also sent messengers across central China to redistribute land, providing farming land to the poor.

In 593, Emperor Wen commissioned the construction of a summer vacation palace, Renshou Palace (仁壽宮), which is away from capital Chang'an. The palace was completed in 595, and turned out to be more luxurious than expected and caused many deaths during its construction.

In 594, due to a famine in the Guanzhong region, Emperor Wen temporarily moved to Luoyang. To share in the suffering of his people, he abstained from eating meat for a year.

Late in 594, Crown Prince Yang Guang petitioned Emperor Wen to carry out the ancient ceremonies of worshipping the heaven and earth gods at Mount Tai. Emperor Wen declined a full ceremony due to its cost but conducted a shortened version in spring 595 to seek blessings for the ongoing drought.

Also in spring 595, Emperor Wen ordered that no weapons be held by private individuals and that all of them be collected and destroyed, although he exempted the border provinces from this edict.

In 596, Emperor Wen married Princess Guanghua to Murong Shifu, to cement the peaceful relations with Tuyuhun.

In 597, Cuan Wan (爨翫), the chief of the Nanning Tribe (南寧夷, located in modern Qujing, Yunnan), rebelled. Emperor Wen sent the general Shi Wansui (史萬歲), the Duke of Taiping against Cuan, forcing him to surrender. Initially, Shi was to take Cuan to Chang'an to be presented to Emperor Wen, but Cuan bribed Shi, and so Shi allowed him to stay. Also in 597, Li Guangshi (李光仕), the chief of the aborigine people in Gui Province (桂州, roughly modern Guilin, Guangxi), also rebelled. Emperor Wen sent the generals Wang Shiji (王世積) and Zhou Fashang (周法尚) against Li, and Zhou was able to defeat and kill Li.

In the same year, Emperor Wen strengthened laws regarding official misconduct and theft. He authorized supervising officials to use canes to punish their subordinates if they felt the legal penalties were insufficient for the misconduct. Additionally, he increased the punishment for theft to death, although this law was later abolished.

Still in 597, Emperor Wen's son Yang Jun the Prince of Qin, the commandant at Bing Province (并州, roughly Taiyuan, Shanxi), was poisoned, but not to death, by his wife Princess Cui. After Yang Jun was taken back to Chang'an for treatment, Emperor Wen discovered his wastefulness at his post and removed him from his offices, allowing him to retain only his title of imperial prince. When officials suggested that the punishment against Yang Jun was overly severe, Emperor Wen responded to Yang Su:

I am the father of just five sons, not the father of all people over the land. If I agreed with you, does that mean I have to draft a Penal Code for the Emperor's Sons? Even a man as kind as the Duke of Zhou executed his brothers, the lords of Guan and Cai, for their crimes. I am nowhere as capable as the Duke of Zhou, so I can break my own laws?

Also in 597, Ashina Rangan, a chef of Göktürks, arrived at Chang'an, and Emperor Wen married Princess Anyi him and awarded Ashina Rangan with treasure, to try to break the bond between him and Ashina Yongyulü, another chef of Göktürks. From this point on, whenever Ashina Yongyulü would prepare to attack, Ashina Rangan would report his plans to Emperor Wen, allowing Sui forces to become prepared.

In 598, King Yeongyang of Goguryeo attacked Ying Province. While the governor of Ying Province resisted the attack, Emperor Wen sent his son, Yang Liang, the Prince of Han, to lead a campaign against Goguryeo. However, the campaign encountered severe difficulties, including food shortages and a storm that caused significant losses to the navy. Both on land and at sea, Goguryeo forces inflicted heavy losses on the Sui. Despite this, King Yeongyang ceased his raids into China, and Emperor Wen called off the campaign because Sui is unable to commit further resources after the recent setbacks.

Also in 598, Cuan Wan rebelled again, and Yang Xiu accused Shi of accepting bribes from Cuan earlier. Emperor Wen considered executing Shi, but ultimately chose only to remove him from his posts.

In 599, after Ashina Rangan reported that Ashina Yongyulü was planning to attack, Emperor Wen took preemptive action and had Gao Jiong, Yang Su, and Yan Rong (燕榮) command a three-pronged attack against Ashina Yongyulü, with Yang Liang in nominal command but not at the frontline. In response, Ashina Yongyulü and Ashina Dianjue made a joint attack against Ashina Rangan, defeating him and largely seizing his tribe. Ashina Rangan fled to Sui, and Emperor Wen treated him as an honored guest. Subsequently, both Gao Jiong and Yang Su engaged Göktürk forces and repelled them.

Also in 599, with Wang Shiji's subordinate Huangfu Xiaoxie (皇甫孝諧) accusing Wang of treason after Wang refused to shield Huangfu after he committed crimes, Emperor Wen believed Huangfu and executed Wang.

By this time, Yang Yong the Crown Prince had lost the favor of both Emperor Wen and Empress Dugu, because he was overly wasteful and having too many concubines. They therefore considered deposing him and replacing him with Yang Guang.

In the winter of 599, Emperor Wen created Ashina Rangan Qimin Khan, and commissioned Zhangsun Sheng to build the city of Dali (大利, in modern Hohhot) to house Ashian Rangan's people, and also sent an army to protect Ashina Rangan. By this time, the Princess Anyi had died, and Emperor Wen married Princess Yicheng (義成公主) to Ashina Rangan. Thereafter, Ashina Yongyulü was assassinated, and Ashina Dianjue declared himself Bujia Khan. In the summer of 600, Ashina Dianjue attacked Ashina Rangan, and Sui forces fought off Ashina Dianjue's attack, further causing Ashina Rangan to be grateful to Sui.

In fall 600, with Yang Guang and Yang Su forming a faction, with tacit support of Empress Dugu, they had Yang Yong's associate Ji Wei (姬威) falsely accuse Yang Yong of plotting treason. Emperor Wen deposed Yang Yong and replaced him with Yang Guang.

== Renshou era ==
In 602, Empress Dugu died, and Emperor Wen was greatly saddened.

Also in 602, Crown Prince Yang Guang believed that Yang Xiu would pose a threat for him. He had Yang Su collect evidence of Yang Xiu's wastefulness and use of items that were only appropriate for emperors. After Yang Su submitted the evidence to Emperor Wen, Yang Xiu was recalled to the capital. Yang Guang further fabricated evidence that Yang Xiu had cursed Emperor Wen. Emperor Wen then reduced Yang Xiu to commoner rank and placed him under house arrest.

In 603, Ashina Dianjue, faced with rebellions from the Tiele and Pugu (僕骨) tribes, surrendered to Ashina Rangan. By now, Ashina Rangan became the khan of the Göktürks.

In spring 604, Emperor Wen, as per his custom, went to Renshou Palace to avoid the heat. While at the palace, he fell ill, and in the fall of 604, he died. Emperor Wen was buried at the Tailing (泰陵) tumulus mausoleum in the Yangling District, with Empress Dugu buried nearby, though not in the same burial chamber.

How Emperor Wen died is controversial. According to most traditional historians, while Emperor Wen was ill, Yang Guang attempted to rape one of his concubines. When the concubine reported this to Emperor Wen, he became angry and ordered the officials Liu Shu (柳述, husband of his daughter, Princess Lanling) and Yuan Yan (元巖), Duke of Longgu, to summon Yang Yong with the intent of restoring him to power. After learning of this, Yang Guang, with the help of Yang Su, had Liu and Yuan arrested. Yang Guang then sent his associate, Zhang Heng, to kill Emperor Wen. Afterward, Yang Guang had Yang Yong executed, and only then announced Emperor Wen's death before taking the throne as Emperor Yang.

The historian Sima Guang, in his Zizhi Tongjian, borrowing parts of analyses from the Book of Sui and the History of the Northern Dynasties, opined:

Gaozu [Emperor Wen's temple name] was by nature cautious and solemn, and he always made sure that his orders are carried out, whether it be an order for an affirmative act or for a prohibition. He got up early in the morning to host imperial gatherings, and he would not appear tired even after noon. Although he was himself stingy, but he did not hold back his awards when rewarding the people with accomplishments. He gave much compensation to the families of soldiers who died in battle, and sent messengers to comfort them. He loved his people, encouraging them to till the field and grow mulberries, and decreasing their labor and tax burdens. He himself lived simply and frugally, and the vessels and clothes he used, even after they became worn out, continued to be patched and used. Except at feasts, his meals would contain a single meat dish. The clothes of the palace women were continued to be used even after they were washed. Based on his influence, during his reign, men only wore cotton and cloth, not silk, and their decorations were made of copper, iron, bones, and horns, not gold, silver, or gemstones. There were bountiful productions of food and textile, so much so that the storage was insufficient for them. At the start of his reign, the census rolls only had less than four million households, but at the end of his reign, there were almost nine million households, and Ji Province [(冀州, roughly modern Hengshui, Hebei)] by itself contained one million households. However, he was suspicious, critical, and picky, believing many alienating words of his officials. Therefore, even of those with the most accomplishments and his old friends, not one was able to maintain the relationship from start to end. He even treated his own sons as enemies. These were his faults.

Emperor Wen also established seven orchestras comprising musicians from across Asia at his court; these orchestras were expanded to nine by his son Emperor Yang of Sui.

== Family ==
- Empress Wenxian, of the Dugu clan of Henan (文獻皇后 河南獨孤氏; 544–602), personal name Qieluo (伽羅)
  - Princess Leping (樂平公主; 561–609), personal name Lihua (麗華), first daughter
    - Married Yuwen Yun (559–580) in 573, and had issue (two daughters)
  - Princess Xiangguo (襄国公主), second daughter
    - Married Li Changya, Duke of Heyang (李長雅)
  - Yang Yong, Prince of Fangling (房陵王 楊勇; 568–604), first son
  - Yang Guang, Emperor Yang (煬皇帝 楊廣; 569–618), second son
  - Princess Guangping (廣平公主), third daughter
    - Married Yuwen Jingli, Duke of Ande (宇文靜禮), and had issue (two sons)
  - Yang Jun, Prince Xiao of Qin (秦孝王 楊俊; 571–600), third son
  - Fourth daughter
  - Yang Xiu, Prince of Shu (蜀王 楊秀; 573–618), fourth son
  - Princess Lanling (蘭陵公主; 573–604), personal name Awu (阿五), fifth daughter
    - Married Wang Fengxiao (王奉孝; d. 583) in 580
    - Married Liu Shu of Hedong, Duke of Jian'an (河東 柳述) in 585
  - Yang Liang, Prince of Han (漢王 楊諒; 575–605), fifth son
- Madame Xuanhua, of the Chen clan of Yingchuan (宣華夫人 潁川陳氏; 577–605)
- Madame Ronghua, of the Cai clan (容华夫人 蔡氏)

Emperor Wen of Sui House of Yang Born: 541 Died: 604
Regnal titles
Preceded by Emperor Jing of Northern Zhou; Emperor Jing of Western Liang; Chen Shubao	Emperor of China; Sui; 581–604	Succeeded by Emperor Yang of Sui
Chinese royalty
Preceded by Himself as Duke of Sui	Prince of Sui; 581	Merged into the Crown
Chinese nobility
Unknown	Duke of Chengji; 555–557	Unknown
Unknown	Duke of Daxing; 557–568	Unknown
Preceded by Yang Zhong	Duke of Sui; 568–581	Succeeded by Himself as Prince of Sui
