= Midland Railway 480 Class =

Class of 267 British double-framed 0-6-0 locomotives

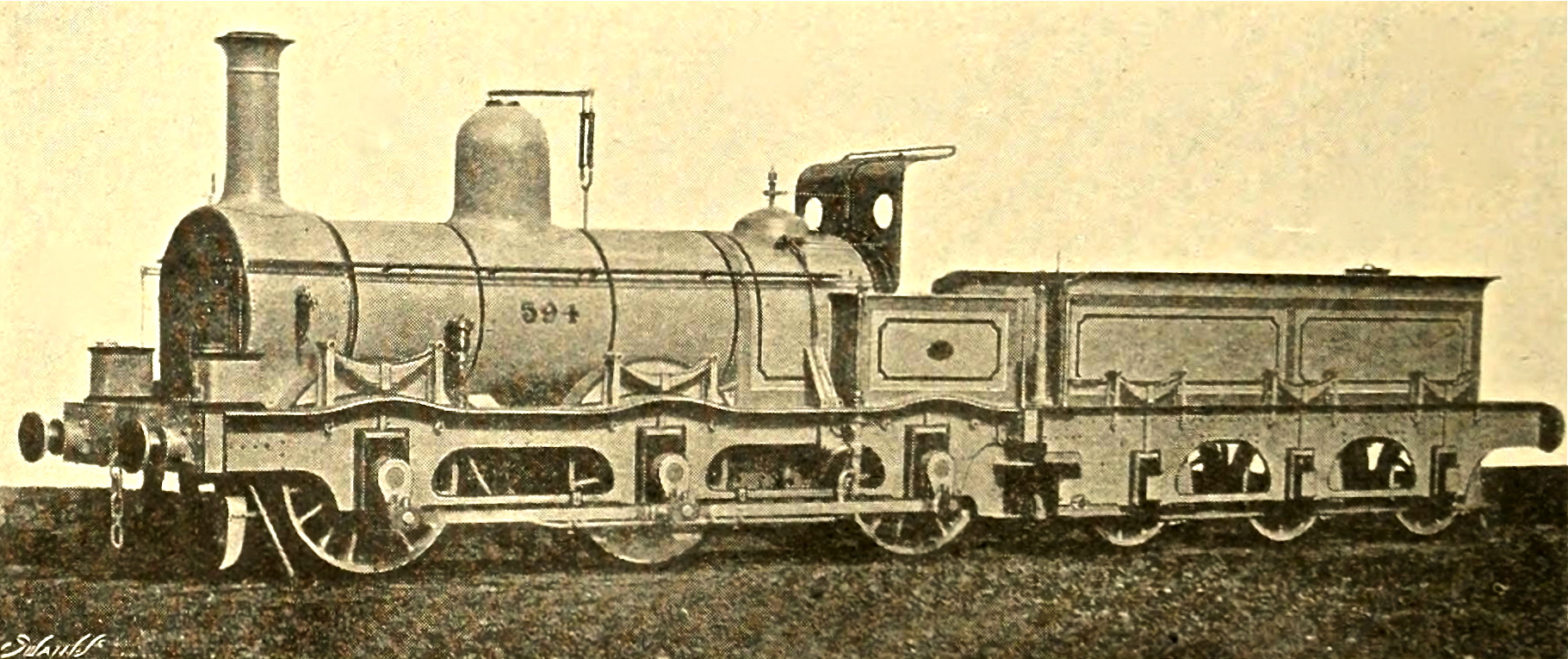
Type and origin
- Power type: Steam
- Designer: Matthew Kirtley
- Builder: Derby Works (77); Dübs & Co. (20); Robert Stephenson & Co. (65); Kitson & Co. (45); Sharp, Stewart & Co. (20); Yorkshire Engine Co. (10)
- Build date: 1863–1869
- Total produced: 237
Specifications
- Configuration
  - Whyte: 0-6-0
  - UIC: C n2
- Gauge: 4 ft 8 1/2 in (1,435 mm)
- Coupled dia.: 5 ft 2 1/2 in (1,588 mm)
- Fuel type: Coal
- Boiler pressure: 140 lbf/in^{2} (0.97 MPa)
- Heating surface: 1,107 sq ft (102.8 m^{2})
- Cylinders: Two, inside
- Cylinder size: 16 1/2 in × 24 in (419 mm × 610 mm)
Career
- Operators: Midland Railway; London, Midland and Scottish Railway
- Power class: 1F
- Withdrawn: 1902–1946
- Disposition: All scrapped

The Midland Railway 480 Class was a class of double framed 0-6-0 steam locomotive, designed by Matthew Kirtley for the Midland Railway of Britain. They were built between 1863 and 1868.

== Development ==
They were a development of the 240 Class, with curved frames, and were themselves developed into the 700 Class.

== Ownership ==
In total, 237 were built. Most survived to London, Midland and Scottish Railway (LMS) ownership in 1923, but only three survived the mass withdrawals of the late 1920s and early 1930s.

== Numbering ==
After the Midland Railway's 1907 renumbering scheme, the numbers were:

- 2398–2591 and
- 2672–2686

This totals 209 locomotives, as 28 had been withdrawn between 1902 and 1906.
