= Zhixian (Buddhist nun) =

Chinese Buddhist nun who raised emperor Wen (sixth century)

Zhixian (智仙, surnamed Liu 劉, fl. 541 – 574) was a Chinese Buddhist nun who raised emperor Wen of the Sui dynasty. She is said to have made several prophecies that Wen, whom she looked after from his birth until he was twelve, would become emperor and restore Buddhism. Later she sheltered with his family from the suppression of Buddhism by Emperor Wu of Northern Zhou. When Wen became emperor, he upheld Buddhism and distributed images celebrating Zhixian across the empire.

== Raising Wen ==
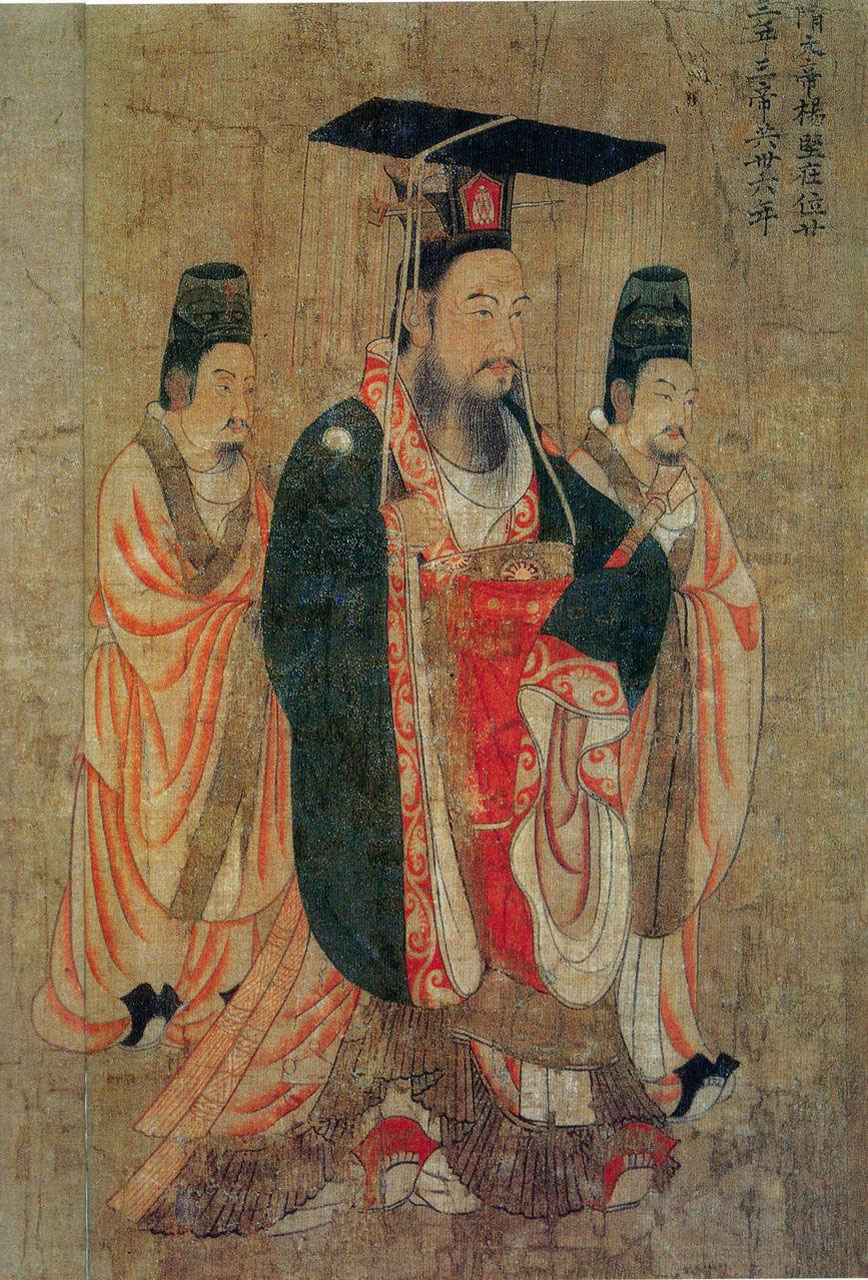
Emperor Wen of Sui, whom Zhixian raised until he was twelve

Originally from Pufan in modern-day Shaanxi, Zhixian took up meditation at the age of seven, and became a Buddhist nun at the Bore monastery at Tongzhou. She is said to have gained a reputation that her predictions about people came true. She took responsibility for raising Yang Jian (the future emperor Wen) in a Buddhist convent within his family home from his birth in 541, saying that he should not be raised in an ordinary household.

The court diarist Wang Shao reports a vision that Yang Jian’s mother, Lü, had of the child turning into a dragon while she was holding him. Lü dropped the child in surprise, and Zhixian prophesied that this would lead to Yang Jian becoming emperor later than he would have otherwise. When the child was seven years old, Zhixian predicted that he would restore Buddhism. (Note: The thirteenth-century chronicle Fozu Tongji repeats the dragon anecdote. See Jülch (2021).)

== Later life and legacy ==
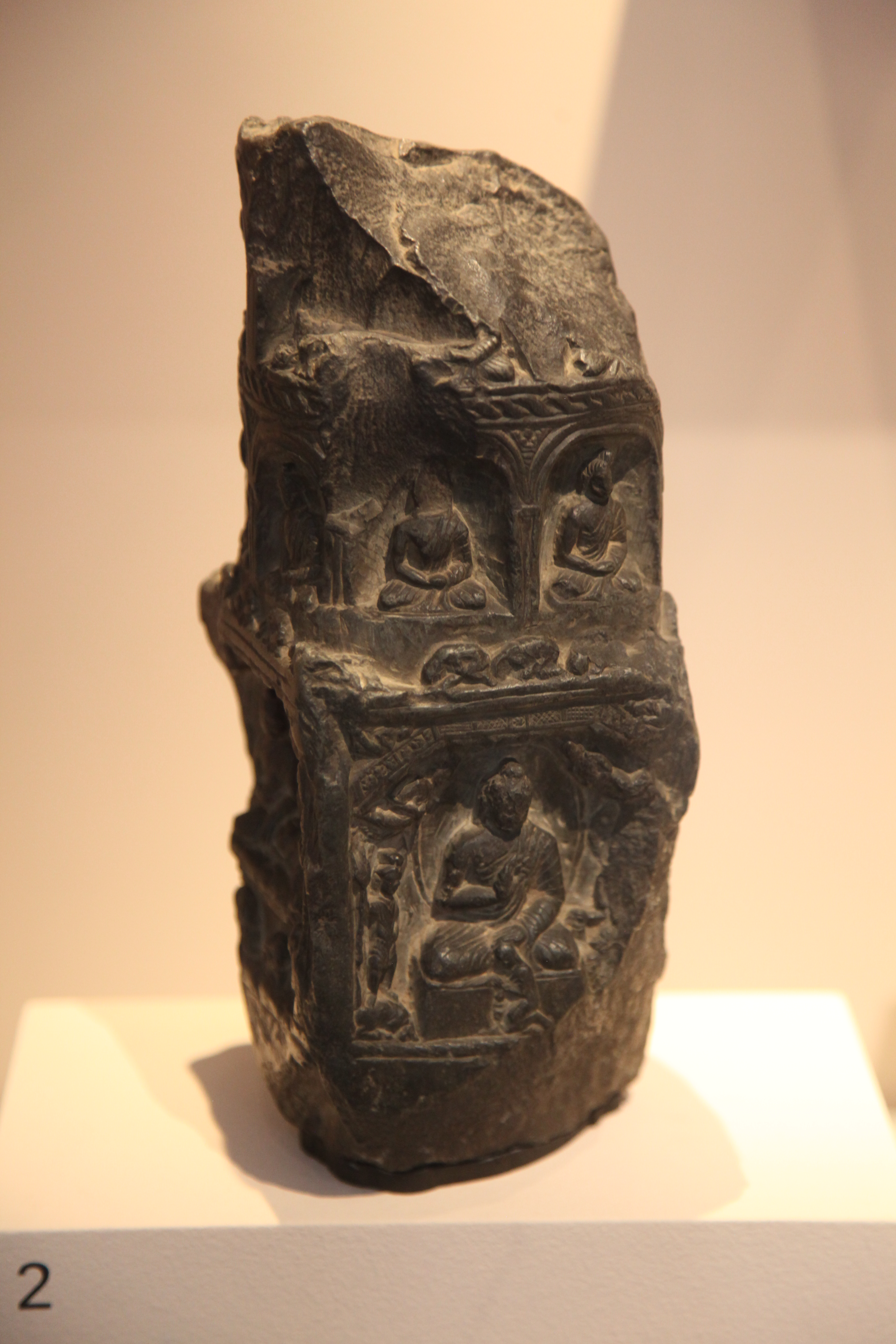
Example of a sixth-century Chinese votive image from a stupa

Later, when Emperor Wu of Northern Zhou began a proscription of Buddhism and Taoism in 574, Zhixian sheltered in the home of Yang Jian (then Duke of Sui) and his wife Dugu Qieluo so that she could continue to wear Buddhist robes and maintain Buddhist precepts, despite an edict from the emperor that even princes and dukes must not harbour monastics.

Yang Jian’s approval of Buddhism, and of Zhixian individually, continued when he was emperor. In 601, he distributed thirty images of Zhixian to reliquary stupas across the land to celebrate the fulfilment of her prophecy. The emperor’s early years in a religious community under the care of Zhixian are accepted as contributing to his commitment to Buddhism, which flourished under his reign.
