= Class 156 =

Class 156 may refer to:

- British Rail Class 156
- Kaidai-type submarine, also known as I-156 class
- Midland Railway 156 Class
