= Midland Railway 700 Class =

Class of 316 British double-framed 0-6-0 locomotives

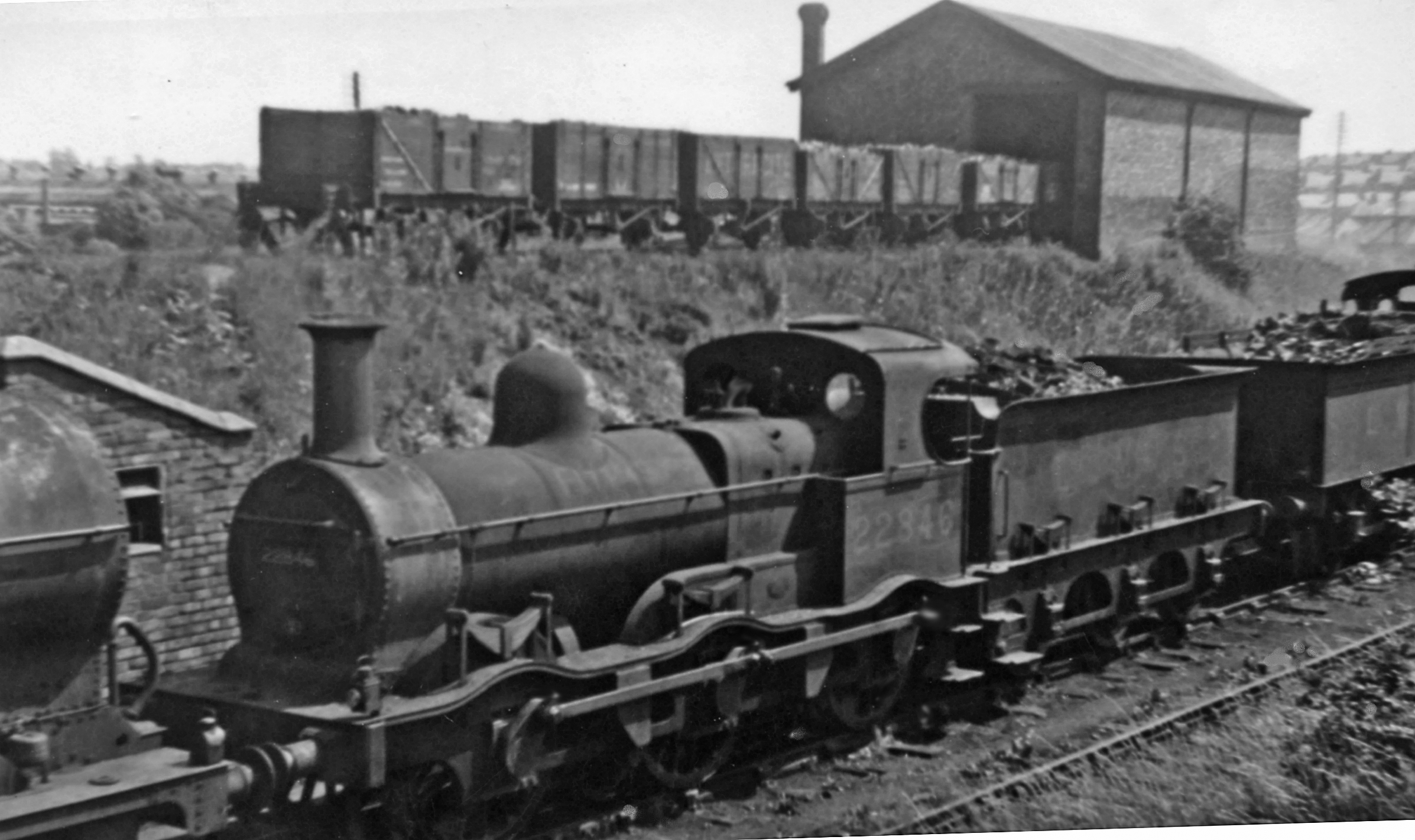
- No. 22846 at Bournville Locomotive Depot 27 July 1947
Type and origin
- Power type: Steam
- Designer: Matthew Kirtley
- Builder: Derby Works (26); Dübs & Co. (150); John Fowler & Co. (10); Kitson & Co. (10); Neilson & Co. (40); Vulcan Foundry (80)
- Build date: 1869–1874
- Total produced: 316
Specifications
- Configuration
  - Whyte: 0-6-0
  - UIC: C n2
- Gauge: 4 ft 8 1/2 in (1,435 mm) standard gauge
- Driver dia.: 5 ft 2 1/2 in (1.588 m)
- Loco weight: 36 long tons 0 cwt (80,600 lb or 36.6 t)
- Fuel type: Coal
- Boiler pressure: 140 lbf/in^{2} (965 kPa)
- Heating surface: 1,100 sq ft (100 m^{2})
- Cylinders: Two, inside
- Cylinder size: 17 in × 24 in (432 mm × 610 mm)
Career
- Operators: MR → LMS → BR; FS
- Class: MR: 700; LMS: 1F; FS: 380
- Power class: 1F
- Withdrawn: 1903 – 1951
- Disposition: All but a single tender scrapped

The Midland Railway 700 Class was a large class of double framed 0-6-0 freight steam locomotives designed by Matthew Kirtley for the Midland Railway. They were in the power classification 1F.

== Early withdrawals ==
Six locomotives - nos. 271/9, 1007/31/52/3 - were withdrawn from service between 1903 and 1905.

Fifty more were sold in 1906 to the Italian State Railway, Ferrovie dello Stato Italiane (FS), where they formed FS Class 380; they had been ordered by one of the constituents of the FS, the Rete Mediterranea. They were meant to fill a gap of usable locomotives after the nationalization of the Italian railways. They were intended to remain in service for a few years; however, some of them remained active into the 1920s.

== Numbering ==
After the Midland Railway's 1907 renumbering scheme, the numbers were:

- 2592–2671, 2674–2711 and 2713–2867

Numbers 2672/3 were members of the 480 Class; no. 2712 was a member of the 240 Class, which had been given a number in the wrong series as the result of a clerk's error.

== Accidents and incidents ==
- On 3 December 1892, locomotive No. 871 was hauling a freight train that crashed at Wymondham Junction, Leicestershire, severely damaging the signal box.

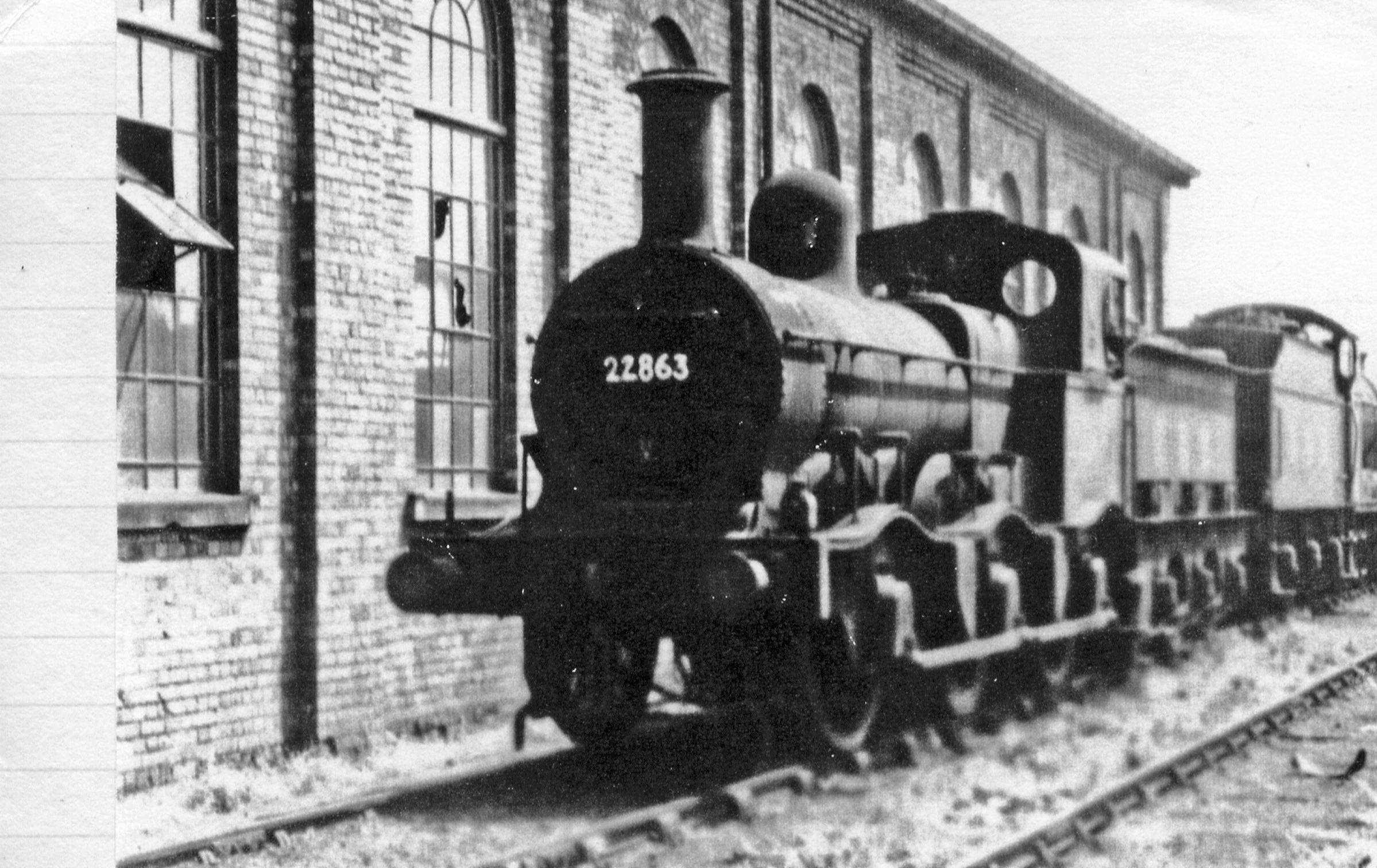
22863 at Bournville Shed, 1947

== Military service ==
78 locomotives of the class were loaned to the War Department during the First World War and were used by the Railway Operating Division of the Royal Engineers for military duties in France. A further three were selected to go but instead were loaned to the London and South Western Railway (LSWR) between December 1917 and February 1920 The locomotives allocated were 2707–11/13–88 of which 2783–85 were sent to the LSWR. The remainder went to France at various dates in 1917 before being returned to the MR in 1919–20. All returned to service with the MR except 2765, which was scrapped at Derby in 1920 after suffering broken frames during its time with the ROD.

One engine, 2717, was cut off in No man's land during the Battle of Cambrai in November 1917 and was subsequently captured by the German army during Operation Michael. The Germans salvaged the engine and used it on their military railway in the Brussels area. Recovered after the war, the engine was returned to the MR.

== Preservation ==
None of the 700 Class locomotives survived into preservation, but a tender from No. 2846 does survive behind preserved 156 Class No. 158A.

== See also ==
- Locomotives of the Midland Railway
