= San Ponziano, Spoleto =

Church building in Spoleto, Italy

Coordinates: 42.7399°N 12.7417°E

San Ponziano is a romanesque-style, Former-Benedictine monastery and church located in Spoleto, Province of Perugia, region of Umbria, Italy. The site is dedicated to St. Ponziano, the patron saint of Spoleto.

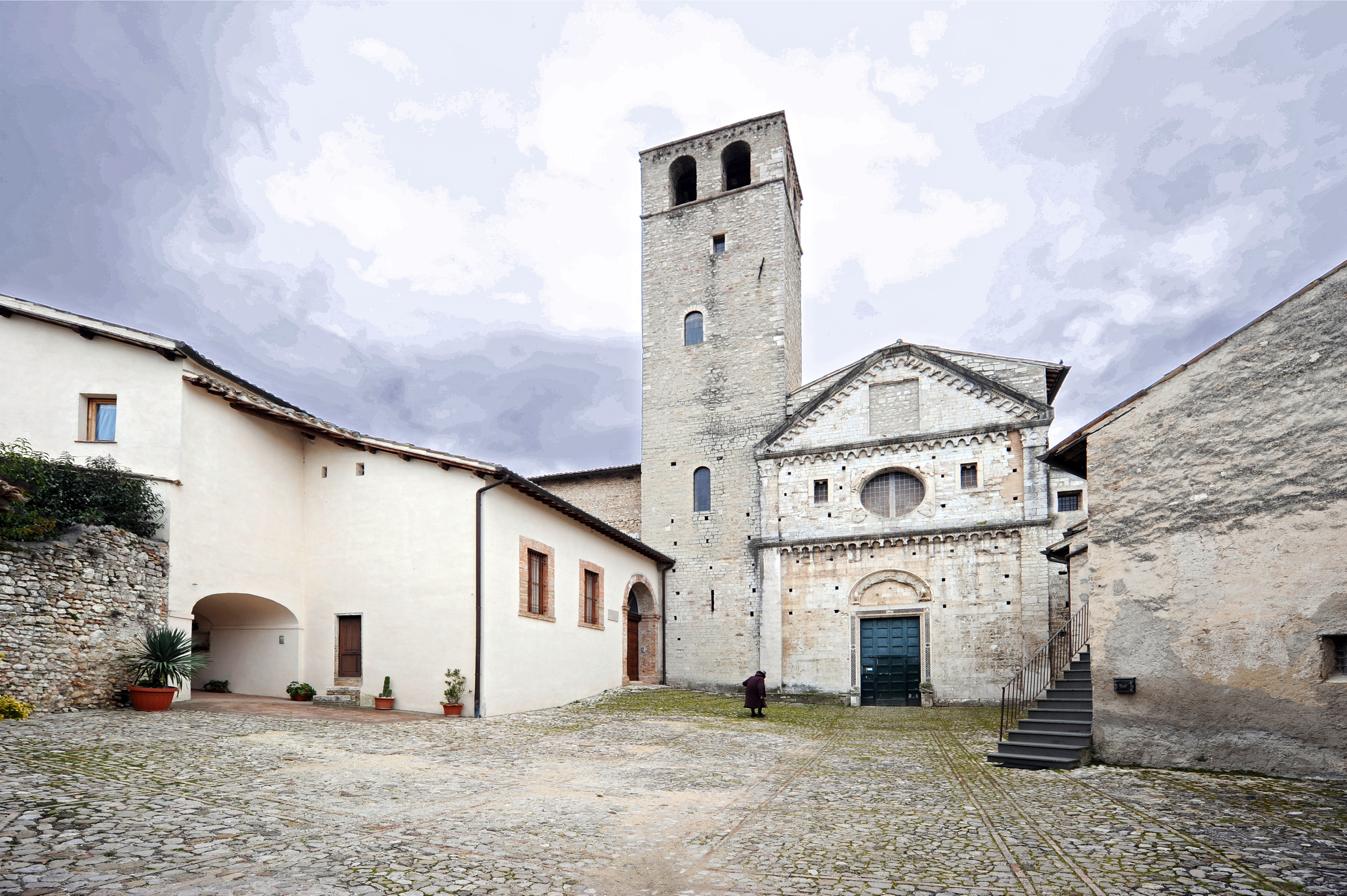
Facade and bell-tower

== History ==
A Benedictine monastery for male monks was present at the site since before the 14th century. The present structure was extensively refurbished in 1788 by Giuseppe Valadier. He retained much of the Romanesque façade, but the interiors have neoclassic decoration. The crypt maintains frescoes from the 14th and 15th centuries; it houses a reliquary with the skull of San Ponziano, which is included in a procession on his feast days. In 1810, the monastery, then housing Benedictine nuns, was suppressed by the Napoleonic government.

Today the basilica and monastery is operated by a community of Canonesses Regular of the Lateran. The canonesses operate the ancient monastery as a religious guesthouse, open to all.
