= Midland Railway 690 Class =

Midland Railway 690 class
Type and origin
- Power type: Steam
- Designer: Matthew Kirtley
- Builder: Beyer, Peacock & Co.
- Serial number: 869–874
- Build date: 1869
- Total produced: 6
Specifications
- Configuration
  - Whyte: 0-4-4T
  - UIC: B2′ n2t
- Gauge: 4 ft 8 1/2 in (1,435 mm)
- Driver dia.: 5 ft 2 in (1.575 m)
- Trailing dia.: 3 ft 0 in (0.914 m)
- Wheelbase
  - Engine: 8 ft 0 in (2.438 m) +; 9 ft 9 in (2.972 m) +; 5 ft 0 in (1.524 m)
- Loco weight: 43 long tons 13 cwt (44.4 t)
- Boiler
  - Diameter: 4 ft 3 in (1.295 m)
  - Tube plates: 11 ft 0 in (3.353 m)
- Heating surface: 1,072.7 sq ft (99.66 m^{2})
- Cylinders: Two
- Cylinder size: 17 in × 24 in (432 mm × 610 mm)
Career
- Operators: Midland Railway; London, Midland and Scottish Railway
- Nicknames: New: 690–695; 1907: 1200–1205
- Withdrawn: 1926–1934

The Midland Railway 690 Class was a class of six 0-4-4T built by Beyer, Peacock and Company in 1869 for use in the London area.

They were double-framed Kirtley engines with a back tank, i.e. the tank was placed beneath the bunker. The 780 Class was similar.

Their original numbers were 690–695. In 1898 they were transferred to the duplicate list as 690A–695A. Their 1907 numbers were 1200–1205. All were inherited by the London, Midland and Scottish Railway in 1923. In 1930 the two remaining, 1201/3 were renumbered 1212/3. The final one was withdrawn in 1934. All were scrapped.

Table of withdrawals
Year	Quantity in service at start of year	Quantity withdrawn	Locomotive numbers	Notes
1926	6	1	1205	
1928	5	3	1200, 1202, 1204	
1930	2	1	1213	
1934	1	1	1212	
