= 162 =

162 may also refer to:

- 162 (number), the natural number following 161 and preceding 163
- AD 162
- 162 BC
- 162 (New Jersey bus)
- UFC 162
- 162 Laurentia
- Heinkel He 162
- Radical 162
