= M. Sattonius Iucundus =

M. Sattonius Iucundus, third century

During an excavation in the Roman Thermae of Heerlen a whinstone was found, pointing to M. Sattonius Iucundus (or Marcus Sattonius, possibly also Marcus Sattonius Jucundus) as the restorer of the Thermae in the 3rd century, the stone explains that he did this as a debt to Fortuna.

At that moment Marcus was decurio in Colonia Ulpia Traiana, what is now known as Xanten.

It is possible that he was the Marcus Sattonius who, around 253, as a centurion of the Third Legion in Algiers, erected a statue of Mars in honour of the legion. If this is true, at least it is speculated, he might have returned home, to his birth grounds in Coriovallum (Heerlen), a rich man after his time in the legion was over. And as a rich citizen he was able to secure a place in the city council of Xanten, the capital of civitas Traianensis, the Roman district to which Coriovallum belonged, which had a council of a hundred big landowners.

Some sources state the restoration took place around 175.
