= Yang clan of Hongnong =

Notable Chinese family

The Yang clan of Hongnong (弘農楊氏) was a prominent Chinese clan known for producing many high-ranking officials and imperial concubines. Their ancestral home was Hongnong Commadery (農楊郡). It is noted that the Yang clan of Hongnong may originate from Yangshe clan (羊舌氏).

The first notable member of this clan was Yang Chang (楊敞), who served as prime minister during the Western Han dynasty. (Note: In the Twenty-Four Histories, Yang Chang was the first member of his clan to receive a biography, in the Book of Han.)

The Hongnong Yang clan tomb in Shaoguan County, Shaanxi Province, has been used for several generations since Yang Zhen.

According to the Book of Sui, Yang Jian, the founding emperor of the Sui dynasty, was born to the Yang clan of Hongnong, and was a descendant of Yang Zhen.

== Notable people ==
=== Males ===
- Yang Chang (楊敞; died 19 September 74 BC) – He served as prime minister during the reign of Emperor Zhao of Han, and was also a son-in-law of Sima Qian. (Note: Yang Chang's biography in Han Shu did not mention that he was a descendant of Yang Xi. One possibility was that the authors did not want to draw attention to the fact that Sima Qian, who greatly admired Xiang Yu, had a son-in-law who is a descendant of someone who had posthumously dismembered Xiang. In Shiji, Xiang Yu's biography was listed under the "annals" section, which is reserved for emperors; another exception which Sima Qian made was for Empress Lü. Also, Sima addressed Xiang by his courtesy name Yu; the Book of Han listed Xiang's biography under the "biographies" section and addressed him by his given name Ji.)
  - Yang Chang's son Yang Yun (楊惲; died c.54 BC (Note: The annals of Emperor Xuan in Book of Han recorded that Yang Yun was executed in the 12th month of the 2nd year of the Wufeng era; the month corresponds to 22 Jan to 19 Feb 55 BC in the proleptic Julian calendar. However, in Zizhi Tongjian Kaoyi, Sima Guang noted that by comparing with other sources, Yang Yun couldn't have been executed in the month stated in the annals of Emperor Xuan; Tongjian itself recorded Yang's death in the 4th year of the Wufeng era, while Sima opinioned in Kaoyi that the 12th month of the 2nd year of the Wufeng era was when Yang Yun was demoted to commoner status.)) helped to disseminate his maternal grandfather's magnum opus: the Shiji.
- Yang Bao (楊寶) – He was a great-grandson of Yang Chang and a scholar of Classic of History during the end of the Western Han dynasty. He lived and taught in seclusion.
- Yang Zhen (楊震; c.50s - c.April 124) – He was the son of Yang Bao, and was an official of the Eastern Han dynasty. (Note: Yang Zhen's biography in Book of the Later Han recorded that he was a 8th generation descendant of Yang Xi (楊喜), who was appointed Marquis of Chiquan during the reign of Emperor Gaozu of Han. The Shiji recorded that Yang Xi was part of the quartet who dismembered Xiang Yu posthumously.)
- Yang Fu (楊敷) – He was a grandson of Yang Zhen and was known for his good personal qualities.
- Yang Fu (楊馥)– He was a grandson of Yang Zhen. He was appointed as a Gentlemen Cadet and become the Commander of the Guards.
- Yang Ci (楊賜; died c.November 185) – He was a grandson of Yang Zhen (楊震), and a tutor to Emperor Ling. He became Minister Steward and Minister of the Household. From March to c.August 173, Yang Ci was appointed as Excellency of the Works and from c.January 177 to 4 February 178, he became Excellency of the Masses. (Note: According to Emperor Ling's biography in Book of the Later Han, Yang Ci was made Sikong on the ren'wu day of the 2nd month of the 2nd year of the Xiping era (4 Mar 173 in the Julian calendar), and relieved of the position in the 7th month of that year (28 Jul to 25 Aug). He was then made Situ on the bing'xu day of the 11th month of the 5th year of the Xi'ping era (likely an error as there was no bingxu day in that month; the month corresponds to 19 Dec 176 to 17 Jan 177 in the Julian calendar) and relieved of the position on the geng'chen day of the 12th month of the 6th year of the same era (4 Feb 178).)
- Yang Biao (楊彪; 142-225) – He was a son of Yang Ci (禓賜) and a scholar of the Han dynasty. He became a consultant and joined the group of scholars who were ordered to prepare a fourth installment of the Record of Han.
- Yang Xiu (楊修) – He was the son of Yang Biao (楊彪) and an official and adviser serving under the warlord Cao Cao. He also served as registrar of the imperial chancellor (丞相主簿).
- Yang Su (楊素) – He was a military strategist during the Sui dynasty. He held the title of Duke of Chu (楚国公). He was posthumously honoured as Duke Jingwu of Chu (楚景武国公).
- Yang Yuqing (楊虞卿) – He was a close associate of Emperor Wenzong of Tang and the mayor of Jingzhao Municipality.

=== Females ===
==== Imperial Consorts ====
Imperial Consort	Emperor	Sons	Daughters
Empress Wuyuan	Emperor Wu of Jin	1. Sima Gui, Prince Dao of Piling; 2. Emperor Xiaohui; 3. Sima Jian, Prince Xian of Qin	1. Princess Pingyang; 2. Princess Xinfeng (新豐公主); 3. Princess Yangping
Empress Wudao	Emperor Wu of Jin	1. Sima Hui, Prince Shang of Bohai	
Imperial Concubine Yang	Emperor Gaozu of Tang	26. Li Yuanxiang, Prince Jiang'an	
Princess consort	Emperor Taizong of Tang	14. Li Ming, Prince Gong of Cao	
Empress Yuanxian	Emperor Xuanzong of Tang	3. Emperor Suzong of Tang	8. Princess Qi
Noble Consort Yang	Emperor Xuanzong of Tang and Li Miao		
Worthy Consort Yang	Emperor Muzong of Tang	8. Li Rong, Prince An	
Worthy Consort Yang	Emperor Wenzong of Tang		
Empress Yang (Alleged)	Emperor Ningzong of Song dynasty	1. Zhao Zeng (prince); 2. Zhao Jiong (prince); 3. Zhao Xun (crown prince) adopted 4. Zhao Hong (crown prince) adopted 5. Zhao Yun (Emperor Lizong) adopted	

=== Others ===
- Lady Yang, daughter of Yang Kan, Duke of Jibei (济北国公 杨侃) and wife of Wei Xiaokuan
- Princess Consort of Chao (巢王妃 弘農楊氏), (Note: married Li Shiming after Li Yuanji's death and had a son) niece of Yang Gongren and wife of Li Yuanji
- Princess Consort of Wu (吳王妃弘農楊氏), wife of Li Ke, Prince of Yuling
- Crown Princess Yang (杨太子妃), wife of Li Chongjun, Crown Prince Jiemin

== Sources ==
- Vol.33 of Book of Sui (隋书·卷三十三·志第二十八：《杨氏血脉谱》二卷)
- Vol.204 of History of Song (宋史·卷二百四·志第一百五十七：杨侃《家谱》一卷)
- Ancient and Early Medieval Chinese Literature (vol. 3 & 4): A Reference Guide, Part Three & Four. Brill. 2014. p. 1847. ISBN 978-9004271852.
