= Midland Railway 156 Class =

Class of 29 British 2-4-0 locomotives

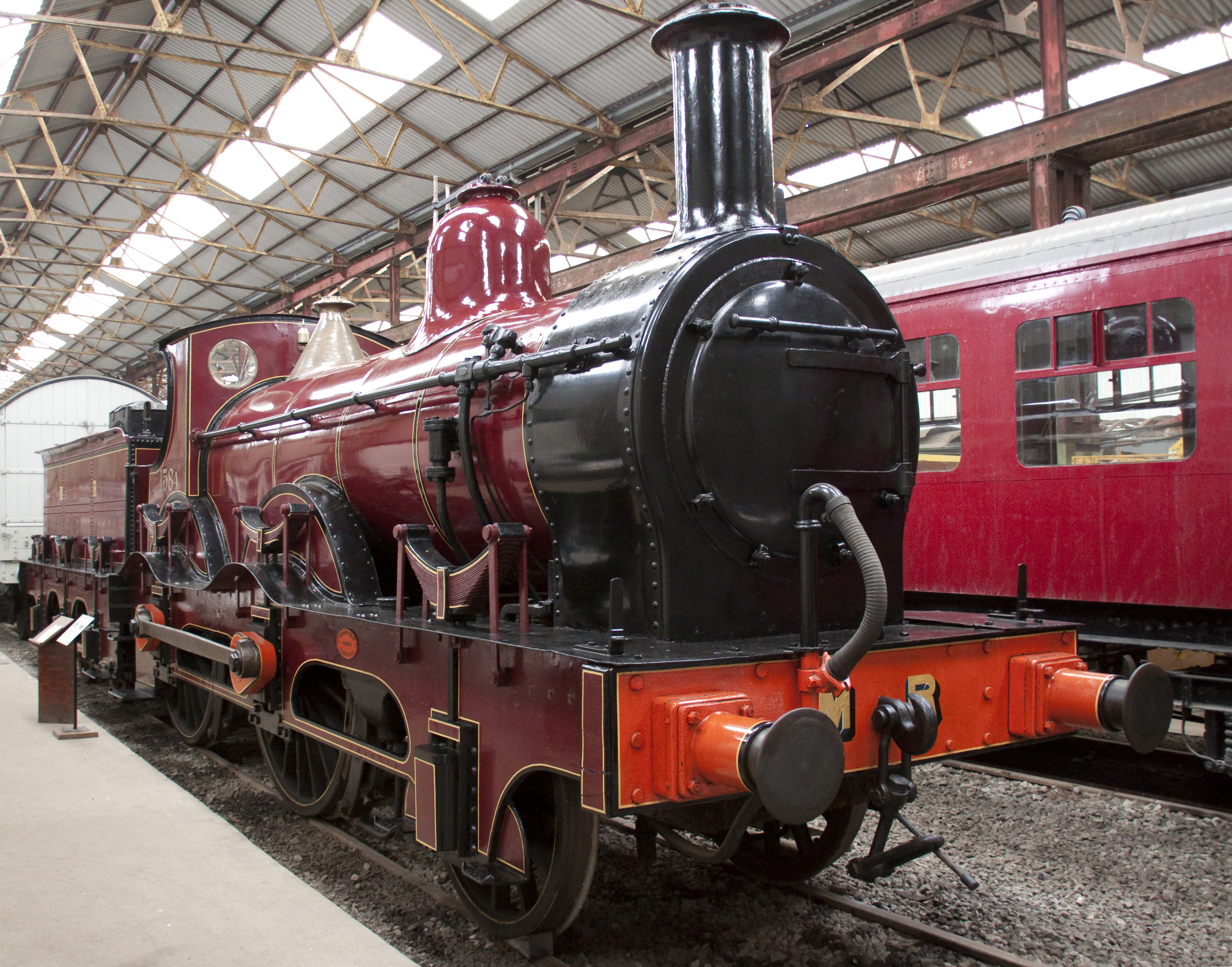
- MR 158A, the oldest surviving Midland Railway locomotive
Type and origin
- Power type: Steam
- Designer: Matthew Kirtley (rebuilt by Samuel W. Johnson)
- Builder: Derby Works
- Build date: 1866–1874
- Total produced: 29
Specifications
- Configuration
  - Whyte: 2-4-0
  - UIC: 1B n
- Gauge: 4 ft 8 1/2 in (1,435 mm) standard gauge
- Driver dia.: 6 ft 2.5 in (1.892 m)
- Loco weight: 41 long tons 5 cwt (92,400 lb or 41.9 t)
- Fuel type: Coal
- Water cap.: 2,000 imp gal (9,100 L; 2,400 US gal)
- Boiler pressure: 140 psi (0.97 MPa)
- Cylinders: Two, inside
Performance figures
- Tractive effort: 12,340 lbf (54.89 kN)
Career
- Withdrawn: 1890s - 1947
- Disposition: One preserved, remainder scrapped

The Midland Railway 156 Class was a class of 2-4-0 tender engines built at Derby Works between 1866 and 1874. In total 29 of the class were built under the Midland Railway. They were rebuilt sometime between 1873 and 1903.

== History ==
These engines were used on express passenger trains to London King's Cross railway station, which was then the Midland Railway's terminus there. 21 survived to become part of the London, Midland and Scottish Railway (LMS) fleet of engines in 1923. By then they were reduced to the humblest of roles. In September 1930, the LMS recognised the significance of the class and number 156 itself was ear-marked for preservation. However, William Stanier chose not to preserve it and the engine was scrapped two years later.

== Preservation ==
One engine, 158A (originally built as 158 before subsequently renumbered, becoming Midland Railway No. 2 in 1907 and finally 20002 by the LMS in 1934) survives. It was withdrawn from service in July 1947 as a station pilot at Nottingham station by the LMS and restored to Midland condition and original number. It was a static exhibit in Birmingham during the centenary celebrations at the New Street station in 1954.

The locomotive was preserved at Derby Works until being moved to the National Railway Museum. It was placed on loan to the Midland Railway – Butterley in Derbyshire in 1975 and remained on display there until 2021. Following cosmetic attention at the Locomotion Museum in Shildon, the locomotive was placed on a three-year loan to Barrow Hill Engine Shed from August 2022. The surviving example is not in as built condition, being reboilered twice and having the front end rebuilt, and the current tender being taken from scrapped 700 Class No. 2846.
