= NH 156 =

NH 156 may refer to:

- National Highway 156 (India)
- New Hampshire Route 156, United States
