= AD 162 =

162 in various calendars
- Gregorian calendar: 162; CLXII
- Ab urbe condita: 915
- Assyrian calendar: 4912
- Balinese saka calendar: 83–84
- Bengali calendar: −432 – −431
- Berber calendar: 1112
- Buddhist calendar: 706
- Burmese calendar: −476
- Byzantine calendar: 5670–5671
- Chinese calendar: 辛丑年 (Metal Ox); 2859 or 2652 — to — 壬寅年 (Water Tiger); 2860 or 2653
- Coptic calendar: −122 – −121
- Discordian calendar: 1328
- Ethiopian calendar: 154–155
- Hebrew calendar: 3922–3923
- Hindu calendars
- Vikram Samvat: 218–219
- Shaka Samvat: 83–84
- Kali Yuga: 3262–3263
- Holocene calendar: 10162
- Iranian calendar: 460 BP – 459 BP
- Islamic calendar: 474 BH – 473 BH
- Javanese calendar: 38–39
- Julian calendar: 162; CLXII
- Korean calendar: 2495
- Minguo calendar: 1750 before ROC 民前1750年
- Nanakshahi calendar: −1306
- Seleucid era: 473/474 AG
- Thai solar calendar: 704–705
- Tibetan calendar: ལྕགས་མོ་གླང་ལོ་ (female Iron-Ox); 288 or −93 or −865 — to — ཆུ་ཕོ་སྟག་ལོ་ (male Water-Tiger); 289 or −92 or −864

Year 162 (CLXII) was a common year starting on Thursday of the Julian calendar. In the Roman Empire, it was known as the Year of the Consulship of Rusticus and Plautius (or, less frequently, year 915 Ab urbe condita).

The denomination 162 AD for this year has been used since the early medieval period, when the Anno Domini calendar era became the prevalent method in Europe for naming years.

== Events ==
=== By place ===
==== Roman Empire ====
- Lucius Verus begins a war with the Parthians, due to the invasion of Syria and Armenia by King Vologases IV of Parthia.

=== By topic ===
==== Art and Science ====
- Arrian, Greek historian and writer, publishes Indica, a work on India and its people.

== Births ==
- Marcus Annius Verus Caesar, one of Roman emperor Marcus Aurelius's thirteen children (d. 169)

== Deaths ==
- Marcus Annius Libo, the second child and first son to Roman consul Marcus Annius Verus and Rupilia Faustina
