= AD 130 =

130 in various calendars
- Gregorian calendar: 130; CXXX
- Ab urbe condita: 883
- Assyrian calendar: 4880
- Balinese saka calendar: 51–52
- Bengali calendar: −464 – −463
- Berber calendar: 1080
- Buddhist calendar: 674
- Burmese calendar: −508
- Byzantine calendar: 5638–5639
- Chinese calendar: 己巳年 (Earth Snake); 2827 or 2620 — to — 庚午年 (Metal Horse); 2828 or 2621
- Coptic calendar: −154 – −153
- Discordian calendar: 1296
- Ethiopian calendar: 122–123
- Hebrew calendar: 3890–3891
- Hindu calendars
- Vikram Samvat: 186–187
- Shaka Samvat: 51–52
- Kali Yuga: 3230–3231
- Holocene calendar: 10130
- Iranian calendar: 492 BP – 491 BP
- Islamic calendar: 507 BH – 506 BH
- Javanese calendar: 5–6
- Julian calendar: 130; CXXX
- Korean calendar: 2463
- Minguo calendar: 1782 before ROC 民前1782年
- Nanakshahi calendar: −1338
- Seleucid era: 441/442 AG
- Thai solar calendar: 672–673
- Tibetan calendar: ས་མོ་སྦྲུལ་ལོ་ (female Earth-Snake); 256 or −125 or −897 — to — ལྕགས་ཕོ་རྟ་ལོ་ (male Iron-Horse); 257 or −124 or −896

Year 130 (CXXX) was a common year starting on Saturday of the Julian calendar. At the time, it was known as the Year of the Consulship of Catullinus and Aper (or, less frequently, year 883 Ab urbe condita). The denomination 130 for this year has been used since the early medieval period, when the Anno Domini calendar era became the prevalent method in Europe for naming years.

== Events ==
=== By place ===
==== Roman Empire ====
- A law is passed in Rome banning the execution of slaves without a trial.
- The Temple of Olympian Zeus is completed at Athens.
- Emperor Hadrian visits the cities Petra and Gerasa (Jerash).
- A Triumphal Arch for Hadrian is built in Gerasa.
- Construction begins on Canopus, Hadrian's Villa, Tivoli, Italy.

==== Asia ====
- Huviska becomes king of the Kushan Empire in India.
- The Scythian king Rudradaman I reconquers the lands annexed by Gautamiputra from the Andhra.

=== By topic ===
==== Arts and sciences ====
- Claudius Ptolemaeus tabulates angles of refraction for several media.
- The Antinous Mondragone is sculpted.
- c. 130–138 – Hadrian Hunting Boar and Sacrificing to Apollo, sculptural reliefs on the Arch of Constantine, Rome, are made.
- c. 130–138 – Antinous, from Hadrian's Villa at Tivoli, Italy, is made. It is now kept at Museo Gregoriano Egizio, Rome.

== Births ==
- December 15 – Lucius Verus, Roman emperor (d. 169)
- Avidius Cassius, Roman general and usurper (d. 175)
- Faustina the Younger, Roman empress
- Irenaeus, Greek bishop and saint (d. 202)

== Deaths ==
- October 30 – Antinous, lover of Hadrian (b. 111)
- Carpocrates, religious philosopher
- Juvenal, Roman poet and satirist
- Marinus of Tyre, Greek cartographer
- Publius Juventius Celsus, Roman jurist (b. AD 67)
- Emperor Keikō of Japan, according to legend.
