= Lectionary 156 =

Lectionary ℓ 156
- New Testament manuscript
- Text: Apostolarion
- Date: 10th century
- Script: Greek
- Now at: Bibliothèque nationale de France
- Size: 24.2 by 19.1 cm

Lectionary 156, designated by siglum ℓ 156 (in the Gregory-Aland numbering) is a Greek manuscript of the New Testament, on parchment leaves. Paleographically it has been assigned to the 10th century.

== Description ==
The codex contains Lessons from the Acts and Epistles lectionary (Apostolarion). It is written in Greek minuscule letters, on 271 parchment leaves (24.2 cm by 18.1 cm), in two columns per page, 22 lines per page. It contains music notes.

10 leaves on the beginning were supplied on paper in the 16th century.

== History ==
The manuscript once was a part of Colbert's collection. Gregory assigned it by 33^{a}. It was examined by Paulin Martin.

The manuscript is not cited in the critical editions of the Greek New Testament (UBS3), but it was used for the Editio Critica Maior.

Currently the codex is located in the Bibliothèque nationale de France (Gr. 382) at Paris.

== See also ==
- List of New Testament lectionaries
- Biblical manuscript
- Textual criticism
