= Yang Xiu (Han dynasty) =

Official and adviser serving warlord Cao Cao (175-219)

- 楊修
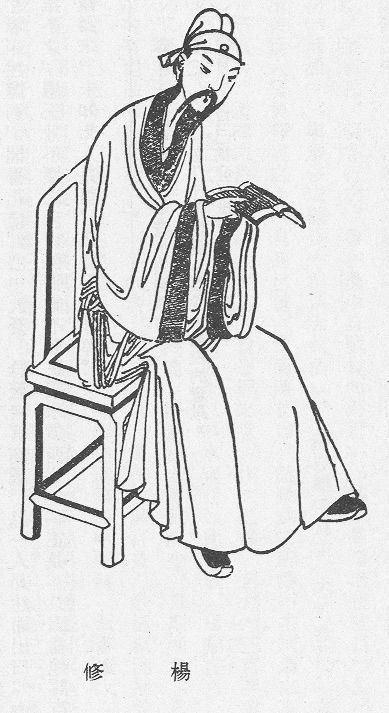
- A Qing dynasty illustration of Yang Xiu

Registrar of the Imperial Chancellor (丞相主簿)
- In office ? – 219
- Monarch: Emperor Xian of Han
- Chancellor: Cao Cao

Personal details
- Born: 175 Huayin, Shaanxi
- Died: August 219 (aged 44) Hanzhong, Shaanxi
- Children: Yang Xiao
- Parents: Yang Biao (father); Yuan Shu's sister (mother)
- Occupation: Official, adviser
- Courtesy name: Dezu (德祖)

Yang Xiu (175 (Note: A Continuation of the Book of Han annotation in Yang Xiu's biography in Book of the Later Han indicated that he was 45 (by East Asian reckoning) when he died.) – 219 (Note: A Dianlüè annotation in Cao Zhi's biography in Sanguozhi indicated that Yang Xiu was killed in the autumn (7th to 9th month) of the 24th year of the Jian'an era. The period corresponds to 30 Jul to 25 Oct 219 in the Julian calendar.)), (Note: Rafe de Crespigny places a question mark after Yang Xiu's year of birth in his A biographical dictionary of Later Han to the Three Kingdoms (23–220 AD).) courtesy name Dezu, was an official and adviser serving under the warlord Cao Cao during the late Eastern Han dynasty of China.

== Life ==
Yang Xiu was a son of Yang Biao (楊彪) and a grandson of Yang Ci (楊賜); Yang Ci was a son of Yang Bing (楊秉), son of Yang Zhen (楊震) of the Yang clan of Hongnong. His mother, Lady Yuan (袁氏), was Yuan Shu's sister.

Sometime during the 200s, Yang Xiu was nominated as xiaolian and became a Registrar (主簿) under Cao Cao, the Imperial Chancellor. He was said to have been skilled in both civil and military affairs and understood Cao Cao well. Because of this, Yang Xiu became an influential figure in the government.

Yang Xiu was a close friend of Cao Cao's son, Cao Zhi, and became involved in the succession struggle between Cao Zhi and his brother Cao Pi. Yang Xiu's close links with Cao Zhi caused him misfortune during Cao Zhi's occasional misbehaviour such as the incident in Ye city, where Cao Zhi drunkenly rode through the gate reserved for only the emperor. But the final blow was when Yang Xiu was accused of insulting Cao Zhang. Because of this and remembering his connection with Yuan Shu, Cao Cao had Yang Xiu executed.

However Cao Pi personally did not dislike Yang Xiu. Cao Pi's favourite sword was a gift from Yang Xiu and Cao Pi regularly kept the sword by his side. Later, after becoming the emperor, Cao Pi remembered that Yang Xiu once said that the sword originally belong to Wang Mao (王髦). A nostalgic Cao Pi then searched for Wang Mao's whereabouts and awarded Wang with food and clothes.

Yang Xiu's death was commonly related to the story of "chicken ribs", which was mentioned in Pei Songzhi's annotation of the Sanguozhi, and was popularized by the novel Romance of the Three Kingdoms. It was thought that the true reason for Xiu's death was not really because of his relationship with Cao Zhi, but because he correctly guessed Cao Cao's inner thoughts, which was taboo, and carelessly revealed these thoughts to other people, which was even more forbidden. People like Cao Cao always wanted to mystify themselves and have political secrets which could not be arbitrarily shared with anyone. Hence, subordinates like Yang Xiu were considered an imminent threat.

Prior to Yang Xiu's death, Cao Cao had written a letter to his father Yang Biao, reproaching him for his son's arrogance. After news of his execution, Yang Biao was struck by grief and self-blame, becoming gray-haired and thin. Upon hearing this, Cao Cao sent Yang Biao many gifts to compensate for the loss of his son.

== Anecdotes ==
A New Account of the Tales of the World recorded the following anecdotes involving Yang Xiu.

Once, a garden door was built by some servants of Cao Cao. When he arrived, he did not talk to his servants about their work but instead wrote a character, "活", meaning "alive", on the door. Nobody could understand what Cao Cao meant by this, except Yang Xiu, who explained that, since, in Chinese, "門" means door, writing the character 活 inside a door forms the character "闊", which means "wide". Thus, Cao Cao was indicating that he thought the door was too wide. The servants of Cao Cao then altered the garden door; when Cao Cao heard that it was Yang Xiu alone who had understood his meaning, he was alerted of Yang's talent.

Once, a nomadic tribe sent a box of cake to Cao Cao as a gift, who wrote the words "一合酥" on the box, which in English, means "a box of cake". But the word ”合” was meant to be written as “盒” However, when Yang Xiu saw it, he took out a spoon and shared the cake with the other followers of Cao Cao. Cao Cao, mystified, asked why, to which he replied, "My lord, you wrote the words 'A mouthful of cake for every person' on the box. How can we disobey your orders?" Since, in Chinese, the words "一合酥" can be separated into "一人一口酥", which translates thus. Cao Cao then became really angry with Yang Xiu.

Another time, Cao Cao and Yang Xiu were riding on their horses and passed by the grave of Cao E (no relation to Cao Cao). On the gravestone were four sets of words, "huang juan (yellow silk fabric), you fu (young woman), wai sun (grandson), and ji jiu (powdering mortar)" (黃絹、幼婦、外孫、齏臼). Cao Cao then asked Yang Xiu if he knew what those four sets of words meant, and Yang Xiu immediately gave an answer. However, Cao Cao interrupted him and told him to wait until he has obtained the answer and then they can compare. After riding for another 30 li (approximately 15 km), Cao Cao finally understood the hidden meaning behind those words and asked Yang Xiu to share his insights and see if he got it correct. Yang Xiu then explained that "huang juan (黃絹) is a synonym for se si (色絲)' (which meant "coloured silk"). If you combine the character si (絲; silk)' with se (色; colour), you get jue (絕; absolute). You fu (幼婦) is a synonym for shao nü (少女; young woman). If you combine the character nü (女; woman) with shao (少; young), you get miao (妙; wonderful). Wai sun (外孫) is equivalent to nü er de er zi (女兒的兒子; "daughter's son"), if you combine take the two major characters out and combine nü (女; "daughter") with zi (子; son), you get hao (好; good). Ji jiu (齏臼) is basically shou wu xin zhi qi (受五辛之器; a device which receives and grinds the five Chinese spices). If you take the two major characters out and combine shou (受; "takes, receives") with xin (辛; spice), you get ci (辤/辭; refined). Combine the four characters and you get jue miao hao ci (絕妙好辭; "absolute, wonderful, good, refined"), which were used to praise Cao E." This greatly impressed Cao Cao, who exclaimed to Yang Xiu: "Your talent surpasses mine, by an astounding distance of 30 li."

== In Romance of the Three Kingdoms ==
In the 14th-century historical novel Romance of the Three Kingdoms, Cao Cao thinks that Yang Xiu is too boastful and overconfident in his cleverness, and eventually kills him after what is known as the "chicken rib" incident.

At the time, Cao Cao's army was fighting against Liu Bei during the famous Hanzhong campaign. The battle had been going unfavorably for Cao Cao and he planned to retreat, but did not openly admit this. One evening, when a messenger asked him for that night's verbal passcode, Cao Cao saw some chicken ribs in his soup and thoughtlessly answered "chicken rib." Yang Xiu interpreted Cao Cao's message as a metaphor for "retreat" and instructed all generals to have their soldiers pack their bags and break camp. Yang Xiu's logic was thus: chicken ribs are inedible, but not completely worthless, similar to the difficult situation that Cao Cao was facing. When Cao Cao was alerted of Yang Xiu's action, he was enraged and executed Yang Xiu.

Later on, as the battle turned even more against him, Cao Cao finally ordered a retreat. Remembering Xiu's prediction, Cao Cao had his subordinate's body collected and gave him a proper funeral.

In an earlier chapter, Yang Xiu was described by Mi Heng as one of the two sole "talented" officials under Cao Cao (the other being Kong Rong). However, this should be taken with a grain of salt, as Mi Heng's other opinions, actions, and ultimate fate suggest he is a poor judge of character.

== See also ==
- Lists of people of the Three Kingdoms
