= Pontianus of Spoleto =

Italian Roman Catholic saint

Saint Pontianus
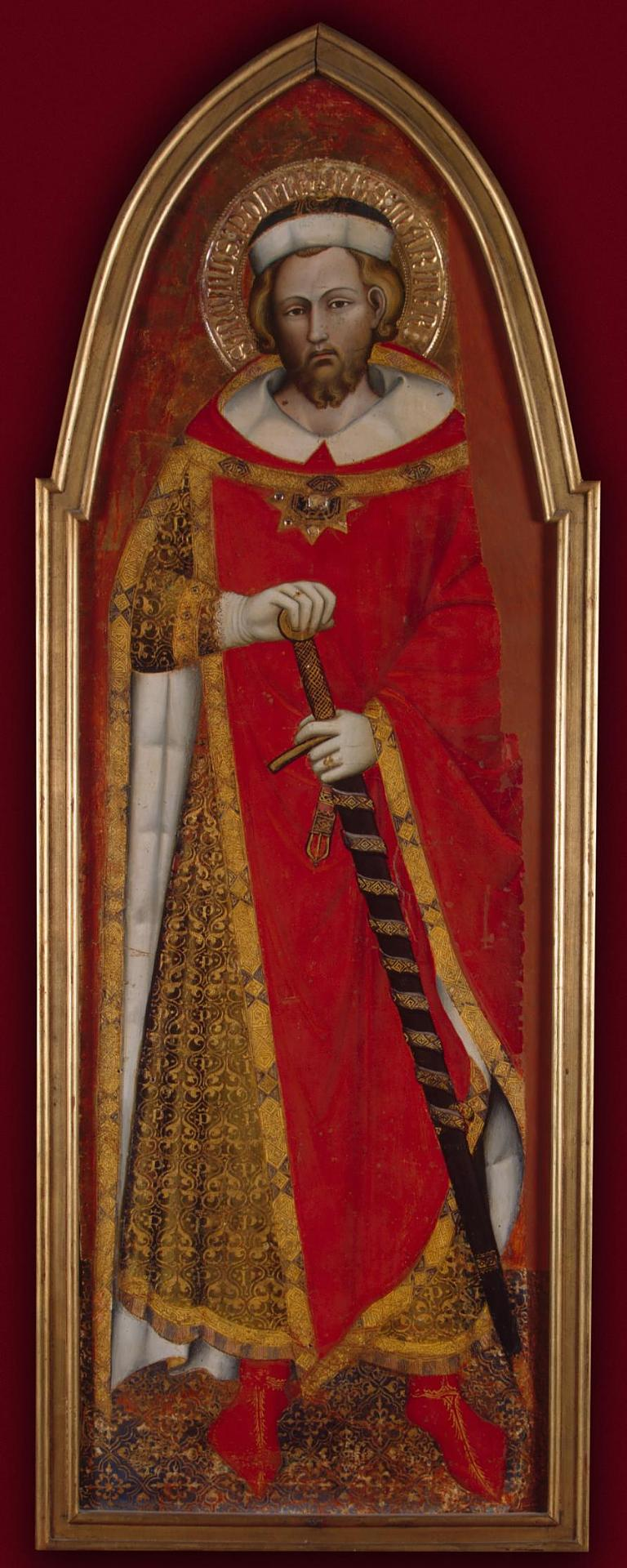
- A painting of Saint Pontianus by Spinello Aretino Ca. 1383-1384

Martyr
- Born: c. 156
- Died: 14 January 175; Spoleto, Italy, Roman Empire
- Venerated in: Roman Catholic Church (Spoleto, Italy; and Utrecht and Marssum, the Netherlands); Old Catholic Church; Eastern Orthodox Church
- Canonized: pre-congregation
- Major shrine: Basilica of San Ponziano, Spoleto, Italy
- Feast: 19 January (14 January in Spoleto)
- Attributes: young man holding a sword
- Patronage: Spoleto, Italy, and Utrecht and Marssum, the Netherlands

Pontianus (Latin: Pontianus, Italian: Ponziano) (alternatively anglicized as Pontian) was a second century Christian martyr. He was martyred during the reign of the Emperor Marcus Aurelius. He is honored as a saint and martyr by the Catholic Church, the Old Catholic Church, and the Eastern Orthodox Church. In Spoleto, Italy, he is invoked for protection against earthquakes. He is patron saint of the Frisian village Marssum.

== Life ==
According to a Passio preserved in the Cathedral of Spoleto, Pontianus was a young man from a local noble family of Spoleto, 18 years of age, who had been denounced as a Christian to the Roman authorities. Brought before a judge named Flavian, he chose torture and death rather than renounce his faith. He was condemned to death and beheaded on 14 January 175.

== Veneration ==
=== Basilica of San Ponziano ===
Pontianus' body was buried in the local cemetery, called di Sincleta, outside the city walls. The Basilica of San Ponziano was eventually built over his grave as a shrine to his memory. He has become the patron saint of that city. A monastery was built attached to the basilica for a community of Benedictine monks to administer it. Over the centuries, the monks were replaced by nuns of the same order. The monastery was suppressed in 1810 during the occupation of Italy by Napoleonic forces.

Every year a festival is held in the city to honor Pontianus, its patron. Various services are held starting on the eve of the feast, which culminate in a procession through the streets of the city. Pontianus' skull, preserved in the basilica, is processed for veneration by the people of the city.

Today the complex of basilica and monastery is operated by a community of Canonesses Regular of the Lateran. The canonesses operate the ancient monastery as a religious guesthouse, open to all.

=== Patron saint of Utrecht ===
Devotion to Pontianus grew throughout the region. In 966, Bishop Balderic of Utrecht travelled to Rome to present an account of his administration, as required by Church law. He took the opportunity to tour various churches and monasteries, from which he obtained numerous relics of the saints for the churches of his diocese. In the course of this journey, he obtained one of Pontianus' arms, which he had enshrined in his cathedral. As a result, Pontianus was named a co-patron of the diocese.

At the time that the Protestant Reformation took hold in Utrecht, Calvinist mobs attacked the Catholic cathedral there. Members of the Old Catholic Church, headquartered in that city, sought to protect his relics, which they were given and then preserved.

In 1994 the Primate of the Old Catholic Church returned this relic in a solemn manner to the abbess of the monastery which administers the basilica.

=== Protection against earthquakes ===
In Spoleto, Pontianus is invoked for protection against earthquakes. This developed from an ancient tradition that, before his death, the young martyr had predicted that "Spoleto will shake but not will collapse".

In 1703, the first of a series of devastating earthquakes occurred on his feast day. It affected the entire region of Italy, lasting nearly three weeks. While thousands of people died as a result, there were no deaths in Spoleto.

=== Artwork ===
Pontianus is one of the 140 saints whose statues adorn St. Peter's Square on top of Bernini's colonnades.
