= Decurio =

Official title in Ancient Rome

Decurio was an official title in Ancient Rome, used in various connections:

- Decurion (administrative), a member of the senatorial order in the Italian towns under the administration of Rome, and later in provincial towns organized on the Italian model. The number of decuriones varied in different towns, but was usually 100. The qualifications for the office were fixed in each town by a special law for that community (lex municipalis). Cicero (in Verr. 2. 49, 120) alludes to an age limit (originally thirty years, until lowered by Augustus to twenty-five), to a property qualification (cf. Pliny, Ep. i. 19. 2), and to certain conditions of rank. The method of appointment varied in different towns and at different periods. In the early municipal constitution ex-magistrates passed automatically into the Senate of their town; but at a later date this order was reversed and membership of the Senate became a qualification for the magistracy. Cicero (loc. cit.) speaks of the Senate in the Sicilian towns as appointed by a vote of the township. But in most towns it was the duty of the chief magistrate to draw up a list (album) of the senators every five years. The decuriones held office for life. They were convened by the magistrate, who presided as in the Roman Senate. Their powers were extensive. In all matters the magistrates were obliged to act according to their direction, and in some towns they heard cases of appeal against judicial sentences passed by the magistrate. By the time of the municipal law of Julius Caesar (45 BC) special privileges were conferred on the decuriones, including the right to appeal to Rome for trial in criminal cases. Under the principate their status underwent a marked decline. The office was no longer coveted, and documents of the 3rd and 4th centuries show that means were devised to compel members of the towns to undertake it. By the time of the jurists it had become hereditary and compulsory. This change was largely due to the heavy financial burdens which the Roman government laid on the municipal senates.
- The leader of a decuria, a subdivision of the curia.
- Decurion, an officer in the Roman cavalry, originally commanding a troop of ten men (decuria) during the early republican era. In the late republic and during the empire a decurio commanded a turma of 32 men in the auxiliary cavalry. It is the equivalent of the ancient Greek dekarchos, a cavalry officer.
- Decurio was also a name given to certain priests intended, as it should seem, for some particular sacrifices, or other religious ceremonies; or for the sacrifices of private families and houses, as Burkhard Gotthelf Struve (1671-1738) conjectures, who from that source derives their name. Whatever the origin of the name, we have an inscription in Gruter's work, which confirms their function: ANCHIALVS. CVB. AED. Q. TER. IN. AEDE. DECVRIO. ADLECTVS. EX. CONSENSV. DECVRIONVM. FAMILIAE. VOLVNTATE., which describes a decurio in the house of a private person, Q. Terentius.
