= Locomotives of the Midland Railway =

Locomotives of pre-1923 British railway

The Locomotives of the Midland Railway (which it always referred to as engines), followed its small engine policy. The policy was later adopted by the London, Midland and Scottish Railway, and contrasted with the London and North Western Railway's policy. The small engine policy was partly the consequence of a difference in the background of senior managers. In most railway companies, the elite position was the design, construction and maintenance of locomotives. Bigger engines brought more prestige and allowed longer trains. In the Midland, the marketing department was paramount. They recognised that people wanted more frequent, shorter trains rather than an infrequent service. It concentrated on very light, very fast and frequent trains.

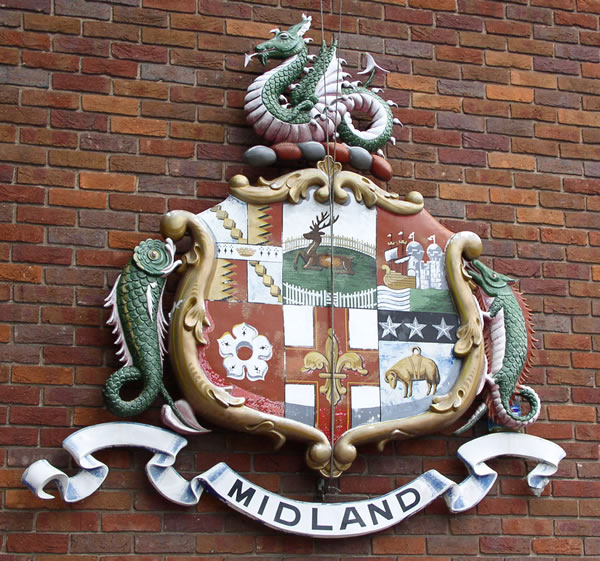
Midland Railway Coat of Arms

== Overview ==
The small engine policy was, perhaps, carried on too long, giving rise to the derisive poem:

M is for Midland with engines galore
Two on each train and asking for more

Prior to around 1900, the Midland's locomotives were not noticeably different in size or power to those of other British railway companies; what was more notable was the company's commitment to standardisation of a small number of related locomotive designs. This policy began in the 1850s with Matthew Kirtley as Chief Mechanical Engineer. Kirtley provided two basic engine types - 0-6-0 locomotives for freight and 2-4-0 types for passenger work. Over 800 Kirtley 0-6-0s and 150 2-4-0s were built up to 1873. Samuel W. Johnson and Richard Deeley continued the policy but with a gradual progression in the locomotive designs. By 1914 the entire Midland network was being operated by six basic engine designs: a Class 1 0-6-0 tank engine for light freight and shunting, Class 1 0-4-4T tank engine for light passenger work, Class 2 4-4-0 engine for general passenger work, Class 3 0-6-0 engines in tank and tender variants for mixed traffic and freight, and Class 4 4-4-0 for express passenger work. This degree of standardisation was exceptional amongst the pre-grouping British railway companies. All the Midland designs were built to the same basic design principles and a 'kit' of parts meaning that many parts such as boilers, cylinders, wheels, cabs and bearings were interchangeable across some or all of the six types.

During the 1890s, a new phase in British locomotive development began with the arrival of 'large engine' designs to cope with rising average train weights for both passenger and freight traffic and demand for faster journey times. This new generation of engines featured much larger, more efficient boilers and were physically larger, heavier and more powerful than the locomotives commonly built in the preceding 40 years. During the 1900s, many British railways began introducing new locomotive designs, with the 4-6-0 becoming predominant for express passenger work, the 0-8-0 for heavy freight trains and the 2-6-0 for fast freight and mixed traffic. Unusually amongst the large British railways, the Midland chose not to develop its own 'large engines' - when such designs were proposed by both Johnson and Deeley, they were rejected by the railway's management. Instead the Midland chose to continue production of its existing locomotive designs largely unchanged and thus adopted the 'small engine policy' for the 20th century.

=== Origins of the Small Engine Policy ===
The Midland was fortunate in that George Stephenson had built its main lines with very shallow gradients, while its main rival, the LNWR had to cope with the hilly country north of Lancaster. The Midland favoured building large numbers of relatively small, low-powered engines to standardised designs. Each engine was cheaper to build and run than a larger equivalent and while more locomotives were required, the Midland's Derby Works was able to achieve economies of scale. The Midland found that a single small engine was sufficient on the majority of its well-graded lines, and that it was more efficient to add either more trains of a shorter length to handle greater demand or to employ multiple small engines (two or three) when heavier trains were needed. This was deemed preferable to building a small number of large engines for the routes and duties that required them which did not fit into Derby's standardised production and risked being underutilised and incurring expensive running costs unnecessarily.

Indeed, the Midland's operations were often based around keeping even its small engines lightly loaded at a time when other railways were not only building larger, more powerful locomotives but working them to their maximum capacity with the heaviest trains possible. The Midland's philosophy was to keep individual train weights as low as was practically possible and run more trains, providing short-term economies in fuel consumption and wear-and-tear on the locomotive, which in the long term meant that Midland locomotives generally enjoyed longer service lives than hard-worked contemporaries on other railways. This was one reason why the relatively undersized standard Midland axle bearing was successfully retained for so long into the 20th century - under Midland operating practices the loads imposed on the bearing by a low-powered locomotive working well within its capabilities were minimised.

The overall interlinked light-use design/operate philosophy was formalised in 1907, when under chairman George Ernest Paget and Traffic Inspector John Follows, the Midland introduced a new traffic management system whereby every locomotive type was assigned a single standardised workload (in contrast to the system used by other railways, including the Midland's main competitor the London and North Western Railway, whereby new or freshly-overhauled locomotives were given higher workloads, with locomotives progressively being assigned less arduous tasks as their condition deteriorated towards the next overhaul). This required that the standard workload had to be, to an extent, a 'worst case' scenario of a worn-out locomotive immediately due for overhaul, with the result that train loads were kept low and engines in good condition were not worked to their maximum. This system also ensured the continuation of the Midland's practice of continuing to run shorter, lighter but more frequent trains (against the industry trend for longer, heavier but fewer services) since the Midland's service timings were calculated based on relatively low power being available.

=== Advantages and Disadvantages ===
The advantages were lower maintenance and fuel costs by ensuring that most engines were not worked to their limit, the permitting of standardised maintenance and inspection intervals (since individual locomotives did not have to be regularly assessed to ascertain their suitability for the work assigned to them) and the simplicity of rostering engines for work, as Midland shed managers could be confident that every engine they had available would be capable of the duty assigned. This allowed the Midland to greatly improve its punctuality and timekeeping - which had been poor in the late 19th century and a source of bad publicity - since the timetables and train loads could be drawn to also assume the standard 'worst case' locomotive power available, while most of the engines actually in service were in better condition than that.

One upshot of the new management system was that the Midland followed the practice common on American railways of putting the role of Motive Power Superintendent (responsible for managing and allocating the railway's locomotive stock in service) under the authority of the Operating Department (with overall responsibility for managing the railway's services and timetables in response to demand) rather than the role being subordinate to the Chief Mechanical Engineer (responsible for providing and maintaining locomotives) as was usual in British railway companies. This had the effect of Midland locomotive policy from approximately 1910, further formalising the concept of more frequent, lighter trains hauled by relatively small locomotives - a situation which favoured the goal of the Operating Department (greater frequency, flexibility and overall volume of services) at the expense of the Motive Power Superintendent's natural preference for a smaller number of more powerful locomotives (a smaller number of more easily-managed, less labour-intensive assets performing the same work) or the ability of the Derby works (under the CME) to design such locomotives.

Smaller, less powerful engines also allowed savings in civil engineering upgrades as they permitted lighter-laid track and cheaper bridges to be retained for longer into the 20th century - thus there is an interaction with Route Availability - primarily based on axle loadings - although this concept was not formalised into classifications in Midland or LMS days (contrast to the Great Western Railway, q.v.). In turn this acted against the widespread adoption of larger, heavier engines as this would require a simultaneous large-scale civil engineering programme to improve the Midland's permanent way and associated structures. Similarly, the Midland was unusual among British railways by continuing to favour roundhouses to stable and service its locomotives instead of the more common longitudinal shed. While a shed could be relatively easy expanded and lengthened to accommodate larger locomotives, the roundhouses could not, further adding a secondary cost to adopting large engines. Another such factor was that decades of running light, short trains meant that the Midland's network featured shorter-than-average sidings and passing loops - if more powerful locomotives were to be procured and used to the full, these would have to be rebuilt to work with longer trains.

The small engine policy served the Midland well when its network was confined to the English Midlands, which is largely free of steep gradients. As the company expanded into other parts of Britain the policy's downsides began to cause problems. The company's own main line to Scotland (the Settle-Carlisle Line) and the Somerset and Dorset Joint Railway (where the Midland was responsible for providing locomotives) were renowned for their steep gradients and the company's locomotive stock proved badly suited to the task. Nonetheless the small engine policy remained and double-heading or banking was used to make up for the shortfall in power. The policy also greatly reduced capacity on the Midland's network as not only were there more (but smaller) trains than there would have been on another railway but further capacity was taken up by the need to accommodate light engines that had been used for piloting or banking duties that were returning to their depots. The small engine policy was a contributing factor to two fatal accidents on the Settle-Carlisle Line, at Hawes Junction and Ais Gill. In the former case it was due to excessive light-engine movements and in the latter due to a train stalling on the main line due to a lack of power.

=== The End of the Policy ===
The small engine policy remained in place into the 1920s and remained an influence during the early years of the Midland's successor the London, Midland and Scottish Railway, its Chief Mechanical Engineer for most of the 1920s being Henry Fowler, a long-standing Midland engineer and former CME of that company. James Anderson was made Chief Motive Power Superintendent of the new LMS. Anderson was also from the Midland, was a trained locomotive engineer, had been draughtsman and works manager at Derby Works and had been appointed temporary CME of the Midland when Fowler was seconded to the British government to manage wartime production of munitions and aircraft. The corporate management structure of the Midland, with the Operating Department overseeing the role of the Motive Power Superintendent, continued in a somewhat de facto fashion in the early years of the LMS.

Midland-era standard designs were continued or lightly updated and constructed for use across the new LMS network. Many of these types proved ill-suited or inadequate for routes and operating practices away from ex-Midland territory - while ex-Midland locomotives were imposed on the new LMS, the operational practices that went with them were not, on top of still-rising demands with regard to train speeds and weights. This left Midland-designed 'small engines' being worked to the full on heavy trains by crews used to working their engines as hard as possible. Under these conditions many of the designs proved inadequate in terms of both performance and reliability (such as the frequent axle bearing failures afflicting many ex-Midland LMS engines in the 1920s) and this left the LMS with a shortage of modern motive power by the late 1920s. Fowler oversaw the introduction of the Royal Scot class locomotives in 1927, which effectively ended the Midland small engine tradition - they were in fact built by the North British Locomotive Company which also had a large part in the design process, further assisted by plans of the Southern Railway's Lord Nelson class being provided to the LMS. Fowler was succeeded by William Stanier in 1932 who brought in a new generation of modern 'large engine' designs, greatly influenced by his previous employer, the Great Western Railway.

== Numbering and classification ==
Before 1907, locomotive numbering was somewhat erratic. New locomotives might take the numbers of old engines, which were placed on the duplicate list and had an A suffix added to their numbers. In 1907, the whole stock were renumbered in a systematic way, each class in a consecutive sequence, classes being ordered by type (passenger/tank/goods), power and age. After the grouping this system was adapted for the whole LMS.

The Midland classified their stock into three classes numbered 1 to 3 with 1 the least powerful and 3 the most. Stock was also split into passenger and freight engines. When the two largest 4-4-0 classes (the 3-cylinder compounds and the "999s") were introduced, these were put into Class 4. This system formed the basis for the subsequent LMS and BR classification systems.

== Engines inherited from constituent companies ==
The Midland Railway formed in 1844 from the Midland Counties Railway, the North Midland Railway and the Birmingham and Derby Junction Railway, and took over a number of others including the Leicester and Swannington Railway and the Birmingham and Gloucester Railway.

For further reading, see:

- Midland Counties Railway Locomotives
- North Midland Railway Locomotives
- Birmingham and Derby Junction Railway Locomotives

== Engines built by the Midland ==
Initially, the Midland concentrated on maintaining and improving the somewhat varied fleet that it had inherited, with the assistance of The Railway Foundry in Leeds. In addition, it bought in twenty-four of their Jenny Lind locomotives and, in 1848, two unique Crampton locomotives.

MR class	Wheel arrangement	Pre-1907 fleet number(s)	Post-1907 fleet number(s)	Manufacturer Serial number(s)	Year(s) built	Quantity	Year(s) withdrawn	Comments
Matthew Kirtley (1844–1873)
130 class	2-2-2	130–135; 120–129	—	Robert Stephenson & Co. (6); Sharp, Stewart & Co. (10)	1852–1854	16	1872–1892	Most survivors rebuilt by Johnson after 1875.
136 class	2-2-2	136–149	—	Derby Works	1856–1858	14	1871–1897	Most survivors rebuilt by Johnson after 1875.
1 class	2-2-2	1…156	—	Derby Works	1859–1862	25	1871–1894	Most survivors rebuilt by Johnson after 1875.
30 class	2-2-2	25–39; 94, 97–100	—	Derby Works	1863–1866	20	1887–1904	Most survivors rebuilt by Johnson after 1875.
137 class	2-4-0	137-140			1846	4	..	
50 class	2-4-0	50–59	—	Derby Works	1862–1864	10	1876–1895	Likely replaced by Johnson's class 50 and 55.
70 class	2-4-0	70–79; 86–89	—	Derby Works	1862–1863	14	1874–1905	Three were given newer Kirtley boilers and cabs.
80 class	2-4-0	80–85	—	Derby Works	1862–1863	6	1876–1895	Built for 1862 exhibition specials.
156 class	2-4-0	101–119; 153–164	1–22	Derby Works	1866–1874	29	1890s–1947	One survivor, 158A, the oldest surviving Midland Railway locomotive.
170 class	2-4-0	170–199	—	Beyer, Peacock & Co.	1867	30	around 1900	
800 class	2-4-0	800–829 (+ various)	23–67	Neilson & Co. (30); Derby Works (18)	1870–1871	48	1905–1936	
890 class	2-4-0	890–909 (+ various)	68–126	Neilson & Co. (20); Derby Works (42)	1871–1875	62	..	
204 class	4-4-0T	204–209	1198–1199	Beyer, Peacock & Co.	1868	6	?-after 1907	Built for services into the City of London.
230 class	2-4-0T	230–239	—	Beyer, Peacock & Co.	1868	10	..	Built for same service as 204 class.
690 class	0-4-4T	690–695	1200–1205	Beyer-Peacock	1869	6	1926–1934	
780 class	0-4-4T	780–799	1206–1225	Dübs & Co.	1870	20	1921–1935	Very similar to 690 class.
222 class	0-6-0WT	222, 320; 223, 221	1604	Derby Works	1860–1863	4	1894–1928	Lickey bankers
30 class	0-6-0ST	1093; 1096–1101		Vulcan Foundry (2); Sharp, Stewart & Co. (5)	1862-1872	7	..	Acquired from Swansea Vale Railway
221 class	0-6-0ST	221	—	Sharp, Stewart & Co.	1863	1	1882	ex Staveley Iron Works, acquired 1866; renumbered 2027 in 1872
1063 class	0-6-0WT	1063–1065	—	Manning Wardle (2) ? (1)	1860–1864	3	1891–1900	ex Sheepbridge Iron Works, acquired 1870
880 class	0-6-0T	880–889	1610–1619	Beyer, Peacock & Co.	1871	10	1924–1927	
2066 class	0-6-0WT	2066–2068	—	Manning Wardle	1873	3	1890–1898	
179 class	0-6-0	179–189	—		1845	11	..	
240 class	0-6-0	240–269; 290–479	2300–2306, 2313-2397, 2712, 2868-2899	Derby Works	1850-1863	230	..	
280 class	0-6-0	280–289	2307–2308	Robert Stephenson & Co.	1853	10	1898–1921	
270 class	0-6-0	270–279	2309–2312	Kitson & Co.	1852–1853	10	1863–1924	
480 class	0-6-0	480–569; 690–699 (+ various)	2398–2591; 2672–2686	Derby Works (97); Dübs & Co. (20); Kitson & Co. (45); Robert Stephenson & Co. (75); Sharp Stewart (20); Yorkshire Engine Co. (10)	1863–1869	237	1902–1945	
700 class	0-6-0	700–779; 830–879; 910–1067 (+ various)	2592–2671; 2687–2867	Derby Works (26); Dübs & Co. (150); John Fowler & Co. (10); Kitson & Co. (10); Neilson & Co. (40); Vulcan Foundry (80)	1869–1874	316	1903–1951	50 to Italy in 1906
Samuel Waite Johnson (1873–1903)
1070 class	2-4-0	1070–1089; 1, 9, 10, 13; 70–71, 74; 96, 146	127–146, 147–156	Sharp, Stewart & Co. (20), Derby Works (10)	1874–1876	30	1912–1950	
50 class	2-4-0	50–54	187–191	Derby Works	1876	5	1926–1936	
55 class	2-4-0	55–59	192–196	Derby Works	1876	5	1924–1939	
1282 class	2-4-0	1282–1311	157–186	Dübs & Co.	1876	30	1922–1948	
1347 class	2-4-0	1347–1356	197–206	Derby Works	1877	10	1919–1941	Renumbered 101–110 in 1879
1400 class	2-4-0	1400–1490; 1472–1491; 1502–1531	207–216; 222–271	Derby Works (30); Neilson & Co. (30)	1879–1881	60	1925–1949	
111 class	2-4-0	111–115	217–221	Derby Works	1880	5	1928–1943	
1492 class	2-4-0	1492–1501	272–281	Derby Works	1881	10	1924–1933	
1312 class	4-4-0	1312–1321	300–309	Kitson & Co.	1876	10	1911–1930	Class 2
1327 class	4-4-0	1327–1346	310–327	Dübs & Co.	1876	20	1904–1934	Class 2
1562 class	4-4-0	1562–1666	328–357	Derby Works	1882–1884	30	1923–1937	Class 2
1667 class	4-4-0	1667–1676	—	Derby Works	1876	10	1896–1901	Class 2
1738 class	4-4-0	1738–1757	358–377	Derby Works	1885	20	1922–1940	Class 2; No. 1757 named Beatrice
1808 class	4-4-0	1808–1822; 80–87, 11, 14	378–402	Derby Works	1888–1891	25	1922–1952	Class 2
2183 class	4-4-0	2183–2202	403–427	Sharp, Stewart & Co. (20); Derby Works (5)	1892–1896	25	1914–1922	Class 2
2203 class	4-4-0	2203–2217; 184–199; 161–164; 230–239	428–472	Sharp, Stewart & Co. (15); Derby Works (30)	1893–1895	45	1914–1931	Class 2
2581 class	4-4-0	2581–2590	473–482	Beyer, Peacock & Co.	1900	10	1914–1927	Class 2
156 class	4-4-0	156–160; 150, 153–155; 204–209; 1667–1676	483–522	Derby Works	1896–1901	20	1912–1918	Class 2
2421 class	4-4-0	2421–2440	502–522	Sharp, Stewart & Co.	1899	20	1912–1913	Class 2
60 class	4-4-0	60–69, 93; 138–139; 151–152; 165–169; 805–809; 2636–2640; 2591–2600	523–562	Derby Works (30); Neilson & Co. (10)	1898–1899	40	1913–15	Class 2
25 class	4-2-2	25–32, 37; 1854–1862	600–607; 610–619	Derby Works	1887–1890	18	1919–1928	
1853 class	4-2-2	1853, 34; 1863–1872; 8, 122, 20; 145, 24, 33; 35–36, 38–39; 4, 16–17, 94; 97–100, 129, 133; 149, 170–178	608–609; 620–659	Derby Works	1893, 1896	42	1920–1927	
179 class	4-2-2	179–183, 75–77, 79, 88	660–669	Derby Works	1893, 1896	10	1925–1927	
115 class	4-2-2	115–121, 123–128, 130–131	670–684	Derby Works	1896–1899	15	1921–1928	One survivor, No. 673.
2601 class	4-2-2	2601–2608; 22–23	685–694	Derby Works	1899–1900	10	1919–1922	2606–2608 renumbered 19–21 in 1900
Class 3 Belpaire	4-4-0	2606–2610; 800–804; 2781–2790; 810–869	700–779	Derby Works	1900–1905	80	1925–1953	
1000 class	4-4-0	2631–2635	1000–1004	Derby Works	1902–1903	5	1948–1952	3-cylinder compound. One survivor, No. 1000.
6 class	0-4-4T	6, 15, 18, 137, 140–144, 147	1226–1235	Derby Works	1875	10	1925–1930	
1252 class	0-4-4T	1262–1281; 1252–1261	1236–1265	Neilson & Co.	1875–1876	30	1920–1954	BR 58031–58038
1532 class	0-4-4T	1532–151; 1632–1656; 1718–1737	1266–1330	Derby Works	1881–1886	65	1920–1956	BR 58039–58051
1823 class 1833 class	0-4-4T	1823–1832; 1322–1326, 202; 1428–1430, 1697; 1833–1842; 2013–2022; 2218–2227	1331–1380	Derby Works (20); Dübs & Co. (30)	1889–1893	50	1925–1959	BR 58052–58072
1322 class	0-4-0ST	1322–1326, 202; 1428–1430, 1697	1500–1507	Derby Works	1883, 1889–1890	10	1907–1949	Nicknamed "Jinties"
1116A class	0-4-0ST	1116A–1120A, 2359–2360, 1131A–1133A	1508–1517	Derby Works	1893, 1897	10	1921–1955	
1134A class	0-4-0ST	1134A–1143A	1518–1527	Derby Works	1897, 1903	10	1922–1958	
1102 class	0-6-0T	1102–1141	1620–1559	Neilson & Co. (25), Vulcan Foundry (15)	1874–1876	40	1920–1931	
1377 class	0-6-0T	(various)	1660–1844	Derby Works (165), Vulcan Foundry (20)	1878–1891	185	1928–1965	"Half-cab". One survivor, No. 41708.
1121 class	0-6-0T	1121–1130; 2248–2252; 2361–2390; 2571–2580	1845–1899	Derby Works (10); Sharp, Stewart & Co. (5); Robert Stephenson & Co. (40)	1895–1900	55	1930–1963	
2228 class	0-4-4T	2228–2247; 690–695, 780–783; 2611–2630	1381–1430	Dübs & Co. (40); Derby Works (10)	1895–1900	50	1931–1957	BR 58073–58091
2441 class	0-6-0T	2441–2460; 2741–2780	1900–1959	Vulcan Foundry	1899–1902	60	1954–1967	LMS 7200–7259 from 1934
2501 class	2-6-0	2501–2510; 2521–2540	2200–2229	Baldwin Locomotive Works	1899	30	1908–1914	
2511 class	2-6-0	2511–2520	2230–2239	Schenectady Locomotive Works	1899	10	1912–1915	
Class 2 & 3 goods	0-6-0	..	..	...	..	..	..	
Richard Deeley (1903–1909)
990 class	4-4-0	—	990–999	Derby Works	1908–1909	10	1925–1928	LMS 801–809 from 1926
1000 class	4-4-0	1000–1029	1005–1044	Derby Works	1905–1909	40	1948–1953	3-cylinder Compound
1528 class	0-4-0T	—	1528–1532	Derby Works	1907	5	1957–1966	
2000 class	0-6-4T	—	2000–2039	Derby Works	1907	40	1935–1938	
Paget locomotive	2-6-2	—	2299	Derby Works	1908	1	1912	
Henry Fowler (1909–1922)
483 class	4-4-0	—	..	Derby Works	1912–1924	165	1948–1963	Renewals of Johnson Class 2
Battery locomotive	Bo	—	1550	Derby Works	1913	1	1964	Renumbered BEL 1 by British Railways
1528 class	0-4-0T	—	1533–1537	Derby Works	1921–1922	5	1957–1966	
Lickey Banker	0-10-0	—	2290	Derby Works	1919	1	1956	
3835 class	0-6-0	—	3835–4026	Derby Works (142); Armstrong Whitworth (50)	1911–1922	197	1954–1965	plus S&DJR 67–71. One survivor, No. 43924.

=== Ex- LT&SR (1912-1922) ===
In 1912 the Midland bought the London, Tilbury and Southend Railway, but this continued to be operated more or less separately. The Midland, and the LMS subsequently built some LT&SR designs.

== Liveries ==
Prior to 1883 painted green. After 1883 the Midland adopted its distinctive crimson lake livery for passenger engines.

== Influence on LMS locomotive policy ==
The London, Midland and Scottish Railway (LMS) continued the Midland's small engine policy until William Stanier arrived in 1933. The last new Midland design was Stanier 0-4-4T of 1932/3 but some Fowler 4Fs were constructed as late as 1941.

== Preservation ==
Five original Midland locomotives have survived, these being:

Image	MR No.	1907 No.	MR Class	Type	Manufacturer	Serial No.	Built	Withdrawn	Notes
	158A	2	156	2-4-0	Derby Works	—	1866	1947	Rebuilt 1881, 1897; Deeley Class 1
	1418	1708	1377	0-6-0T	Derby Works	—	1880	1965	Rebuilt 1896, 1926; Deeley Class 1
	118	673	115	4-2-2	Derby Works	—	1897	1928	Rebuilt 1909; Deeley Class 1
	2631	1000	1000	4-4-0	Derby Works	—	1902	1959	Rebuilt 1914; Deeley Class 4 Compound
	—	3924	3835	0-6-0	Derby Works	—	1920	1965	Class 4 Goods. First locomotive to leave Woodham Brothers scrapyard in September 1968.
