= Midland Railway 115 Class =

Class of 15 British 4-2-2- locomotives

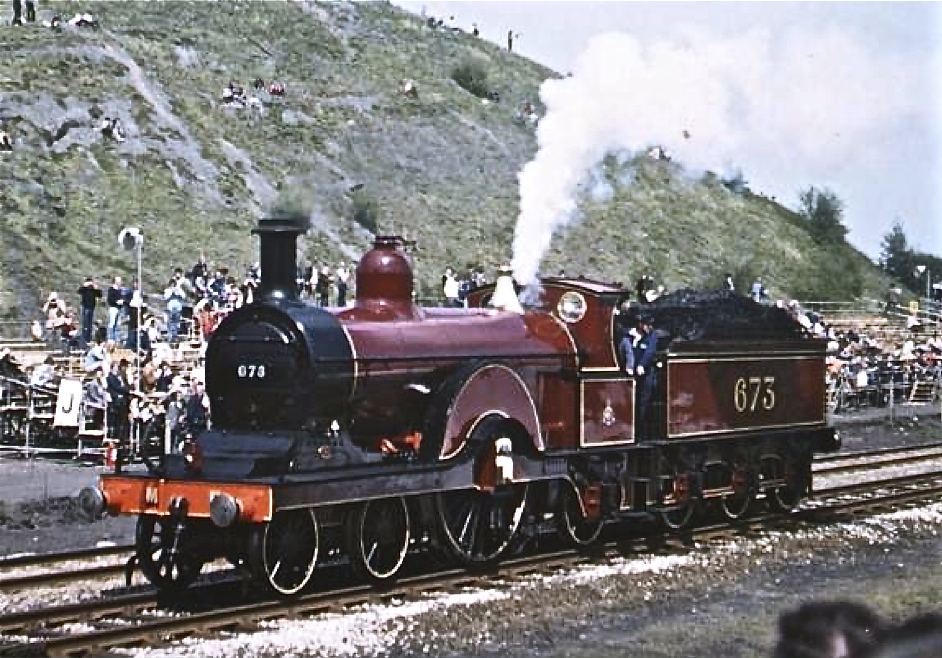
- No. 673 at the Rainhill Trials 150th anniversary cavalcade in 1980
Type and origin
- Power type: Steam
- Designer: Samuel Waite Johnson
- Builder: Derby Works
- Build date: 1896–1897 (5), 1899 (10)
- Total produced: 15
Specifications
- Configuration
  - Whyte: 4-2-2
  - UIC: 2′A1 n2
- Gauge: 4 ft 8 1/2 in (1,435 mm) standard gauge
- Leading dia.: 3 ft 6 in (1.067 m)
- Driver dia.: 7 ft 9 1/2 in (2.375 m)
- Axle load: 18 long tons 10 cwt (18.8 t)
- Loco weight: 47 long tons 6 1/2 cwt (48.08 t)
- Tender weight: 41 long tons 4 cwt (41.9 t) loaded
- Total weight: 88 long tons 10 1/2 cwt (89.95 t)
- Fuel type: Coal
- Fuel capacity: 4 long tons (4.1 t; 4.5 short tons)
- Water cap.: 3,500 imp gal (16,000 L; 4,200 US gal)
- Boiler: MR type E
- Boiler pressure: 170 psi (1.17 MPa)
- Cylinders: Two, inside
- Cylinder size: 19 1/2 by 26 inches (495 by 660 millimetres)
Performance figures
- Tractive effort: 15,279 lbf (68.0 kN)
Career
- Operators: Midland Railway; London, Midland and Scottish Railway
- Class: 115
- Numbers: New: 115–121, 123–128, 130–131; 1907: 670–684
- Nicknames: Spinners
- Withdrawn: 1921–1928
- Disposition: 1 preserved, 14 scrapped

The Midland Railway 115 Class was the third of four classes of 4-2-2 steam locomotive, nicknamed "Spinners", designed by Samuel Waite Johnson. A total of 15 of the class were built between 1896 and 1899. They were capable of reaching speeds of up to 90 miles per hour (140 km/h). One engine, No. 673, is preserved in the National Collection.

== Classes of Midland Railway 4-2-2 locomotives ==
Single-driver locomotives had been superseded in the late 19th century as loads increased, but were then reintroduced when steam sanding allowed better adhesion. Five similar classes were built, with slight enlargements each time, and details as follows:

Midland Railway 4-2-2 classes
Class	Quantity	Years built	Driving wheels	Cylinders	Boiler pressure
25 class	18	1887–90	7 ft 4 in (2.24 m)	18 in × 26 in (460 mm × 660 mm), slide valves	160 lbf/in^{2} (1,100 kPa)
1853 class	42	1889–93	7 ft 6 in (2.29 m)	18 1/2 in × 26 in (470 mm × 660 mm), slide valves	160 lbf/in^{2} (1,100 kPa)
179 class	10	1893–96	7 ft 6 in (2.29 m)	19 in × 26 in (480 mm × 660 mm), piston valves	160 lbf/in^{2} (1,100 kPa)
115 class	15	1896–99	7 ft 9 in (2.36 m)	19 1/2 in × 26 in (500 mm × 660 mm), piston valves	170 lbf/in^{2} (1,200 kPa)
2601 class	10	1899–1900	7 ft 9 1/2 in (2.37 m)	19 1/2 in × 26 in (500 mm × 660 mm), piston valves	180 lbf/in^{2} (1,200 kPa)

== Construction history ==
The fifteen locomotives in the 115 class were built in two batches, both at Derby Works.

Table of orders and numbers
Original No.	1907 (& LMS) No.	Derby Works Order No.	Year	Notes
115–119	670–674	1474	1896–97	
120, 121, 123–128, 130, 131	675–684	1659	1899	

== Service history ==
It was quite common for the class to pull an express weighing 200–250 long tons (203–254 t; 224–280 short tons), which suited them perfectly. Given a dry rail, they could maintain a tight schedule with 350 long tons (356 t; 392 short tons). Speeds up to 90 mph (140 km/h) were not uncommon, and the sight of their large, spinning driving wheels with no visible connecting rods earned them the nickname "Spinners". Due to the Midland's practice of building low-powered locomotives and relying on double-heading to cope with heavier trains, many had working lives of up to 30 years. They made ideal pilot engines for the later Johnson/Deeley 4-4-0 classes.

=== Renumbering ===
In the Midland Railway 1907 renumbering scheme, they were assigned numbers 670–684. During World War I most were placed in store, but were then pressed into service afterward as pilots on the Nottingham to London coal trains. Twelve locomotives survived to the 1923 grouping, keeping their Midland Railway numbers in LMS service. Nevertheless by 1927 only three of the class remained, with the last engine, 673 (formerly 118) being withdrawn in 1928 and subsequently preserved.

Table of withdrawals
Year	Quantity in service at start of year	Quantity withdrawn	Locomotive numbers	Notes
1921	15	2	675, 684	
1922	13	1	681	
1925	12	2	674, 676	
1926	10	8	670–672, 677, 678, 680, 682, 683	
1928	2	2	673, 679	

== Preservation ==
No. 673 is the sole survivor of its class. It was steamed around 1976–1980 when it took part in the Rainhill Trials 150th cavalcade but is currently a static exhibit in the National Railway Museum in York but not on display currently.

== Gallery ==
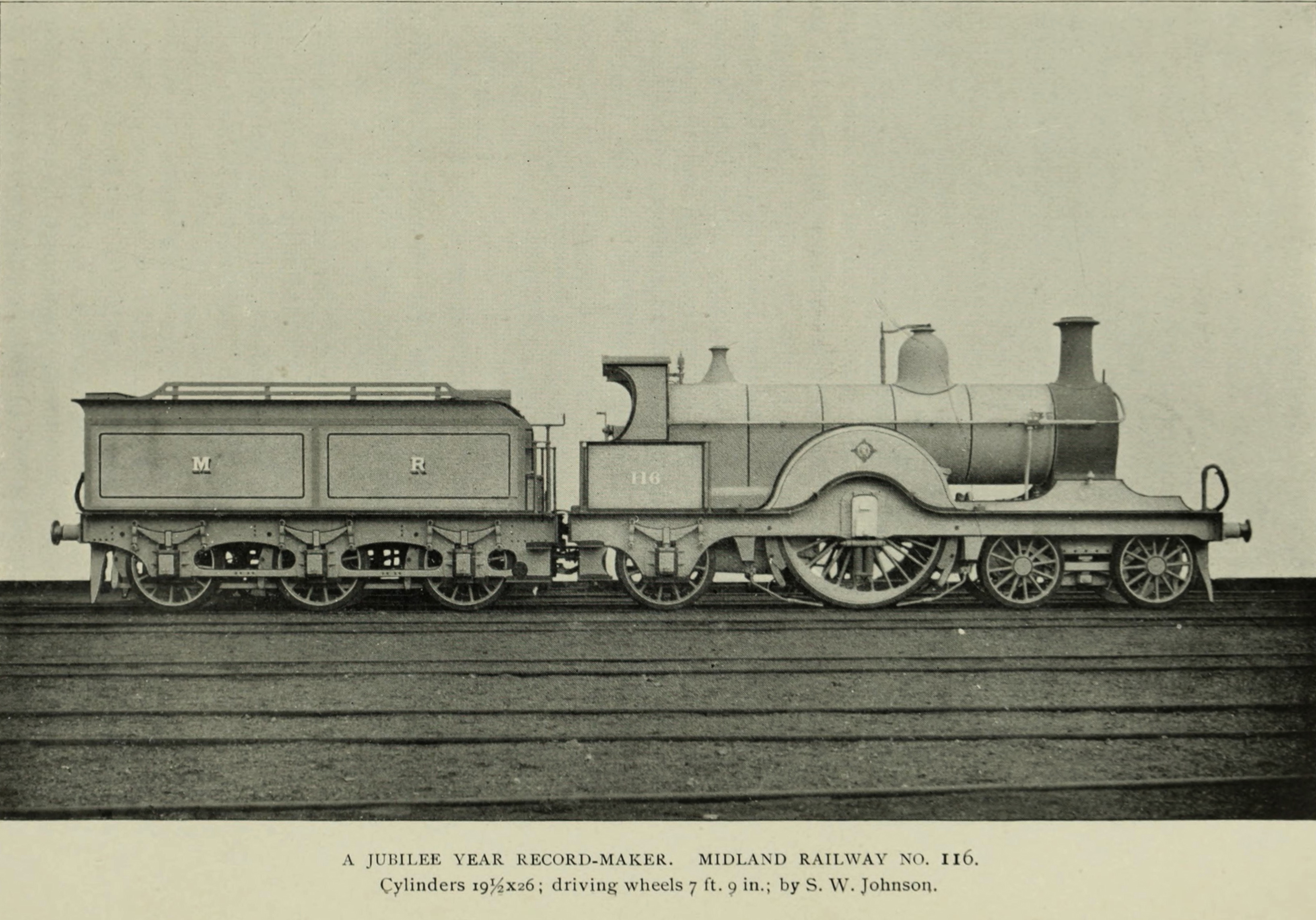
Caption: "A Jubilee Year Record-Maker. Midland Railway No. 116."
In 1897, No. 116 (shown here in photographic grey) reached a speed of 90 mph (140 km/h) while under full load, at that time the highest recorded speed in the UK.

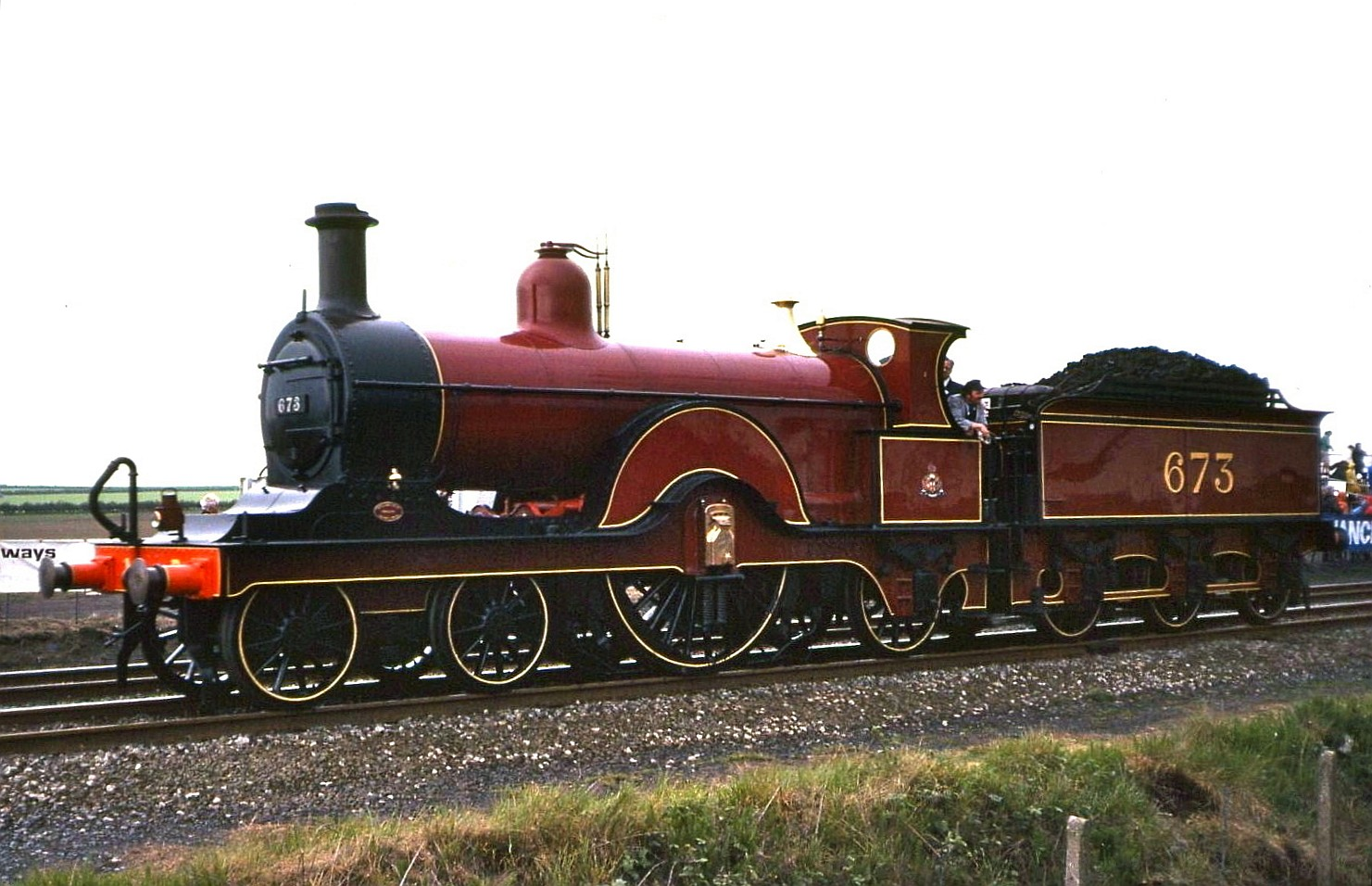
Preserved No. 673 in Midland Railway crimson lake livery at the Rocket 150 celebration in Rainhill in May 1980.

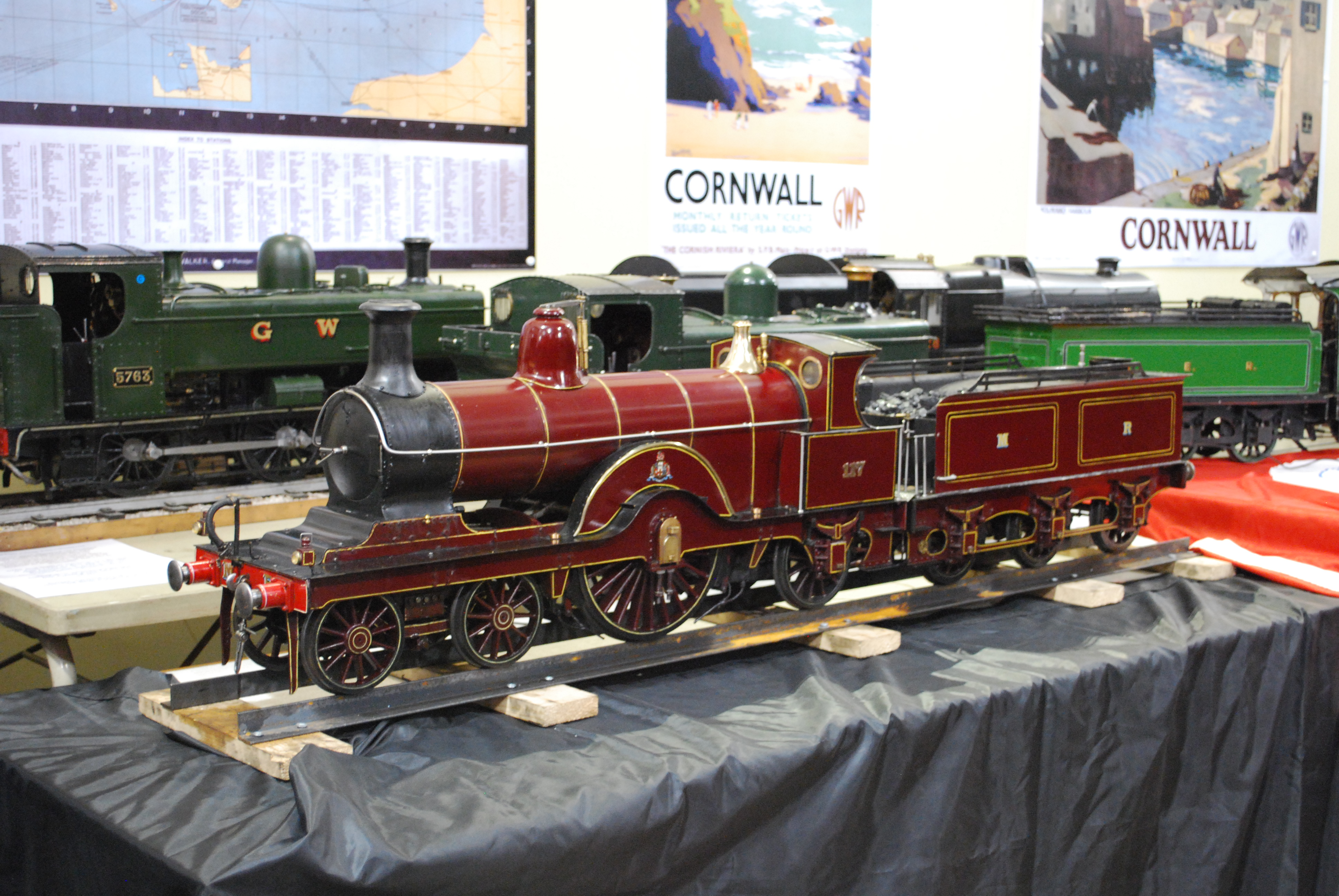
Model of No. 117. Note the differences to No. 673, both in construction (smokebox door, handrail) and livery (base of smokebox red lined with yellow; boiler bands picked out in yellow; springs red lined with yellow; wheel spokes red; different lining on tender sides; number, coat of arms and MR initials in different locations.
