= Midland Railway 1532 Class =

Class of British steam locomotives

Midland Railway 1532 class
Type and origin
- Power type: Steam
- Designer: Samuel W. Johnson
- Builder: Derby Works
- Order number: Derby: 289, 415, 460, 538, 589
- Build date: 1881–1886
- Total produced: 65
Specifications
- Configuration
  - Whyte: 0-4-4T
  - UIC: B2′ n2t
- Gauge: 4 ft 8 1/2 in (1,435 mm) standard gauge
- Driver dia.: 5 ft 3 1/2 in (1.613 m)
- Trailing dia.: 3 ft 0 1/2 in (0.927 m)
- Wheelbase
  - Axle spacing (Asymmetrical): 8 ft 0 in (2.438 m) +; 9 ft 9 in (2.972 m) +; 5 ft 0 in (1.524 m)
  - Engine: 22 ft 9 in (6.934 m)
  - Drivers: 8 ft 0 in (2.438 m)
  - Trailing: 5 ft 0 in (1.524 m)
- Loco weight: 50 long tons 9 cwt (51.3 t; 56.5 short tons)
- Fuel type: Coal
- Firebox
  - Type: Round-top
- Boiler: MR type C
- Boiler pressure: 150–160 lbf/in^{2} (1.03–1.10 MPa)
- Heating surface: 1,254 sq ft (116.5 m^{2})
- Cylinders: Two, inside
- Cylinder size: New: 17 in × 24 in (432 mm × 610 mm); later: 18 in × 24 in (457 mm × 610 mm)
- Valve gear: Stephenson
- Valve type: Slide valves
Performance figures
- Tractive effort: New: 15,490 lbf (68.90 kN); later: 15,490 lbf (68.90 kN)
Career
- Operators: Midland Railway; → London, Midland and Scottish Railway; → British Railways
- Power class: 1P
- Numbers: New: 1532–1551, 1632–1656, and 1718–1737; 1907: 1266–1330; 1948: 58039–58051
- Locale: London Midland Region
- Withdrawn: August 1919 – October 1956
- Disposition: All scrapped

The Midland Railway 1532 class was a class of 65 0-4-4T locomotives built by Derby Works between 1881 and 1886 to the design of Samuel W. Johnson. They were a development of the 1252 class. Originally numbered 1532–1551, 1632–1656, and 1718–1737; under the 1907 renumbering scheme they became 1266–1330, and were given the power classification 1P.

== Construction history ==
The sixty-five engines of this class were all built by Derby Works using the type C boiler that had also been used on the previous class – the 1252 – and the class before that – the 6 class. The driving wheel diameter was reduced to 5 ft 3 1/2 in (1.613 m) from the 1252's 5 ft 6 1/2 in (1.689 m) – the 6 class had used 5 ft 3 in (1.600 m) drivers. The wheelbase was the same as the previous two classes, as was the cylinder bore and stroke at 17 in × 24 in (432 mm × 610 mm). All three classes had their cylinder bore increased to 18 in (457 mm).

Table of orders and numbers
Original No.	1907 (& LMS) No.	Derby Works Order No.	Year	Notes
1532–1551	1266–1285	289	1881–1882	1547–51 fitted with condensing gear
1632–1636	1286–1290	415	1883	
1637–1656	1291–1310	460	1884	
1718–1727	1311–1320	538	1886	1718–25 fitted with condensing gear
1728–1737	1321–1330	589	1886	

== Service history ==
All were in service at the 1907 renumbering, and all bar three passed to the London, Midland and Scottish Railway at the 1923 Grouping, the exceptions were two that had been withdrawn and a third No. 1305, that had been transferred to the Somerset and Dorset Joint Railway in January 1921; it came into LMS stock when the S&DJR stock was absorbed in January 1930.

Withdrawals started in 1919, and fourteen locomotives were still in LMS stock at the end of 1947, to be inherited by British Railways.

No. 1307 was withdrawn in January 1948; in March the remaining thirteen (1272/73/75/78/90/95/98, 1303/15/22/24/30) were allocated the BR numbers 58039–58051, although five did not receive their BR numbers before their withdrawal. The last, 58051 was withdrawn in October 1956.

None were preserved.

Table of withdrawals
Year	Quantity in service at start of year	Quantity withdrawn	Locomotive numbers	Notes
1919	65	1	1281	
1920	64	1	1282	
1921	63	1	1305	to S&DJR 54
1924	62	3	1280, 1311/19	
1925	59	5	1268/70, 1314/16/23	
1926	54	1	1283	
1927	53	2	1271/84	
1930	51	7	1291/99, 1304/08/18/26/28	1305 absorbed from S&DJR
1931	45	6	1285/88-89/92, 1305/20	
1933	39	1	1317	
1934	38	4	1309-10/13/21	
1935	34	6	1266/69/93, 1306/12/29	
1936	28	1	1301	
1937	27	3	1274/79, 1325	
1938	24	3	1276/96, 1300	
1940	21	1	1327	
1944	20	1	1267	
1946	19	5	1277/86/94/97, 1302	
1948	14	3	1272/90, 1307	
1949	11	1	1315	
1950	10	2	1322, 58041	
1951	8	4	58042–43/45–46	
1952	4	1	58047	
1953	3	1	1324	
1955	2	1	58040	
1956	1	1	58051	

== Models ==
Bachmann Branchline announced on 8 January 2017 that it would be producing models of the class in Midland Railway Maroon, LMS Black and BR Black. An SDJR Prussian Blue Livery was also made for the Collector Club

== Bibliography ==
- Baxter, Bertram (1982). Baxter, David (ed.). British Locomotive Catalogue 1825–1923. Vol. 3A: Midland Railway and its constituent companies. Ashbourne, Derbyshire: Moorland Publishing Company. ISBN 9780903485524.
- Casserley, H. C. & Johnston, Stuart W. (1974) [1966]. Locomotives at the Grouping 3: London, Midland and Scottish Railway. Shepperton, Surrey: Ian Allan. ISBN 0-7110-0554-0.
