= Midland Railway 130 Class =

Class of railway engines

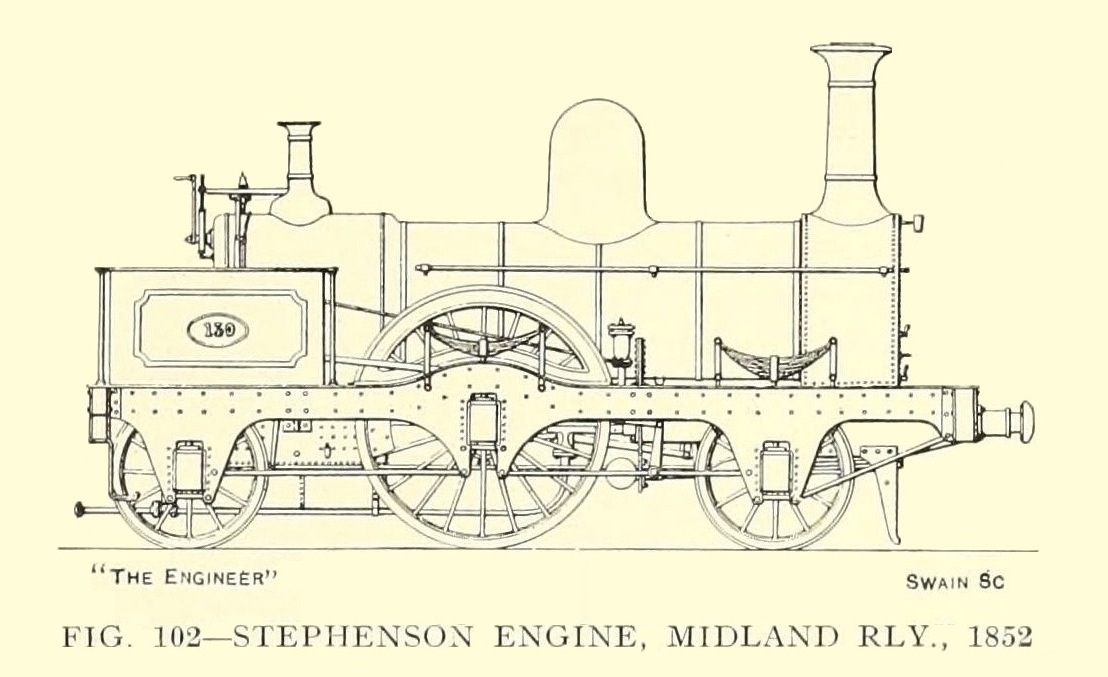
- Sketch of the locomotive
Type and origin
- Power type: Steam
- Designer: Matthew Kirtley (rebuilt by Samuel W. Johnson)
- Build date: 1852–1866
- Total produced: 75
Specifications
- Configuration
  - Whyte: 2-2-2
- Driver dia.: 6 ft 8 in (2.032 m)
- Loco weight: 29.5 long tons (30.0 t)
- Fuel type: Coal
- Cylinders: Two, inside
- Cylinder size: 16 in × 22 in (410 mm × 560 mm)
Career
- Withdrawn: 1876–1905
- Disposition: All scrapped

The Midland Railway 130 Class was a class of 2-2-2 tender engines built, intended for express passenger duties. They were designed by Matthew Kirtley. In total 75 of the class were built in several batches between 1853 and 1866. Many were rebuilt by Samuel W. Johnson with cabs and new fireboxes after 1875. They were also divided into four classes: the 130 class of 1852, the 136 class of 1856–1861, the 1 class of 1859–1862, and the 30 class of 1865–1866.
