= Builder's photo =

Photo taken to illustrate characteristics of a locomotive

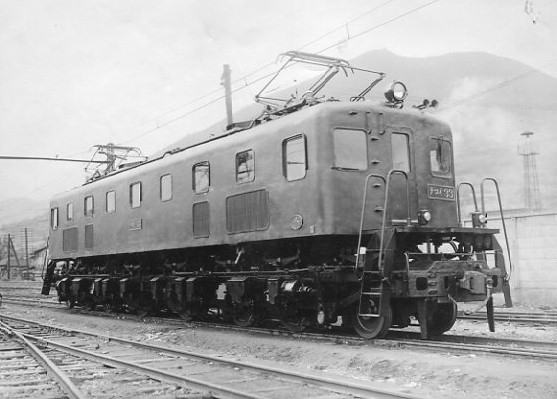
1946 builder's photo of a DeRoI-33 electric locomotive built by Mitsubishi. The photograph's background shows a reduced contrast to place more emphasis on the locomotive.

A builder's photo, also called an official photo, is a specific type of photograph that is typically made by rail transport rolling stock manufacturers to show a vehicle that has been newly built or rebuilt. The builder's photo is meant to show an overview of the basic exterior form of a unit of rolling stock. Builder's photos were also made by some automobile manufacturers to show a representative sample of new models they produced.

Prints of builder's photos were also often made for executives of the manufacturers and railroad companies to hang in their offices. Builder's photos were also reproduced as post cards as well as reprinted in advertisements to promote the railroad companies or manufacturers depicted therein. In the United Kingdom, steam locomotives were often temporarily painted in photographic grey color schemes so they would photograph well in black and white images. Some details in darker-colored areas of the subject were also sometimes painted in a high-contrast bright color to ensure that they would be visible in the photograph. Historians and preservationists use builder's photos as official references to show the equipment as-built.

Builder's photos are commonly shot from an angle that shows one end, often the designated front end, and a full side of the car or locomotive. The rolling stock is normally positioned on a section of track with no other rolling stock coupled to it for the photograph. Sometimes the photograph was further processed to reduce the contrast of or even entirely remove the background to further highlight the rolling stock that was photographed.

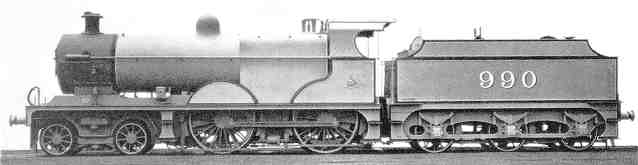
A side-view builder's photo of a Midland Railway 990 Class locomotive circa 1909. The locomotive was painted in photographic grey for the photo.

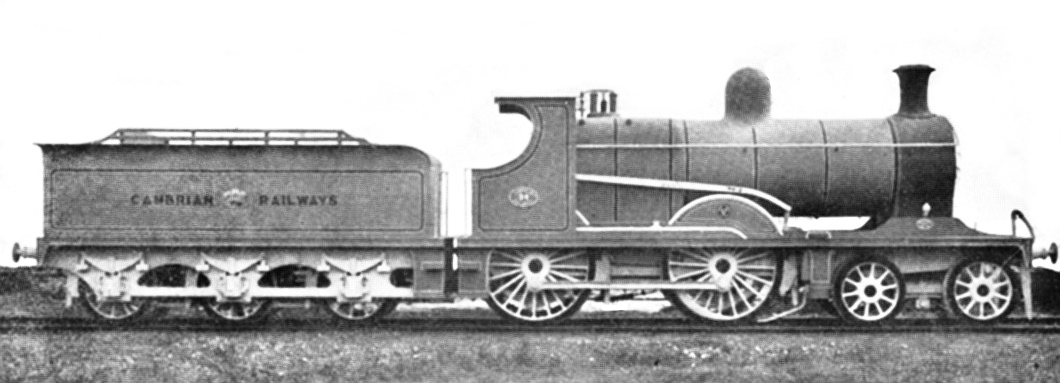
Cambrian Railways 94 Class locomotive side-view builder's photo

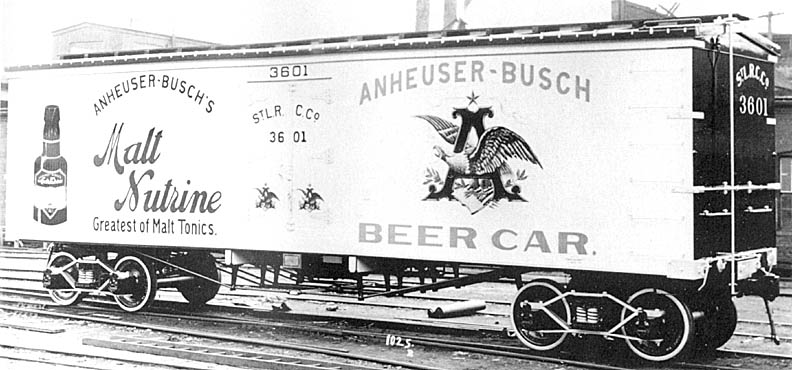
A builder's photo of an ACF refrigerator car from before 1911. The wheel rims and truck sideframes were painted white to highlight their outlines in the photograph.

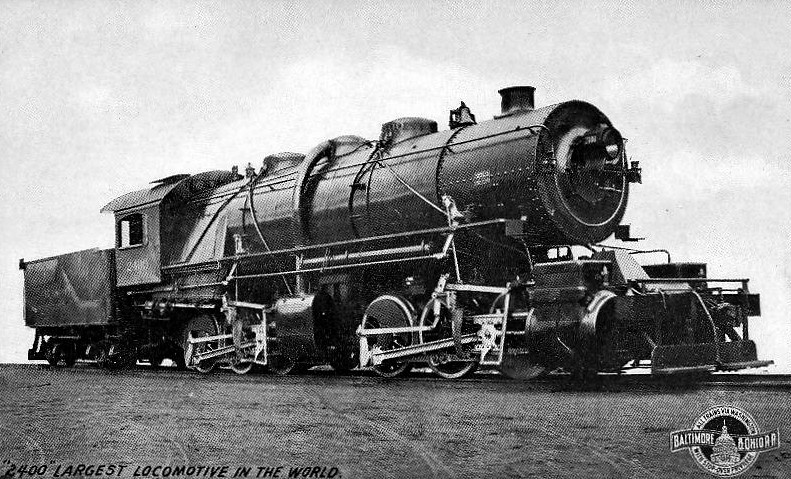
A builder's photo of "Old Maude", the Baltimore and Ohio Railroad's (B&O) mallet locomotive, circa 1900; used on a promotional postcard

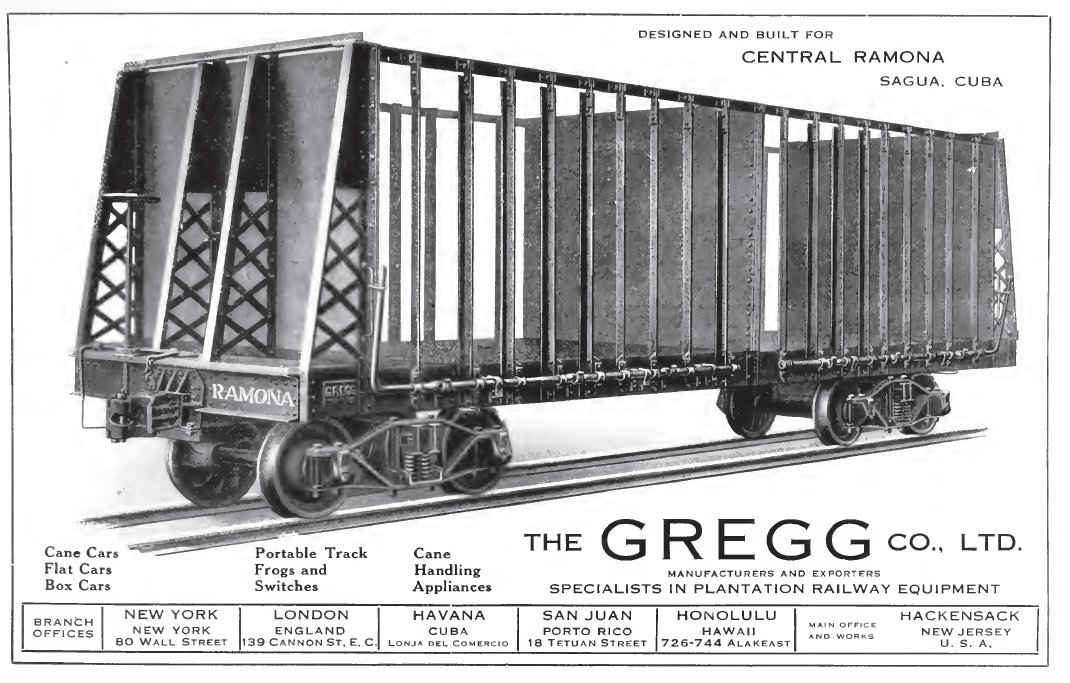
A builder's photo of a sugarcane car by the Gregg Company, used in an advertisement

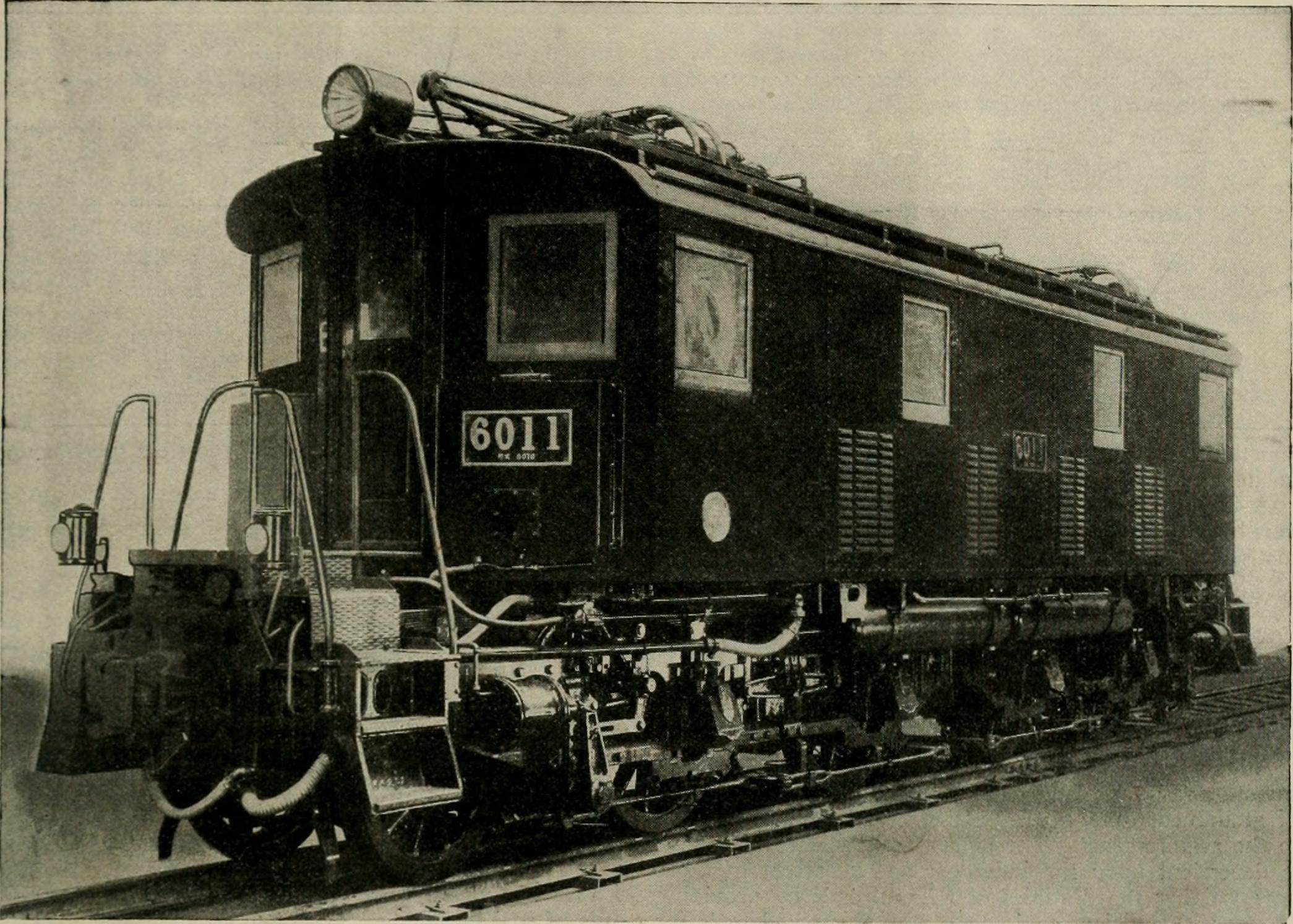
A builder's photo of a Japanese Government Railways class 6010 locomotive by Baldwin and Westinghouse

== See also ==
- Builder's plate
- Railwayana
- Photographic grey
