= Midland Railway 1252 Class =

Class of British steam locomotives

Midland Railway 1252 class
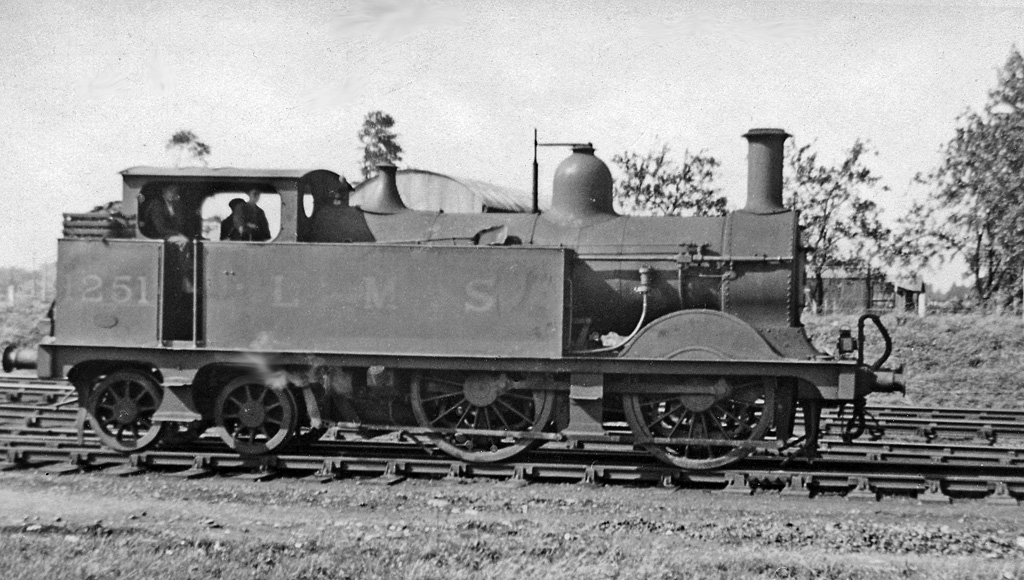
- LMS 1251 at Ashchurch, September 1946
Type and origin
- Power type: Steam
- Designer: Samuel W. Johnson
- Builder: Neilson and Company
- Build date: 1875–1876
- Total produced: 30
Specifications
- Configuration
  - Whyte: 0-4-4T
  - UIC: B2′ n2t
- Gauge: 4 ft 8 1/2 in (1,435 mm)
- Driver dia.: 5 ft 6 1/2 in (1,689 mm)
- Trailing dia.: 3 ft 0 in (914 mm)
- Loco weight: 53 long tons 4 cwt (119,200 lb or 54.1 t)
- Boiler: MR type C
- Boiler pressure: 140 lbf/in^{2} (0.97 MPa)
- Cylinder size: 17 in × 24 in (432 mm × 610 mm)
- Valve gear: Stephenson
Performance figures
- Tractive effort: 13,810 lbf (61.43 kN)
Career
- Operators: MR » LMS » BR
- Power class: 1P
- Withdrawn: 1920–1954
- Disposition: All scrapped

The Midland Railway 1252 class was a class of thirty 0-4-4T locomotives built by Neilson and Company in 1875–1876 to the design of Samuel Waite Johnson. They were a development of the 6 Class. Originally numbers 1262–1281 and 1252–1261. Under the Midland Railway's 1907 renumbering scheme they became 1236–1265.

== Construction history ==
The Midland used nominal 5-foot-6 1/2-inch (1,689 mm) diameter driving wheels for this class, whereas in all later engines (starting with the 1532 Class) they used nominal 5-foot-3-inch (1,600 mm) diameter wheels. They were given the power classification 1P.

Table of orders and numbers
Original No.	1907 (& LMS) No.	Manufacturer	Works Nos.	Year	Notes
1262–1274	1236–1246	Neilson & Co.	2038–2050	1875	
1280–1281	1247–1248	Neilson & Co.	2051–2052	1876	
1252–1261	1254–1265	Neilson & Co.	? – ?	1876	
1275–1279	1249–1253	Neilson & Co.	? – ?	1876	

== Service history ==
All but one locomotive passed to the London, Midland and Scottish Railway (LMS) at the 1923 grouping; and nine, Nos 1239/46/47/49/51/52/55/60/61 were still in LMS stock at the end of 1947 and passed to British Railways (BR). BR allocated them numbers 58030–58038, though only three 58033/36/38 received them before withdrawal. All members of the class were withdrawn and scrapped by 1954.

Table of withdrawals
Year	Quantity in service at start of year	Quantity withdrawn	Locomotive numbers	Notes
1920	30	1	1245	
1925	29	1	1248	
1926	28	1	1254	
1927	27	2	1243, 1264	
1928	25	1	1256	
1929	24	2	1244, 1265	
1930	22	2	1237, 1262	
1931	20	1	1257	
1932	19	3	1241, 1242, 1250	
1934	16	2	1236, 1259	
1935	14	1	1238	
1936	13	1	1263	
1937	12	1	1258	
1945	11	1	1240	
1946	10	1	1253	
1948	9	1	1262	
1949	8	3	1239, 1246, 1247	
1950	5	4	1251, 1252, 58036, 58033	
1954	1	1	58038	
