= Midland Railway 2511 Class =

Class of US-built steam locomotives

Midland Railway 2511 class
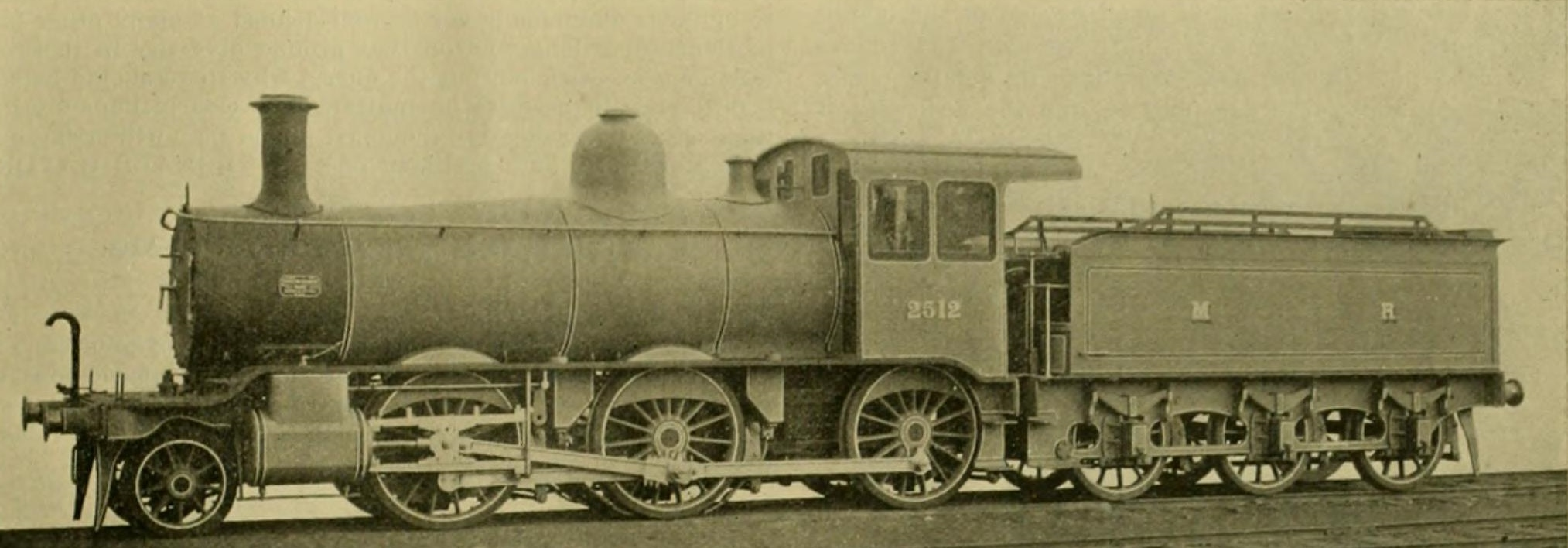
- Works Photograph of number 2512
Type and origin
- Power type: Steam
- Builder: Schenectady Locomotive Works
- Serial number: 5037–5046
- Build date: 1899
- Total produced: 10
Specifications
- Configuration
  - Whyte: 2-6-0
  - UIC: 1′C n2
- Gauge: 4 ft 8 1/2 in (1,435 mm)
- Leading dia.: 3 ft 0 in (914 mm)
- Driver dia.: 5 ft 0 in (1,524 mm)
- Length: over buffers: 51 ft 11 1/4 in (15.83 m)
- Axle load: 14 long tons 4 cwt (31,800 lb or 14.4 t)
- Adhesive weight: 41 long tons 1 cwt (92,000 lb or 41.7 t)
- Loco weight: 49 long tons 15.5 cwt (111,500 lb or 50.6 t)
- Tender weight: 37 long tons 0 cwt (82,900 lb or 37.6 t)
- Tender type: Three-axle
- Fuel type: Coal
- Water cap.: 3,250 imp gal (14,800 L; 3,900 US gal)
- Boiler pressure: 160 lbf/in^{2} (1.10 MPa)
- Cylinders: Two, outside
- Cylinder size: 18 in × 24 in (457 mm × 610 mm)
- Valve gear: Stephenson, inside
- Valve type: Slide valves
Performance figures
- Tractive effort: 17,626 lbf (78.40 kN)
Career
- Operators: Midland Railway
- Class: 2511
- Numbers: New: 2511–2520, 1907: 2230–2239
- Delivered: 1899
- Withdrawn: 1912 – 1915
- Disposition: All scrapped

The Midland Railway 2511 Class was a class of 2-6-0 steam locomotives built by the Schenectady Locomotive Works in the United States, as a supplemental order to the 2501 Class built by Baldwin that same year. As with that class, the Midland had turned to American locomotive builders, as their own Derby Works had reached capacity, and was unable to produce additional engines at the time, and many British locomotive builders were recovering from an 1897-1898 labor dispute over working hours.

== History ==
The engines were designed and built with more consideration to British practice than the 2501 class had been. While the engines retained some distinct features of American practice, such as the use of bar frames, they had cleaner lines, with sandboxes placed below the boilers, as well as three-axle rigid tenders.

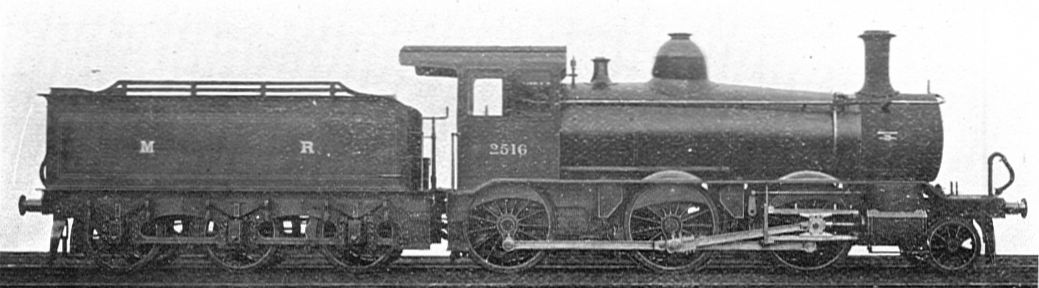
Works Photograph of No. 2516

== Numbers ==
Originally numbered 2511–2520, in the Midland's 1907 renumbering scheme the Schenectadies became No. 2230–2239, in the same order.

== Withdrawal ==
Being non-standard, they had a short life and were all withdrawn between March 1912 and August 1915 and later scrapped.

Table of withdrawals
Year	Quantity in service at start of year	Quantity withdrawn	Locomotive numbers	Notes
1912	10	1	2238	
1913	9	6	2230–2232, 2234, 2236, 2239	
1914	3	2	2235, 2237	
1915	1	1	2233	
