= Samuel Waite Johnson =

English railway engineer

Samuel W. Johnson
- Born: 14 October 1831; Bramley, Yorkshire, England
- Died: 14 January 1912 (aged 80); Nottingham, England
- Resting place: Church (Rock) Cemetery, Nottingham
- Education: Leeds Grammar School
- Children: Son, James Johnson
- Parent(s): Father, James Johnson
- Engineering career
- Discipline: Mechanical engineering

Samuel Waite Johnson (14 October 1831 – 14 January 1912) was an English railway engineer, and was Chief Mechanical Engineer (CME) of the Midland Railway from 1873 to 1903. He was born in Bramley, Yorkshire and educated at Leeds Grammar School.

== Career ==
Johnson learned to become an engineer at the locomotive builders E.B.Wilson and Company.

In 1859 Johnson became Acting Locomotive Superintendent at the Manchester, Sheffield and Lincolnshire Railway. In 1864 he was appointed Locomotive Superintendent of the Edinburgh and Glasgow Railway. In 1866, after only two years in Scotland he replaced Robert Sinclair of the Great Eastern Railway (GER) at Stratford Works. There he stayed for seven years until moving to the Midland Railway (MR) at Derby, where he stayed until his retirement in 1904. At the time of appointment to the Midland Railway on 1 July 1873, he was paid a salary of £2,000 per year (equivalent to £223,800 in 2023), rising to £3,500 in 1896 (equivalent to £511,600 in 2023) where it remained until his retirement on 31 December 1903.

== Locomotive designs ==
=== Great Eastern Railway ===
See: Locomotives of the Great Eastern Railway

=== Midland Railway ===
See: Locomotives of the Midland Railway

- 115 and 2601 classes of 4-2-2 Spinners
- Class 4 compound 4-4-0
- 179 class
- 483 class
- 1116A class 0-4-0ST
- 1377 class 0-6-0T
- 1738 class
- 6 class 0-4-4T (1875)
- 1252 class 0-4-4T (1875–76)
- 1532 class 0-4-4T (1881–86)
- 1823 class 0-4-4T (1889–93)
- 2228 class 0-4-4T (1895–1900)
- 2441 class 0-6-0T
- Class 2 & 3 goods engines 0-6-0
- 2501 class – 30 2-6-0 locomotives built at the Baldwin Locomotive Works, USA
- 2511 class – 10 2-6-0 locomotives built at the Schenectady Locomotive Works, USA

== Family ==
In 1857, Johnson married Emily Priestman in Chipping Ongar, Essex. By 1871 they had had four daughters and one son and were living in Hackney. By 1891 they were living in Nottingham. Emily died prior to 1911.

S. W. Johnson's father, James Johnson, worked for the Great Northern Railway (GNR) for sixteen years before becoming engineer of the North Staffordshire Railway (NSR). S. W. Johnson's son, also James Johnson, was locomotive superintendent of the Great North of Scotland Railway (GNSR) from 1890 to 1894.

Business positions
Preceded by Robert Sinclair	Locomotive Superintendent of the Great Eastern Railway; 1866–1873	Succeeded by William Adams
Preceded by Matthew Kirtley	Chief Mechanical Engineer of Midland Railway; 1873–1903	Succeeded by Richard Deeley
Professional and academic associations
Preceded by Edward Windsor Richards	President of the Institution of Mechanical Engineers; 1898	Succeeded by Sir William Henry White
