= Midland Railway 1121 Class =

Class of British steam locomotives

Midland Railway 1121 class
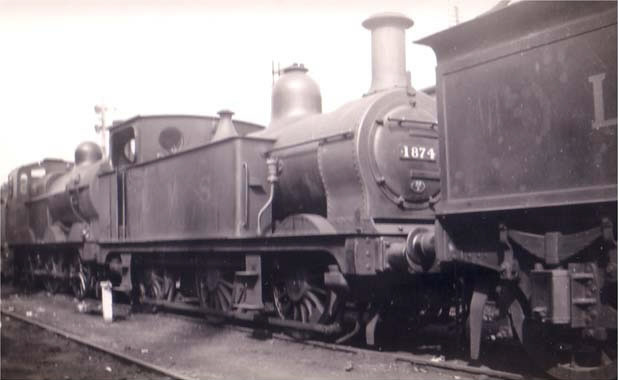
- LMS 1874
Type and origin
- Power type: Steam
- Designer: Samuel W. Johnson
- Builder: Derby Works (10); Sharp, Stewart & Co. (5); Robert Stephenson & Co. (40)
- Build date: 1895–1899
- Total produced: 55
Specifications
- Configuration
  - Whyte: 0-6-0T
  - UIC: C n2t
- Gauge: 4 ft 8 1/2 in (1,435 mm)
- Driver dia.: 4 ft 6 in (1.372 m)
- Wheelbase
  - Axle spacing (Asymmetrical): 7 ft 4 in (2.235 m) +; 8 ft 2 in (2.489 m)
- Boiler: MR type A1
- Boiler pressure: 160 lbf/in^{2} (1.1 MPa)
- Heating surface: 1,120 sq ft (104 m^{2})
- Cylinders: Two, inside
- Cylinder size: 17 in × 24 in (432 mm × 610 mm)
Career
- Operators: Midland Railway; London, Midland and Scottish Railway; British Railways
- Power class: 1F
- Numbers: MR: 1121–1130, 2248–2252, 2361–2390, 2571–2580; LMS: 1845–1899; BR: 41846–41890 (with gaps)
- Locale: London Midland Region
- Withdrawn: December 1930 – July 1963
- Disposition: All scrapped

The Midland Railway 1121 class was a class of 0-6-0T tank locomotives designed by Samuel W. Johnson for the Midland Railway. Fifty-five were built between 1895 and 1900: ten by the railway company's Derby Works, five by Sharp, Stewart and Company, and the remaining forty by Robert Stephenson and Company.

== Construction history ==
The class were a development of the 1377 class “half cabs”. They differed by having the A1 type boiler in place of the earlier's type A. The wheelbase was stretched by 6 inches (150 mm) – all between the main and rear driving wheels. They also had a full cab.

Table of orders and numbers
| Original No. | 1907 (& LMS) No. | Manufacturer | Works Nos. | Qty | Year | Notes |
|---|---|---|---|---|---|---|
| 1121–1130 | 1845–1854 | Derby Works | (order no. 1395) | 10 | 1895 | |
| 2248–2252 | 1855–1859 | Sharp, Stewart & Co. | 4062–4066 | 5 | 1895 | |
| 2361–2390 | 1860–1889 | R. Stephenson & Co. | 2931–2960 | 30 | 1899 | |
| 2571–2580 | 1890–1899 | R. Stephenson & Co. | 2961–2970 | 10 | 1899–1900 | |

== Post-Midland Railway ==
All 55 passed to the London, Midland and Scottish Railway (LMS) at the 1923 grouping in 1923. Withdrawals started in 1930, and by 1948, when the railways were nationalised, 23 locomotives passed into British Railways ownership, and were allocated numbers 40000 higher than their LMS numbers, although 5 were withdrawn before the new numbers were applied. Withdrawals continued and the last example, 41875, was taken withdrawn in July 1963. All were scrapped.

Table of withdrawals
| Year | Quantity in service at start of year | Quantity withdrawn | Locomotive numbers | Notes |
|---|---|---|---|---|
| 1930 | 55 | 6 | 1861/66-67/81/97/99 | |
| 1931 | 49 | 4 | 1858/62/82/86 | |
| 1932 | 45 | 10 | 1845/48/68/72/80/83/87-88/96/98 | |
| 1933 | 35 | 4 | 1863/77/92/94 | |
| 1934–37 | 31 | 0 | – | |
| 1938 | 31 | 1 | 1849 | |
| 1939 | 30 | 1 | 1851 | |
| 1940–45 | 31 | 0 | – | |
| 1946 | 29 | 3 | 1864/71/76 | |
| 1947 | 26 | 3 | 1850/84/91 | |
| 1948 | 23 | 2 | 1870/93 | |
| 1949 | 21 | 1 | 1874 | |
| 1950 | 20 | 2 | 1895, 41873 | |
| 1951 | 18 | 3 | 1856, 41852/54 | |
| 1952 | 15 | 1 | 41890 | |
| 1953 | 14 | 2 | 41846/49 | |
| 1954 | 12 | 1 | 41853 | |
| 1955 | 11 | 3 | 41859/65/89 | |
| 1956 | 8 | 1 | 41885 | |
| 1957 | 7 | 1 | 41860 | |
| 1958 | 6 | 0 | – | |
| 1959 | 6 | 2 | 41857/78 | |
| 1960 | 4 | 3 | 41847/55/79 | |
| 1961–62 | 1 | 0 | – | |
| 1963 | 1 | 1 | 41875 | |
