= LMS Stanier Class 2 0-4-4T =

Class of passenger locomotives

LMS Stanier 0-4-4T
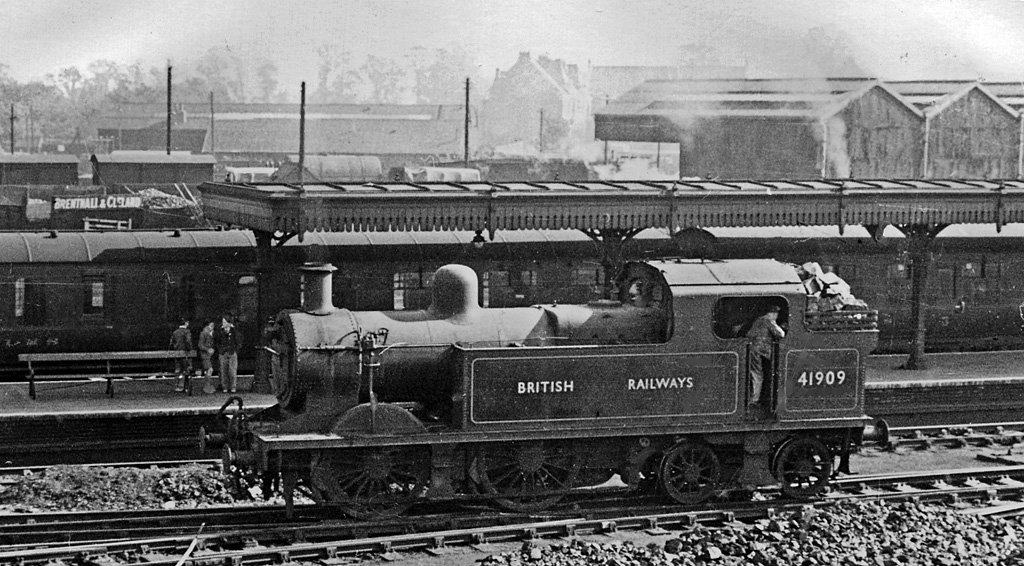
- Push-pull fitted 41909 at Watford Junction in October 1948
Type and origin
- Power type: Steam
- Designer: William Stanier
- Builder: LMS Derby Works
- Build date: 1932–1933
- Total produced: 10
Specifications
- Configuration
  - Whyte: 0-4-4T
  - UIC: B2′ n2t
- Gauge: 4 ft 8 1/2 in (1,435 mm) standard gauge
- Driver dia.: 5 ft 7 in (1.702 m)
- Trailing dia.: 3 ft 3 1/2 in (1.003 m)
- Length: 35 ft 3 in (10.74 m)
- Loco weight: 58.05 long tons (58.98 t; 65.02 short tons)
- Fuel type: Coal
- Fuel capacity: 3 long tons (3.05 t; 3.36 short tons)
- Water cap.: 1,350 imp gal (6,100 L; 1,620 US gal)
- Firebox
  - Grate area: 17 1/2 sq ft (1.63 m^{2})
- Boiler: LMS type G6
- Boiler pressure: 160 lbf/in^{2} (1.1 MPa)
- Heating surface
  - Firebox: 104 sq ft (9.7 m^{2})
  - Tubes: 902 sq ft (83.8 m^{2})
- Superheater: None
- Cylinders: Two, inside
- Cylinder size: 18 in × 26 in (457 mm × 660 mm)
- Valve gear: Stephenson
- Valve type: Slide valves
Performance figures
- Tractive effort: 17,100 lbf (76.06 kN)
Career
- Operators: London, Midland and Scottish Railway; → British Railways
- Power class: 2P
- Numbers: LMS: 6400–6409; LMS: 1900–1909 from 1946; BR: 41900–41909
- Withdrawn: 1959 (9), 1962 (1)
- Disposition: All scrapped

The London, Midland and Scottish Railway (LMS) Stanier Class 2 0-4-4T was a class of 10 light passenger locomotives built in 1932. Ostensibly designed under new Chief Mechanical Engineer (CME) William Stanier, they were in fact the last new design of the Midland Railway's school of engineering.

Design work began in 1930, in the final year of Henry Fowler's term as CME: on 1 January 1931, Ernest Lemon replaced Fowler as CME. The 1931 Locomotive Building Programme was approved by the LMS board on 28 January 1931, and comprised 135 locomotives of six different types; the programme included ten 0-4-4T to be built at Derby. Upon taking over as CME from Lemon on 1 January 1932, Stanier found that design work was largely complete, and that an order for ten had been placed. He was able to affect certain design modifications.

Second-hand boilers, of Midland Railway Class G6 (Belpaire firebox, six feet long) were used, taken from the stock of spare boilers at Derby works. These had been taken from locomotives that had been withdrawn due to the age or general condition of the locomotive, but reasonably-new boilers in good condition were stored for possible reuse instead of being scrapped with the rest of the locomotive. Those selected in June 1932 for the new 0-4-4T were between three and five years old at the time; the locomotives previously carrying them had been withdrawn between 1928 and 1931.

== Overview ==
The Midland Railway had a large number of 1P 0-4-4T of several classes and this was a larger version of the larger wheeled design, the 1252 Class, classified 2P. The ten built were numbered 6400–6409 by the LMS and renumbered 1900–1909 shortly before nationalisation, freeing the numbers for new LMS Ivatt Class 2 2-6-0s. British Railways adding 40000 to their numbers making them 41900–41909. Although the last new Midland-style design, as subsequent Stanier engines incorporated much Great Western Railway practice, they were not the last MR-designed locomotives built with some 4Fs appearing as late as 1940.

The class was originally built with stovepipe chimneys, apparently due to an oversight by Stanier due to the design for future LMS locomotive chimneys not being finalised. All were later fitted with Stanier chimneys.

Two of the locomotives were fitted with vacuum control gear in 1934 for working the motor trains on the St Alban's branch, and allocated to Watford Junction shed. The remainder were fitted in the BR period and used at a number of different sheds including Warwick and Longsight. (Motor trains was the terminology used by the LMS although they later became popularly referred to as push-pull trains. The suitably modified stock was marked as pull-push).

== Details ==
LMS 1932/3 No.	LMS 1946 No.	BR No.	Date built	Date motor gear fitted	Withdrawn
6400	1900	41900	December 1932	September 1950	March 1962
6401	1901	41901	December 1932	February 1951	November 1959
6402	1902	41902	December 1932	September 1950	November 1959
6403	1903	41903	December 1932	September 1950	November 1959
6404	1904	41904	December 1932	September 1950	November 1959
6405	1905	41905	November 1932	January 1951	November 1959
6406	1906	41906	December 1932	March 1957	November 1959
6407	1907	41907	December 1932	March 1951	November 1959
6408	1908	41908	December 1932	July 1934	November 1959
6409	1909	41909	January 1933	March 1934	November 1959

== Withdrawal ==
All were withdrawn in November 1959 except 41900, which was withdrawn in March 1962. None were preserved.
