= Midland Railway 1134A Class =

Midland Railway 1134A class
Type and origin
- Power type: Steam
- Builder: Derby Works
- Order number: 1552, 2514
- Build date: 1897–1903
- Total produced: 10
Specifications
- Configuration
  - Whyte: 0-4-0ST
  - UIC: B n2t
- Gauge: 4 ft 8 1/2 in (1,435 mm)
- Driver dia.: 3 ft 9 1/2 in (1.156 m)
- Wheelbase: 7 ft 6 in (2.286 m)
- Loco weight: 30 long tons 19 cwt (31.4 t)
- Fuel type: Coal
- Boiler
  - Model: Midland Railway Class J1
  - Diameter: 3 ft 8 in (1.118 m)
  - Tube plates: 10 ft 4 in (3.150 m)
- Boiler pressure: 150 lbf/in^{2} (1.03 MPa)
- Heating surface: 764 sq ft (71.0 m^{2})
- Cylinders: Two
- Cylinder size: 15 in × 20 in (381 mm × 508 mm)
Career
- Operators: Midland Railway; London, Midland and Scottish Railway; London Midland Region of British Rail
- Numbers: New: 1134A–1143A; 1907: 1518–1527
- Withdrawn: 1922–1932, 1955–1958

The Midland Railway 1134A Class was a class of 0-4-0ST steam locomotives. They were a development of the preceding 1116A Class, but were generally larger in most dimensions. The subsequent 1528 Class was effectively a side tank version of this class.

Five were built in 1897 and five in 1903, all at Derby Works. Their original numbers were 1134A–1143A, i.e. all of them on the duplicate list. Their 1907 numbers were 1518–1527. Seven passed to the London, Midland and Scottish Railway (LMS) in 1923, and two were inherited by British Railways in 1948, numbers 1518 and 1523. These became BR 41518 and 41523. 41523 was withdrawn in 1955 and 41518 was the last withdrawn in 1958, having been a shunter at Staveley Ironworks. None were preserved.

Table of withdrawals
Year	Quantity in service at start of year	Quantity withdrawn	Locomotive numbers	Notes
1922	10	3	1521, 1526, 1527	
1928	7	4	1519, 1520, 1522, 1525	
1932	3	1	1524	sold to Grassmoor Colliery
1955	2	1	41523	
1958	1	1	41518	
