= Midland Railway 2501 Class =

Class of 30 British 2-6-0 locomotives

Midland Railway 2501 class
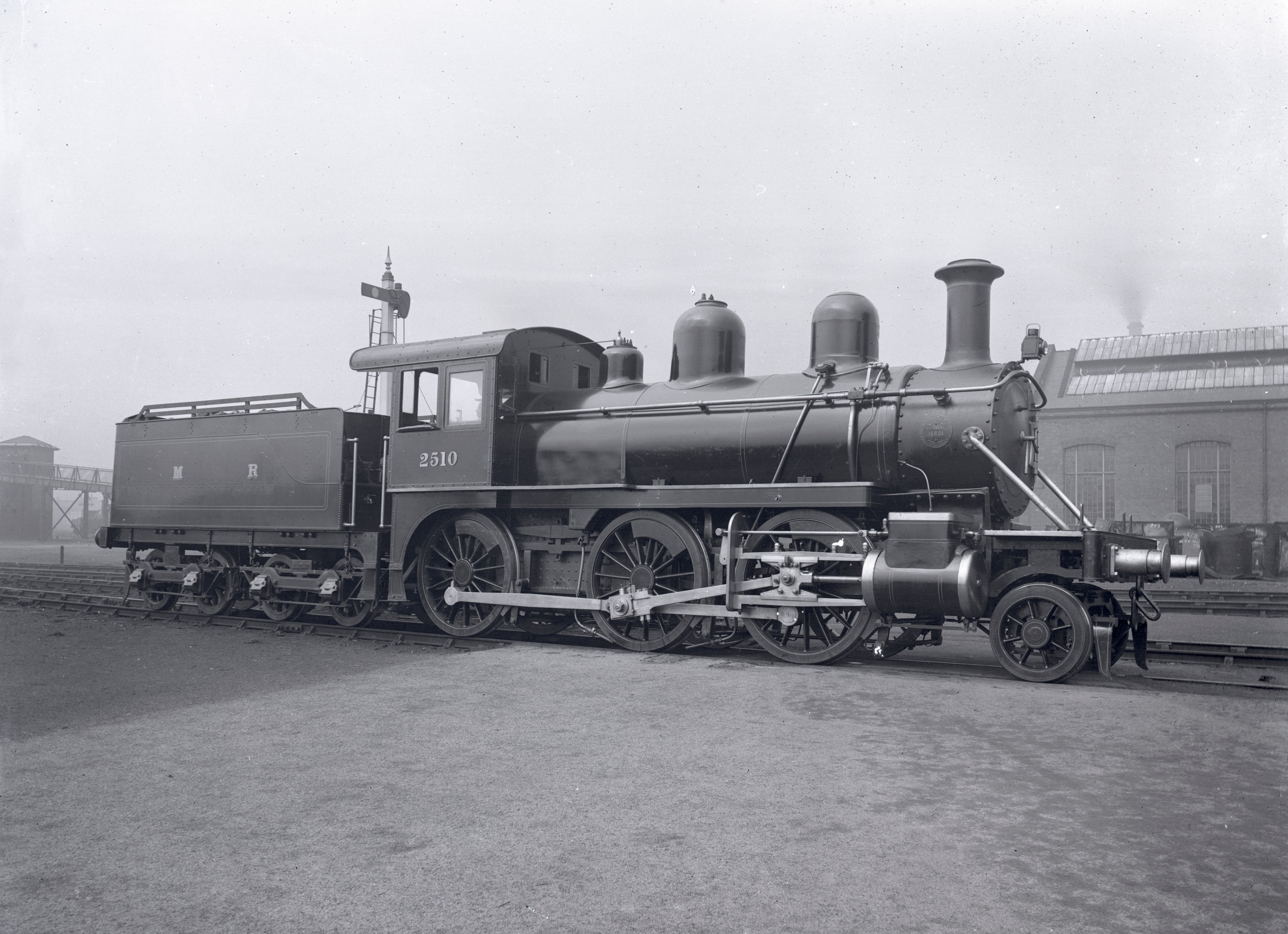
- Midland Railway No. 2510
Type and origin
- Power type: Steam
- Builder: Baldwin Locomotive Works
- Serial number: 16621–16630, 16844–16853, 16960–16965, 16984–16987
- Build date: 1899
- Total produced: 30
Specifications
- Configuration
  - Whyte: 2-6-0
  - UIC: 1′Cn2
- Gauge: 4 ft 8 1/2 in (1,435 mm)
- Leading dia.: 2 ft 9 1/4 in (845 mm)
- Driver dia.: 5 ft 0 1/4 in (1,530 mm)
- Length: over buffers: 51 ft 6 1/4 in (15.70 m)
- Axle load: 13 long tons 7 cwt (29,900 lb or 13.6 t)
- Adhesive weight: 38 long tons 0.75 cwt (85,200 lb or 38.6 t)
- Loco weight: 45 long tons 16.25 cwt (102,600 lb or 46.5 t)
- Tender weight: 34 long tons 12.5 cwt (77,600 lb or 35.2 t)
- Tender type: Two two-axle bogies
- Fuel type: Coal
- Boiler pressure: 160 lbf/in^{2} (1.10 MPa)
- Cylinders: Two, outside
- Cylinder size: 18 in × 24 in (457 mm × 610 mm)
- Valve gear: Stephenson, inside
- Valve type: Slide valves
Performance figures
- Tractive effort: 17,626 lbf (78.40 kN)
Career
- Operators: Midland Railway
- Class: 2501
- Numbers: New: 2501–2510, 2521–2540; 1907: 2200–2229
- Delivered: 1899
- Withdrawn: 1908–1914
- Disposition: All scrapped

The Midland Railway 2501 Class was a class of 2-6-0 steam locomotives built in the United States in 1899. The Midland's own Derby Works had reached their capacity, and were unable to produce additional engines at the time, and many British locomotive builders were recovering from a labor dispute over working hours, thus the railway placed an order with the Baldwin Locomotive Works for 30 engines. These engines were manufactured in four batches and shipped disassembled as kits of parts, before being re-assembled at Derby. Baldwin constructed similar 2-6-0's for the Great Central Railway (GCR Class 15) and Great Northern Railway (GNR Class H1) around the same time.

== Appearance ==
The engines were designed with little or no consideration to British practice, having several distinct characteristics of American practice, such as the use of bar frames, sand carried in a second dome on top of the boiler, and eight-wheel bogie tenders. A further 10 engines were ordered from the Schenectady Locomotive Works, which became the 2511 Class.

== Numbering ==
Originally Nos 2501–2510, 2521–2540, in the Midland's 1907 renumbering scheme, the Baldwins became Nos 2200–2229, in the same order.

== Withdrawal ==
Being non-standard, they had a short life and were all withdrawn between November 1908 and March 1914. All were scrapped.

Table of withdrawals
Year	Quantity in service at start of year	Quantity withdrawn	Locomotive numbers	Notes
1908	30	1	2209	
1909	29	8	2212, 2215, 2219–2221, 2225, 2226, 2229	
1910	21	3	2203, 2204, 2207	
1911	18	3	2200, 2202, 2208	
1912	15	2	2227, 2228	
1913	13	10	2201, 2205, 2206, 2211, 2213, 2216–2218, 2222, 2224	
1914	3	3	2210, 2214, 2223	

== See also ==
- Locomotives of the Midland Railway
