= Midland Railway 1322 Class =

Midland Railway 1322 class
Type and origin
- Power type: Steam
- Builder: MR Derby Works
- Order number: 341 (5), 816 (5)
- Build date: 1883 (5), 1889–1890 (5)
- Total produced: 10
Specifications
- Configuration
  - Whyte: 0-4-0ST
  - UIC: B n2t
- Gauge: 4 ft 8 1/2 in (1,435 mm)
- Driver dia.: 3 ft 10 in (1,168 mm)
- Loco weight: 23 long tons 3 cwt (51,900 lb or 23.5 t)
- Fuel type: Coal
- Boiler pressure: 140 psi (0.97 MPa)
- Cylinders: Two
- Cylinder size: 13 in × 20 in (330 mm × 508 mm)
- Valve gear: Stephenson
Performance figures
- Tractive effort: 8,744 lbf (38.90 kN)
Career
- Operators: MR » LMS » BR
- Power class: MR: Unclassified
- Withdrawn: 1905, 1907, 1921-28, 1949
- Disposition: All scrapped

The Midland Railway (MR) 1322 Class was a class of small 0-4-0ST steam locomotives designed for shunting. The next class of shunting engines built by the Midland was the 1116A Class, which was nearly identical.

== Numbering ==
Ten engines were built at Derby Works, five in 1883 and the remainder in 1889–1890. Their original numbers were 1322–1326, 202, 1428–1430, 1697. In 1892 they were all placed on the duplicate list as 1322A–1326A, 202A, 1428A–1430A, 1697A.

== Disposal ==
Nos 202A and 1429A were withdrawn before the Midland's 1907 renumbering scheme, leaving the remainder to become 1500–1507. By 1928, all but 1506 had been withdrawn, and in 1930 it was renumbered 1509 to make room for the ex-S&DJR Fox, Walker 0-6-0ST locomotives taken into LMS stock that year. This engine survived, having been transferred to departmental stock in 1924, and used as a works shunter at Derby Works. It was allocated the British Railways number 41509. (Note: Sources are unclear whether it received it however, but this question should be answerable) It was withdrawn and scrapped in November 1949.

Table of withdrawals
Year	Quantity in service at start of year	Quantity withdrawn	Locomotive numbers	Notes
1905	10	1	1429	
1907	9	1	202	
1921	8	1	1501	
1924	7	2	1502, 1505	
1926	5	1	1500	
1927	4	1	1504	
1928	3	2	1503, 1507	
1949	1	1	1509	
