= Midland Railway 990 Class =

Midland Railway 990 class
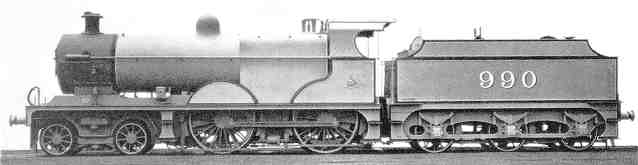
- The official photograph of 990 in photographic grey livery
Type and origin
- Power type: Steam
- Designer: Richard Deeley
- Builder: Derby Works
- Build date: 1907–1909
- Total produced: 10
Specifications
- Configuration
  - Whyte: 4-4-0
  - UIC: 2′B n2, later 2′B h2
- Gauge: 4 ft 8 1/2 in (1,435 mm) standard gauge
- Leading dia.: 3 ft 3 1/2 in (1.003 m)
- Driver dia.: 6 ft 6 1/2 in (1.994 m)
- Loco weight: 58 long tons 5 cwt (130,500 lb or 59.2 t)
- Fuel type: Coal
- Boiler: MR type G9A, later G9AS
- Boiler pressure: 200 lbf/in^{2} (1.38 MPa)
- Cylinders: Two, inside
- Cylinder size: 20 1/2 in × 26 in (521 mm × 660 mm)
- Valve gear: Deeley
Performance figures
- Tractive effort: 23,662 lbf (105.3 kN)
Career
- Operators: Midland Railway; London, Midland and Scottish Railway
- Class: MR: 990
- Power class: 4P
- Numbers: 990–999 (801–809 from 1926)
- Withdrawn: 1925–1929
- Disposition: All scrapped

The Midland Railway 990 class was a class of 4-4-0 steam locomotive with simple expansion. Ten were built by the Midland Railway in 1907–1909. They shared many features with the 1000 class compounds. Initially built as saturated, from 1910 to 1914 they were equipped with superheated boilers. These locomotives were notable for their work north of Leeds, over the difficult Settle and Carlisle route.

== Accidents and incidents ==
- On 2 September 1913, locomotive No. 993 was hauling a stalled express passenger train that was involved in a collision with another express at Ais Gill, Westmorland due to the latter passing signals at danger. The other train was hauled by Midland Railway Class 2 4-4-0 No. 446. 16 people were killed and 38 were injured.

== Withdrawal ==
They passed to the London, Midland and Scottish Railway (LMS) in 1923 and were withdrawn between 1925 and 1929. In 1926, the eight surviving locomotives were renumbered 801 to 809 to free up their old numbers for more compounds. None were preserved, though the first of the compounds was.

Table of withdrawals
Year	Quantity in service at start of year	Quantity withdrawn	Locomotive numbers
1925	10	1	990
1926	9	1	994
1927	8	2	807
1928	6	4	802, 803, 805, 806
1929	2	2	808, 809

== See also ==
- Locomotives of the Midland Railway
