= Midland Railway 2601 Class =

Class of 4-2-2 steam locomotives

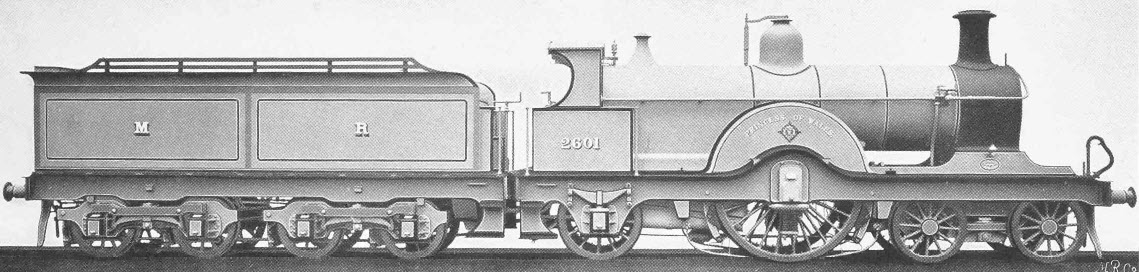
Type and origin
- Power type: Steam
- Designer: Samuel Waite Johnson
- Builder: Derby Works
- Build date: 1899–1900
- Total produced: 10
Specifications
- Configuration
  - Whyte: 4-2-2
  - UIC: 2′A1 n2
- Gauge: 4 ft 8 1/2 in (1,435 mm) standard gauge
- Driver dia.: 7 ft 9 1/2 in (2.37 m)
- Loco weight: 50 long tons 3 cwt (51.0 t)
- Fuel type: Coal
- Boiler: MR type F
- Boiler pressure: 180 lbf/in^{2} (1,200 kPa)
- Cylinders: Two, inside
- Cylinder size: 19 1/2 in × 26 in (500 mm × 660 mm)
- Valve gear: Stephenson
Performance figures
- Tractive effort: 16,131 lbf (71.8 kN)
Career
- Operators: Midland Railway
- Class: 2601 class
- Numbers: New: 2601–2608, 22–23; 1900: 2606-2608 became 19-21; 1907: 685–694
- Withdrawn: 1919–1922
- Disposition: All scrapped

The Midland Railway 2601 class was the last of four classes of 4-2-2 steam locomotives designed by Samuel Johnson for the Midland Railway. They were a development of his 115 class Spinners. (Note: Midland Railway locomotive class numbering was rather arbitrary, not sequential. Johnson's three classes of 4-2-2 were the 1853, 115 and 2601, in that order.)

Only 10 were built at Derby Works, and none were preserved.

== Design ==
=== The resurgence of singles ===
Towards the end of the 19th century, the age of the single-driver locomotive was obsolete because the trains, which had become heavier, required pulling forces that could no longer be provided by a single drive axle. When steam sanding was invented by James Gresham in 1885 this improved the traction of the driving wheels enough that singles were once again a practical design. There was a resurgence of single designs across a number of railways, such as the GWR's Dean Singles, Holden's P43 for the GER and Johnson's 115 class Spinners for the Midland Railway. All of these were used for high-speed passenger services of moderate weight and not usually of the longest distances. This required a locomotive that was powerful, (Note: Power is the product of both speed and tractive effort.) with the ability to run at high speeds, but only modest tractive effort.

Most used double frames and two inside cylinders. Outside frames, and thus double frames, were generally seen as obsolete, (Note: Although some outside frames persisted for slow mineral engines such as the GWR Aberdares.) but this was an issue with coupled wheels and the need for their coupling rods to use outside cranks. For singles, especially inside-cylindered singles, this was an irrelevance. The use of inside cylinders also reduced the rocking couple, (Note: This rocking couple is the unbalanced force from two pistons in anti-parallel, as the pistons move in opposite directions. Any couple would be multiplied by the spacing between the cylinders, which is several times greater for outside cylinders.) which could become a problem for outside-cylindered locomotives with short wheelbases at high speed. By using double frames, Johnson's Spinners had four main axle bearings and thus was not undersized and without continual trouble.

=== 2601 class ===
A few years after the 115s, Johnson followed these with the slightly improved 2601 class. The cylinder sizes remained the same and the driving wheels increased by 1/2 in (13 mm). The only major change was that the slide valves were replaced by piston valves, although the boiler was still unsuperheated.

The boiler was enlarged, with a larger grate area and a small increase in working pressure from 170 to 180 psi (1,172 to 1,241 kPa). The steam dome was now directly above the driving axle, rather than noticeably ahead of it, as on the 115s. By 1900 Johnson was using the new Belpaire firebox design for the 4-4-0 Belpaires, but this firebox was wider than the previous round-topped boiler and there was insufficient space for it between the tall single drivers.

The 6-wheeled tender was replaced with an 8-wheeled bogie design. This provides a further identification feature in photographs between a 115 and a 2601.

== History ==
Between 1887 and 1900, Johnson had no fewer than 95 single locomotives built by the railway's own workshops in Derby, which differed slightly in structural details. They were used on high-quality express trains and reached speeds of up to 90 mph (140 km/h). 2601 Princess of Wales, the first of the class, was exhibited at the Paris Exposition of 1900 and awarded the Grand Prix.

The class was withdrawn between 1919 and 1922, shortly before the Grouping the following year.
