= Midland Railway 2441 Class =

Class of British steam locomotives

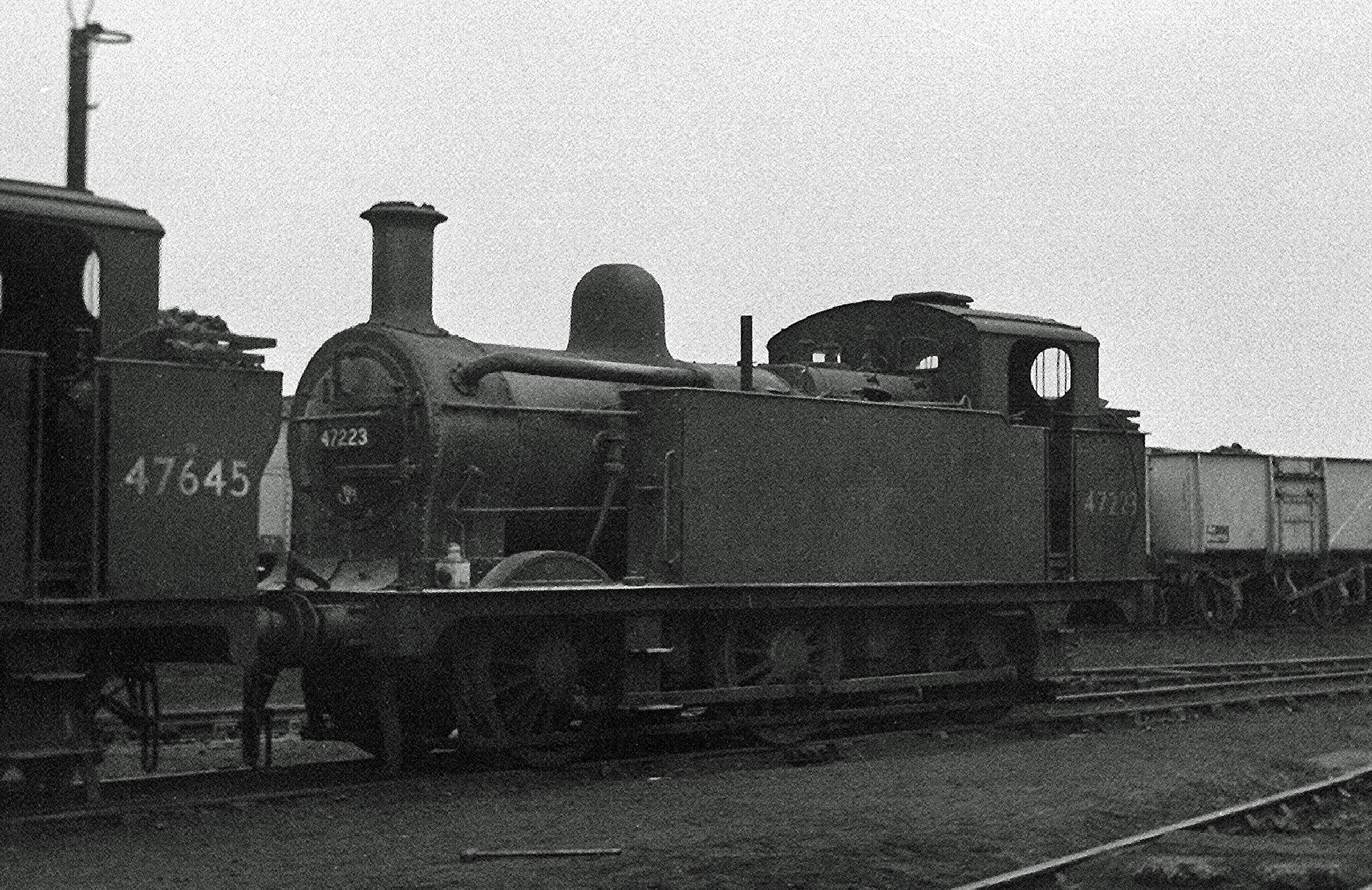
- 47223 at Toton MPD in 1963
Type and origin
- Power type: Steam
- Designer: Samuel Waite Johnson
- Builder: Vulcan Foundry
- Serial number: 1638–1657, 1763–1772, 1783–1812
- Build date: 1899–1902
- Total produced: 60
Specifications
- Configuration
  - Whyte: 0-6-0T
- Gauge: 4 ft 8 1/2 in (1,435 mm) standard gauge
- Driver dia.: 4 ft 7 in (1,397 mm)
- Loco weight: 48 long tons 15 cwt (109,200 lb or 49.5 t); 48 long tons 15 hundredweight (49.5 t; 54.6 short tons)
- Fuel type: Coal
- Water cap.: 1,000 imp gal (4,500 L; 1,200 US gal)
- Boiler pressure: 160 lbf/in^{2} (1.10 MPa)
- Cylinders: Two, inside
- Cylinder size: 18 in × 26 in (457 mm × 660 mm)
- Valve gear: Stephenson, inside
- Valve type: Slide valves
Performance figures
- Tractive effort: 20,835 lbf (92.7 kN)
Career
- Operators: MR » LMS » BR
- Power class: 3F
- Numbers: New: 2441–2460, 2741–2780; 1907: 1900–1959; 1934: 7200–7259; 1948: 47200–47259
- Withdrawn: 1954–1967
- Disposition: All scrapped

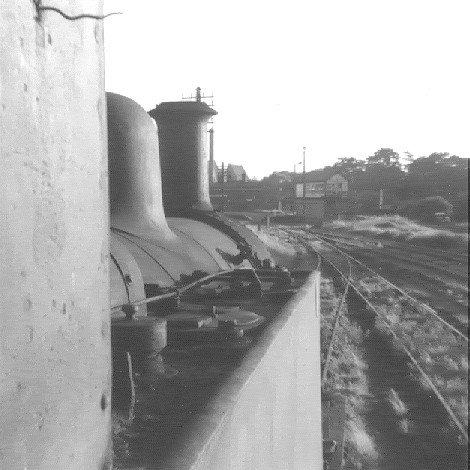
The view from 47231's cab, showing tank top detail, Belpaire firebox, large dome and chimney.

The Midland Railway (MR) 2441 Class was a class of 0-6-0T steam locomotives. They were introduced by Samuel Johnson in 1899, originally with round-topped fireboxes. Henry Fowler later rebuilt them with Belpaire fireboxes. They were given the power classification 3F. The LMS Fowler Class 3F of 1924 was based on this design.

== Numbering ==
Sixty locomotives were built. Initially numbered 2441–2460, 2741–2780; they were renumbered 1900–1959 in the Midland Railway's 1907 renumbering scheme. All passed to the London, Midland and Scottish Railway, initially retaining their MR numbers, before being renumbered 7200–7259 between 1934 and 1937. All passed into British Railways ownership in 1948 and were numbered 47200–47259.

== Withdrawal ==
Withdrawals started in 1954, with three locomotives still in service on 1 January 1966. All were scrapped, though several later LMS locomotives have survived.

Table of withdrawals
Year	Quantity in service at start of year	Quantity withdrawn	Locomotive numbers
1954	60	2	47244–45
1955	58	4	47232/37/52–53
1956	54	4	47215/20/33/56
1957	50	7	47206/22/27/40/42–43/58
1958	43	3	47234/49/51
1959	40	9	47205/08/10/14/16/19/26/46–47
1960	31	5	47203/29/38/41/54
1961	26	8	47200/04/09/12/18/21/39/55
1962	18	5	47213/17/24/35/59
1963	13	2	47225/48
1964	11	7	47207/11/23/28/30/36/57
1965	4	1	47250
1966	3	3	47201–02/31

== Accidents and incidents ==
- On 12 July 1932, locomotive No. 1909 was hauling a freight train that collided with a passenger train that had been derailed by catch points at London King's Cross station. It was also derailed, as were five wagons. There were no injuries.
