= Photographic grey =

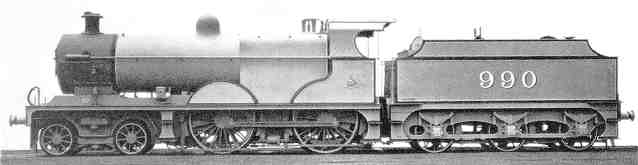
The first of the Midland Railway 990 Class locomotives painted in photographic grey in 1908

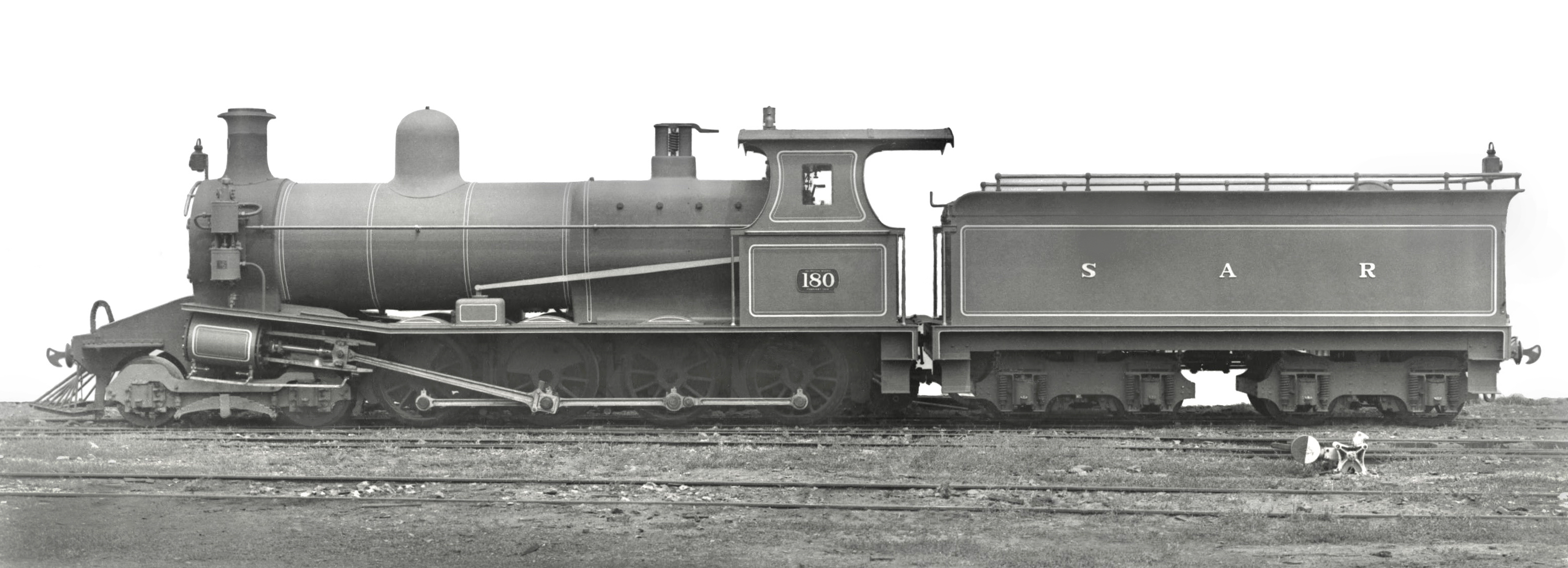
Side-view builder's photo of a South Australian Railways narrow-gauge T class locomotive painted photographic grey in 1903

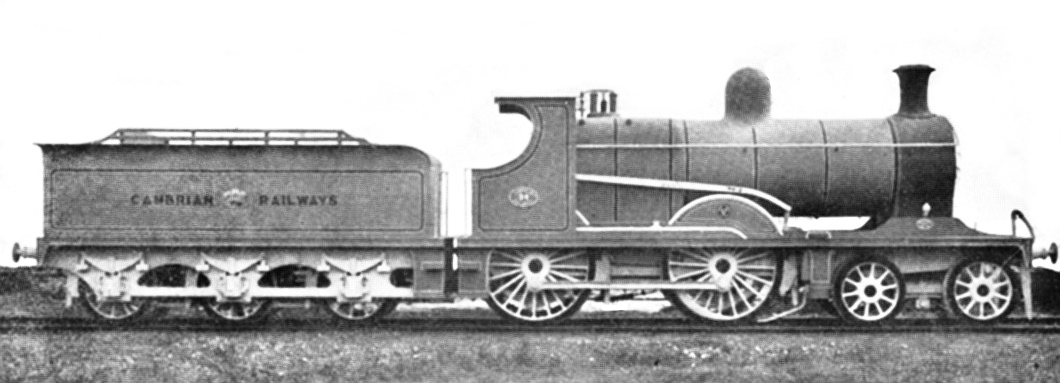
A 94 class locomotive of the Cambrian Railways painted in two shades of photographic grey to further pick out detail and with a variation on the company's livery.

Photographic grey, also known as works grey, was a paint scheme commonly applied to steam locomotives during the period before colour photography became commonplace. It was applied to allow sharper, more detailed images of the locomotive to be recorded. The first photographs of railways and their locomotives were made by private individuals, but by the 1860s the railway companies themselves were keen to create official photographs of the highest quality possible of their latest designs, which led to the adoption of photographic grey in railway photography.

== Use ==
Railway companies wished to record their latest locomotives for use in publicity material and advertisements, and as a technical record of their work. This was especially the case in the United Kingdom, where all but the smallest of the 'pre-grouping' companies owned their own locomotive works and designed and built their own railway engines. For the numerous private locomotive builders it was especially important to have high-quality photographs of their latest builds to showcase to potential customers. Existing customers had also been promised photographs as part of the documentation package for their new locomotives, and this could include such specific instructions as having a bowler-hatted man precisely six feet tall standing alongside, as a scale measure. The practice of taking extensive photographs of locomotives by their makers seems to have developed first by Beyer, Peacock & Company in Manchester from 1856, by the local photographer James Mudd. Mudd also developed the practice of 'whiting out' large areas of distracting backgrounds, by painting over them on the negative.

Most British railway companies used dark green or red liveries, with virtually all goods locomotives painted all-over black to reduce the need for regular and time-consuming cleaning. These dark colours provided poor levels of detail with the glass-plate camera technology of the time, especially when the camera was placed at a suitable distance to cover the entire locomotive in one shot. Early film emulsions were orthochromatic, insensitive to red light, and so the many red or reddish liveries would appear an indistinct black.

The solution was to paint the entire locomotive a mid-grey (usually approximate to the modern shade of slate grey). This light colour reproduced well on the photographic plates and picked out the shadows and shading produced by the various components (such as the valve gear and wheel spokes) allowing them to be recorded in detail. Often a variant of the company's standard livery (such as the lining or company name and crest) would be applied in a darker shade of grey to complete the picture's use for publicity.

To add to the detail recorded, once the negative had been processed the background behind the locomotive would often be inked out to provide a crisp view of the outline and shape.

Works grey also served the function of being a primary undercoat of paint, allowing the locomotive to be used for test runs and checks to find any faults or required modifications before undergoing the expensive and often time-consuming process of being painted in its full livery.

== Decline ==
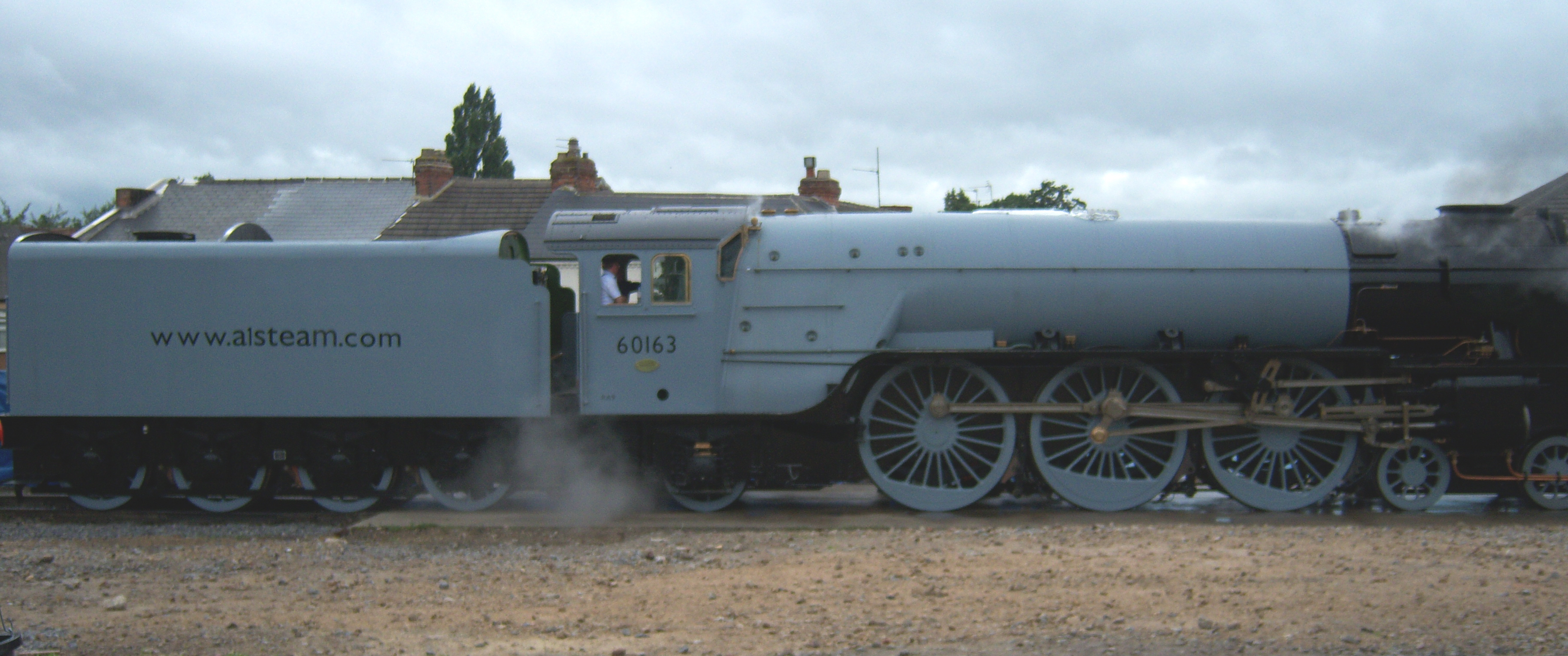
Newly built 60163 Tornado in works grey paint in 2008

When photographic film of a suitable sensitivity became commonplace in the 1920s the use of photographic grey for railway photography began to decline, as photographs could record suitable levels of detail on a locomotive as well as a shining, freshly applied company livery. With colour photography, the exact opposite of photographic grey was used. Locomotives were painted in colour schemes that would grab the attention of those seeing them in colour photographs and in films, which led to brightly coloured prototype diesel locomotives in the 1950s and 1960s such as the British Rail DP1 and HS 4000 Kestrel.

In 2008, when the newly built Peppercorn Class A1 steam locomotive Tornado was completed, it was painted in photographic grey. This was not primarily for photographic reasons, but to allow the testing and checking of the locomotive and also to continue the tradition of new locomotives being unveiled in works grey. Following the completion of tests, Tornado was painted in an official livery of British Railways apple green in December 2008.

== Other uses ==
Objects other than locomotives have been painted in photographic grey in order to allow the maximum amount of detail to be recorded. The White Star Line's third Olympic-class ocean liner, the Britannic was painted photographic grey during her construction and for her launch. The first ship of the class, the Olympic, had been painted all-over white for her launch to produce the same effect.
