= Midland Railway 1528 Class =

Midland Railway 1528 class
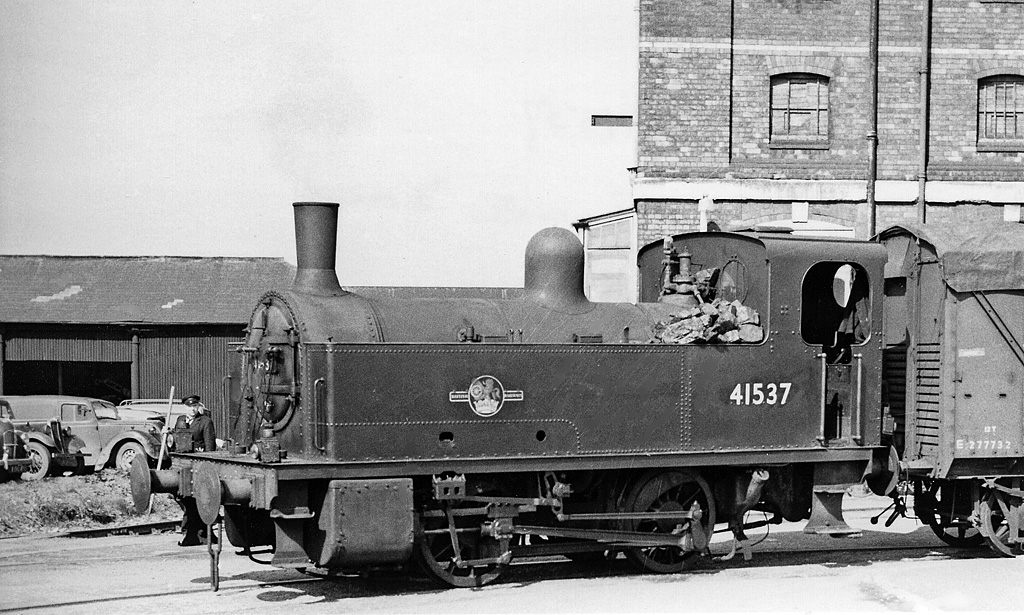
- 41537 in Gloucester Docks, April 1959
Type and origin
- Power type: Steam
- Designer: Richard Deeley
- Builder: Derby Works
- Build date: 1907, 1921–22
- Total produced: 10
Specifications
- Configuration
  - Whyte: 0-4-0T
  - UIC: B n2t
- Gauge: 4 ft 8 1/2 in (1,435 mm) standard gauge
- Driver dia.: 3 ft 9 3/4 in (1.162 m)
- Wheelbase: 7 ft 6 in (2.29 m)
- Loco weight: 32 long tons 16 cwt (73,500 lb or 33.3 t)
- Fuel type: Coal
- Boiler: MR type J2
- Boiler pressure: 160 lbf/in^{2} (1.10 MPa)
- Cylinders: Two, outside
- Cylinder size: 15 in × 22 in (381 mm × 559 mm)
- Valve gear: Walschaerts
Performance figures
- Tractive effort: 14,635 lbf (65.10 kN)
Career
- Operators: MR » LMS » BR
- Power class: Unclassified
- Withdrawn: 1957–1966
- Disposition: All scrapped

The Midland Railway 1528 class was a class of ten small 0-4-0T steam locomotives designed for shunting. They all remained in service until 1957, when withdrawals began, the last being withdrawn in 1966.

== Construction history ==
Ten were built in two batches; all at the Midland Railway's Derby Works: the first five, Nos 1528–1533, in 1907 on Derby order number 3031, and the second five, 1534–1537, in 1921–1922, with only minor detail differences between the batches.

== Service history ==
They all passed to the London, Midland and Scottish Railway at the grouping in 1923, keeping their Midland Railway numbers.

After nationalisation in 1948, British Railways added 40000 to their numbers to become 41528–41537.

Table of withdrawals
Year	Quantity in service at start of year	Quantity withdrawn	Locomotive numbers
1957	10	2	41530/34
1961	8	3	41529/32/36
1962	5	0	–
1963	5	2	41531/37
1964	3	1	41535
1965	2	0	–
1966	2	2	41528/33

None have survived to preservation.
