= Midland Railway 1116A Class =

Midland Railway 1116A class
Type and origin
- Power type: Steam
- Builder: MR Derby Works
- Order number: 1162 (5), 1534 (5)
- Build date: 1893 (5), 1897 (5)
- Total produced: 10
Specifications
- Configuration
  - Whyte: 0-4-0ST
  - UIC: B n2t
- Gauge: 4 ft 8 1/2 in (1,435 mm) standard gauge
- Driver dia.: 3 ft 10 in (1,168 mm)
- Loco weight: 23 long tons 3 cwt (51,900 lb or 23.5 t)
- Fuel type: Coal
- Boiler pressure: 140 psi (0.97 MPa)
- Cylinders: Two
- Cylinder size: 13 in × 20 in (330 mm × 508 mm)
- Valve gear: Stephenson
Performance figures
- Tractive effort: 8,744 lbf (38.90 kN)
Career
- Operators: Midland Railway; London, Midland and Scottish Railway; British Railways
- Power class: MR: Unclassified
- Withdrawn: 1921–1936, 1955
- Disposition: All scrapped

The Midland Railway 1116A Class was a class of 0-4-0ST for shunting. Ten were built at Derby in the 1890s, five in 1893 and five in 1897. They were closely related to the 1322 and 1134A classes.

== Construction history ==
The ten locomotives were built at Derby Works in two batches of 5 each in 1893 and 1897. They were numbered initially as 1116A–1120A, 2359–2360 and 1131A–1133A, the A suffix indicating the duplicate list. They were renumbered as 1508–1517 in 1907.

== Disposal ==
All were still in service at the Midland's 1907 renumbering. The first locomotive was withdrawn in 1921, leaving nine to pass to the LMS at the 1923 grouping. All but one were withdrawn by 1936, with the survivor being retired in 1955, having been renumbered 41516 by British Railways. All members of the class were scrapped.

Table of withdrawals
Year	Quantity in service at start of year	Quantity withdrawn	Locomotive numbers	Notes
1921	10	1	1512	
1925	9	3	1509, 1513, 1517	
1926	6	2	1508, 1515	
1928	4	1	1511	Sold to Pentrich Colliery
1930	3	1	1514	
1936	2	1	1510	
1955	1	1	41516	
