= Midland Railway 6 Class =

Midland Railway 6 class
Type and origin
- Power type: Steam
- Designer: S. W. Johnson
- Builder: Derby Works
- Order number: 1
- Build date: 1875
- Total produced: 10
Specifications
- Configuration
  - Whyte: 0-4-4T
  - UIC: B2′ n2t
- Gauge: 4 ft 8 1/2 in (1,435 mm)
- Driver dia.: 5 ft 3 in (1.600 m)
- Trailing dia.: 3 ft 0 in (0.914 m)
- Wheelbase
  - Engine: 8 feet 9 inches (2.667 m) +; 9 feet 9 inches (2.972 m) +; 5 feet 0 inches (1.524 m)
- Loco weight: 43 long tons 6 cwt (44.0 t)
- Fuel type: Coal
- Boiler
  - Model: Midland Railway Class C
  - Diameter: 4 ft 1 in (1.245 m)
  - Tube plates: 10 ft 6 in (3.200 m)
- Boiler pressure: 160 lbf/in^{2} (1.10 MPa)
- Heating surface: 1,254 sq ft (116.5 m^{2})
- Cylinders: Two, inside
- Cylinder size: 17 in × 24 in (432 mm × 610 mm)
Career
- Operators: Midland Railway; London, Midland and Scottish Railway
- Withdrawn: 1925–1935

The Midland Railway 6 Class was a class of ten 0-4-4T steam locomotives. They were built at Derby Works in 1875. A development of the earlier 0-4-4WT of the 690 and 780 classes, the first Johnson engines had side tanks instead of back tanks.

The original Midland Railway (MR) numbers were 6, 15, 18, 137, 140–144, and 147. The 1907 numbers were 1226–1235. All passed to the LMS in 1923, but they were all withdrawn and scrapped by 1935.

An abortive attempt was made to preserve the first of the class (No. 1226, which was withdrawn in 1930) and repainted back into its original livery and renumbered it as 6. However, the new Chief Mechanical Engineer, William Stanier, ordered it scrapped in 1932.

Table of withdrawals
Year	Quantity in service at start of year	Quantity withdrawn	Locomotive numbers	Notes
1925	10	1	1233	
1926	9	1	1232	
1927	8	1	1231	
1928	7	3	1227, 1228, 1230	
1930	4	3	1226, 1229, 1234	
1935	1	1	1235	
