= 0-4-4T =

Tank locomotive wheel arrangement

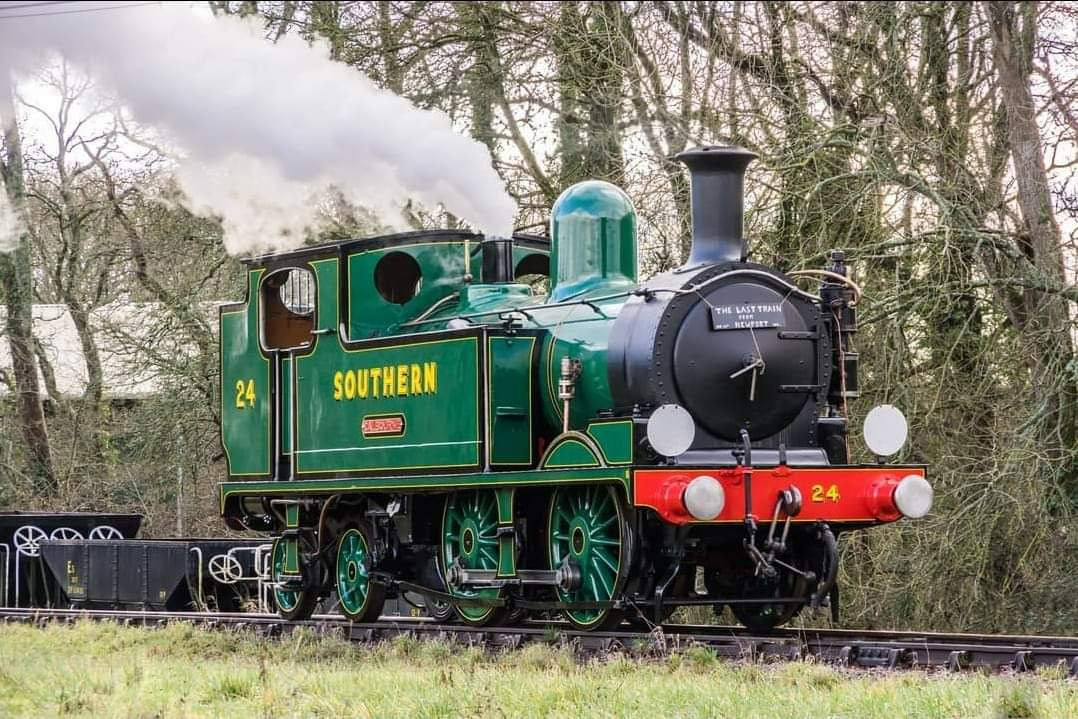
British LSWR O2 class 0-4-4T

Under the Whyte notation for the classification of steam locomotives, 0-4-4 represents the wheel arrangement of no leading wheels, four powered and coupled driving wheels on two axles, and four trailing wheels on two axles. This type was only used for tank locomotives.

In the UK 0-4-4 tanks were mainly used for suburban or rural passenger duties. In America, the wheel arrangement became known as the Forney, after a specific design of 0-4-4s, the Forney locomotive, became heavily used on the narrow curves of elevated railways and other rapid transit lines.

== Equivalent classifications ==
Other equivalent classifications are:

- UIC classification: B2 (also known as German classification and Italian classification)
- French classification: 022
- Turkish classification: 24
- Swiss classification: 2/4
- Russian classification: 0-2-2

== History ==
=== Finland ===
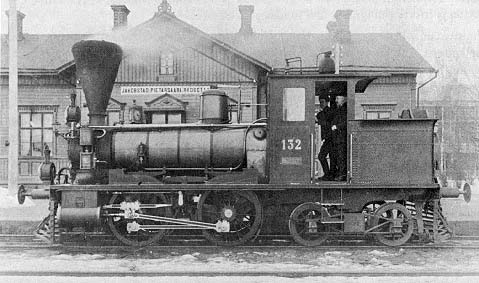
Finnish Steam Locomotive Class F1 No 132, made by the SLM, Winterthur, Switzerland in 1886, and it was used on the Finnish State Railways in 1886-1932. It is preserved at the Finnish Railway Museum.

The Finnish Steam Locomotive Class F1 entered service with SVR in 1885 were used until 1935. One example is preserved at the Finnish Railway Museum.

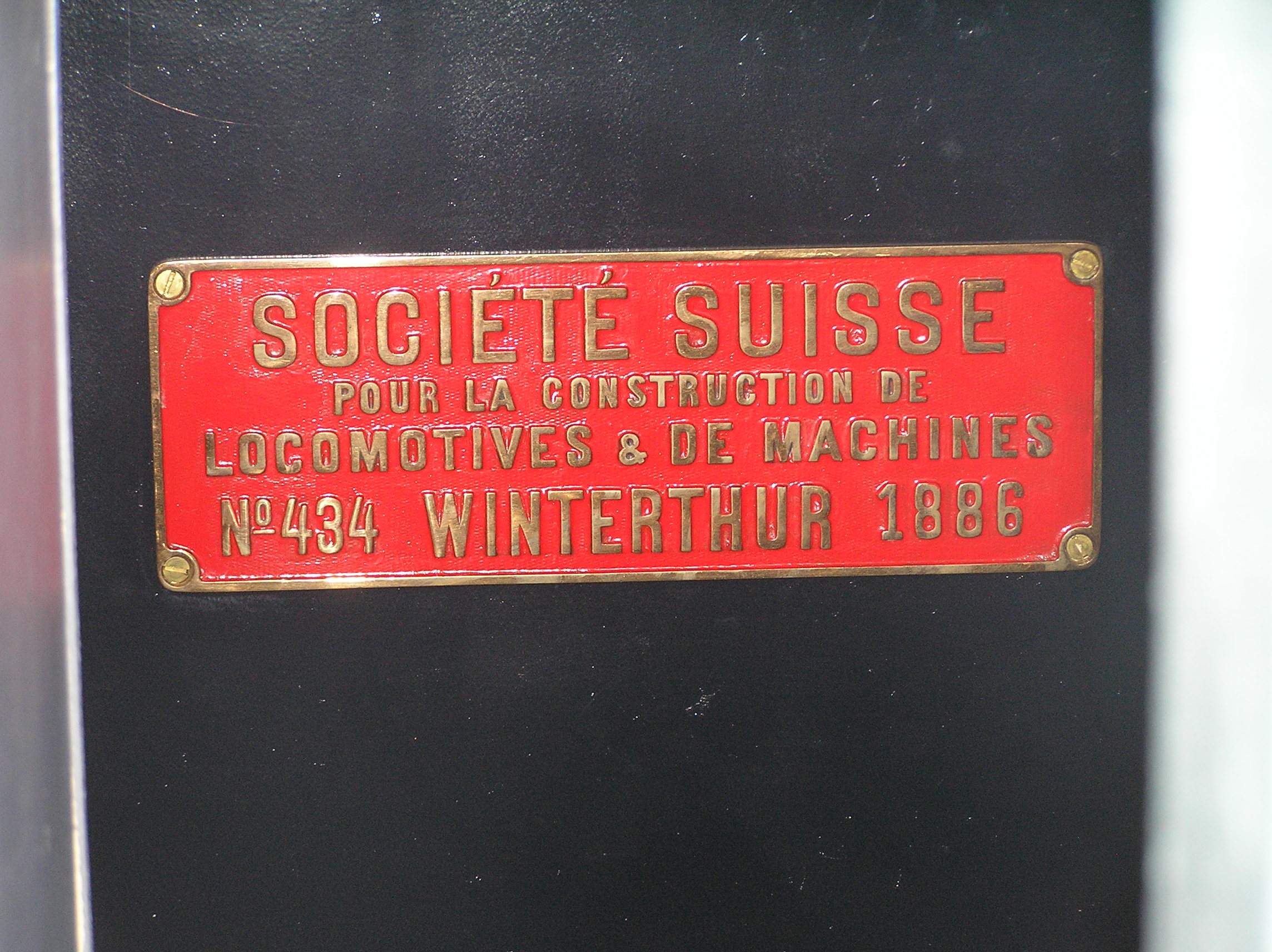
Builder's plate of Swiss Locomotive and Machine Works Societe Suisse locomotive No 434 of 1886 0-4-4T at the Finnish Railway Museum

=== United Kingdom ===
The earliest 0-4-4's in the UK were well tanks. Both John Chester Craven of the London Brighton and South Coast Railway and James Cudworth of the South Eastern Railway (UK) introduced classes in 1866. They were followed by Matthew Kirtley on the Midland Railway (690 Class and 780 Class, 26 locomotive built 1869-70) and Patrick Stirling on the Great Northern Railway (48 locomotive built 1873-81).

The more common side-tank version was introduced on the Great Eastern Railway by Samuel Waite Johnson in 1872, and was soon afterwards adopted by most mainline railways in the UK, becoming the standard configuration for a passenger tank locomotive until about 1900. Examples have included the LSWR O2 and M7 classes, the Midland Railway 2228 Class, and the Caledonian Railway 439 Class. The last British design of 0-4-4T were the LMS Stanier Class 2 0-4-4T of 1932, based on the 2228 Class.

Preserved 0-4-4T locomotives in the UK are SECR H class No. 263 on the Bluebell Railway, O2 class No. W24 'Calbourne' on the Isle of Wight Steam Railway, LSWR M7 Class Nos. 245 in the National Railway Museum and 53 (as BR 30053) on the Swanage Railway, Metropolitan Railway E Class No. 1 at the Buckinghamshire Railway Centre, CR No.419 by the Scottish Railway Preservation Society and the Duke of Sutherland's 'Dunrobin' which was brought back from Canada by Beamish Museum. The Class G5 Locomotive Company Limited are recreating a replica NER Class O (LNER class G5).

=== United States ===
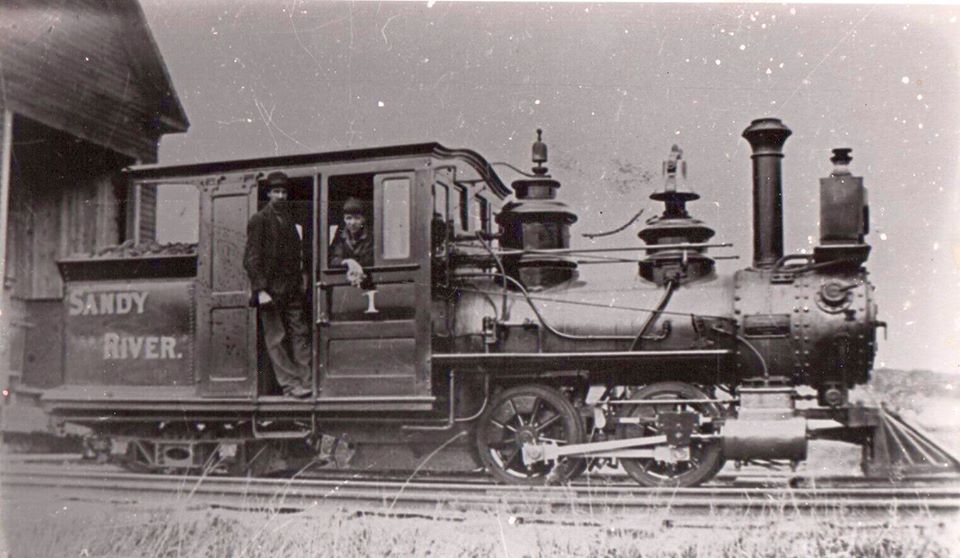
Sandy River Railroad Forney locomotive 1

The 0-4-4 configuration appears to have been introduced in the US, with the Forney locomotive, was patented by Matthias N. Forney between 1861 and 1864. These were characterized by a single frame under the boiler and fuel/water tank, which is supported at the rear by the truck under the coal bunker/water tank. The locomotives were designed to run cab (or bunker) first and were built for commuter lines in cities such as New York, Chicago and Boston.
