= NER Class M =

NER Class M refers to two classes of steam locomotive of the North Eastern Railway:

- NER Class M, later NER Class 3CC
- NER Class M, formerly NER Class M1
