= Class 483 =

Class 483 may refer to:

- British Rail Class 483
- DBAG Class 483
- Midland Railway 483 Class
