= Richard Deeley =

English engineer

- Born: 24 October 1855
- Died: 19 June 1944 (aged 88); Isleworth, London

Richard Mountford Deeley (24 October 1855 – 19 June 1944) was an English engineer, chiefly noted for his five years as Chief Mechanical Engineer (CME) of the Midland Railway. Richard Deeley is recorded as being born in Derby His father had been an accountant with the Midland Railway and Richard attended grammar school in Chester.

== Career ==
In 1873 he became a pupil of B. Ellington at the Hydraulic Engineering Co in Chester, and two years later he became a pupil of Samuel Waite Johnson at Derby Works. In March 1890 he became chief of the testing department at Derby, then progressed to the position of Inspector of Boilers, Engines and Machinery (March 1893), and to Derby Works Manager in January 1902, adding the post of Electrical Engineer a year later. In July 1903 he also became Assistant Locomotive Superintendent, subsequently replacing Johnson as Locomotive Superintendent on 1 January 1904.

== Compound locomotives ==
He made significant contributions to compounding, adopting Smith's system for his Midland Compound 4-4-0 locomotives. However, the refusal of the company's board to sanction development of larger locomotives, and friction with the new senior managers, led him to resign his post at the end of 1909. After this he continued to work and publish on engineering problems in both railway and non-railway applications.

== Patents ==
- GB190516372, published 28 June 1906, Improvements in valve gear for locomotives or similar coupled steam engines
- GB190604729, published 31 January 1907, Improvements in locomotive superheaters
- GB190605839, published 7 March 1907, Combined spark arrester and ash ejector for locomotive engines
- GB190910561, published 30 September 1909, Improvements in locomotive boiler stays and the like
- GB190923872 (with Walter Reuben Preston), published 13 October 1910, Improvements in slide valves for motive power engines

Preceded by Samuel Waite Johnson	Chief Mechanical Engineer of the Midland Railway; 1904 – 1909	Succeeded by Henry Fowler
