= Midland Railway 1000 Class =

Steam locomotive class

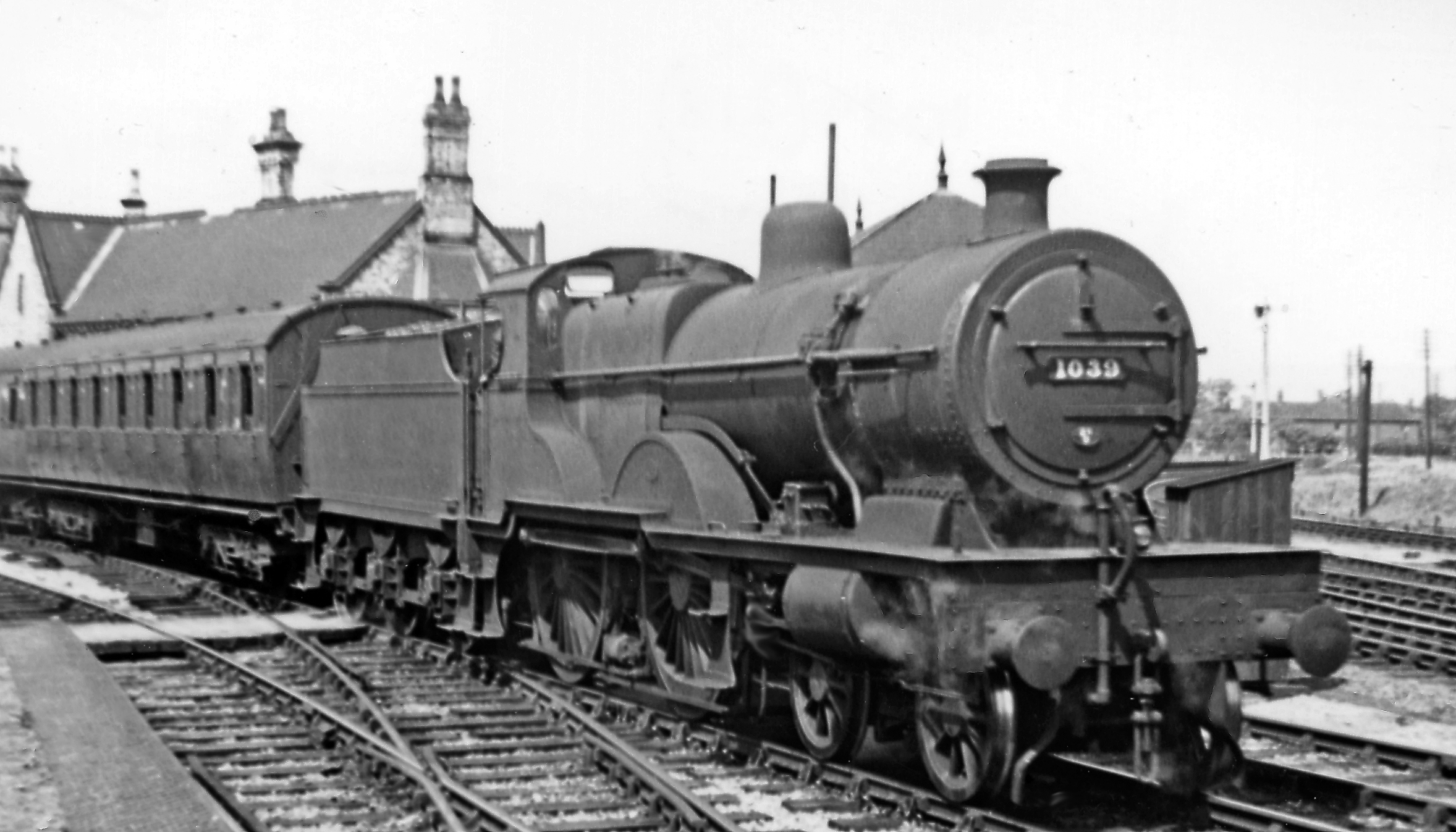
- 1039 at Ashchurch in 1947
Type and origin
- Power type: Steam
- Designer: Samuel Waite Johnson: renewed as superheated Deeley compound by Henry Fowler
- Builder: Derby Works
- Build date: 1902–1909
- Total produced: 45
- Rebuild date: 1913–1928
Specifications
- Configuration
  - Whyte: 4-4-0
  - UIC: 2′B h3v
- Gauge: 4 ft 8 1/2 in (1,435 mm) standard gauge
- Leading dia.: 3 ft 6 1/2 in (1.080 m)
- Driver dia.: 7 ft 0 in (2.134 m)
- Fuel type: Coal
- Water cap.: 3,500 imp gal (16,000 L; 4,200 US gal)
- Boiler: 2631–2635 and 1000–1004: G8½; Remainder: G9; All rebuilt with G9AS
- Boiler pressure: 220 psi (1.52 MPa)
- Cylinders: Three, one inside high-pressure, two outside low-pressure
- High-pressure cylinder: 19 in × 26 in (483 mm × 660 mm)
- Low-pressure cylinder: 21 in × 26 in (533 mm × 660 mm)
- Valve gear: Stephenson
- Valve type: HP: piston valve, LP: slide valves
Performance figures
- Tractive effort: 21,840 lbf (97.1 kN)
Career
- Operators: MR → LMS → BR
- Class: 1000
- Power class: 4P
- Locale: London Midland Region
- Withdrawn: 1948–1953
- Disposition: One preserved, remainder scrapped

The Midland Railway 1000 Class is a class of 4-4-0 steam locomotive designed for passenger work. They were known to reach speeds of up to 85 mph (137 km/h).

== Overview ==
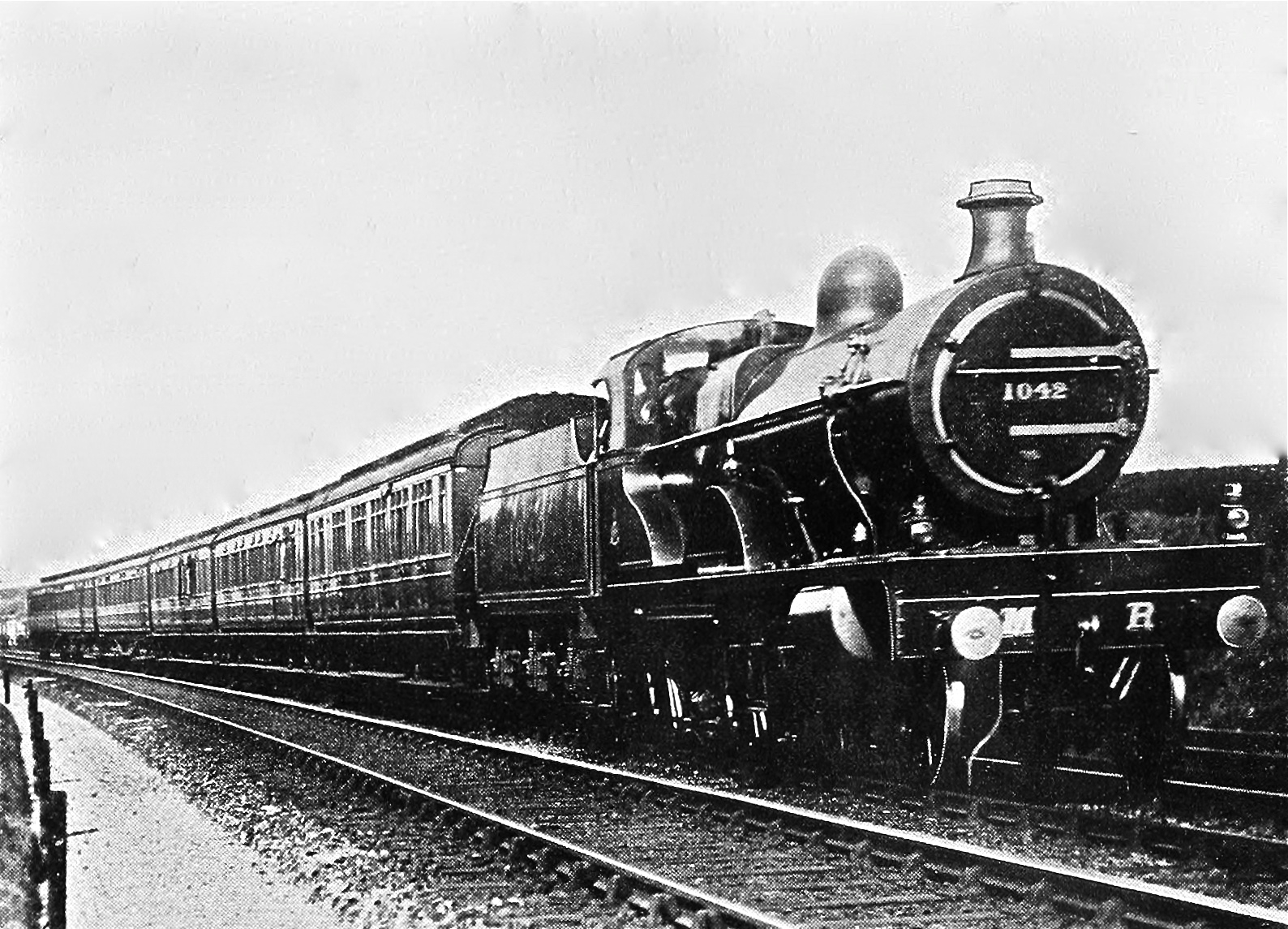
No 1042 (Deeley-built) with a Bradford to London express, between 1908 and 1910

These were developed from a series of five locomotives (2631–2635) introduced in 1902 by Samuel Waite Johnson, which had a 3-cylinder compound arrangement on the Smith system, with one high-pressure cylinder inside the frames and two low-pressure cylinders outside, and used Smith's starting arrangement. On the first two locomotives independent control of high-pressure and low-pressure valve gears was available.

From 1905 onwards, Johnson's successor Richard Deeley built an enlarged and simplified version, eliminating all the Smith refinements and fitting his own starting arrangement, making the engines simpler to drive. These locomotives were originally numbered 1000–1029, but in the 1907 renumbering scheme the five Smith/Johnson locomotives became 1000–1004 and the Deeley compounds 1005–1034. Ten more of these were added in 1908–1909. The original Johnson locomotives were all subsequently renewed as Deeley compounds, including the now-preserved 1000 which was rebuilt and outshopped with a superheater in 1914.

Numbered 1000–1044 by both the Midland and LMS companies, British Railways renumbered the Midland series of compounds 41000–41044 after nationalisation in 1948.

== LMS compound locomotives ==
After the grouping, the LMS continued to build slightly modified MR Compounds as the LMS Compound 4-4-0.

== Accidents and incidents ==
- On 23 December 1904, locomotive No. 1040 was hauling an express passenger train that was derailed at Aylesbury, Buckinghamshire due to excessive speed on a curve. Locomotive No. 1042 was hauling an express passenger train that collided with the wreckage at low speed. Four people were killed.

- On 19 January 1918, locomotive No. 1010 was hauling an express passenger train that was derailed when it ran into a landslip obstructing the line at Little Salkeld, Cumberland. Seven people were killed and 46 were injured.
- On 10 July 1933, locomotive No. 1010 was hauling an express passenger train that was in a side-long collision with a freight train at Little Salkeld due to a signalman's error. One person was killed and about 30 were injured, one seriously.
- On 12 April 1947, locomotive No. 1004 was hauling a passenger train which was derailed near Keighley, Yorkshire when a bridge collapsed under it.
- On 21 April 1952, locomotive No. 41040 was one of two hauling a passenger train that was derailed at Blea Moor Loops, West Riding of Yorkshire when a defective brake hanger on the locomotive caused a set of points to move under the train.

== Preservation ==
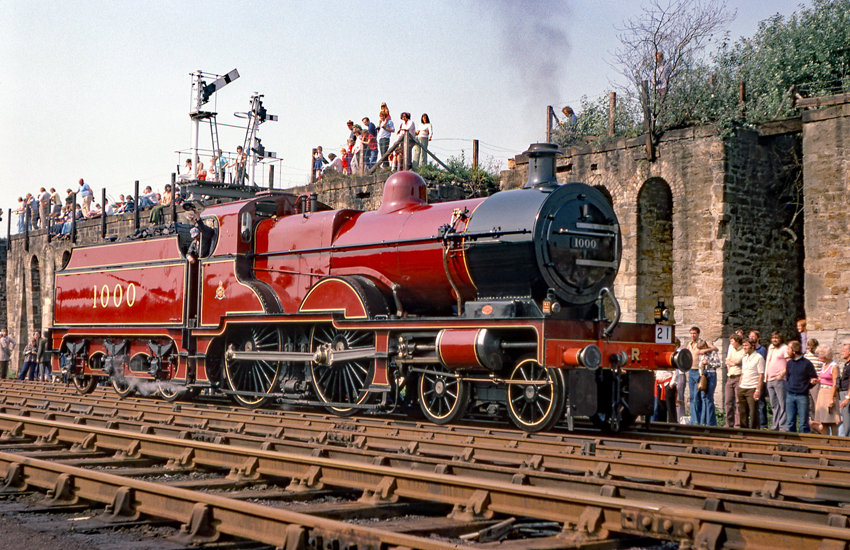
No 1000 in the S&D 150 Cavalcade, 1975

No. 1000 was set aside for preservation after withdrawal in 1951 and restored in 1959 close to its 1914 condition, painted in Midland maroon livery, running enthusiasts' specials until placed in the temporary Clapham Transport museum. Though steamed since preservation, it is currently a static exhibit at the Barrow Hill Engine Shed at Derbyshire, having been lent by the National Railway Museum in York.

No. 1000 was one of the steam locomotives chosen to be displayed at The Greatest Gathering which took place from Friday 1 to Sunday 3 August 2025. The locomotive arrived at Derby Litchurch Lane Works in May and remained there until mid August following the event.

== Other compound locomotives with the same 3-cylinder layout ==
- Nord 3.101 (renumbered 3.395 in 1909) mixed traffic 2-6-0 prototype built 1887 by the French Chemins de fer du Nord to the design of Edouard Sauvage - withdrawn in 1929
- NER Class 3CC number 1619 of the North Eastern Railway 4-4-0 express locomotive rebuilt in 1898 from a 2-cylinder compound. This was W.M. Smith's first application of his patent compound system.
- Four Robinson 4-4-2 Atlantic locomotives, classes 8D and 8E, built 1905–1906 as Smith compounds for the British Great Central Railway.
- One 4-6-2 locomotive (No. 900) built by the North British Locomotive Company for the Cape Government Railway in South Africa.
- Five 4-4-0 locomotives (GNRI Class V) designed by G.T Glover and built in 1932 for the Great Northern Railway (Ireland). These used the Deeley starting arrangement.
- André Chapelon's 4-8-4 SNCF 242 A 1
- CSD 476.0/932.3 4-8-2 1949
