= GCR Classes 8D and 8E =

Three-cylinder compound steam locomotives

GCR Classes 8D and 8E LNER Class C5
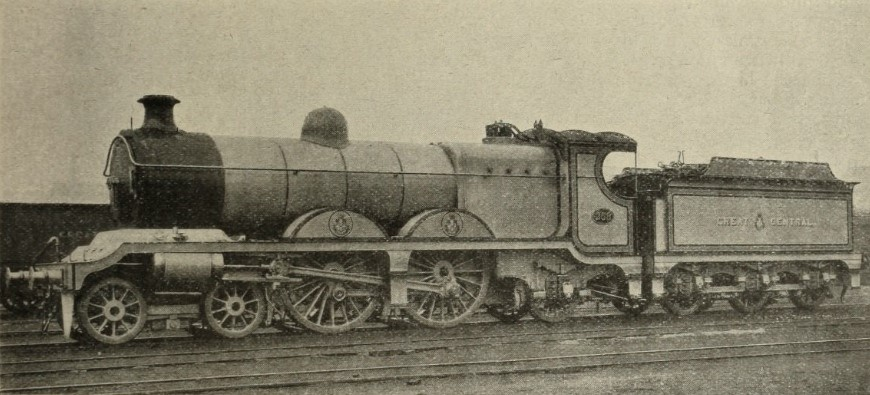
- GCR Class 8D No. 258
Type and origin
- Power type: Steam
- Designer: John G. Robinson
- Builder: GCR, at Gorton
- Build date: 1905–06
- Total produced: 4
Specifications
- Configuration
  - Whyte: 4-4-2
  - UIC: 2′B1′ n3v, later 2′B1′ h3v
- Gauge: 4 ft 8 1/2 in (1,435 mm)
- Leading dia.: 3 ft 6 in (1,070 mm)
- Driver dia.: 6 ft 9 in (2,060 mm)
- Trailing dia.: 4 ft 3 in (1,300 mm)
- Wheelbase: 51 ft 10 in (15,800 mm)
- Length: 61 ft 11 1/4 in (18,879 mm)
- Axle load: 18.5 long tons (18.8 t)
- Adhesive weight: 37 long tons (38 t)
- Loco weight: 73.3 long tons (74.5 t)
- Tender weight: 48.3 long tons (49.1 t)
- Total weight: 121.6 long tons (123.6 t)
- Fuel type: Coal
- Fuel capacity: 6 long tons (6.1 t)
- Water cap.: 4,000 imp gal (18,000 L)
- Firebox
  - Grate area: 26.24 sq ft (2.438 m^{2})
- Boiler pressure: 180 psi (1.2 MPa)
- Heating surface
  - Firebox: 153 sq ft (14.2 m^{2})
  - Tubes: 1,778 sq ft (165.2 m^{2})
  - Total surface: 1,931 sq ft (179.4 m^{2})
- Cylinders: Three, one inside high-pressure, two outside low-pressure
- High-pressure cylinder: 19 in × 26 in (483 mm × 660 mm)
- Low-pressure cylinder: 21 in × 26 in (533 mm × 660 mm)
- Valve gear: Stephenson
- Valve type: HP: piston valve, LP: slide valves
- Train heating: Steam
- Loco brake: Steam
- Train brakes: Vacuum
Performance figures
- Tractive effort: 13,321 lbf (59.25 kN)
Career
- Operators: Great Central Railway; → London and North Eastern Railway
- Class: GCR: 8D, 8E; LNER: C5
- Number in class: 4
- Numbers: GCR: 258/9, 364/5; LNER: 5258/9, 5364/5, then 2895–8
- Nicknames: "Compounds"
- Axle load class: LNER: RA 7
- Withdrawn: 1946–47
- Disposition: All scrapped

GCR Classes 8D and 8E were two pairs of three-cylinder compound steam locomotives of the 4-4-2 wheel arrangement built in 1905 and 1906 for the Great Central Railway.

== History ==
In 1903, the Great Central Railway (GCR) had given comparative trials to two pairs of two-cylinder express passenger steam locomotives designed by their Chief Mechanical Engineer, John G. Robinson. These were similar in most respects, the main difference being that one pair (class 8B) were of the 4-4-2 wheel arrangement, whereas the other pair (class 8C) were 4-6-0. These trials demonstrated that the 4-4-2 was best for the GCR conditions, and so five more of class 8B were ordered, soon followed by a batch of 12.

Whilst these were under construction, it was decided to compare the merits of these locomotives against a three-cylinder compound of similar size. Accordingly, two compounds of the 4-4-2 wheel arrangement were built: no. 258 in December 1905 followed by no. 259 in February 1906, and these formed Class 8D.

The class 8D locomotives were designed by Robinson according to the principles of Walter M. Smith, in which there were three cylinders: the boiler fed a single high-pressure cylinder placed between the frames, where the steam was partially used; it was then passed to two low-pressure cylinders mounted outside the frames, which extracted the remaining useful work from the steam. The same system had already been tried by Smith's employers, the North Eastern Railway in their class 3CC of 1898, and with great success by the Midland Railway (MR) in their 1000 class of 1902. The GCR engines used the same size cylinders as the MR engines, but were arranged differently. On the MR engines, all three cylinders drove the same axle, but the GCR engines were designed so that the high-pressure cylinder drove the front coupled axle as on the MR engines, whereas the low-pressure cylinders drove the rear coupled axle; the first use of this arrangement in Britain.

Walter M. Smith's son, John W. Smith, joined the GCR at Gorton on 20 August 1906 as Works Manager & Chief Draughtsman. The GCR ordered ten more 4-4-2s for delivery in 1906: of these, eight were to the class 8B design, and two were compounds. These two, nos. 364/5, shared a number of components with the eight class 8B engines, and were sufficiently different from the two compounds of class 8D to warrant a separate classification, so became Class 8E. No more 4-4-2s were built for the GCR, of any of these classes, although in 1908, Robinson did consider ordering more compounds: but the introduction of superheating soon provided a simpler method of reducing coal consumption.

The four locomotives therefore remained the only compounds on the GCR. They were later given superheaters: the first was no. 365 in 1911, but it was not until 1927 before the last, no. 258, was superheated.

Initially based at Gorton, they were used on the express passenger trains between Manchester London Road and London Marylebone. In 1920/21, the Manchester-London trains having become too heavy for them, they were transferred to Leicester, for use on the expresses between Leicester Central and London Marylebone. In 1932/33 they moved to Immingham, where they were mainly used on services between Cleethorpes and Doncaster, Sheffield Victoria or Retford. Withdrawal occurred between December 1946 and December 1947.

== Numbers and names ==
Number	Built	Class	Name	Withdrawn
258	December 1905	8D	The Rt. Hon. Viscount Cross G.C.B. G.C.S.I.	December 1946
259	February 1906	8D	King Edward VII	April 1947
364	December 1906	8E	Lady Henderson	December 1947
365	December 1906	8E	Sir William Pollitt	August 1947

The locomotives were originally nameless. No. 259 was the first to be named, this occurring by November 1906 and was in honour of the reigning monarch; no. 364 was named by March 1907 after the wife of the GCR Chairman, Sir Alexander Henderson; no. 365 was named by October 1907 after the former GCR General Manager; and no. 258 was last, in June 1909, being named after the senior Director on the GCR Board. The nameplate of no. 258 had the name in three rows, the lettering of the middle row (the words "VISCOUNT CROSS") being of normal size, whereas the lettering of the other two rows was significantly smaller. No. 364 was renamed Lady Faringdon in 1917, Lady Henderson's husband having been raised to the peerage as the first Baron Faringdon the previous year.

After the Grouping, the LNER increased the GCR numbers by 5000, this occurring in 1924–5. Under the 1946 renumbering, they became 2895–8 in the same order.
