= Midland Railway Class 2 4-4-0 =

Class of British steam locomotives

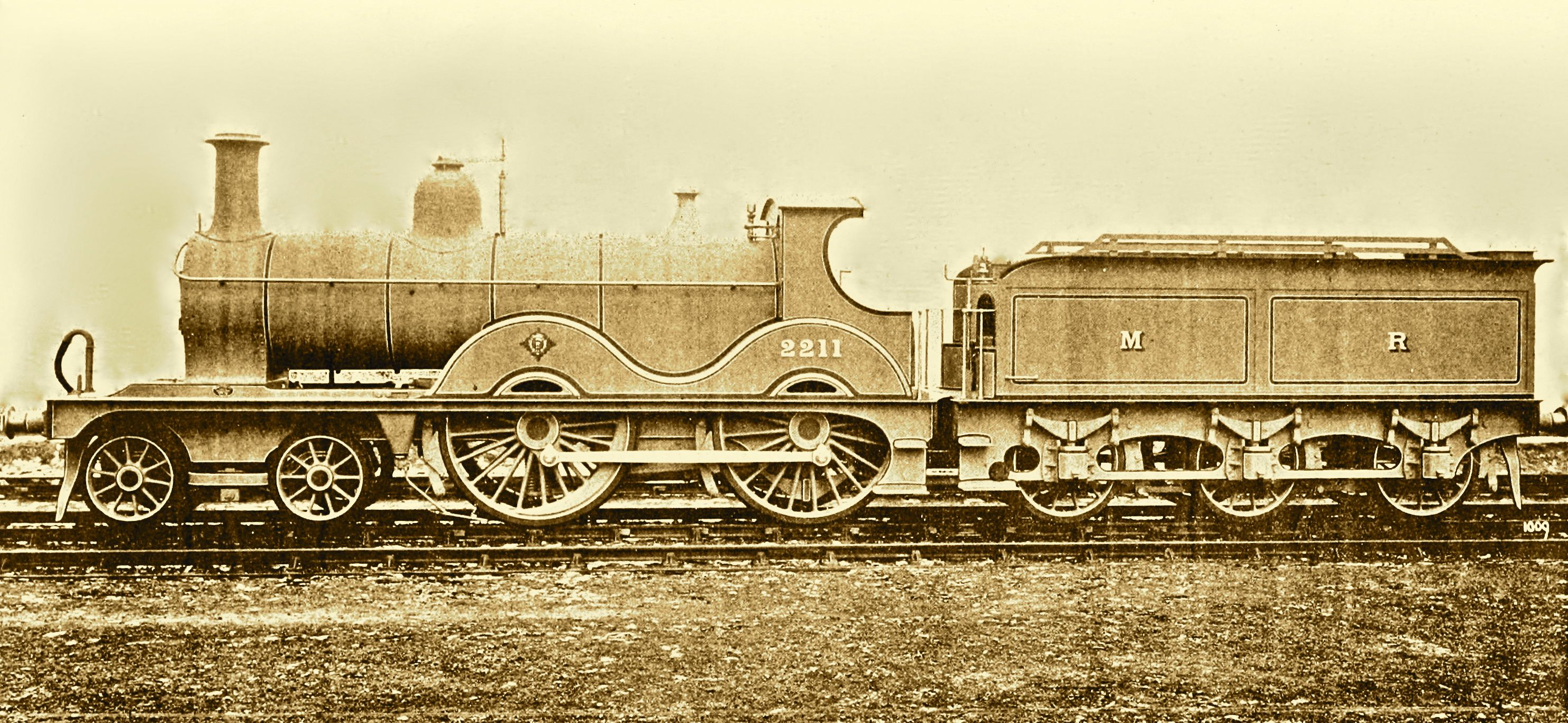
2211 of the 2203 class, 1893

The Midland Railway Class 2 4-4-0 was a series of 12 classes of 4-4-0 steam locomotives built by and for the Midland Railway between 1876 and 1901 while Samuel W. Johnson held the post of locomotive superintendent. They were designed for use on express passenger trains but later on were downgraded to secondary work when more powerful types were introduced.

During their history they were repeatably rebuilt, sometimes leaving virtually none of their original parts.

== As built ==
275 were built in all:

Class	Images	Pre-1907 Nos.	Post-1907 Nos.	Manufacturer	Date	Quantity built	Driving wheel diameter	Cylinders	Boiler	Notes
1312	-	1312–1321	300–309	Kitson & Co.	1876	10	6 ft 6 in	17½ in × 26 in	B - 140 psi	
1327		1327–1346	310–327	Dübs & Co.	1876	20	7 ft 0 in	18 in × 26 in	B - 140 psi	
1562	-	1562–1666	328–357	Derby Works	1882–1884	30	6 ft 8½ in	18 in × 26 in	B - 140 psi	
1667		1667–1676	—	Derby Works	1884	10	7 ft 0 in	18 in × 26 in	B - 140 psi	Joy valve gear. Withdrawn early and replaced by 156 class
1738		1738–1757	358–377	Derby Works	1885	20	7 ft 0 in	18 in × 26 in	B - 160 psi	No. 1757 named "Beatrice"
1808	-	1808–1822; 80–87, 11, 14	378–402	Derby Works	1888–1891	25	6 ft 6 in	18 in × 26 in	B - 160 psi	
2183		2183–2202	403-422	Sharp, Stewart & Co. (20)	1892	20	7 ft 0 in	18½ in × 26 in	D - 160 psi	
2203		2203–2217; 184–199; 161–164; 230–239	428–472	Sharp, Stewart & Co. (15); Derby Works (30)	1893–1895	45	6 ft 6 in	18½ in × 26 in	D - 160 psi	
2581	-	2581–2590	473–482	Beyer, Peacock & Co.	1900	10	6 ft 6 in	18½ in × 26 in	B - 160 psi	"Like M&GN C Class"
156	-	156–160; 150, 153–155; 204–209; 1667–1676	423–427; 483–502	Derby Works (25)	1896–1901	25	7 ft 0 in	19 in × 26 in	D - 160 psi	Includes 10 renewed "1667" class
2421	-	2421–2440	503–522	Sharp, Stewart & Co.	1899	20	7 ft 0 in	18½ in × 26 in	D - 170 psi	
60		60–69, 93; 138–139; 151–152; 165–169; 805–809; 2636–2640; 2591–2600	523–562	Derby Works (30); Neilson & Co. (10)	1898–1899	40	7 ft 0½ in	19 in × 26 in or 19½ in × 26 in	E - 170 psi	

The "B", "D" and "E" boilers all had the same 4 ft 1 in (1,240 mm) diameter barrel, but had progressively longer fireboxes, "D" being 7 in (180 mm) longer than "B" and "E" being 6 in (150 mm) longer than "D", giving a larger grate area.

Starting with the "1738" class boilers were made of steel rather than wrought iron, which accounts for the higher permitted pressures.

== Later history ==
=== "1312" and "1327" classes ===
The two earliest classes never received larger boilers, though between 1884 and 1891 the "1312"s received enlarged cylinders of 18 in × 22 in (460 mm × 560 mm).

Withdrawals began in 1904 with two of the "1327" class. 16 out of 30 survived to the grouping but not long after, the last withdrawal being in 1934.

=== "1667" class ===
These were built with Joy valve gear. This proved not altogether satisfactory and the 10 engines were withdrawn early (between 1896 & 1901) and replaced by new engines of the "150" class with the same numbers.

=== Remainder ===
From 1904 to 1907 all 195 were re-equipped with larger "H" boilers, the same length as the "E", but with a larger diameter (4 ft 8 in (1,420 mm) rather than 4 ft 1 in (1,240 mm)).

However, only a few years later, from 1909–1911, many of these were replaces again with "G7" Belpaire boilers. This affected 44 engines, mostly of the earlier classes ("1562", "1738" and "1808").

But starting in 1912 a decision was made to instead rebuild the class with superheated "G7S" boilers. The results were essentially completely new engines (designated "483" class), but carrying the numbers of old ones. A possible reason for this was that royalties paid to the Schmidt superheater company were less for a "rebuild" than for a new engine. "H" boilers so released were passed onto 0-6-0 goods engines.

This started with the "156", "2421" and "60" classes and continued until the end of 1923, when 157 had been "renewed".

This "483" class formed the basis for the LMS Class 2P 4-4-0 of which 138 were built.

Details of "483" class:

Driving wheels	7 ft 1/2 in (2,146 mm)
Cylinders	20 1/2 in × 26 in (520 mm × 660 mm)
Boiler	G7S
Pressure	160 psi (1,100 kPa)
Heating surface	1,483 ft^{2} (137.8 m^{2})
Grate area	21.1 ft^{2} (1.96 m^{2})

=== Withdrawal ===
Those 37 still with "H" boilers were all withdrawn 1925–1928.

Those with "G7" boilers mostly went in the late 1920s and 30s, but the last one survived until 1952.

The "483" conversions all survived to be nationalized, the last withdrawal was in 1963. None have been preserved.
