= NER Class M1 =

Class of British steam locomotives

NER Class M1/M, Q and Q1 LNER Class D17/1, D17/2 and D18
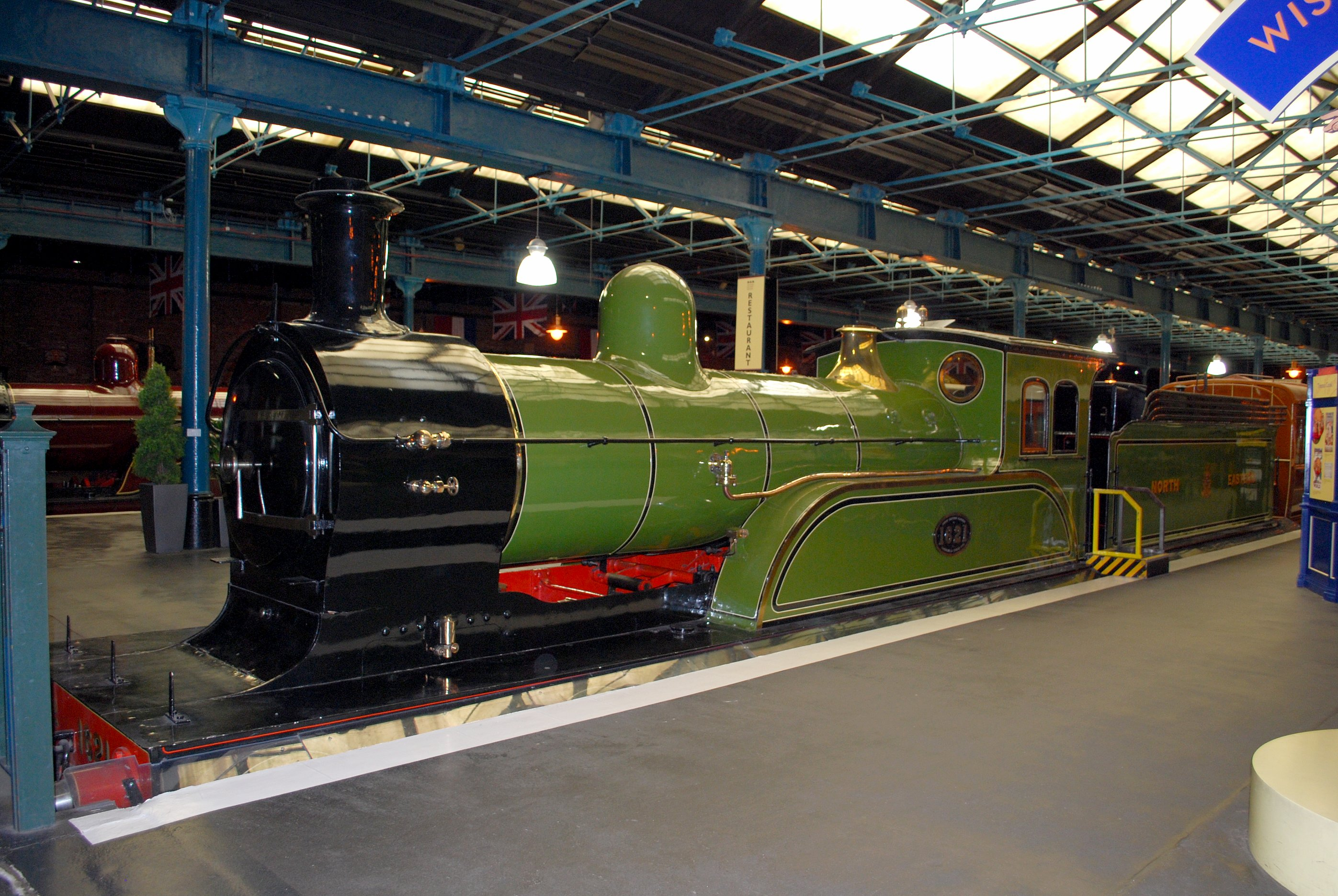
- Preserved M1 No. 1621 in the National Railway Museum, York, September 2010
Type and origin
- Power type: Steam
- Designer: Wilson Worsdell
- Builder: NER Gateshead
- Build date: 1892-1894 (Class M1); 1896-1897 (Class Q); 1896 (Class Q1)
- Total produced: 20 (Class M1); 30 (Class Q); 2 (Class Q1)
Specifications
- Configuration
  - Whyte: 4-4-0
  - UIC: 2′B n2
- Gauge: 4 ft 8 1/2 in (1,435 mm)
- Leading dia.: 3 ft 7 1/4 in (1,099 mm)
- Driver dia.: 7 ft 1 1/4 in (2,165 mm)
- Wheelbase: 23 ft 6 in (7.16 m) Class M1/Q engine 23 ft 9 in (7.24 m) Class Q1 engine 12 ft 8 in (3.86 m) tender 45 ft 8 1/4 in (13.926 m) Class M1/Q total 46 ft 2 3/4 in (14.091 m) Class Q1 total
- Length: Q1 17.145 m (56.25 ft)
- Axle load: M1: 18.6 long tons (18.9 t); Q: 18.8 long tons (19.1 t); Q1: 19.2 long tons (19.5 t)
- Loco weight: 52.5 long tons (53.3 t) (Class M1); 50.3 long tons (51.1 t) (Class Q); 53.5 long tons (54.4 t) (Class Q1)
- Tender weight: 41.2 long tons (41.9 t)
- Total weight: 93.7 long tons (95.2 t) (Class M1); 91.5 long tons (93.0 t) (Class Q); 94.7 long tons (96.2 t) (Class Q1)
- Fuel type: Coal
- Water cap.: 4,125 imp gal (18,750 L; 4,954 US gal)
- Firebox
  - Grate area: 19.8 sq ft (1.84 m^{2})
- Boiler: 4 ft 4 in (1.32 m) diameter
- Boiler pressure: 160 psi (1.10 MPa)
- Heating surface
  - Firebox: 123 sq ft (11.4 m^{2})
  - Tubes: 479 sq ft (44.5 m^{2})
  - Flues: 291 sq ft (27.0 m^{2})
  - Total surface: 1,097 sq ft (101.9 m^{2})
- Superheater
  - Heating area: 204 sq ft (19.0 m^{2})
- Cylinders: Two, inside
- Cylinder size: 19 in × 26 in (483 mm × 660 mm); 20 in × 26 in (508 mm × 660 mm) (No. 1870)
- Valve gear: Stephenson
Performance figures
- Tractive effort: 14,974 lbf (66.61 kN) (Class M1/Q); 13,990 lbf (62.23 kN) (No. 1869); 15,500 lbf (69 kN) (No. 1870)
Career
- Operators: North Eastern Railway, London & North Eastern Railway, British Rail
- Withdrawn: 1931–1945 (Class M1); 1931–1948 (Class Q); 1930 (Class Q1)
- Disposition: One M1 preserved (No. 1621); remainder M1, Q & Q1 scrapped

The North Eastern Railway Class M1 (LNER Class D17/1) is a class of 4-4-0 steam locomotive, designed by Wilson Worsdell. 20 initial engines were built, then 30 further units were built, designated Class Q (LNER Class D17/2).

== Classification ==
Classification was complex. The NER initially classified these locomotives "M1", while a variant (with compound expansion) was classified "M". The compound was later re-classified "3CC" and the "M1" was re-classified "M".

Under LNER ownership the "M" (formerly "M1") became LNER Class D17/1 and the "3CC" (formerly "M") became LNER Class D19.

This table summarises LNER classes D17, D18 and D19, which were all very similar:

Original NER class	New NER class	LNER Class	Cylinders	Driving wheels
M1	M	D17/1	(2) 19″ × 26″	7′ 1¼″
Q	-	D17/2	(2) 19½″ × 26″	7′ 1¼″
Q1	-	D18	(2) 19½″ × 26″	7′ 7¼″
M	3CC	D19	HP (1) 19″ × 26″ LP (2) 20″ × 24″	7′ 1¼″

- HP = high-pressure cylinder, LP = low-pressure cylinders

== Accidents and incidents ==
- On 4 October 1894, locomotive No. 1622 was one of two locomotives hauling a sleeping car train which overran signals and collided with a freight train that was being shunted at Castle Hills, Yorkshire. One person was killed.

- On 14 February 1927, locomotive No. 1628 was hauling a passenger train that was in a head-on collision with another at Hull Paragon station, Yorkshire due to a signalman's error. Twelve people were killed and 24 were injured.

== Withdrawal ==
The last two D17/1s were withdrawn in 1945. Number 1629 was scrapped but number 1621 was saved for preservation.

No D17/1s passed into British Railways ownership. Two D17/2s did (BR numbers 62111 and 62112) but they were withdrawn in February 1948.

== Preservation ==
- D17/1 number 1621 is preserved at the National Railway Museum. It is currently housed in the Main Hall at Locomotion, Shildon
