= Ernest Lemon =

Sir Ernest Lemon
- Born: 9 December 1884; Sturminster Newton, Dorset, England
- Died: 15 December 1954 (aged 70); Epsom, Surrey, England
- Education: Heriot-Watt College
- Engineering career
- Discipline: Mechanical
- Institutions: Institution of Mechanical Engineers

Sir Ernest John Hutchings Lemon OBE (9 December 1884 – 15 December 1954) was an English railway engineer, and was chief mechanical engineer of the London, Midland and Scottish Railway and later one of its three Vice-Presidents. During the run-up to the Second World War, Lemon was made Director-General of Aircraft Production and made crucial improvements to aircraft production.

== Biography ==
Lemon was born in the small village of Okeford Fitzpaine, in the registration district of Sturminster Newton, North Dorset. His father was a carpenter, and his mother laundress for the Rectory next door, where his first work experience was as a "back door boy". The Rector recognised his potential, and when the Rector's daughter moved to Scotland she took Lemon with her, and he attended Heriot-Watt College, Edinburgh. He served an apprenticeship with the North British Locomotive Company and then worked for the Highland Railway and for Hurst Nelson.

In 1911, Lemon became Chief Wagon Inspector of the Midland Railway in England. In 1917, he was made Carriage Works Manager at Derby Works. In 1923, he was appointed Divisional Carriage and Wagon Superintendent at Derby. There he developed production line methods for the construction of wagons and carriages.

Despite having little experience in locomotive engineering, in 1931 Lemon was appointed to the post of chief mechanical engineer (CME) replacing the retiring Henry Fowler. After less than a year as CME however, Lemon was again promoted to Vice-President, Railway Traffic, Operating and Commercial, replacing J.H. Follows who retired due to ill health. Under his Vice-Presidency, the LMS undertook modernisation of their motive power depots. William Stanier had been head-hunted from the Great Western Railway to replace Lemon as CME and revolutionised the LMS's locomotive policy.

Lemon was a member of the Engineer and Railway Staff Corps—a Territorial Army unit of the Royal Engineers; he joined as a major in November 1929, and was promoted to lieutenant-colonel in April 1932. He resigned his commission in August 1943.

During World War II, Lemon was made Director-General of Aircraft Production. He introduced "assembly-line methods" and standardisation which enabled production to be sped up to such an extent that, at the end of the Battle of Britain, the RAF had more operational aircraft than at the start of that Battle, while Germany had fewer. Lemon received a knighthood in the 1941 New Year's Honours list. He retired from the railway in 1943 and died in Epsom in 1954.

Business positions
Preceded by Henry Fowler	Chief Mechanical Engineer of the London, Midland and Scottish Railway; 1931–1932	Succeeded by William Stanier
