= LMS Class 7F 0-8-0 =

Class of 0-8-0 locomotive

LMS 7F 0-8-0
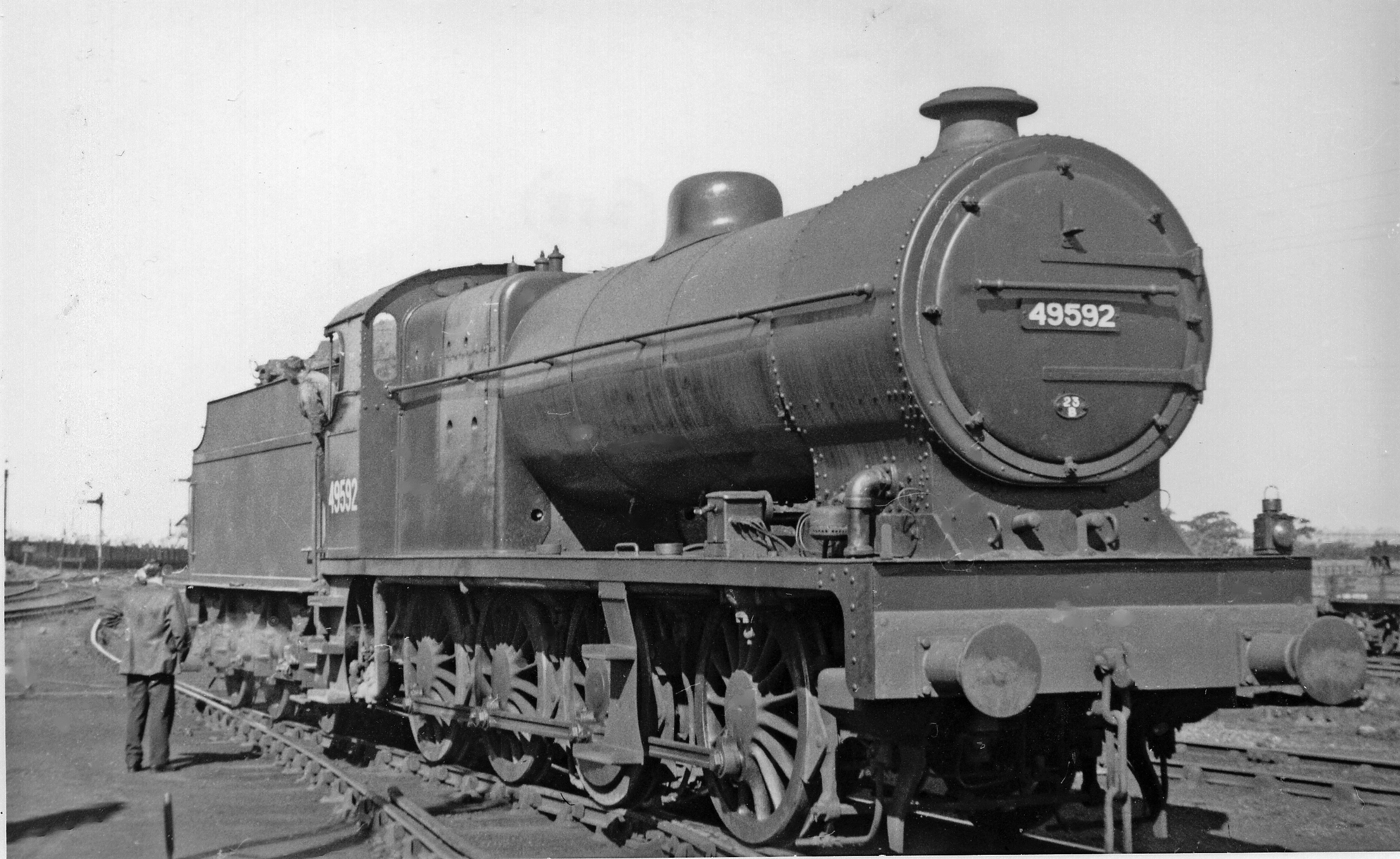
- 49592 at Aintree, June 1948.
Type and origin
- Power type: Steam
- Builder: LMS Crewe Works
- Build date: 1929–1932
- Total produced: 175
Specifications
- Configuration
  - Whyte: 0-8-0
  - UIC: D h2G
- Gauge: 4 ft 8 1/2 in (1,435 mm)
- Driver dia.: 4 ft 8 1/2 in (1,435 mm)
- Wheelbase: Loco: 18 ft 3 in (5.56 m)
- Length: 56 ft 1 in (17.09 m)
- Loco weight: 60.75 long tons (61.72 t; 68.04 short tons)
- Tender weight: 41.20 long tons (41.86 t; 46.14 short tons)
- Total weight: 101.95 long tons (103.59 t; 114.18 short tons)
- Fuel type: Coal
- Fuel capacity: 4 long tons (4.1 t; 4.5 short tons)
- Water cap.: 3,500 imp gal (16,000 L; 4,200 US gal)
- Firebox
  - Grate area: 23.5 sq ft (2.18 m^{2})
- Boiler: LMS type G7¾S
- Boiler pressure: 200 lbf/in^{2} (1.38 MPa)
- Heating surface
  - Firebox: 150 sq ft (14 m^{2})
  - Tubes and flues: 1,434 sq ft (133.2 m^{2}) later 1,402 sq ft (130.3 m^{2})
- Superheater
  - Heating area: 353 sq ft (32.8 m^{2}) to 338 sq ft (31.4 m^{2})
- Cylinders: Two
- Cylinder size: 19 1/2 in × 26 in (495 mm × 660 mm)
- Valve gear: Walschaerts, piston valves
Performance figures
- Tractive effort: 29,745 lbf (132.31 kN)
Career
- Power class: 7F
- Numbers: LMS: 9500–9674; BR: 49500–49674
- Nicknames: Baby Austins; Austin Sevens
- Withdrawn: 1949–1962
- Disposition: All scrapped

The London, Midland and Scottish Railway Fowler Class 7F was a class of 0-8-0 steam locomotives. They were a Midlandised version of the London and North Western Railway (LNWR) Class G2 and Class G2A 0-8-0 s. They were also classified as Class G3 under the former LNWR system. The class were sometimes known as Baby Austins, or Austin 7s, after a motor car that was becoming popular at the time.

== Overview ==
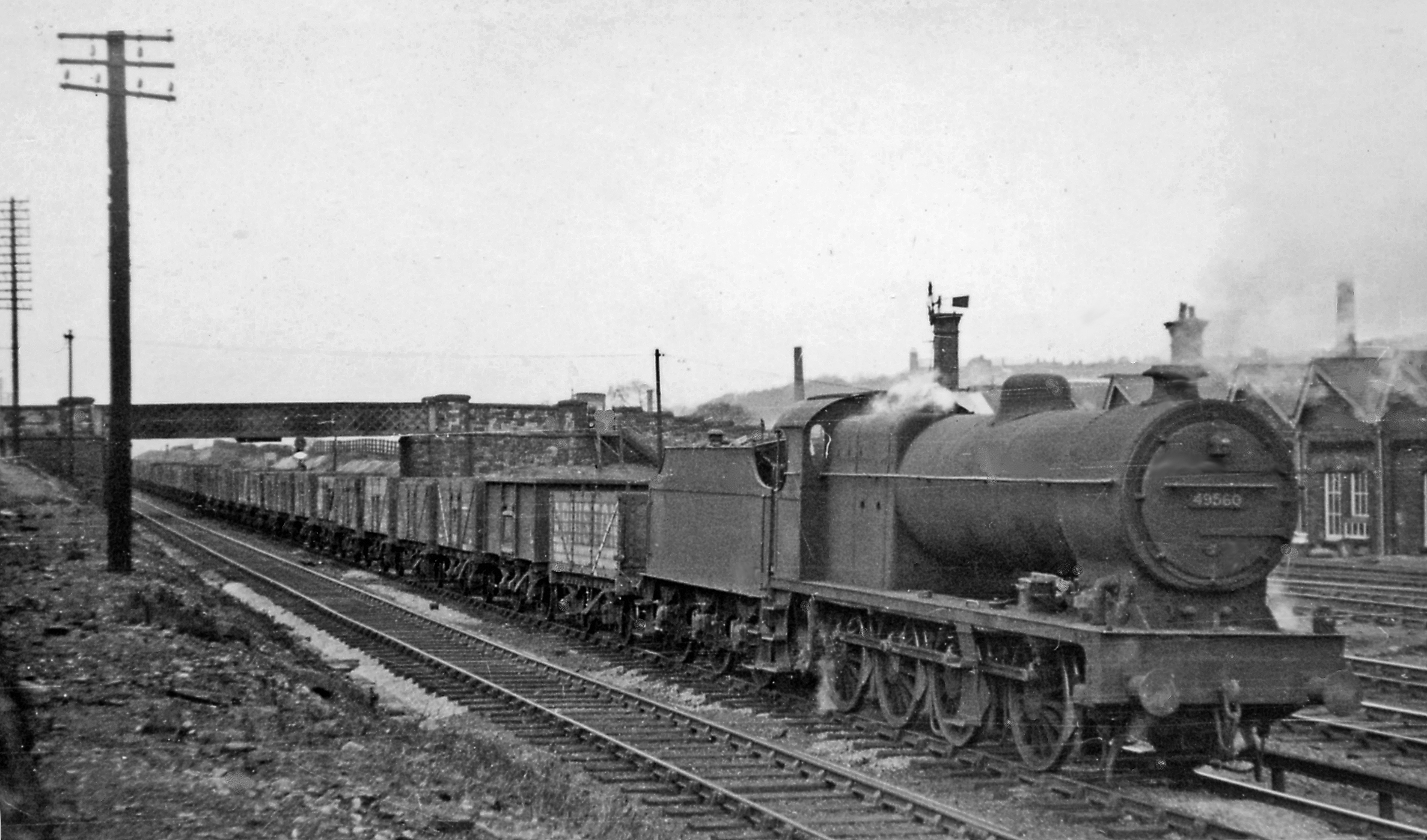
49560 with a typical freight duty in 1950

It featured a Belpaire firebox and increased boiler pressure over its predecessor but had the same power rating of 7F. Because the design had been done at the old Midland Railway's Derby Works, the drawing office staff insisted on using Midland practice. Among other things this meant that the axle bearings were too small for the loads they had to carry. E.S. Cox, writing in a series of articles in Trains Illustrated c. 1957, suggests that they had a sufficiently modern and effective front end that, for steady slogging, some drivers preferred them to an LMS Stanier Class 8F. However, this also meant that, with bearings comparable to an LMS Fowler Class 4F and already inadequate for the lower powered engine, the bearings broke up rapidly.

== Numbering ==
| Number | | Lot Number | Date built | Crewe Works serial Nos. |
| LMS | BR | Lot Number | Date built | Crewe Works serial Nos. |
|---|---|---|---|---|
| 9500–99 | 49500–99 | 57 | 1929 | 5872–5971 |
| 9600–02 | 49600–02 | 71 | 1930 | 6047–49 |
| 9603–19 | 49603–19 | 71 | 1931 | 6050–66 |
| 9620–32 | 49620–32 | 81 | 1931 | 1–13 |
| 9633 | 49633 | 81 | 1932 | 14 |
| 9634–35 | 49634–35 | 81 | 1931 | 15–16 |
| 9636–59 | 49636–59 | 81 | 1932 | 17–40 |
| 9660–74 | 49660–74 | 84 | 1932 | 41–55 |

== Equipment ==
Numbers 9672–74 were fitted with ACFI feedwater heaters when built but these were removed during the Second World War. After the war, five were briefly converted to oil burning.

== British Railways ==
All members of the class entered British Railways ownership in 1948, but 122 had been withdrawn by the end of 1951; fifty were withdrawn without receiving their BR number. They had a fairly short life, and all were withdrawn and scrapped between 1949 and 1962, some time before the final G2s were withdrawn in 1964.

== Accidents and incidents ==
- On 13 March 1935, a milk train hauled by LMS Compound 4-4-0 No. 1165 had a rear-end collision with an express freight train hauled by LNWR Claughton Class 4-6-0 No. 5946 at King's Langley, Hertfordshire due to a signalman's error. Another freight train, hauled by LMS Patriot Class 4-6-0 No. 5511, collided with the wreckage. Locomotive No. 9598 was hauling a coal train that ran into the wreckage. One person was killed.
- On 14 May 1948, a locomotive of the class was hauling a freight train that ran away and was in collision with an empty stock train at Battyeford, Yorkshire.

== Withdrawal ==
All engines were withdrawn between 1949 and 1962.

Table of withdrawals
| Year | Quantity in service at start of year | Quantity withdrawn | Locomotive numbers |
|---|---|---|---|
| 1949 | 175 | 61 | 9504/07/12/17–18/21–22/27–28/30/33–34/42/46/49–50/59/65/73/75–77/84/97/99, 9601/04/06/13–14/16/26/29/32–33/39/42/44–46/52/54/56/58/69–70, 49513/25–26/39/51–52/64/81/84, 49607/11/22/30/43/47. |
| 1950 | 114 | 37 | 9514/29, 9619/21, 49500–01/16/19–20/31/35/37/41/43/53/56/61/67/69/74–75/79/83/96, 49605/09/15/28/34–36/41/49/51/53/55/65. |
| 1951 | 77 | 24 | 49502/10/23/40/58/68/71/80/85/87/89–90/93–95, 49610/17/23/25/31/50/60/63/73. |
| 1952 | 53 | 6 | 49506/48/63/91, 49661/71. |
| 1953 | 47 | 4 | 49524, 49600/08/12. |
| 1954 | 43 | 2 | 49503, 49602. |
| 1955 | 41 | 3 | 49554/57/70. |
| 1956 | 38 | 6 | 49532/52, 49603/20/38/66. |
| 1957 | 32 | 12 | 49536/38/45/47/55/60/66, 49648/57/59/64/72. |
| 1958 | 20 | 0 | — |
| 1959 | 20 | 11 | 49509/11/15/78/82/86/92/98, 49640/62/67. |
| 1960 | 9 | 4 | 49505/44, 49624/74. |
| 1961 | 5 | 4 | 49618/27/37/68. |
| 1962 | 1 | 1 | 49508. |
