= Richard William Allen =

English mechanical engineer

Allen in May 1948.

Sir Richard William Allen CBE DL (1 February 1867 – 17 July 1955) was a Welsh mechanical engineer.

Allen was born in Cardiff, the son of William Henry Allen, and was educated at Christ College, Finchley. He received a private technical education and was apprenticed for four years at his father's firm. He worked as a draughtsman with John Elder and Co. in Glasgow, and then with the Naval Construction and Armaments Co. at Barrow in Furness. In 1890, he visited the United States, and returned as assistant manager at W. H. Allen and Co. When the company's works were transferred to Bedford in 1894, he became a partner and later managing director.

Allen was one of the founders of Bedfordshire County Cricket Club in 1899 and was Honorary Secretary until 1919 and President from 1953 till his death.

Allen was awarded the C.B.E. in 1918 and became chairman of W H Allen and co on the death of his father in 1926. He became President of the Institution of Mechanical Engineers in 1928. He was knighted in 1942.

Professional and academic associations
| Preceded by Sir Henry Fowler | President of the Institution of Mechanical Engineers; 1928 | Succeeded by Daniel Adamson |
