= Henry Fowler (engineer) =

Locomotive Engineer

Sir Henry Fowler
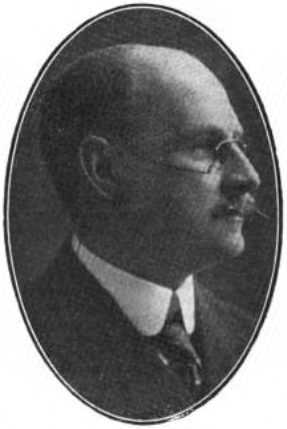
- In The Railway News, 30 September 1916
- Born: 29 July 1870; Evesham, Worcestershire, England
- Died: 16 October 1938 (aged 68); Spondon, Derby, Derbyshire, England
- Education: Mason Science College, now the University of Birmingham
- Spouse: Emmie Needham Smith (m. 1895; died 1934)
- Children: 3
- Engineering career
- Discipline: Locomotive engineer
- Institutions: Institution of Mechanical Engineers

Sir Henry Fowler, KBE (29 July 1870 – 16 October 1938) was an English railway engineer, and was chief mechanical engineer of the Midland Railway and subsequently the London, Midland and Scottish Railway.

== Biography ==
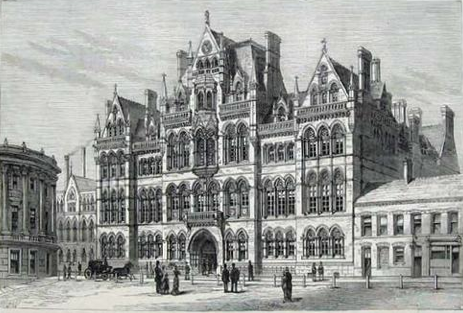
Mason Science College, now the University of Birmingham

Fowler was born in Evesham, Worcestershire, on 29 July 1870. His father, also named Henry, was a furniture dealer, and his family were Quakers. He was educated at Prince Henry's Grammar School, Evesham (now Prince Henry's High School, Evesham), and at Mason Science College (which became the University of Birmingham) between 1885 and 1887 where he studied metallurgy. He served an apprenticeship under John Aspinall at the Lancashire and Yorkshire Railway (L&YR)'s Horwich Works from 1887 to 1891. Fowler was elected as a Whitworth Exhibitioner in 1891. He then spent four years in the Testing Department under George Hughes, whom he succeeded as head of the department.

He married Emmie Needham Smith in 1895, and they had three children. Emmie died in 1934.

Between 1895 and 1900, he was gas engineer of the L&YR, moving on 18 June 1900 to the Midland Railway (MR). On 1 November 1905 he became assistant works manager, being promoted to works manager two years later.

In 1908, following a visit to Sheffield, he is accredited with the formation of the Midland Railway Engineering Club which is now called the Derby Railway Engineering Society.

In 1909, he succeeded Richard Deeley as chief mechanical engineer (CME) of the MR.

Between 1915 and 1919, Fowler was employed on war work and James Anderson became acting CME. During the First World War he was seconded to the Ministry of Munitions, being director of production from 1915 to 1917 and then assistant director general of aircraft production. In 1919, Fowler was made a Knight Commander of the Order of the British Empire (KBE) for his contributions to the war effort.

On the Grouping of 1923, he was appointed deputy CME of the newly formed London, Midland and Scottish Railway (LMS), under George Hughes and became CME in October 1925. He was also invited to serve on the Government Bridge Stress Committee investigating stresses in railway-bridges, especially as regards the effects of moving loads

Along with Anderson, Fowler was responsible for the adoption by the LMS of the Midland's small engine policy. Various Midland standard types were built by the LMS, including the 4P Midland Compound 4-4-0, the 2P 4-4-0, the 4F 0-6-0, and the 3F 0-6-0T. The small engine policy resulted in frequent double-heading, as the locomotives were not powerful enough to cope with loads, and thus increased expense. Standardisation also left these standard locomotives with short-travel valves and small axle boxes, the former leading to inefficiency and the latter to frequent hot axle boxes.

In 1928, the LMS introduced the Royal Scot 4-6-0 express passenger locomotive, based on the SR Lord Nelson Class.

In another departure from the small engine policy, several 2-6-0+0-6-2 Beyer-Garratts were acquired for the Toton-Brent coal trains. However, interference from Derby meant that the locomotives received standard small axle-boxes and short-travel valves, with the result that they were poor performers.

Fowler was not a hands-on engineer in the mould of George Jackson Churchward. Although (as was traditional) designs produced during his tenure were credited to him as "Fowler" locomotives, the majority of the work was done by his staff, with minimal personal involvement from Fowler. An analogy may be made with his successor Sir William Stanier's Princess Coronation (Duchess) class, which was largely designed by LMS draughtsmen while Stanier was out of the country, although Stanier was more deeply involved in other designs during his tenure.

In 1930, Fowler became President of the Whitworth Society as successor to Mr. F. H. Livens, J.P.

Fowler retired in 1933, Ernest Lemon initially taking over as CME for a short period before William Stanier was head-hunted into the job from the Great Western Railway. Stanier was to reform LMS locomotive policy.

Fowler died on 16 October 1938 at his home, Spondon Hall (now demolished), Derby. He was buried in the Nottingham Road Cemetery, Chaddesden, Derby.

== Locomotive designs ==
The following classes of steam locomotive were introduced by Sir Henry:

For the Midland Railway

- Midland Railway 3835 class 0-6-0
- Midland Railway 483 class 4-4-0
- Battery locomotive 0-4-0

For the Somerset and Dorset Joint Railway

- S&DJR 7F 2-8-0

For the London Midland and Scottish Railway

- LMS Class 2P 4-4-0
- LMS Class 2F "Dock Tank" 0-6-0T
- LMS Class 3MT 2-6-2T
- LMS Class 3F "Jinty" 0-6-0T
- LMS Class 4P "Compound" 4-4-0
- LMS Class 4MT 2-6-4T
- LMS Class 4F 0-6-0
- LMS Class 7F 0-8-0
- LMS Class 6P "Patriot" 4-6-0
- LMS Class 7P "Royal Scot" 4-6-0
- LMS Garratt 2-6-0+0-6-2
- LMS 6399 Fury

Government offices
Preceded by Mervyn O'Gorman	Superintendent of the Royal Aircraft Factory; 1916-1918	Succeeded by Sidney Smith
Business positions
Preceded by Richard Deeley	Chief mechanical engineer of the Midland Railway; 1909–1923	Succeeded by George Hughes as CME of the London, Midland and Scottish Railway
Preceded by George Hughes	Chief mechanical engineer of the London, Midland and Scottish Railway; 1925–1931	Succeeded by Ernest Lemon
Professional and academic associations
Preceded by Sir William Reavell	President of the Institution of Mechanical Engineers; 1927	Succeeded by Richard William Allen
