= Walter Mackersie Smith =

British engineer

Walter Mackersie Smith (1842–1906) was a British engineer who made an important contribution to the development of the compound steam locomotive. His middle name has sometimes been mis-spelt Mackenzie. He was born at Ferry-Port on Craig (now Tayport), Fife.

== Personal life ==
He married Margaret Black and they had eight children. One of his sons, Samuel Walter Johnson Smith, became a Fellow of the Royal Society. W. M. Smith died in 1906 while still working for the North Eastern Railway.

== Work ==
He was apprenticed to an engineering company in Glasgow, worked for Neilson and Company for a short time and then joined the Edinburgh and Glasgow Railway. Samuel Waite Johnson was locomotive superintendent of the E&G at the time and the two became lifelong friends. Johnson moved to the Great Eastern Railway in 1866 and Smith moved with him.

In 1874, Smith became locomotive, carriage and wagon superintendent for the Imperial Government Railways of Japan. He returned to Britain in 1883 and joined the North Eastern Railway where he eventually became chief draughtsman.

Smith's main contributions to locomotive design concerned the use of piston valves and compounding. The North Eastern Railway was already using the two-cylinder Worsdell-von Borries compound system. Smith improved on this by developing a three-cylinder compound system with one high-pressure cylinder inside and two low-pressure cylinders outside. This was tried out on the NER Class 3CC locomotive.

== Locomotives ==
The North Eastern Railway built only a small number of Smith's compound locomotives but the system had greater success on the Midland Railway under Samuel Waite Johnson, Smith's old friend. Production of the Midland Railway 1000 Class began in 1902 and ran to 45 locomotives. The design was perpetuated in the LMS Compound 4-4-0 from 1924 and production ran to 195 locomotives. A summary of British compound locomotives based on Smith's system is given here:

- NER Class 3CC
- NER Class 4CC
- Great Central Railway classes 8D and 8E
- Midland Railway 1000 Class
- LMS Compound 4-4-0
