= NER Class 3CC =

British steam locomotive

NER Class M NER Class 3CC LNER Class D19
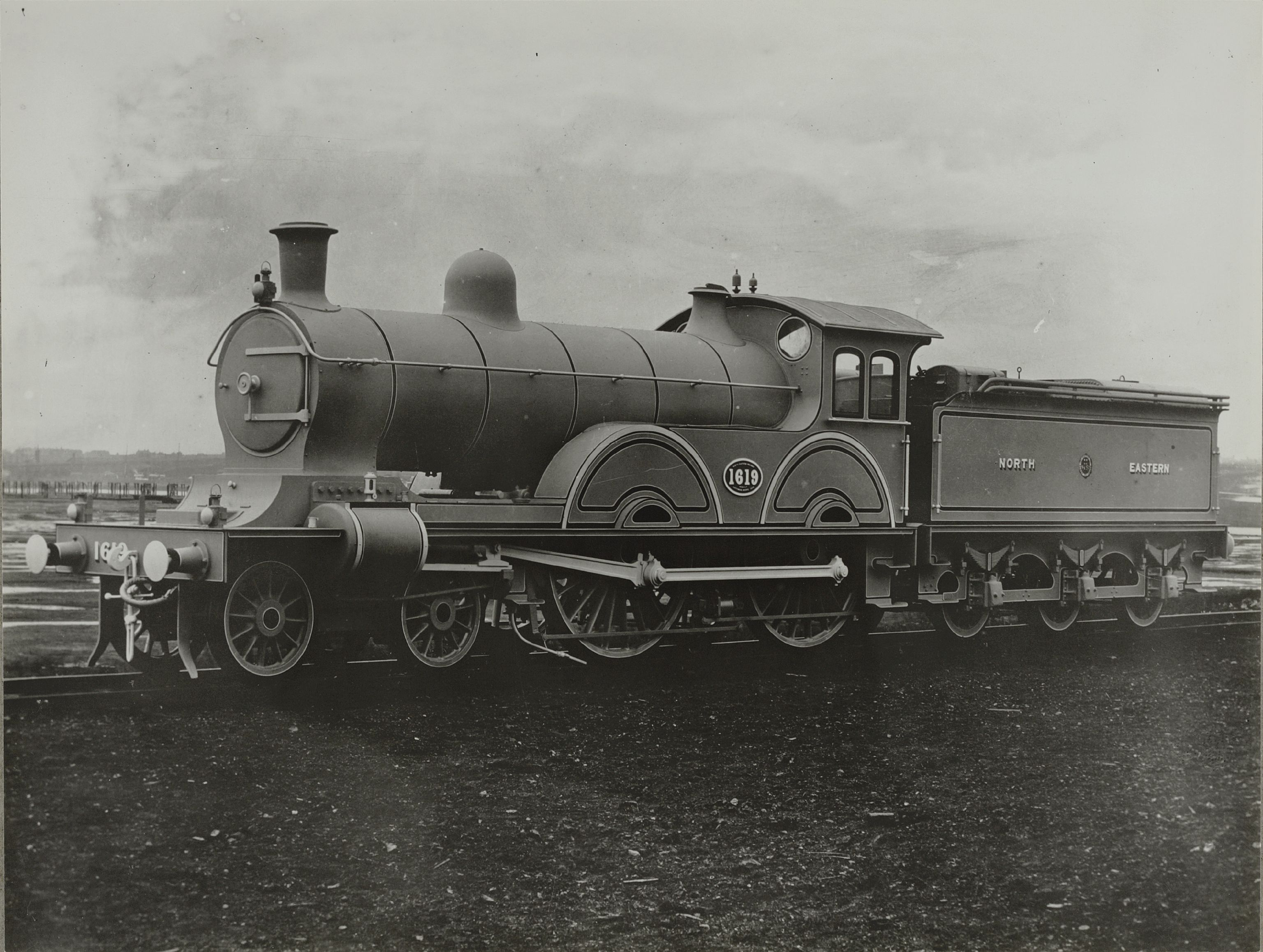
Type and origin
- Power type: Steam
- Designer: Wilson Worsdell
- Builder: NER Gateshead
- Build date: 1893
- Total produced: 1
- Rebuild date: 1898
Specifications
- Configuration
  - Whyte: 4-4-0
  - UIC: New: 2′B n2v Rebuilt: 2′B n3v
- Gauge: 4 ft 8 1/2 in (1,435 mm)
- Leading dia.: 3 ft 7 1/4 in (1,099 mm)
- Driver dia.: 7 ft 1 1/4 in (2,165 mm)
- Wheelbase: Loco: 23 ft 6 in (7.16 m); Tender: 12 ft 8 in (3.86 m); Total: 45 ft 8 3/4 in (13.94 m)
- Axle load: 20 long tons 0 cwt (44,800 lb or 20.3 t)
- Loco weight: 53 long tons 6 cwt (119,400 lb or 54.2 t)
- Tender weight: 41 long tons 4 cwt (92,300 lb or 41.9 t)
- Total weight: 94 long tons 10 cwt (211,700 lb or 96 t)
- Firebox
  - Grate area: 23.4 sq ft (2.17 m^{2})
- Boiler: 4 ft 6 in (1.37 m) diameter
- Boiler pressure: 160 psi (1.10 MPa)
- Heating surface
  - Firebox: 120 sq ft (11 m^{2})
  - Tubes: 1,170 sq ft (109 m^{2})
  - Total surface: 1,290 sq ft (120 m^{2})
- Cylinders: Three: one inside high-pressure; two outside low-pressure
- High-pressure cylinder: 19 in × 26 in (483 mm × 660 mm)
- Low-pressure cylinder: 22 in × 26 in (559 mm × 660 mm)
- Valve gear: Stephenson
Performance figures
- Tractive effort: 14,504 lbf (64.52 kN)
Career
- Operators: NER » LNER
- Numbers: 1619
- Withdrawn: 1930
- Disposition: Scrapped

The NER Class 3CC (LNER Class D19) was a 4-4-0 steam locomotive designed by Wilson Worsdell for the North Eastern Railway and built in 1893. Only one was built (number 1619) and it was a compound expansion version of the simple expansion NER Class M1. The 3CC was originally classified M but was re-classified 3CC in 1914, at the same time as the M1 was re-classified M.

== Overview ==
Number 1619 was built as a Worsdell-von Borries compound with two inside cylinders. In 1898, it was rebuilt as a three-cylinder compound with one inside high-pressure cylinder and two outside low-pressure cylinders, as a test-bed for the development of Walter Mackersie Smith's ideas.

== Classification ==
Aside from its compound expansion, the 3CC was similar to several other NER classes and they are summarised here:

| Original NER class | 1914 NER class | LNER Class | Cylinders | Driving wheels |
|---|---|---|---|---|
| M1 | M | D17/1 | (2) 19″ x 26″ | 7′ 1¼″ |
| Q | — | D17/2 | (2) 19½″ x 26″ | 7′ 1¼″ |
| Q1 | — | D18 | (2) 19½″ x 26″ | 7′ 7¼″ |
| M (new) | — | — | HP (1) 20″ x 26″ LP (1) 28″ x 26″ | 7′ 1¼″ |
| M (1898) | 3CC | D19 | HP (1) 19″ x 26″ LP (2) 20″ x 26″ | 7′ 1¼″ |

- HP = high-pressure cylinder, LP = low-pressure cylinders

== Operations ==
Around 1907 the Class 3CC locomotive was allocated from the Leeds area to Hull Botanic Gardens engine shed where it generally worked fast trains between Hull Paragon railway station and Bridlington. In 1926 it was transferred to Bridlington although its duties remained unchanged until withdrawal in October 1930.

== Accident ==
On 31 March 1920, the Class 3CC locomotive was derailed at York station whilst hauling a passenger train.

== Legacy ==
Number 1619 was a one-off but W. M. Smith went on to develop a four-cylinder compound system in the NER Class 4CC (LNER Class C8) 4-4-2 locomotive. Number 1619 was withdrawn in 1930 and was not preserved.

Smith's three-cylinder compound system was also used in the Great Central Railway classes 8D and 8E (LNER Class C5) 4-4-2s and achieved its greatest success in the Midland Railway 1000 Class and the LMS Compound 4-4-0. The Great Northern Railway (Ireland)'s class V was also a Smith compound.
