= M&GN Class C =

British 4-4-0 tender steam locomotive

M&GN Class C; LNER Classes D52, D53 & D54
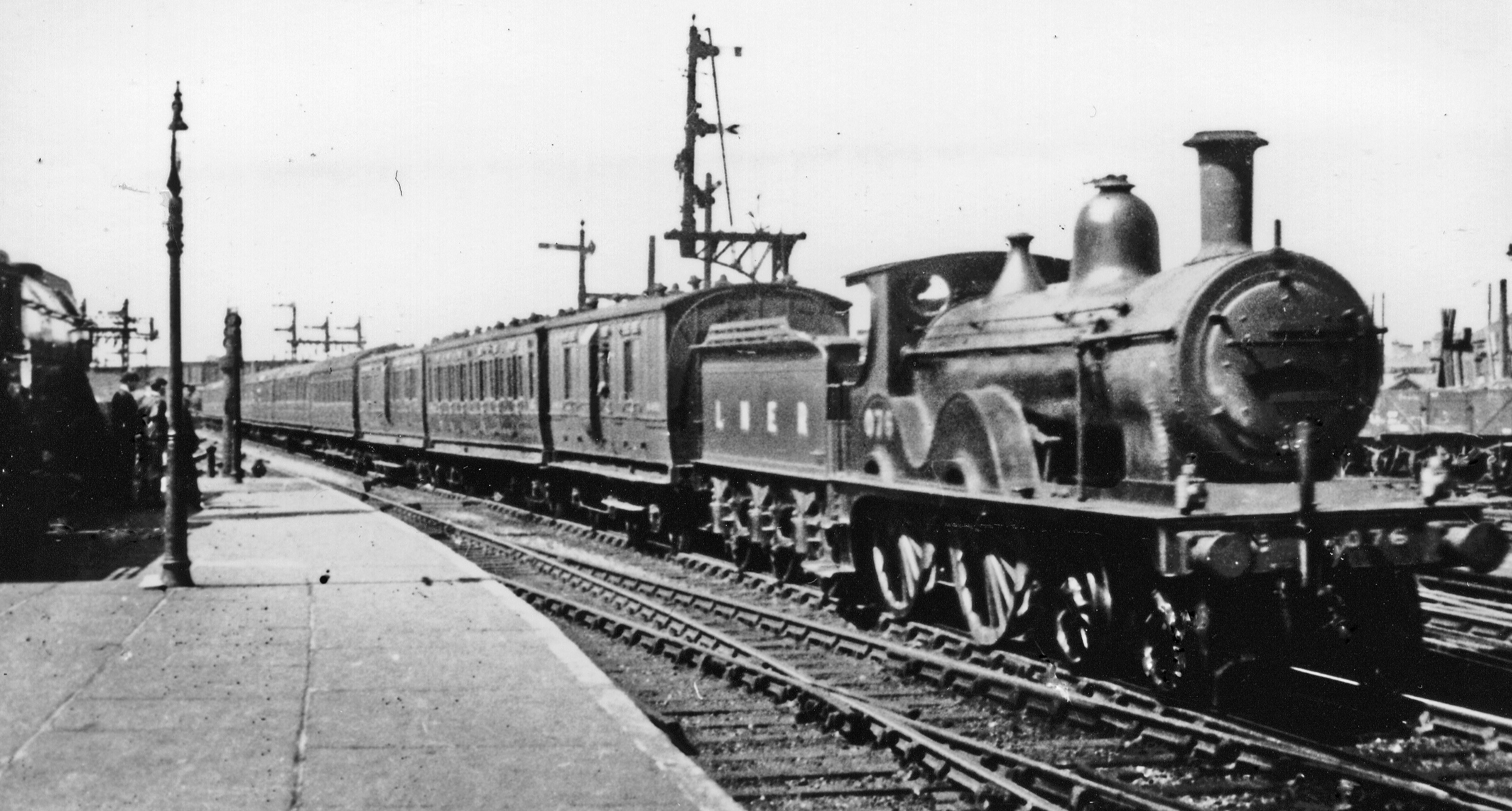
- M&GN class C 4-4-0, No. 076, at Peterborough North, 1938
Type and origin
- Power type: Steam
- Designer: S. W. Johnson
- Builder: Sharp, Stewart & Co.; Beyer, Peacock & Co.
- Serial number: SS: 3988–4013, 4190–6; BP: 4066–72
- Build date: May 1894–November 1899
- Total produced: 40
Specifications
- Configuration
  - Whyte: 4-4-0
- Gauge: 4 ft 8 1/2 in (1,435 mm)
- Leading dia.: 3 ft 3 1/2 in (1,003 mm)
- Driver dia.: 6 ft 6 1/2 in (1,994 mm)
- Wheelbase: 43 ft 4 1/4 in (13.214 m)
- Length: 52 ft 9 1/2 in (16.091 m)
- Loco weight: D52: 42.9 long tons (43.6 t); D53: 44.35 long tons (45.06 t); D54: 49.9 long tons (50.7 t)
- Tender weight: 33.55 long tons (34.09 t)
- Fuel type: Coal
- Fuel capacity: 3 long tons (3.0 t)
- Water cap.: 2,953 imp gal (13,420 L)
- Firebox
  - Grate area: D52, D53: 17.5 sq ft (1.63 m^{2}); D54: 21 sq ft (2.0 m^{2})
- Boiler pressure: D52, D53: 160 psi (1,100 kPa); D54: 175 psi (1,210 kPa)
- Heating surface: D52, D53: 1,078 sq ft (100.1 m^{2}); D54: 1,384 sq ft (128.6 m^{2})
- Cylinders: Two, inside
- Cylinder size: 18 1/2 by 26 inches (470 mm × 660 mm)
- Valve gear: Stephenson
- Valve type: slide valves
- Loco brake: Steam
- Train brakes: Vacuum
Performance figures
- Tractive effort: D52, D53: 15,416 lbf (68.57 kN); D54: 16,862 lbf (75.01 kN)
Career
- Operators: Midland and Great Northern Joint Railway; London and North Eastern Railway
- Class: M&GN: C; LNER: D52, D53, D54
- Axle load class: RA 4
- Withdrawn: November 1936–January 1945
- Disposition: All scrapped

The M&GN Class C was a class of 4-4-0 steam tender locomotives of the Midland and Great Northern Joint Railway.

== History ==
The Midland and Great Northern Joint Railway (M&GN) was formed in 1893. The M&GN possessed insufficient locomotives to work all of its services, and so a number of locomotives were loaned by the railway's two co-owners, the Great Northern Railway and the Midland Railway (MR). To avoid the necessity for such loans, the MR's Locomotive Superintendent, Samuel Waite Johnson, designed a class of 4-4-0 tender locomotives specifically for use on the M&GN. These had much in common with the MR's 1808 class, which had first appeared in 1888. 26 locomotives of the new design were built by Sharp, Stewart & Co. in 1894, with a further seven following in 1896; a final seven were built by Beyer, Peacock & Co. in 1899 bringing the total to 40. Their numbers on the M&GN were 1–7, 11–14, 17, 18, 36–39, 42–57, 74–80, and they formed M&GN Class C. Ten more were built to the same design by Beyer, Peacock in 1900, but these were for the MR, where they formed the 2581 class.

As built, the engines had round-topped fireboxes, and the boiler barrel had a maximum diameter of 4 ft 3 in (1.30 m). When boilers became due for replacement, the replacement boilers were of various types, some of which had Belpaire fireboxes, and some were larger, being 4 ft 9 in (1.45 m) diameter.

When they passed to the London and North Eastern Railway (LNER) on 1 October 1936, it was decided to add a zero prefix to their M&GN numbers, to avoid duplication with existing LNER engines, so M&GN no. 1 became LNER no. 01; but 14 locomotives were withdrawn before the prefix could be applied. The remaining 26 had their numbers altered between October 1936 and December 1937.

On the LNER they initially retained the M&GN class C, but this was soon subdivided into C/1, C/2 and C/3 according to boiler design. They were reclassified as D52, D53 and D54 in July 1942:

- C/1, D52 Round-top firebox
- C/2, D53 Small Belpaire firebox
- C/3, D54 Large Belpaire firebox

When the LNER post-war numbering scheme was prepared, it was based on the locomotive stock on 4 July 1943, by which time 19 more had been withdrawn, leaving seven: of these, class D52 nos. 038 & 076 were allotted 2050–1, class D53 nos. 050, 06 & 077 were to become 2052–4, and D54 nos. 055–6 were allotted 2055–6. However, by the time that the scheme was issued in December that year, a further four had been withdrawn, leaving just the three D53 in the final list; and before the renumbering actually began in January 1946, all three of those had also been withdrawn, the last in January 1945 None of the locomotives were preserved.
