= Samuel Walter Johnson Smith =

Samuel Walter Johnson Smith FRS (26 January 1871 – 20 August 1948) was an English physicist.

He studied Natural Sciences at Trinity College, Cambridge and became Professor of Physics at the University of Birmingham in 1919, where he succeeded J.H. Poynting.

He was the son of Walter Mackersie Smith and an elected Fellow of the Royal Society.
