= LMS Class 2P 4-4-0 =

British steam locomotive

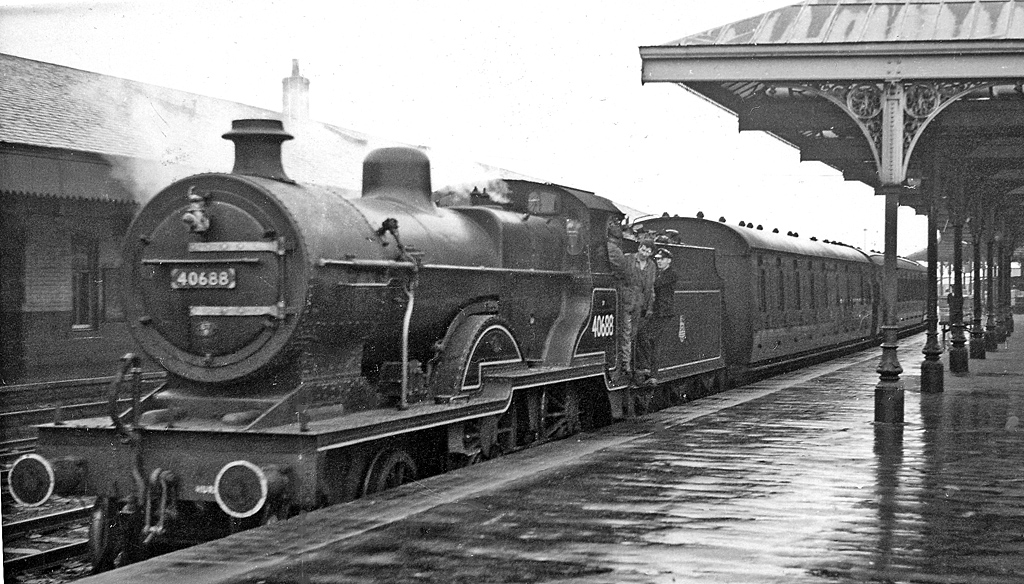
- 40688 at Kilmarnock
Type and origin
- Power type: Steam
- Designer: Henry Fowler
- Builder: LMS Derby Works (98); LMS Crewe Works (40)
- Build date: 1928–1932
- Total produced: 138
Specifications
- Configuration
  - Whyte: 4-4-0
  - UIC: 2′B h2
- Gauge: 4 ft 8 1/2 in (1,435 mm) standard gauge
- Leading dia.: 3 ft 6 1/2 in (1.080 m)
- Driver dia.: 6 ft 9 in (2.057 m)
- Length: 54 ft 4 in (16.56 m)
- Loco weight: 54.05 long tons (54.92 t; 60.54 short tons)
- Total weight: 96.25 long tons (97.79 t; 107.80 short tons)
- Fuel type: Coal
- Fuel capacity: 4 long tons (4.1 t; 4.5 short tons)
- Water cap.: 3,500 imp gal (16,000 L; 4,200 US gal)
- Firebox
  - Grate area: 21 sq ft (2.0 m^{2})
- Boiler: LMS type G7S
- Boiler pressure: 180 lbf/in^{2} (1.24 MPa)
- Heating surface
  - Firebox: 124 sq ft (11.5 m^{2})
  - Tubes: 1,034 sq ft (96.1 m^{2})
- Superheater
  - Heating area: 252 sq ft (23.4 m^{2}) later 246 sq ft (22.9 m^{2})
- Cylinders: Two, inside
- Cylinder size: 19 in × 26 in (483 mm × 660 mm)
- Valve gear: Stephenson
- Valve type: Piston valves
Performance figures
- Tractive effort: 17,730 lbf (78.87 kN)
Career
- Operators: London, Midland and Scottish Railway; →British Railways
- Power class: 2P
- Numbers: LMS: 563–700; BR: 40563–40700
- Withdrawn: 1934 (2), 1954–1962
- Disposition: All scrapped

The London, Midland and Scottish Railway Class 2P 4-4-0 was a class of steam locomotive designed for light passenger work.

== Overview ==
The class was introduced in 1928 and was a post-grouping development of the Midland Railway 483 Class with modified dimensions and reduced boiler mountings.

The numbering continued from where the Midland engines left off at 563 and eventually reached 700. 138 were built, though numbering is slightly complicated by renumberings and transfers.

== Details ==
Table of orders and numbers
Numbers			Lot No.	Date built	Built at	Notes
Original	2nd	BR	Lot No.	Date built	Built at	Notes
563–571	—	40563–40571	49	1928	Derby	
572	601	40601	49	1928	Derby	Experimentally fitted with Owen's double port exhaust valves from new and renumbered immediately after entering service
572	—	40572	49	1928	Derby	Replacement for first No. 572
573–574	—	40573–40574	49	1928	Derby	
575–576	633–634	40633–40634	49	1928	Derby	Transferred to S&DJR Nos 44–45 in 1928, retaken into LMS stock 1930
575–576	—	40575–40576	67	1929	Derby	Replacement for engines transferred to S&DJR
577–579	—	40577–40579	49	1928	Derby	
580	635	40635	49	1928	Derby	Transferred to S&DJR No. 46 in 1928, retaken into LMS stock 1930.
580	—	40580	67	1929	Derby	Replacement for engine transferred to S&DJR
581–600	—	40581–40600	49	1928	Derby	
602–612	—	40602–40612	49	1928	Derby	
613–628	—	40613–40627	67	1929	Derby	
629–632	—	40629–40632	67	1930	Derby	
636–660	—	40636–40660	76	1931	Crewe	
661–665	—	40661–40665	77	1931	Derby	
666–685	—	40666–40685	77	1932	Derby	
686–700	—	40686–40700	85	1932	Crewe	

Numbers 633 and 653 were fitted with Dabeg feedwater heater in 1933. Numbers 591 and 639 were withdrawn in 1934 after being heavily damaged in an accident at Port Eglinton Junction near Cumberland Street Station, Glasgow on 6 September of the same year. After nationalisation in 1948, British Railways added 40000 to the numbers of the remaining 136 engines. Further withdrawals came between 1954 and 1962. All were scrapped.

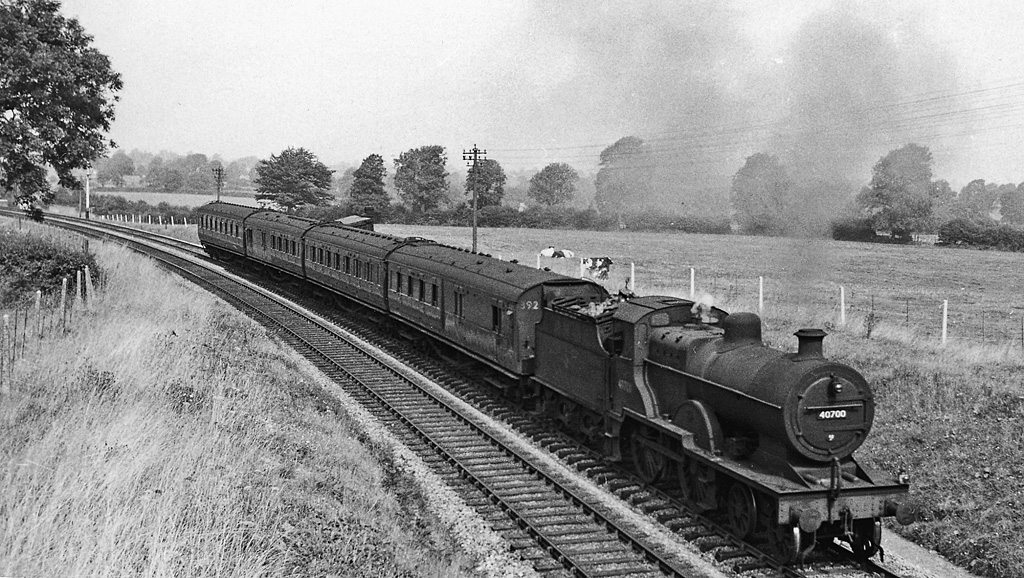
No. 40700 at Masbury Summit on a Somerset and Dorset train from Bath (Green Park) to Templecombe on 22 August 1959

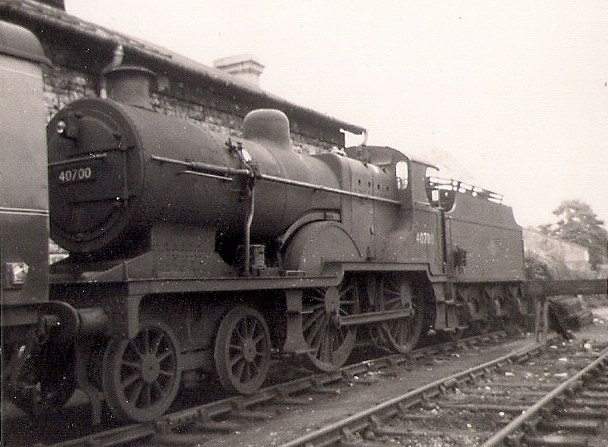
No. 40700 at Bath Green Park Depot on 25 July 1961. Withdrawn September 1962 and scrapped at Derby works in December 1962

Table of withdrawals
Year	Number in service at start of year	Number withdrawn	Locomotive numbers
1934	138	2	591, 639.
1954	136	1	40662.
1957	135	1	40676.
1959	134	43	40565/67–68/73/76/82/87/89–90/94/98–601/05–08/10–11/16–17/33/36/44/49/53–56/58/60/66–67/73–75/77/79–80/88/93/99.
1960	91	10	40581/83–84/88, 40630–31/52/71/90/98.
1961	81	66	40566/69–72/74–75/77–80/85–86/92–93/95–97, 40602–04/09/12–15/18–29/32/35/37/40–43/45/47–48/50–51/59/61/63/68–69/78/82–87/89/91–92/95.
1962	15	15	40563–64, 40634/38/46/57/64–65/70/72/81/94/96–97, 40700.

== Models ==
Hornby produce a 00 gauge model based on the old Dapol (formerly Airfix) tooling which is reasonably accurate. Graham Farish produced an N gauge model of the 4P 4-4-0 Compound when they were in Poole, Dorset, and the chassis for this could be modified to represent the 2P. Union Mills on the Isle of Man make a 2P in N gauge.
