= Midland Railway 483 Class =

Class of steam locomotives

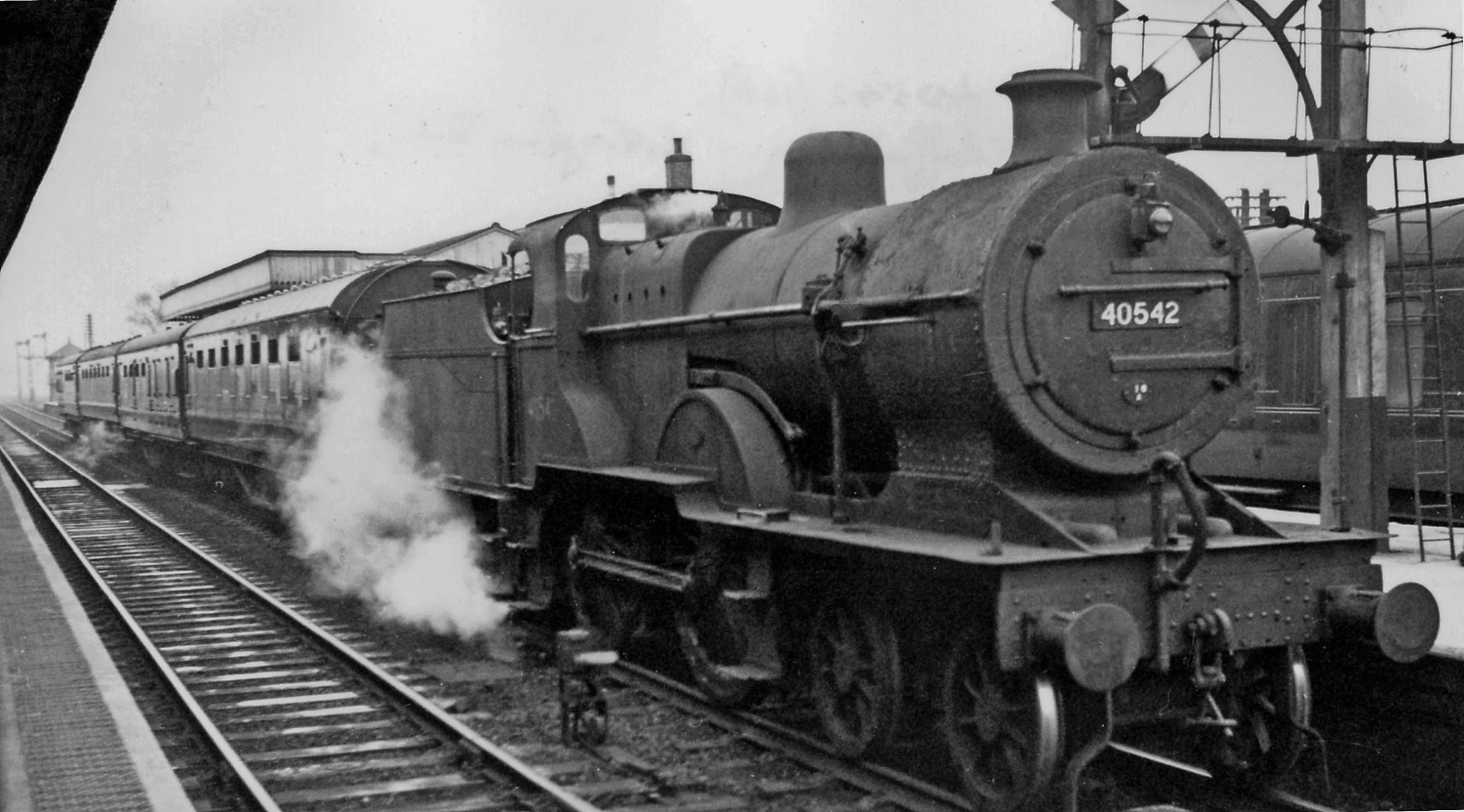
- Rebuilt Midland Johnson 2P 4-4-0 No. 40542 at Chesterfield 1959
Type and origin
- Power type: Steam
- Designer: Samuel W. Johnson
- Builder: Derby Works
- Build date: Midland locos built 1882–1901; S&DJ locos built 1914–1921
Specifications
- Configuration
  - Whyte: 4-4-0
- Gauge: 4 ft 8 1/2 in (1,435 mm) standard gauge
- Driver dia.: Original, 6 ft 6.5 in (1.994 m); Rebuilt, 7 ft 0.5 in (2.146 m)
- Loco weight: 53 long tons 7 cwt (119,500 lb or 54.2 t)
- Fuel type: Coal
- Boiler pressure: 160 psi (1,100 kPa)
- Cylinders: Two inside
- Cylinder size: Original, 18 in × 26 in (460 mm × 660 mm); Rebuilt, 20.5 in × 26 in (520 mm × 660 mm)
Performance figures
- Tractive effort: Original: 15,960 lbf (71.0 kN); Rebuilt: 17,585 lbf (78.22 kN)
Career
- Operators: Midland Railway, London Midland and Scottish Railway, British Railways
- Power class: LMS/BR 2P
- Number in class: 165
- Withdrawn: 1950–1959
- Disposition: All scrapped

The Midland Railway 483 Class 4-4-0 was a class of steam-driven locomotive designed by Henry Fowler for passenger work on the Midland Railway. The class were nominally "rebuilds" of various earlier classes designed by Samuel W. Johnson, although "the '483' class engines were, unquestionably, 'accountancy rebuilds' (effectively new locos 'disguised' to gain routine expenditure approval from the board)". This design formed the basis for the later LMS Class 2P 4-4-0.

Construction of the first batch was authorised by Midland Railway Order O/3942 dated 21 June 1911: "'Please put your work in hand in connection with rebuilding engines 483–522 with new frames, new cylinders and G7 boilers fitted with Schmidt's superheaters.' Apart from the savings made by using the parts that were salvaged from the old engines, there was an added benefit in referring to them as rebuilt since the royalties due to the superheater company were lower for modified locomotives than for new ones." This first batch of locomotives previously formed the 156 class. Their rebuilding to Class 483 took place 1912-1913.

Four more batches of rebuilds were authorised; in 1912, 1913, 1914 and 1922. The London, Midland and Scottish Railway (LMS) inherited these locomotives at the Grouping of the railways in 1923, completing the last of these rebuilds in 1924. Some of them entered British Railways (BR) ownership in 1948 but all were scrapped from 1950 to 1959.

== Numbering ==
- BR numbers 40332-40397 (17 locomotives) originally built 1882–1891, some rebuilt from 1910 onwards
- BR numbers 40400-40562 (143 locomotives) originally built 1891–1901, all rebuilt between 1912 and 1923
- BR numbers 40322-40326 (5 locomotives) built for Somerset and Dorset Joint Railway 1914-1921 and taken into LMS stock in 1930

Note: two of the above number series contain gaps so the totals do not tally.

== Rebuilding ==
On rebuilding, the Stephenson valve gear was retained but the following changes were made:

- 18 in × 26 in (460 mm × 660 mm) cylinders with slide valves were replaced by 20.5 in × 26 in (520 mm × 660 mm) cylinders with piston valves.
- 6 ft 6.5 in (1.994 m) driving wheels were replaced by 7 ft 0.5 in (2.146 m) driving wheels.
- A superheater was fitted.

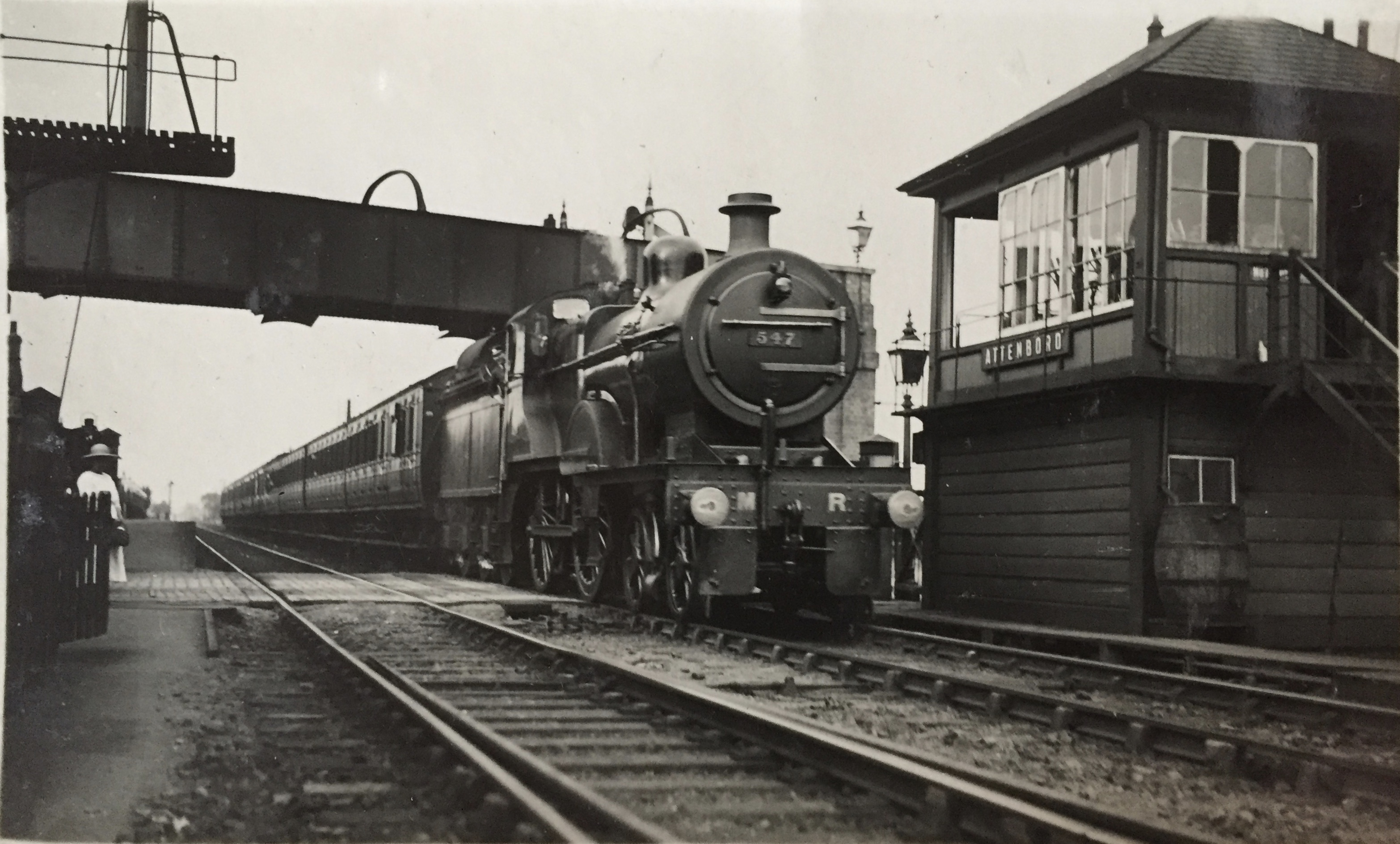
