= Compound locomotive =

Type of railroad steam engine

A compound locomotive is a steam locomotive which is powered by a compound engine, a type of steam engine where steam is expanded in two or more stages. The locomotive was only one application of compounding. Two and three stages were used in ships, for example.

Compounding became popular for railway locomotives from the early 1880s and by the 1890s were becoming common. Large numbers were constructed, mostly two- and four-cylinder compounds, in Germany, Austria, Hungary, and the United States. It declined in popularity due to a perceived increased maintenance requirement. Nonetheless, compound Mallets were built by the Norfolk and Western Railway up to 1952 and continued to be designed and built in France until the end of steam in the 1970's. French compound engines became highly developed, eventually incorporating reheaters between the high and low pressure stages as well as the initial use of superheaters, ultimately achieving the highest power-to-weight ratio and highest horsepower to fire grate-area ratio of any steam locomotives ever built.

== Introduction ==
In the usual arrangement for a compound engine the steam is first expanded in one or two high-pressure (HP) cylinders, then having given up some heat and lost some pressure, it exhausts into a larger-volume low-pressure (LP) cylinder, (or two, - or more), thus extending the expansion part of the thermodynamic cycle. The cylinders can be said to work in "series" as opposed to the normal arrangement of a simple-expansion locomotive where they work in "parallel". In order to balance piston thrusts of a compound, the HP:LP cylinder volume ratio has to be carefully determined, usually by increasing the LP cylinder diameter and/or by lengthening the stroke. In non-condensing engines, the HP:LP volume ratio is usually 1:2.25. On geared locomotives, cylinder volumes can be kept more or less identical by increasing LP piston speed. Compound may refer to any multiple-expansion engine. Added insight comes with the terms double, triple, quadruple. At least three triple-expansion locomotives were built; A vertical boiler, high- pressure 0-4-0 made by Greenwood & Batley in 1878, a 2-2-2 converted from a double expansion locomotive by Francis Webb of the London and North Western Railway and an experimental 4-8-0, named the L.F.Loree, which was built by the American Locomotive Company and the Delaware & Hudson Railroad in 1933.

== Reasons for compounding ==
The main benefits sought from compounding are reduced fuel and water consumption plus higher power/weight ratio due to more expansion in the cylinder before the exhaust valve opens, which gives a higher efficiency; additional advantages include smoother torque and in many cases, superior riding qualities with consequent less wear on the track and running gear. Where heavy grades and low axle loads were combined, the compound locomotive was often deemed to be the most viable solution.

Even more than other locomotives, designing a compound locomotive demands a firm grasp of thermo- and fluid dynamics. A lack of these led to many less-than-optimal designs, especially in the early years of the 20th century. Compound designs' long steam cycle made them particularly sensitive to temperature-drop and condensation of the steam during its lengthy passage. In rebuilding older locomotives from 1929 onwards, André Chapelon was able to inexpensively obtain what seemed almost "magical" improvements in power and economy by improving flow through the steam circuit, at the same time putting in a larger superheater to increase the initial steam temperature and delay condensation in the LP cylinders.

To prevent severe condensation taking place, the L.N.E.R. applied resuperheat to their water-tube boilered No. 10,000 to make up for inadequate HP superheat. The Paris-Orleans Railway designed a demonstrator 2-12-0 locomotive, No. 160-A1 (tested 1948-51), with resuperheat between HP and LP stages. They also fitted steam jackets to both HP/LP cylinders for what was believed by Chapelon to be the first time for a compound locomotive. Resuperheating was also by Porta on his prototype 4-8-0 rebuild: 'La Argentina' (tested around the same time in Argentina).

Proponents of simple expansion argue that use of early cut-off in the cylinder thus expanding small quantities of steam at each piston stroke obviates the need for the complication and initial expense of compounding and indeed multi-cylinder single expansion – this is an ongoing debate.

== Compound configurations ==
There are many configurations, but two basic types can be defined, according to how HP and LP piston strokes are phased and hence whether the HP exhaust is able to pass directly from HP to LP (Woolf compounds) or whether pressure fluctuations necessitate an intermediate "buffer" space in the form of a steam chest or pipe known as a receiver (receiver compounds).

The eternal problem with compounds is starting: for all cylinders to take their weight, it is advisable to have some way of short-circuiting the HP cylinders and getting steam at a reduced pressure directly to the LP cylinders; hence many of the patented compound systems are associated with particular starting arrangements. The de Glehn 4-cylinder system is probably still the most sophisticated of all with independent HP & LP cut-off and a rotary valve, called a lanterne allowing independent working or combinations of HP and LP groups. Most other systems employ starting valves of various kinds. Another criterion is whether the valve gears of the two groups are wholly independent or linked together in some way.

=== Configurations ===
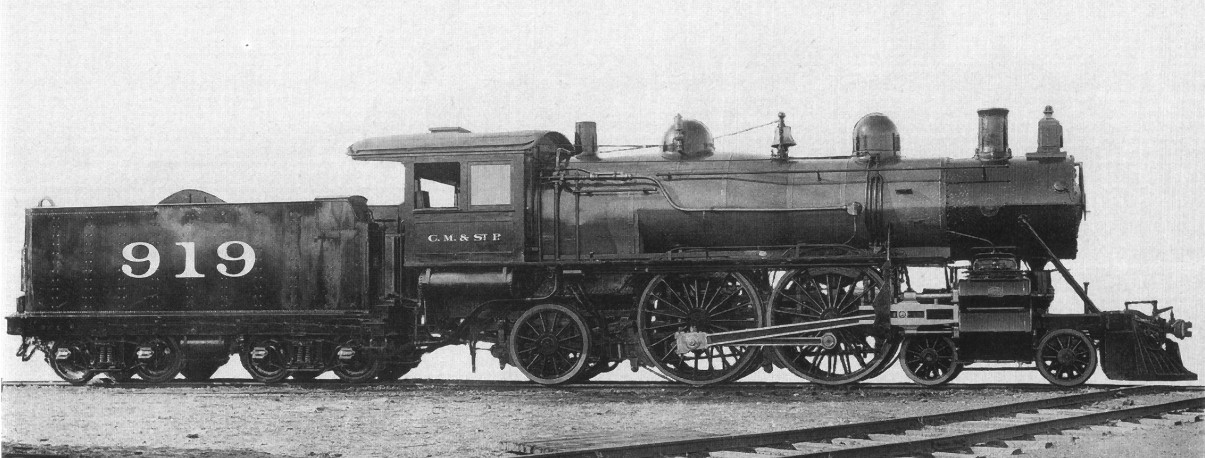
Vauclain four-cylinder compound locomotive Milwaukee Road class A2 No. 919.

=== Two-cylinder compound ===
- 2 cylinders, alternating high and low pressure - "continuous expansion locomotive" (Samuel/Nicholson)
- 1 high-pressure, 1 low-pressure - these are usually referred to as "cross-compound" designs, and there are many variations (Mallet-1; Vauclain; Von Borries-1; Lindner; Gölsdorf-1; Herdner)

=== Three-cylinder compound ===
- 2 high pressure, 1 low pressure (Francis William Webb)
- 1 high pressure, 2 low pressure (Sauvage; Klose; Weyermann; Walter Mackersie Smith; Samuel Waite Johnson; Richard Deeley; André Chapelon, Livio Dante Porta.)

=== Three-cylinder semi-compound ===
- 1 high pressure, 2 low pressure; HP from HP boiler superheated, LP from HP exhaust mixed with LP boiler superheated (Canadian Pacific)

=== Three-cylinder triple-expansion ===
- 1 high pressure, 1 medium pressure, 1 low pressure (Greenwood & Batley, Livio Dante Porta [proposed])

=== Four-cylinder triple-expansion compound ===
- 1 high pressure, 1 intermediate pressure, 2 low pressure (LF Loree)

=== Four-cylinder compound ===
- 2 high pressure, 2 low pressure (de Glehn; Barbier; Von Borries-2; Golsdorf-2; Vauclain-1&2, Mallet and Meyer articulated locomotives)

=== Six-cylinder compound ===
- 2 high pressure, 4 low pressure (Chapelon)

These can be staggered with drive to more than one axle, in line concentrated on one axle or in tandem with HP and LP driving a common crank, the latter system being much employed in the US in the early years of the 20th Century, notably on the Santa Fe.

== History ==
=== Early experiments ===
Jonathan Hornblower, the grandson of one of Newcomen's engine erectors in Cornwall, patented a double-cylinder compound reciprocating beam engine in 1781. He was prevented from developing it further by James Watt, who claimed his own patents were infringed.

A method to lessen the magnitude of the continual heating and cooling of a single-expansion steam engine that leads to inefficiency was invented in 1804 by British engineer Arthur Woolf. Woolf patented his stationary Woolf high-pressure compound engine in 1805.

=== Application to railway locomotives ===
The first design of a compound railway locomotive on record belongs to Thomas Craddock, who patented a design for a condensing compound locomotive in 1846.

In 1850 United Kingdom patent number 13029 was awarded to James Samuel, the engineer of the Eastern Counties Railway, for a "continuous expansion locomotive", a method of steam locomotive compounding, although the idea appears to have come from one John Nicholson, a driver on the line. In this system, the two cylinders alternated as high and low pressure, with the change-over occurring halfway through each stroke. Two locomotives, one passenger and one goods, were converted to the system but no further examples followed.

Whether the above locomotive is, strictly speaking, a compound is subject to debate: the first recognisable compound application to a locomotive was on Erie Railway's No 122, an ordinary American type fitted in 1867 with tandem compound cylinders following J.F. Lay's patent no. 70341. Nothing is known of this locomotive's subsequent career and it does not appear to have been reproduced.

=== Cross Compound ===
The simplest form of the compound locomotive has two cylinders, a high-pressure cylinder on one side, and a low-pressure on the other side; the name reflects the steam flow from the HP to the LP across the locomotive. Most early attempts at compound locomotives were variations on the cross compound design, some notable ones being that of Baxter (1870) and Hudson (1873). Another was by Anatole Mallet who introduced in 1876 a series of small 2-cylinder compound 0-4-2 tank locomotives for the Bayonne-Anglet-Biarritz Railway. These were entirely successful and worked for many years.

Cross compound locomotives have a fundamental design issue, which is that if the HP cylinder is stopped "on center", the locomotive cannot start. To resolve this, all practical cross compound locomotives have some form of starting valve, which allows admission of HP steam into the LP cylinder on starting. In some cases this is manually operated by the locomotive driver, while in other cases it is automatic; in the latter case the valve is often referred to as an "intercepting valve". The primary difference between various forms of cross compound locomotives is in the design and operation of the intercepting valve.

A second design issue of cross compound locomotives is that, if the engine is worked on a short cutoff, the steam is fully expanded in the HP cylinder and does no work in the LP cylinder, which causes unequal stresses in the engine. This problem is avoided if the engine has 3 or 4 cylinders, which was an element driving the development of the following types.

=== Mallet ===
Mallet also worked out schemes for compounds with independent divided drive for HP and LP, some with a single rigid chassis that were never built, others with a rigid rear chassis on which the HP cylinders were mounted and an articulated LP front engine unit. The latter arrangement was adopted worldwide. The first application was a series of 600 mm (1 ft 11 5/8 in) gauge locomotives specially built by the Decauville Company for the Paris Exposition of 1889; the design was introduced to the North American railroading in 1900 with B&O No. 2400, and rapidly became popular there. US practice progressed to the "simple Mallet", which used the same articulated arrangement but eliminated the compounding. Both simple and compound Mallet locomotives lasted to the end of steam.

=== Webb ===
Mallet's aforementioned rigid wheelbase divided-drive schemes, although never actually applied, may have inspired Francis Webb in Britain. After trials with an old single-driver converted into a 2-cylinder compound in 1878, he introduced in 1882 his first Experiment class with similar divided-drive: 3-cylinder compounds with uncoupled driving wheels in which two small outside high-pressure cylinders exhausted into one large low-pressure one between the frames. Other similar classes followed, progressively enlarged. The uncoupled driving wheels were problematic as the two pairs of wheels could be rotating in opposite directions on starting, if a locomotive had previously backed onto its train. The arrangement appears to have been adopted due to lack of space, but Tuplin has pointed out that if Walschaert's valve gear had been fitted, the driving wheels could have been coupled in the normal way.

Wheel arrangements varied: 2-2-2-0, 2-2-2-2, 2-2-2-2T, 2-2-4-0T and 0-8-0; the last were freight locomotives and the only ones of this type to have all wheels coupled. Webb's next stage consisted of two classes of 4-cylinder compound 4-4-0s one 4-6-0 type and finally more 0-8-0s The latter are considered to have been the most successful Webb compounds and some lasted in their original condition into the 1920s.

=== Vauclain ===
In 1889 Samuel M. Vauclain of the Baldwin Locomotive Works devised the Vauclain compound locomotive. This design used a double-expansion engine fitted into the space occupied by a conventional single-expansion engine on the locomotive, using a single piston valve with conventional gear to control both the high- and low-pressure cylinders. The high-pressure cylinder could be placed above or below the low-pressure cylinder, each had its own piston rod connected to a common crosshead, so that one connecting rod and crank was required for each pair of cylinders. Substantial fuel efficiencies were achieved, but maintenance difficulties doomed the type. Most were converted to conventional engines.

=== Tandem ===
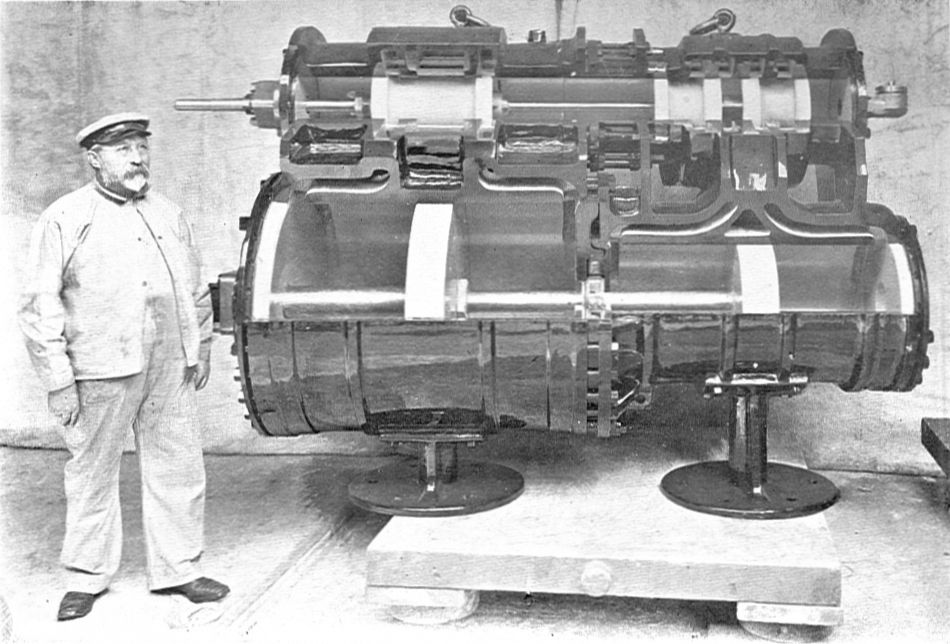
Cutaway view of the cylinders (low-pressure on left, high-pressure on right) and valves (above) on a tandem compound engine

The tandem compound first appeared on the Erie Railroad in 1867. Like the Vauclain compound, a tandem compound has each pair of high- and low-pressure cylinders driving a common crosshead, connecting rod and crank; but unlike the Vauclain compound, the cylinders are mounted fore and aft of each other. The rear wall of the forward cylinder is usually the forward wall of the rear cylinder. The piston rod of the rear cylinder is connected to the crosshead in the usual way, but the forward cylinder may have its piston rod, or rods, in either of two forms: either the piston rod of the rear cylinder is extended forwards to also carry the forward piston; or if the forward cylinder be the low-pressure cylinder (and thus larger in diameter than the high-pressure cylinder behind), it may have two long piston rods which pass above and below, or to either side, of the high-pressure cylinder in order to reach the common crosshead.

In Great Britain, there were three tandem compounds. The first was no. 224 of the North British Railway which was built in 1871 as a 4-4-0 simple-expansion locomotive, being the pioneer of the 224 Class; it was converted to a tandem compound in 1885, but reverted to simple in 1887. As a compound, the high-pressure cylinders were 13 inches (330 mm) diameter, placed in front of the low-pressure cylinders, which were 20 in (510 mm) diameter; the common stroke was 24 in (610 mm). The other two were both 2-4-0s on the Great Western Railway (GWR) – no. 7, built in February 1886 for the standard gauge, and no. 8 built in May 1886 for the broad gauge. No. 7 had high-pressure cylinders 15 in (380 mm) diameter, low-pressure 23 in (580 mm). The cylinders of no. 8 were slightly smaller: high-pressure 14 in (360 mm), low-pressure 22 in (560 mm). In both GWR locomotives, the low-pressure cylinders were in front, and the stroke was 21 in (530 mm). No. 7 ceased work in 1887, being dismantled in 1890; no. 8 never entered regular service, failing when on trial - it was partially dismantled in 1892. Both locomotives were renewed in 1894 as standard gauge simple-expansion 4-4-0s.

Tandem compound locomotives were very common in the United States prior to WW1, with some railroads such as the Santa Fe having large numbers in several wheel arrangements. A characteristic feature of larger tandem compound locomotives was an "A-frame" crane mounted on each side of the smokebox, to allow removing the front cylinder (typically the LP cylinder) when the rear cylinder required service.

=== De Glehn ===
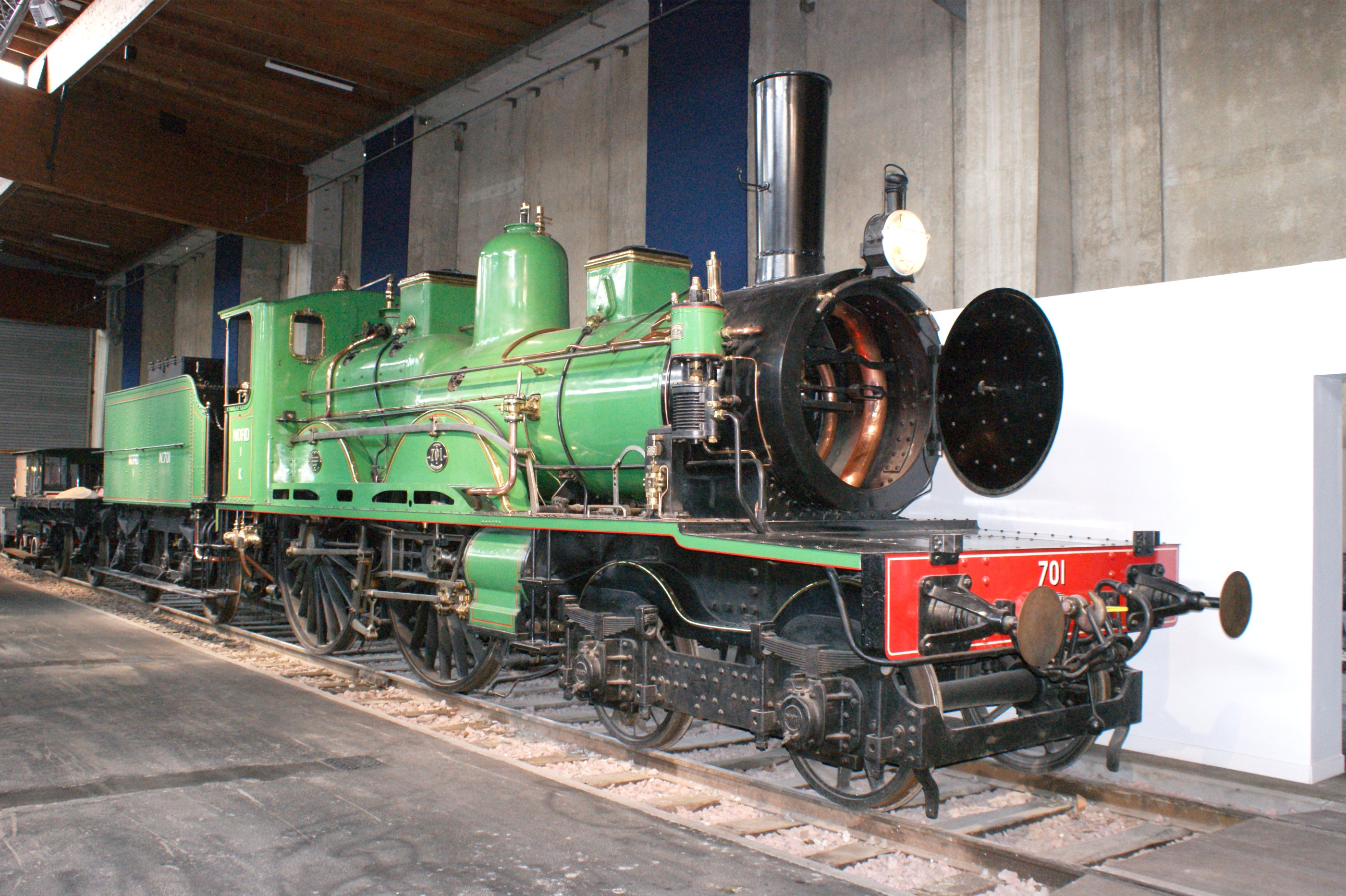
Nord 701, now a 4-2-2-0

A type long-familiar on French railways was the 4-cylinder de Glehn compound. The prototype, Nord 701, was designed by Alfred de Glehn, an engineer at the Société Alsacienne de Constructions Mécaniques (SACM), and ordered by Gaston du Bousquet, chief engineer of the Nord Railway. It was initially built as a rigid-framed 1AA / 2-2-2-0 but later rebuilt with a pivoting bogie as a 2′AA / 4-2-2-0 and is still preserved in that condition. It had a 4-cylinder layout with the driving wheels uncoupled, and bore a superficial resemblance to a Webb compound, except that inside HP cylinders drove the leading driving axle whilst the LP cylinders were outside, driving the trailing axle. In 1891 two production locomotives, Nord 2.121 and 2.122, were placed in service with the cylinder positions inverted at du Bousquet's insistence, that is outside HP and inside LP. One of these initially had uncoupled driving axles as before but this arrangement proved inferior to the coupled version. Sixty were built in all.

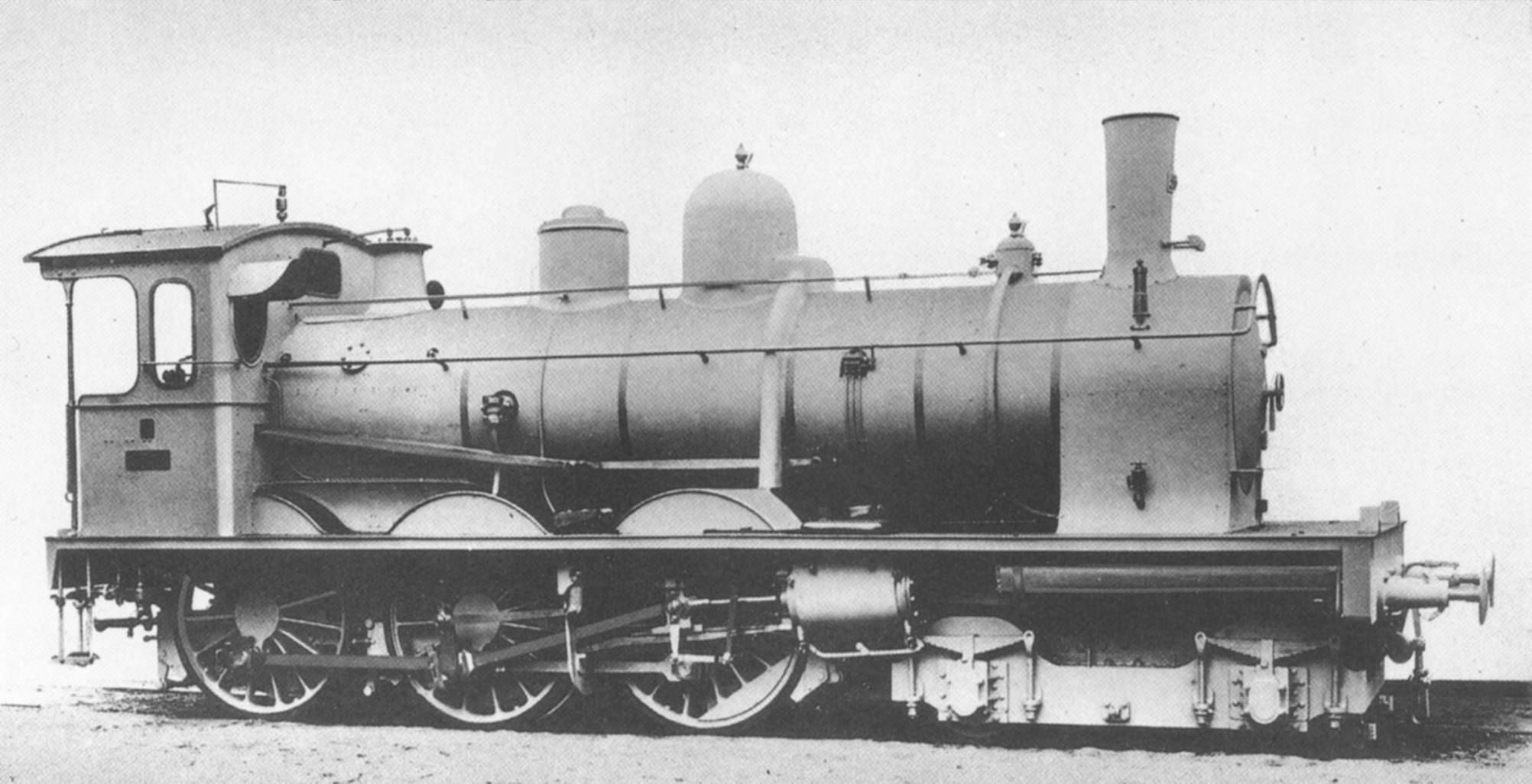
Typical early de Glehn's locomotive (Baden IV e of 1894), with high-pressure cylinders placed behind a front bogie, and driving the second set of wheels.

The type was greatly improved by du Bousquet who refined the layout of rods and valve gear along the inside of the frames for easy access. Later he had studies made of steam passages to reduce throttling which paved the way for Chapelon's work 27 years later. This turned into a very efficient layout copied by many railroads in France, Belgium, Germany, and England.

As such, the de Glehn type was built in large numbers in France, in various wheel arrangements, for service at home and abroad; a number were also built in Germany and Belgium. Many gave long service: a 4-6-0 230.D locomotive introduced 1909, stationed at Creil could often still be seen at the Gare du Nord, Paris in the late 1960s.

Three of the 4-4-2 type were purchased by the Great Western Railway, one in 1903 and two slightly larger ones in 1905 under its Locomotive Superintendent George Jackson Churchward for use in comparative trials and were tested against his own designs. For comparison with the later de Glehn compounds, the 4-cylinder simple 4-4-2 locomotive no. 40 North Star was specially built. Although a number of items of French practice were adopted by the Great Western as a result of these trials, the de Glehn compound system was not one of them. In 1904 The Pennsylvania railroad ordered a copy of the Nord Atlantic called "the French aristocrat" on the Pennsy, but too light which made her underpowered due to low traction. It was scrapped in 1912.

In New Zealand the locally built NZR A class of 1906 and the NZR X class of 1908 were de Glehn compounds, though mostly later converted to simple superheated locomotives (and the A class to 2 cylinders only).

In Russia, from 1906 the Putilov Company (later the Kirov Plant) built the 4-cylinder Class U locomotive. The 2 high-pressure cylinders were placed outside the frames, and the 2 low-pressure cylinders are placed inside the frames. One class U survives U-127. It is preserved at the Museum of the Moscow Railway.

The North British Locomotive Company of Glasgow built de Glehn compounds for the Bengal Nagpur Railway of India in 1906, which were very successful and economical on water. Further enlarged engines were built in 1929.

=== Plancher ===
In 1900 the Italian engineer Enrico Plancher developed a new and curious design of compound engine, which first appeared on the Rete Adriatica 500 class express locomotive; it was notable for being an asymmetrical four-cylinder design, in which the two HP and the two LP cylinders were grouped together, with each couple being served by a single piston valve which admitted steam simultaneously to the opposite ends of the two cylinders. The prototype of the class was presented at the International Railway Congress of 1900 in Paris and was looked at with interest, while not meeting with outstanding success; however, on the long run the asymmetrical design, while simple, proved to be rather awkward, as it was difficult to equalize the work of each side of the locomotive and this caused hunting. The Plancher engine was used again on some Ferrovie dello Stato designs like the FS Class 680 express locomotives and the FS Class 470 heavy freight locomotives, but no further application was approved after the widespread adoption of the superheater.

=== Chapelon ===
André Chapelon's celebrated abovementioned rebuilds from 1929 onwards were mostly of de Glehn compounds. Chapelon, along with other French engineers such as Gaston du Bousquet, and Marc de Caso brought these locomotives to their highest pinnacles of performance.

Maffei in Munich also built a large proportion of the German 4-cylinder compounds (such as the S 3/6), mostly on von Borries's later system. In spite of a sweeping standardisation policy by the Reichsbahn imposing simple expansion, a small but consequent number of Maffei Pacifics of a design dating from 1908 were nevertheless considered indispensable for hilly routes with severe axle load limitations and were built new as late as 1931.

=== Porta ===
Livio Dante Porta in 1948 drew inspiration from Chapelon's 4700/240P rebuilds for "Argentina"; his first production, a 4-cylinder compound rebuilt from an old British-built metre-gauge Pacific into a futuristic 4-8-0.

=== Sauvage ===
Another historically important, albeit less numerous configuration also had its origins in France: the three-cylinder compound with two outside LP set at 90° fed by one HP cylinder between the frames with the crank set 135° from the others. It was first incorporated into a prototype for the French Nord Railway in 1887 to the design of Edouard Sauvage. Nord 3.101 remained a solitary example but nonetheless put in 42 years' service.

=== Smith, Johnson, Deeley ===
On the British North Eastern Railway there appeared in 1898 a prototype 4-4-0 compound locomotive, no. 1619 (NER Class 3CC) with this same layout to the design of Walter Mackersie Smith (this itself being rebuilt from an earlier Worsdell/Von Borries 2-cylinder compound prototype of 1893). This formed the basis for an initial batch of five Midland Railway 1000 Class locomotives designed by Samuel Waite Johnson for the Midland Railway. These were followed from 1905 onwards by 40 of an enlarged production version where all the Smith fittings were replaced by a simplified starting arrangement incorporated into the regulator; this to the design of Johnson's successor, Richard Deeley. The original Johnson locomotives were rebuilt as Deeley compounds from 1914 onwards and were superheated.

After the formation of the London, Midland and Scottish Railway in 1923, and after comparative trials against locomotives of the constituent companies, the Midland compound was deemed the best and adopted in a slightly modified version, the LMS Compound 4-4-0, from 1925 to 1932 as the LMS standard class 4 express locomotive reaching a final total of 245 locomotives. The LMS locomotives were not universally appreciated especially on the old LNWR section where they went hand in hand with operating methods imposed by the Midland Railway constituent but in Scotland they were received as the solution to serious endemic express locomotive problems and were generally well liked.

Five larger 3-cylinder locomotives were built to the same general pattern by Beyer, Peacock and Company to the design of G.T. Glover for the Great Northern Railway (Ireland) in 1932 for the Dublin-Belfast expresses. Preserved examples are the rebuilt prototype Midland Compound, 1000 (BR 41000), and Great Northern Railway (Ireland) no. 85 Merlin.

=== Weymann ===
From 1896, Weymann introduced a 3-cylinder 2-6-0 type with divided drive and cranks at 120° for service on the heavily graded Swiss Jura-Simplon routes; eventually they numbered 147 units.

== Unrealised locomotive projects ==
Chapelon's aborted post-war locomotive replacement programme included a whole range of 3-cylinder Sauvage compounds. The only one to come into existence was 242A 1, a 4-8-4 prototype rebuilt in 1946 from an unsuccessful 4-8-2 3-cylinder simple. 242A 1 was probably the most important compound locomotive of all time, capable of developing a remarkable 5,300 cylinder horsepower (4,000 kW) for an engine unit weighing just 145.6 metric tons. One of the most efficient steam locomotives ever built, coal consumption was just 850 g/hp (1.1 g/W) per hour and water consumption was 6.45 L/hp (8.6 mL/W) per hour at 3,000 hp (2,200 kW). A typical simple-expansion locomotive could consume approximately double these amounts to generate the same output.

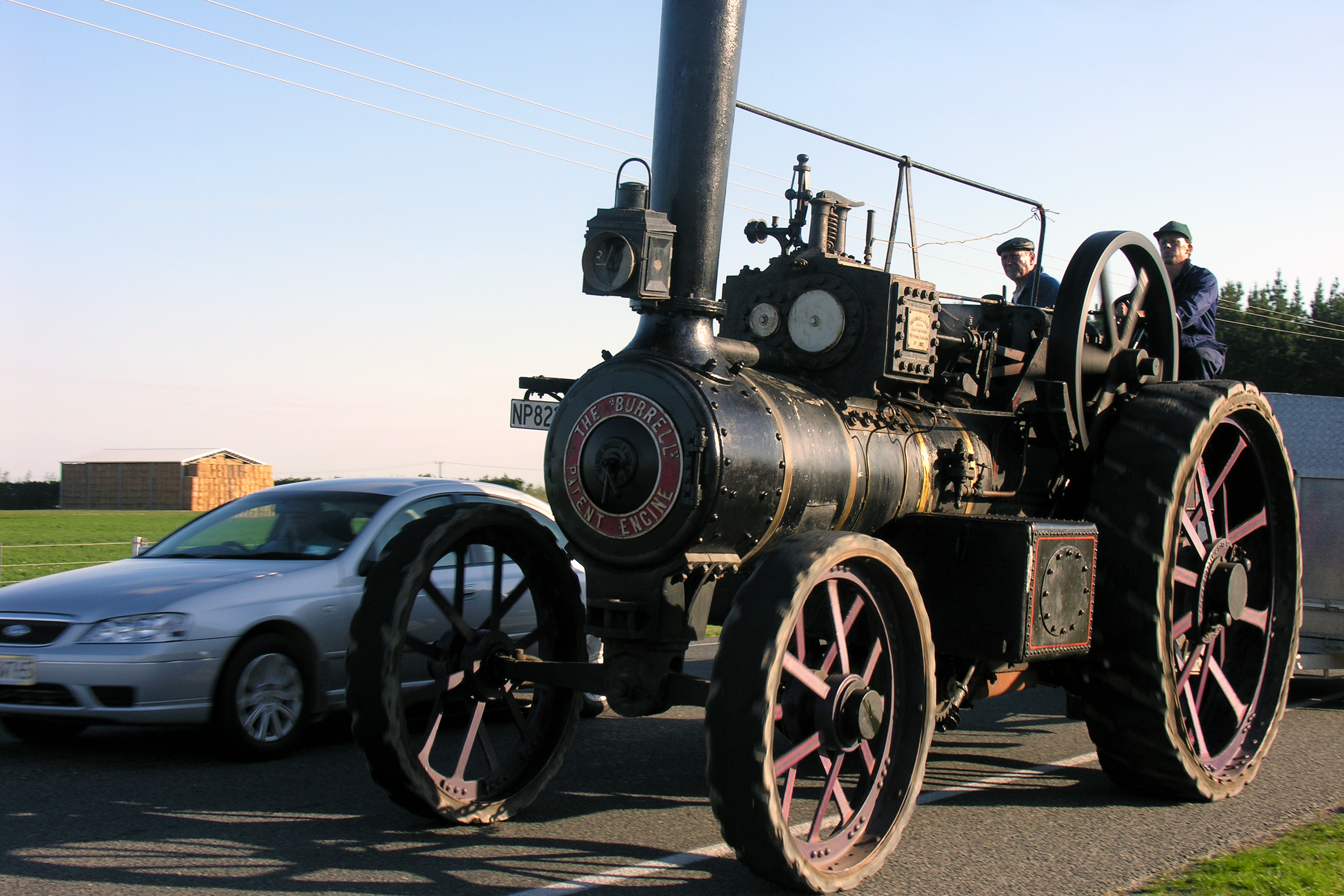
Burrell road locomotive, showing high- and low-pressure cylinders.

A layout with more or less 120° crank setting (the final setting was to be empirically determined) with HP cylinder placed on the left-hand side was fully developed by the Argentinian engineer L.D. Porta for new-built modern steam locomotives all of which would have used multiple expansion, some following this 3-cylinder compound system. These included locomotives of the 2-10-0 wheel arrangement, one of which was intended for fast freight work in the US, this being a high-pressure triple-expansion machine. Strange as this layout may seem, it had a number of advantages from the point of view of equalising piston thrusts and arrangement of steam passages. It was claimed that with proper maintenance and operating procedures, such locomotives could compete with modern forms of traction. Other projects were for small 2-cylinder compounds: notably a locomotive for sugar plantations in Cuba, burning bagasse.

== Road locomotives ==
In Britain, compounding was much more widely used on road locomotives (steam rollers, traction engines and steam lorries) than on rail. The usual arrangement was one high-pressure cylinder and one low-pressure cylinder (double crank compound), however a superposed Vauclain-style single crank compound type did exist.
