= LMS Compound 4-4-0 =

British class of steam locomotive

LMS 4P Compound 4-4-0
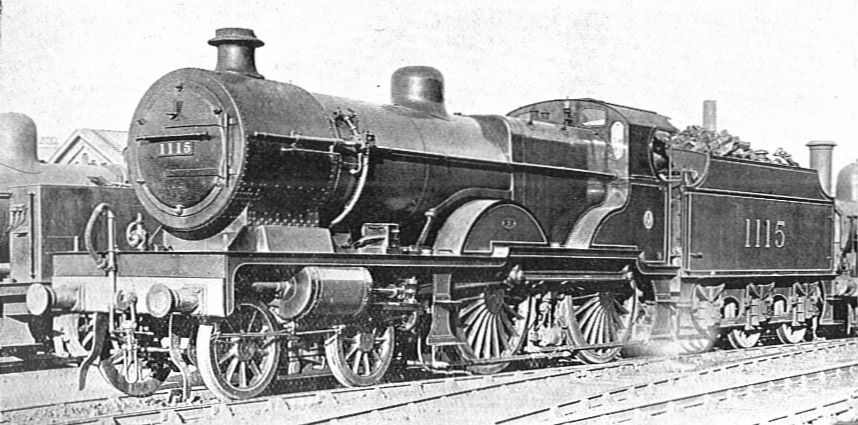
- LMS 1115 circa 1925–1928
Type and origin
- Power type: Steam
- Designer: Henry Fowler
- Builder: LMS Derby Works (75); LMS Horwich Works (20); North British Locomotive Company (25); Vulcan Foundry (75)
- Build date: 1924–1932
- Total produced: 195
Specifications
- Configuration
  - Whyte: 4-4-0
  - UIC: 2′B h3v
- Gauge: 4 ft 8 1/2 in (1,435 mm) standard gauge
- Leading dia.: 3 ft 6 1/2 in (1.080 m)
- Driver dia.: 6 ft 9 in (2.057 m)
- Wheelbase: Loco: 24 ft 3 in (7.391 m)
- Length: 56 ft 7 7/8 in (17.269 m)
- Loco weight: 61.70 long tons (62.69 t; 69.10 short tons)
- Tender weight: 41.2–41.7 long tons (41.9–42.4 t; 46.1–46.7 short tons)
- Fuel type: Coal
- Fuel capacity: 4.0–5.5 long tons (4.1–5.6 t; 4.5–6.2 short tons)
- Water cap.: 3,500 imp gal (15,900 L; 4,200 US gal)
- Firebox
  - Grate area: 28.5 sq ft (2.65 m^{2})
- Boiler: G9AS
- Boiler pressure: 200 lbf/in^{2} (1.38 MPa)
- Heating surface
  - Firebox: 147 sq ft (13.7 m^{2})
  - Tubes and flues: 1,170 sq ft (109 m^{2})
- Superheater
  - Heating area: 290 sq ft (26.9 m^{2}) or 272 sq ft (25.3 m^{2})
- Cylinders: One high pressure (inside); Two low pressure (outside)
- High-pressure cylinder: 19 in × 26 in (483 mm × 660 mm)
- Low-pressure cylinder: 21 in × 26 in (533 mm × 660 mm)
- Valve gear: Stephenson
- Valve type: HP: piston valves; LP: Slide valves
- Train brakes: Vacuum
Performance figures
- Tractive effort: 22,650 lbf (100.75 kN)
Career
- Operators: London, Midland and Scottish Railway; British Railways
- Power class: 4P
- Numbers: LMS 900–939, 1045–1199; BR: 40900-40939, 41045–41199
- Withdrawn: 1952–1961
- Disposition: All scrapped

The London, Midland and Scottish Railway Compound 4-4-0 was a class of steam locomotive designed for passenger work.

== Overview ==
One hundred and ninety five engines were built by the LMS, adding to the 45 Midland Railway 1000 Class, to which they were almost identical. The most obvious difference is that the driving wheel diameter was reduced from 7 ft 0 in (2.134 m) on the Midland locomotive to 6 ft 9 in (2.057 m) on the LMS version. They were given the power classification 4P.

The LMS continued the Midland numbering from 1045 to 1199 and then started in the lower block of 900–939. After nationalisation in 1948, BR added 40000 to their numbers so they became 40900–40939 and 41045–41199.

Table of orders
| LMS No. | BR No. | Lot No. | Date built | Built by | Nos. |
|---|---|---|---|---|---|
| 1045–1084 | 41045–41084 | 6 | 1924 | Derby Works | |
| 1085–1114 | 41085–41114 | 16 | 1925 | Derby Works | |
| 1115–1130 | 41115–41130 | 17 | 1925 | Horwich Works | |
| 1131–1134 | 41131–41134 | 17 | 1926 | Horwich Works | |
| 1135–1159 | 41135–41159 | 18 | 1925 | North British Loco | 23229–53 |
| 1160–1184 | 41160–41184 | 19 | 1925 | Vulcan Foundry | 3833–3857 |
| 1185–1199 | 41185–41199 | 38 | 1927 | Vulcan Foundry | 3998–4012 |
| 900–909 | 40900–40909 | 38 | 1927 | Vulcan Foundry | 4013–4022 |
| 910–924 | 40910–40924 | 38 | 1927 | Vulcan Foundry | 4033–4047 |
| 925–934 | 40925–40934 | 38 | 1927 | Vulcan Foundry | 4023–4032 |
| 935–939 | 40935–40939 | 90 | 1932 | Derby Works | |

40933 was later fitted with a Stanier 3500 gallon tender from 40936.

40936 was fitted to a Stanier 3500 gallon tender. Later fitted to 40933.

== Accidents and incidents ==
- On 8 January 1929, locomotive 1060 was hauling an express passenger train from Bristol to Leeds, Yorkshire when it overran signals at Ashchurch, Gloucestershire and collided with a freight train that was being shunted. Four people were killed.
- On 13 March 1935, locomotive No. 1165 was hauling a milk train that was in a rear-end collision with an express freight train, hauled LNWR Claughton Class 4-6-0 No. 5946, at King's Langley, Hertfordshire due to a signalman's error. Two other freight trains collided with the wreckage. One of these trains was hauled by LMS Patriot Class 4-6-0 No. 5511 and the other was a coal train, being hauled by LMS Class 7F 0-8-0 No. 9598. 1 person was killed.

== Withdrawal ==
The class were withdrawn between 1952 and 1961. None have survived into preservation, though the first of the Midland 1000 Class engines has. There is an unconfirmed report that No. 41168 was the subject of an unsuccessful preservation attempt by Dr. Peter Beet.

Table of withdrawals
| Year | Quantity in service at start of year | Quantity withdrawn | Locomotive numbers |
|---|---|---|---|
| 1952 | 195 | 6 | 40911/18/22, 41109/71/82. |
| 1953 | 189 | 13 | 40905, 41046/52/55–57/92/99, 41125/45/48/78/84. |
| 1954 | 176 | 23 | 40901/14/19/23, 41047/51/54/58/74/80/82/84/87/96, 41110/15/33–34/38–39/41/46/74. |
| 1955 | 153 | 37 | 40903/06/08/12–13/15–16/21/24, 41059/61/67/69–70/72/76/81/91, 41104/07/17/24/26/27/30/35–36/49/54/61/69/75–77/83/88/98. |
| 1956 | 116 | 27 | 40900/02/09–10/17/29/32/38–39, 41050/53/65/79/88/97, 41126/28/31–32/37/42/47/60/66/70/87/91. |
| 1957 | 89 | 34 | 40904/26–27/30/34, 41045/48/64/73/75/77/85/89/98, 41103/05/08/12/16/40/50–51/53/55/72/79–81/85–86/92/94–95/97. |
| 1958 | 55 | 36 | 40920/28/31/33/35/37, 41060/66/68/71/78/83/86/90/93/95, 41102/06/11/13–14/18–19/22/44/52/56/59/63–64/67/89–90/93/96/99. |
| 1959 | 19 | 13 | 40925, 41049/62/94, 41100–01/20–21/23/43/58/65/73. |
| 1960 | 6 | 4 | 40907, 41063, 41157/62. |
| 1961 | 2 | 2 | 40936, 41168. |

== Model railways ==
In 2013, Bachmann Branchline introduced a OO gauge model of locomotive 1189 in LMS black livery.
