= Locomotives of the Great Northern Railway (Great Britain) =

The following is a list of locomotives built for the Great Northern Railway. As is customary, engine classes are organized according to the man who was locomotive superintendent when the class was introduced, and to whom the design is often attributed. Six men held this post during the existence of the Great Northern Railway.

Until 1868 engines were obtained from outside manufacturers, but after this date were increasingly built at the railway's own Doncaster Works, commonly known as the "Plant".

Some engines acquired second-hand or from absorbed companies have been omitted from these lists.

The system of classes was introduced in 1900. Engines withdrawn prior to that date will not have them.

== Benjamin Cubitt (1846–1848) ==
Numbers	Wheel Arrangement	Quantity	Manufacturer	Date	Notes
1–50	2-2-2	50	Sharp Bros.	1847–50	"Small Sharps"; most rebuilt by Sturrock: 31 in 1852 as 2-2-2T (of which 11 later became 0-4-2T) and 14 as 0-4-2 from 1859 to 1867
51–70	2-2-2	20	R & W Hawthorn	1848–50	"Small Hawthorns"; two rebuilt by Stirling in 1870 as 0-4-2
101–115	0-4-2	15	R & W Hawthorn	1848–49	No. 111 rebuilt in 1863 as 0-6-0ST
121–132	0-4-0	12	Bury, Curtis & Kennedy	1848–49	Five rebuilt 1852–53 as 0-4-2ST
66 (later 100)	2-4-0	1	Bury, Curtis & Kennedy	1849	

== Edward Bury (1848–1850) ==
Numbers	Wheel Arrangement	Quantity	Manufacturer	Date	Notes
116–120, 134–158, 167	0-6-0	30	R .& W. Hawthorn (15); E. B. Wilson & Co. (15)	1850–51	Eight converted to Saddle tanks in 1864–66

Bury resigned after it was discovered he had placed orders for parts with his own firm, rather than another one which had offered a lower bid.

== Archibald Sturrock (1850–1866) ==
Numbers	Wheel Arrangement	Quantity	Manufacturer	Date	Ivatt Class	Notes
201–202	2-2-2	2	E. B. Wilson & Co.	1850	—	"Jenny Lind" type.
71–90	2-4-0	20	R & W Hawthorn (5); E. B. Wilson & Co. (15)	1851	—	
91–99, 200	4-2-0	10	R. B. Longridge & Co.	1851–52	—	Crampton-type. All converted 1853–54 to 2-2-2.
168–199, 300–307	0-6-0	40	E. B. Wilson & Co. (30); Wm. Fairbairn & Sons (10)	1851–53	J3	5-ft wheels; 14 with steam tenders fitted in 1864–66, removed in 1867–68
308–390	0-6-0	83	E. B. Wilson & Co. (23); Kitson & Co. (10); James Nasmyth & Co. (10); R. & W. Hawthorn (5); Sharp, Stewart & Co. (20); R. Stephenson & Co. (10); Vulcan Foundry (5)	1851–56	J1	5-ft 3-in wheels; 13 with steam tenders fitted in 1864–66, removed in 1867–68
203–214	2-2-2	12	R & W Hawthorn	1852–53	—	“Large Hawthorns”
215	4-2-2	1	R & W Hawthorn	1853	—	7-foot-6-inch (2.29 m) driving wheels reused on Stirlings' No. 92
223–228	2-4-0	6	R & W Hawthorn	1855	—	6-ft 6-in wheels
229–240	2-2-2	12	Kitson & Co. (4); Sharp Stewart (4); Stephenson (4)	1860	—	7-ft 0-in wheels
241–250, 270–279	0-4-2T	20	Avonside Engine Co. (15); Neilson & Co. (5)	1865–67	F5	
400–469	0-6-0	70	Avonside Engine Co. (5); Kitson & Co. (20); Neilson & Co. (20); R. & W. Hawthorn (19); Vulcan Foundry (6)	1865–66	J2/J3	20 with steam tenders, removed in 1867–68
251–260	2-4-0	10	Sharp Stewart	1866	E5	6-ft 0-in wheels
472–473	0-8-0T	2	Avonside Engine Co.	1866	—	
264–269	2-4-0	6	John Fowler & Co. (3); Yorkshire Engine Co. (3)	1866–67	B6	7-ft 0-in wheels. Rebuilt 1873–78 as 2-2-2

== Patrick Stirling (1866–1895) ==
Stirling built locomotives with domeless ("straightback") boilers. Many were rebuilt by Ivatt with larger, domed boilers, and were placed in a different class as shown in the table.

No. of 1st built	Wheel Arrangement	Quantity	Manufacturer	Date	Ivatt Class	Rebuilt as Class	LNER Class	Notes
280	2-4-0	22	Avonside Engine Co. (10); Yorkshire Engine Co. (10); Doncaster Works (2)	1867–71	E3	E4	—	
474	0-6-0	35	Neilson & Co. (10); John Fowler & Co. (10); Doncaster Works (15)	1867–73	J7	J8	—	
6	2-2-2	12	Doncaster Works	1868–70	B5	B7	—	7-foot-0-inch (2.13 m) driving wheels
18	0-4-2	117	Doncaster Works (67); Sharp, Stewart & Co. (30); Kitson & Co. (20)	1868–76	F2	F3	—	8 more supplied by Sharp, Stewart to the Lancashire and Yorkshire Railway (L&YR 605 class)
218	0-4-2	4	Doncaster Works	1868–69	F1	—	—	
126	0-4-2WT	13	Doncaster Works	1868–71	F4	F6	—	
392	0-6-0ST	7	Doncaster Works	1868–73	J11	J12	—	
396	0-6-0ST	7	Doncaster Works	1869–74	J19	—	—	
92	2-2-2	1	Doncaster Works	1870	B1	—	—	7-foot-6-inch (2.29 m) driving wheels from Sturrocks' No. 215
1	4-2-2	47	Doncaster Works	1870–93	A2	A3	—	
120	0-4-4BT	46	Doncaster Works	1872–81	G2	—	—	No.533 rebuilt as a crane-tank in 1905.
174	0-6-0	6	Doncaster Works	1872–74	original J4	—	—	Class extinct 1906, "J4" designation later reused for rebuilds of "J5"s
171	0-6-0	160	Doncaster Works (110); Vulcan Foundry (15); Dübs & Co. (35)	1873–96	J6	J4/J5	J3/J4	Boiler diameter: 4 ft 2½ in for J6, 4 ft 5 in for J5, 4 ft 8 in for J4
494	0-6-0ST	95	Doncaster Works (75); R. Stephenson & Co. (10); Neilson & Co. (10)	1874–92	J15	J16	J54/J55	
86	2-4-0	117	Doncaster Works (105); Kitson & Co. (12)	1874–79	E2	E1	—	
605	0-6-0ST	2	Doncaster Works	1875	J20	—	—	
606	0-6-0ST	10	Doncaster Works	1876–77	J17	J16	J56	
501	0-4-2ST	6	Doncaster Works	1876–78	F7	—		
629	0-4-4BT	2	Doncaster Works	1880	G5	—	—	
658	0-4-4T	16	Doncaster Works	1881–85	G3	G4	G2	
684	0-6-0ST	8	Doncaster Works	1882–92	J18	—	J57	
103	0-4-2	33	Doncaster Works	1882–95	F2	F3	—	
374	0-6-0	8	Doncaster Works	1883–88	J10	J9	J7	
238	2-2-2	2	Doncaster Works	1885	B2	—	—	
234	2-2-2	21	Doncaster Works	1886–94	B3	B4	—	
766	0-4-4T	29	Doncaster Works	1889–95	G1	—	G1	
921	0-6-0ST	52	Doncaster Works (32); Neilson & Co. (20)	1892–97	J14	—	J53	
1003	4-2-2	6	Doncaster Works	1894–95	A1	A3	—	Class extinct 1916, "A1" designation later reused for 4-6-2s
1081	0-6-0	10	Doncaster Works	1896	J5	J4	J3/J4	Boiler diameter: 4 ft 2½ in for J6, 4 ft 5 in for J5, 4 ft 8 in for J4
1021	0-6-0	10	Doncaster Works	1896	J9	—	—	

== Henry Ivatt (1895–1911) ==
Class	Wheel Arrangement	Quantity	Manufacturer	Date	LNER Class	Notes
D2	4-4-0	51	Doncaster Works	1896–99	D4	all rebuilt with larger boilers as D3 1912–28
E1	2-4-0	10	Doncaster Works	1897	E1	
J5	0-6-0	133	Doncaster Works (50); Dübs & Co. (48); Kitson & Co. (25)	1897–1901	J4	5 ft 2 in wheels
J13	0-6-0ST	85	Doncaster Works (50); R. Stephenson & Co. (10); Sharp, Stewart & Co. (25)	1897–1909	J52	
A4	4-2-2	1	Doncaster Works	1898	—	No.266
C1	4-4-2	22	Doncaster Works	1898–1903	C2	Small Boiler "Klondykes", some variations
C2	4-4-2T	60	Doncaster Works	1898–1907	C12	
D1	4-4-0	70	Doncaster Works	1898–1909	D2	
H1	2-6-0	20	Baldwin Locomotive Works	1899–1900	—	
A5	4-2-2	11	Doncaster Works	1900–01	—	
K1	0-8-0	55	Doncaster Works	1901–09	Q1/Q2	Q2 were rebuilds with piston valves.
C1	4-4-2	91	Doncaster Works	1902–10	C1	Large Boiler - Several experimental variations
L1	0-8-2T	41	Doncaster Works	1903–06	R1	
C1	4-4-2	3	Doncaster Works (2); Vulcan Foundry (1)	1905	C1	Four-cylinder compound
M	0-4-4T	6	Doncaster Works (2); Kitson & Co. (2); Avonside Engine Co. (2)	1905–1906	Not classified	Steam railcars
N1	0-6-2T	56	Doncaster Works	1907–12	N1	
J21	0-6-0	15	Doncaster Works	1908	J1	5 ft 8 in wheels
J22	0-6-0	20	Doncaster Works	1909–10	J5	5 ft 2 in wheels
D1	4-4-0	15	Doncaster Works	1911	D1	Superheated
J21	0-6-0	10	Doncaster Works	1912	J2	5 ft 8 in wheels - Superheated

== Nigel Gresley (1911–1922) ==
Class	Wheel Arrangement	Quantity	Manufacturer	Date	LNER Class	Notes
J22	0-6-0	110	Doncaster Works	1911–21	J6	5 ft 2 in wheels - Superheated
H2	2-6-0	10	Doncaster Works	1912–13	K1	All rebuilt as GNR Class H3 (LNER Class K2) 1920–37
J4	0-6-0	71		(1912–21)	J3	All rebuilds of J5, 82 more rebuilt by LNER
D3	4-4-0	46		(1912–23)	D3	All rebuilds of D2, remaining 5 rebuilt by LNER
O1	2-8-0	20	Doncaster Works (5); North British Locomotive Co. (15)	1913–19	O1	Later classified as O3 under the LNER.
J23	0-6-0T	30	Doncaster Works	1913–19	J51	All rebuilt by LNER to J50
H3	2-6-0	65	Doncaster Works (20); North British Locomotive Co. (20); Kitson & Co. (25)	1913–21	K2	Another 10 rebuilt from GNR Class H2 (LNER Class K1) 1920–37
K2	0-8-0	1	Doncaster Works	(1914)	Q3	Rebuild of K1 with same boiler as H3
O2	2-8-0	1	Doncaster Works	1918	O2	Three-cylinder, first use of conjugated valve-gear
H4	2-6-0	10	Doncaster Works	1920–25	K3	Another 183 built by LNER
O2	2-8-0	10	North British Locomotive Co.	1921	O2	Three-cylinder. Another 56 built by LNER
N2	0-6-2T	60	Doncaster Works (10); North British Locomotive Co. (50)	1920–21	N2	Another 47 built by LNER
J23	0-6-0T	10	Doncaster Works	1922	J50	Another 62 built by LNER + 30 rebuilds from J51
A1	4-6-2	2	Doncaster Works	1922	A1	Three-cylinder. Another 50 built by LNER, including Flying Scotsman. No. 1470, Great Northern, was rebuilt as the solitary Thompson A1/1, the rest as LNER Class A3.

== Preserved locomotives ==
GNR No.	GN class	Wheel Arrangement	Manufacturer	Serial No.	Date	Notes
1	A2	4-2-2	Doncaster Works	50	April 1870	Static exhibit, National Collection, York
990	C1	4-4-2	Doncaster Works	769	May 1898	Named Henry Oakley; static exhibit, National Collection, York
1247	J13	0-6-0ST	Sharp, Stewart & Co.	4492	May 1899	BR No. 68846; National Collection, York
251	C1	4-4-2	Doncaster Works	991	December 1902	Static exhibit, National Collection, Doncaster Museum and Art Gallery
1744	N2	0-6-2T	North British Locomotive Co.	22500	February 1921	BR No. 69523; Serviceable.
1472	A1	4-6-2	Doncaster railway works	1564	1923	BR No. 60103 Flying Scotsman; Undergoing refit. Construction started by the GNR, but delivered to the LNER.

== Sources ==
- Bird, George Frederick (1910). The Locomotives of the Great Northern Railway. London: Locomotive Publishing Co.
- Groves, Norman (1986). Great Northern Locomotive History, Volume 1: 1847–66. Railway Correspondence and Travel Society. ISBN 0-901115-61-4.
- Groves, Norman (1991) [1987]. Great Northern Locomotive History, Volume 2: 1867–95 The Stirling Era. Railway Correspondence and Travel Society. ISBN 0-901115-74-6.
- Groves, Norman (1990). Great Northern Locomotive History, Volume 3a: 1896–1911 The Ivatt Era. Railway Correspondence and Travel Society. ISBN 0-901115-69-X.
- Groves, Norman (1992). Great Northern Locomotive History, Volume 3b: 1911–1922 The Gresley Era. Railway Correspondence and Travel Society. ISBN 0-901115-70-3.
