= GNR Ivatt 1 Class 0-6-0 =

Class of British steam locomotives

GNR Class 1 0-6-0 GNR class J21 LNER class J1
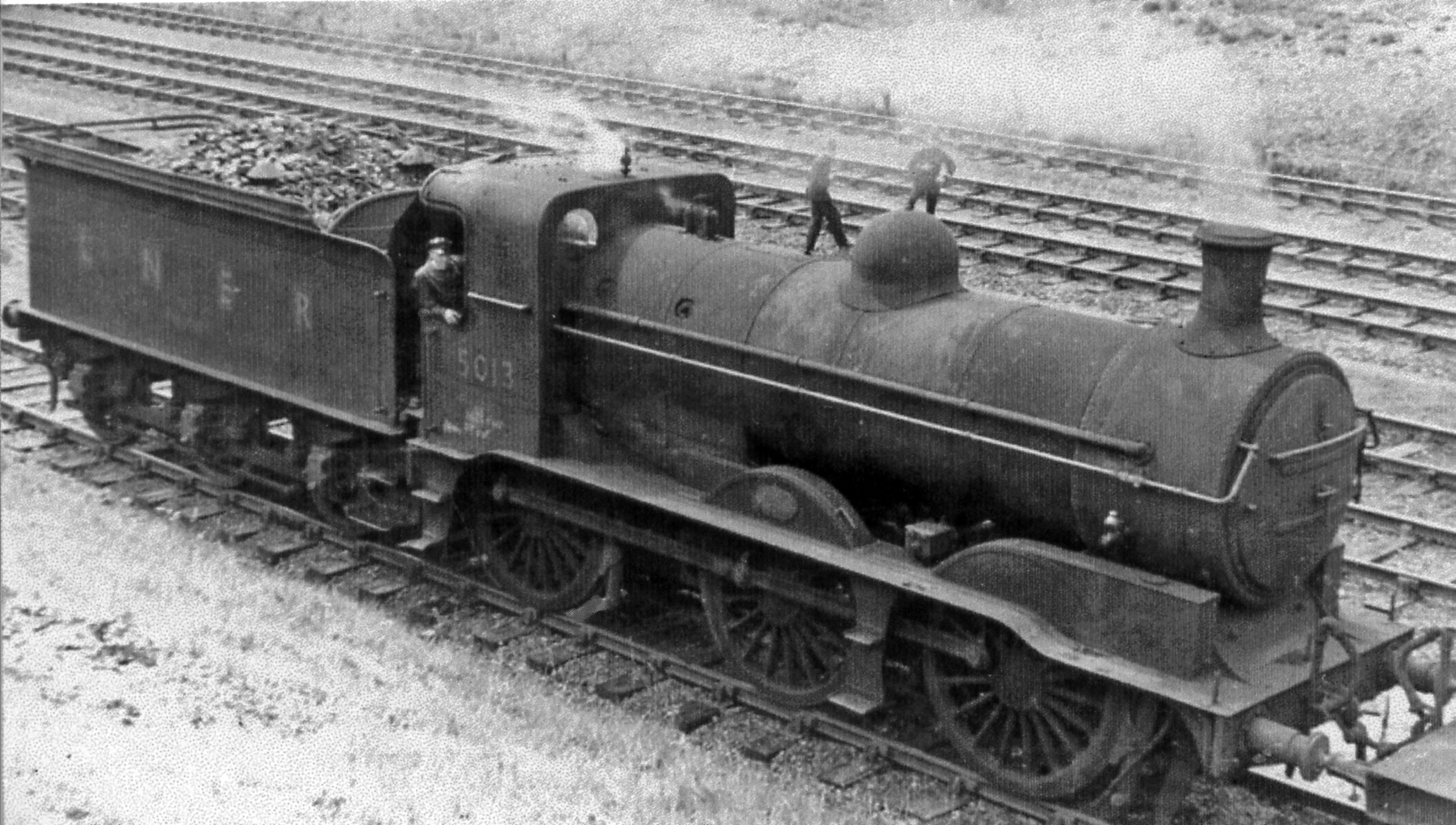
- LNER class J1 (ex GNR class J21) No. 5013 at New Southgate, July 1948
Type and origin
- Power type: Steam
- Designer: Henry A. Ivatt
- Builder: Doncaster Works
- Serial number: 1198, 1202–1215
- Build date: August – November 1908
- Total produced: 15
Specifications
- Configuration
  - Whyte: 0-6-0
  - UIC: C n2
- Gauge: 4 ft 8 1/2 in (1,435 mm)
- Driver dia.: 5 ft 8 in (1.727 m)
- Wheelbase: 37 ft 8 in (11.5 m)
  - Engine: 16 ft 3 in (4.95 m)
  - Tender: 13 ft (4.0 m)
- Length: 50 ft 5 1/2 in (15.4 m) over buffers
- Axle load: 17.2 long tons (17.5 t)
- Loco weight: 46.7 long tons (47.4 t)
- Tender weight: 43.1 long tons (43.8 t)
- Total weight: 89.8 long tons (91.2 t)
- Fuel type: Coal
- Fuel capacity: 6 long tons 10 cwt (14,600 lb or 6.6 t)
- Water cap.: 3,500 imp gal (16,000 L; 4,200 US gal)
- Firebox
  - Type: Round-top
  - Grate area: 19 sq ft (1.77 m^{2})
- Boiler
  - Model: LNER Diagram 7
  - Diameter: 4 ft 8 in (1.4 m)
  - Tube plates: 10 ft 1 in (3,070 mm)
- Boiler pressure: 175 psi (1.21 MPa)
- Heating surface
  - Firebox: 120 sq ft (11 m^{2})
  - Tubes: 1,130 sq ft (105 m^{2})
  - Total surface: 1,250 sq ft (116 m^{2})
- Cylinders: Two, outside
- Cylinder size: 18 in × 26 in (457 mm × 660 mm)
- Valve gear: Stephenson
- Valve type: Slide
Performance figures
- Tractive effort: 18,428 lbf (82.0 kN) @ 85% boiler pressure
- Factor of adh.: 6.27
Career
- Operators: Great Northern Railway; → London & North Eastern Railway; → British Railways
- Power class: BR: 2MT
- Numbers: GNR: 1 – 15; LNER: 3001–3015 → 5000–5014; BR: 65002–65010, 65013-65014
- Axle load class: Route Availability 4
- Withdrawn: 1947 (4), 1951–1954 (11)
- Disposition: All scrapped

The GNR Ivatt Class 1 0-6-0 (LNER Class J1) was a class of fifteen inside-cylinder 0-6-0s designed for express goods work. They were Henry Ivatt's first original class of 0-6-0. Ivatt had previously designed a modified version of Patrick Stirling's J5 Class of 1873.

== History ==
At the beginning of the 20th century, the GNR started to introduce fast goods trains to the railway. However, the J5 Class was of little use on these services, as they lacked speed and were between twenty and thirty years old by then. Furthermore, outdated express passenger locomotives, such as the Stirling Singles, and secondary passenger locomotives, such as the D2 Class of 1896, were also being used on these services, but these were not designed with such traffic in mind.

Henry Ivatt considered his N1 Class 0-6-2 tank locomotives of 1905, and believing in standardization decided to use the boiler, wheels, motion, and cylinders from the N1s for a good balance between speed and power. The first member, No. 1, was outshopped in August 1908. The next five members, Nos. 2–6, were built in September, Nos. 7–11 in October, and the last four, Nos. 12–15, in November the same year. Like the N1s, all of the Class 1 0-6-0s were built at Doncaster.

Initial allocations included six at Peterborough New England, with three each at Ardsley, King's Cross, and Colwick. Despite being used mainly on goods trains, the class was also regularly assigned to haul passenger trains. All three of the King's Cross allocations were known to have hauled excursions to Skegness in 1909. The arrival of the H2 Class in 1912 led to the class being reassigned to lighter duties. However, they were consistently used on goods and passenger trains until the end of their working lives.

== LNER services ==
The class survived intact into LNER days, being reclassed J1. Allocations included seven at King's Cross, four at Bradford, two at Colwick, and one at Peterborough New England. Those based in Bradford were used in the West Riding hauling both goods and passenger trains. However, they could also be found on summer excursions to Scarborough and Bridlington. Until World War II, their allocations were more or less consistent.

During World War II, the class had eight members allocated to Gorton and seven allocated to Colwick. Their regular duties at this time were pick-up goods trains and local passenger trains. In 1945, all fifteen members were allocated to Colwick. However, this was temporary. In 1946, the class was renumbered from 3001–3015 to 5000–5014. During this time, the class had nine members based at Colwick, four at Peterborough New England, and two at Leicester Central.

== Modifications ==
The modifications made by the LNER were relatively standard to most GNR locomotives. These included shorter domes, shorter chimneys, the whistles mounted on the firebox, and Ross pop safety valves in the place of Ramsbottom safety valves. Eventually, all fifteen members received chimneys similar to those on the J6 Class "Knick-Knacks".

== Decline and British Railways service ==
Eleven members of the class survived into British Railways (BR) service. Only one, No. 5006, never received its BR number. The first four members to be withdrawn were Nos. 5000, 5001, 5011, and 5012 from Colwick in August 1947. By August 1948, the Leicester allocations all moved to Colwick. However, No. 65009 was reallocated to Leicester between December 1948 and July 1950. In June 1948, three of the Colwick allocations moved to Hitchin. These were Nos. 65003, 65010, and 65013.

The first BR withdrawal was No. 5006 from Peterborough New England in July 1951. Due to the class's age, withdrawals progressed steadily. By 1952, the remaining ten members were allocated to Colwick (6), Hitchin (3), and Peterborough New England (1). The sixth withdrawal, No. 65007, was also the first of the Colwick allocations to go. The last of the Peterborough allocations to go, No. 65005 was withdrawn that May as the ninth member of its class to go.

By 1953, only five of the class were left. These were the three Hitchin allocations and two Colwick allocations, those being Nos. 65002 and 65014. The first of the Hitchin allocations to go was No. 65003 on 12 January followed by No. 65010 a week later, leaving No. 5013 as the last of the Hitchin allocations. By 1954, only No. 65002 and 65013 were left. No. 65002 was withdrawn in August, and the very last withdrawn was No. 65013, which is best remembered for rescuing express passenger trains on at least two occasions and taking over for a failed Pacific with a train as long as fourteen coaches. All members of this class were scrapped.
