= Race to the North =

Rivalry between British railway companies

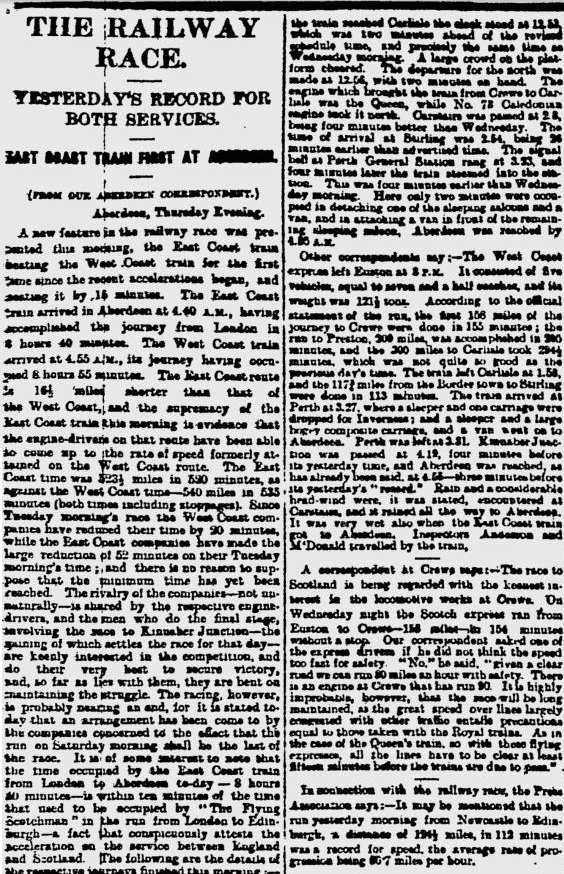
Main news item in the Glasgow Herald, 23 August 1895. The image shows the top section of the full report.

The Race to the North was the name given by the press to occasions in two summers of the late 19th century when British passenger trains belonging to different companies would literally race each other from London to Edinburgh over the two principal rail trunk routes connecting the English capital city to Scotland – the West Coast Main Line which runs from London Euston via Crewe and Carlisle and the East Coast Main Line route from London King's Cross via York and Newcastle. The "races" were never official and publicly the companies denied that what happened was racing at all. Results were not announced officially and the outcomes have since been hotly debated. In the 20th century there were also occasions of competition for speed on the two routes.

== Background ==
East and west coast railway routes at the time of the "Races"

The late nineteenth century was a boom time for the railways in Britain with many independent companies operating but with poor coordination between the companies' lines. Gradually merger and other formal agreements were made so that travel across the country became feasible. For the first time long-distance rail travel could be afforded by the general public. By the 1880s two consortia in particular provided services between London and Edinburgh using separate routes on the east and west coasts of Britain terminating in London at King's Cross and Euston stations, and in Edinburgh at Waverley and Princes Street stations. Great Northern Railway (GNR) and North Eastern Railway (NER) ran the East Coast service with London and North Western Railway (LNWR) and Caledonian Railway (CR) on the West Coast. The companies each had territories where they owned the track or had legally enforcible running rights on some other tracks. At the "borders" between these companies' territories – York and Carlisle – locomotives were always changed (and they were generally changed at intermediate points also) but passengers did not necessarily have to change carriage.

In 1888, driven by commercial rivalry, the East Coast and West Coast consortia started competing fiercely over the speed of their express services over these two routes.

By the 1890s, an east coast route had been established further north through Scotland over the Forth and Tay bridges allowing the North British Railway (NBR) to provide a reasonably direct Edinburgh to Aberdeen service so as to extend the East Coast consortium's King's Cross to Scotland route. Although NBR owned the track from further south at Berwick-on-Tweed, NER had running rights to Edinburgh. Caledonian already had a route connecting Carlisle and Aberdeen via Stirling and Perth. In 1895 a second "race" broke out but this time with the added excitement of arriving at the same station in Aberdeen. Indeed, after some 500 miles from London, the two routes converged to being in sight of each other just before Kinnaber Junction from where a common route was shared to Aberdeen.

In 1901, the Midland Railway and North British Railway ran an accelerated London St Pancras to Edinburgh Waverley express. East Coast responded by speeding up and West Coast briefly joined in. Although the press hoped for a new "Race", nothing came of it.

== London to Edinburgh, 1888 ==
From 1885 the main London to Edinburgh services were as follows.

Route	East Coast	East Coast	M & N.B. (Note: Midland Railway and North British Railway.)	West Coast
1885 timetable
Passenger class	1st & 2nd	1st, 2nd & 3rd	1st & 3rd	1st, 2nd & 3rd
London depart	10:00	10:10	10:35	10:00
Edinburgh arrive	19:00 43.7 mph	20:10	20:42	20:00 40.0 mph
August 1888 record time	1st, 2nd & 3rd			
Edinburgh arrive	17:27 52.8 mph			17:38 52.4 mph
Subsequent scheduled time
Edinburgh arrive	18:15 47.7 mph			18:30 47.0 mph

In 1885, the east coast express service comprised GNR from King's Cross stopping at Grantham and York and then NER stopping at Newcastle, Berwick and Edinburgh Waverley – a distance of 393.2 miles (632.8 km). On the west coast, LNWR from Euston stopped at Willesden, Rugby, Crewe, Preston and Carlisle followed by Caledonian stopping at two stations in Scotland before Edinburgh Princes Street – 399.7 miles (643.3 km). Even the fastest run (Grantham to York) was slower than 50 mph (80 km/h).

The East Coast had a very strong hold on the traffic and this was consolidated further in November 1887, when the railways announced that the Special Scotch Express (Note: The Special Scotch Express was called the Flying Scotsman even at the time although the train was not officially given this name until 1924.) would also take 3rd class passengers. West Coast, faced with dwindling traffic, took a decisive step. Delaying their announcement to the last minute, they stated in June 1888 that the Day Scotch Express would now arrive in Edinburgh an hour earlier, at 19:00. On 1 July the East Coast arrival time became 18:30, with the lunch stop at York being reduced from 30 to 20 minutes – on 1 August West Coast matched this time, cutting out stops between Carlisle and Edinburgh, but East Coast, seemingly in anticipation, started arriving at 18:00 on the same day. West Coast were determined to match this time and decided to run two separate trains with fewer carriages – the racing train travelled non-stop from Euston to Crewe. (Note: At the time the longest run in Britain ever attempted. Made possible by water troughs which were only on the West Coast line.)

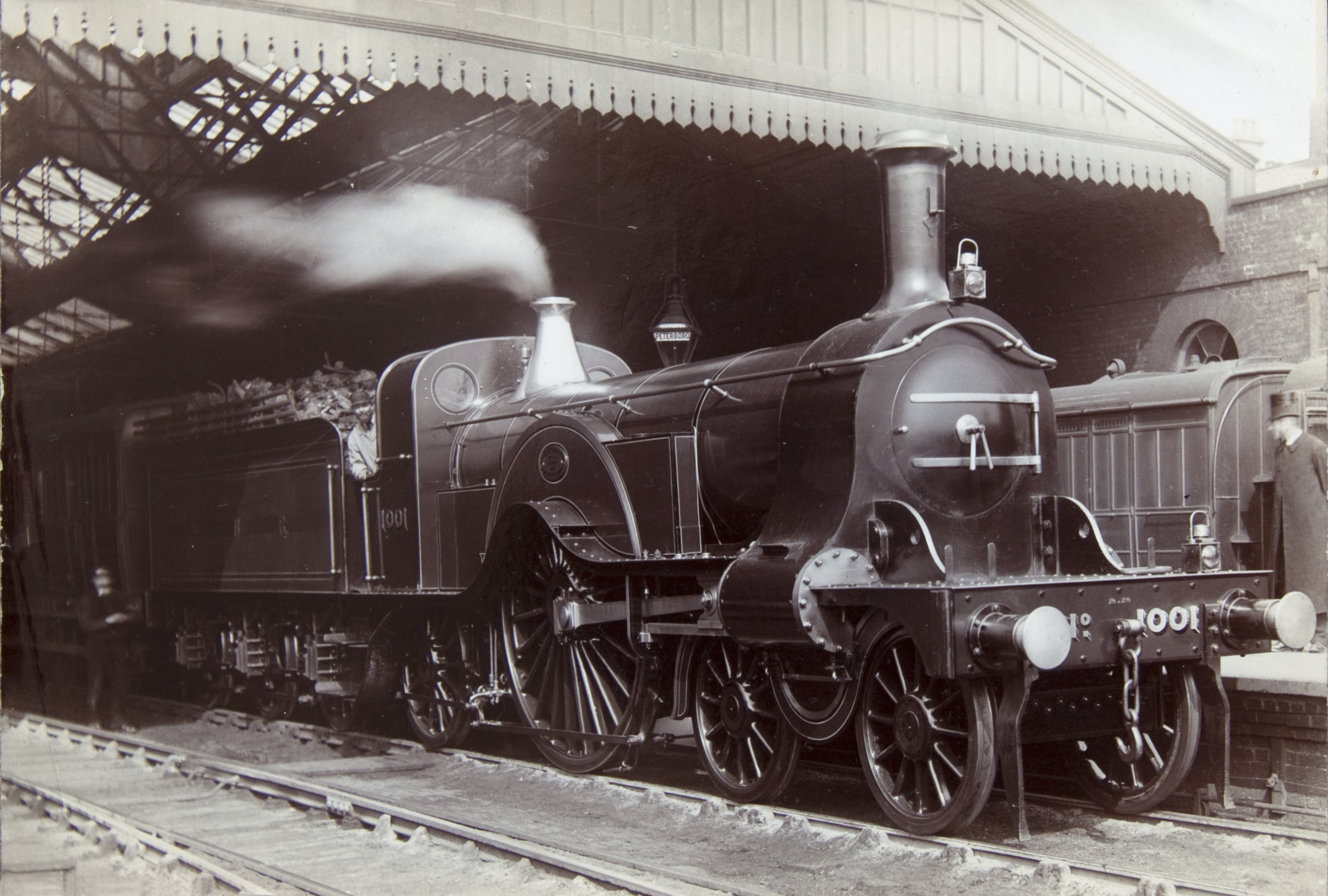
GNR Stirling 4-2-2 Eight-foot Single

This schedule started on 6 August, Bank Holiday, with the press now taking full notice, crowds turning out at Euston and bookmakers taking bets on the results. To the surprise of the experts on that first day the LNWR locomotive to Crewe was the 25-year-old Problem class Waverley 2-2-2 single. (Note: Also colloquially called "Lady of the Lake" after the most famous engine in the class. A "single" is a steam engine with a single (and therefore large) pair of driving wheels.) Another surprise was that Caledonian ran its brand new and unique No. 123 4-2-2 single and this locomotive was used every day of the series. In fact, both trains used to arrive in Edinburgh earlier than scheduled and reporters would guess which train would arrive first and then would race the mile length of Princes Street in hansom cabs in the hope of seeing the other train arrive. The results were cabled to the New York Herald for reporting the next day. By 13 August East Coast booked an arrival time of 17:45, omitting the stop at Berwick and averaging 59.3 mph (95.4 km/h) between Newcastle and Edinburgh. On the same day West Coast abandoned any timetable at intermediate stations and the train left as soon as it was able. In this way they beat the East Coast "record" even before it had been made. Worse, East Coast arrived later than scheduled although they made amends on 31 August, arriving at 17:27. On both lines the overall speed had been over 52 mph (84 km/h). However, on 14 August the companies held a conference in London and it was agreed that minimum journey times of 7¾ hours (East Coast) and 8 hours (West Coast) would be adhered to during the rest of that month and then times would be increased by 30 minutes.

Throughout the period, the Midland Railway, who had recently completed the Settle and Carlisle Line, and the North British Railway (NBR) on the Waverley Line were faced with a longer route – from London St Pancras via Manchester and Carlisle to Edinburgh Waverley – with many curves and gradients and so they were unable to be competitive on speed.

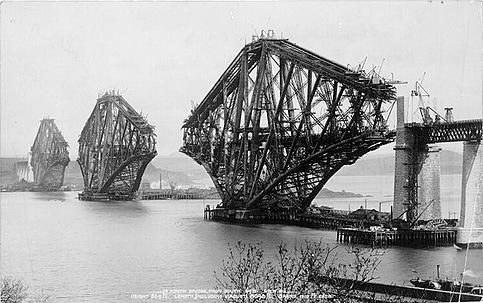
Forth Bridge, under construction

Thus the racing came to an end after August and the end of the holidays, although there were now 29 express trains a day between London and Scotland (in both directions) compared to 16 in 1885. A new prospect was appearing however, and the Pall Mall Gazette wrote: "The main cause confronts us when we see those three stupendous towers of steel which loom above the horizon of Edinburgh. When the Forth Bridge is finished the North Western and Caledonian will have to struggle hard if they wish to retain much of the traffic to Dundee or Aberdeen".

=== The companies' locomotives and trains in the 1880s ===
Innovations in steam locomotive design included the introduction of compound locomotives and bogies rather than axle leading wheels. The railway companies had their own individual locomotive works and locomotive designers.

On the East Coast route, GNR locomotives ran on what was then the fastest line in the world, but the "Flying Scotsman" service was not their fastest train – it was 49 mph (79 km/h) compared to 54 mph (87 km/h) on routes with more competition. A wide variety of locomotives were in use – the Patrick Stirling 4-2-2 "8-foot" singles, complemented with his 2-2-2 "7-foot 6" singles, were outstanding for speed and reliability, being capable of 75 mph (121 km/h) on flat terrain. The latest express NER engines were Tennant 2-4-0s (Note: Henry Tennant was the NER general manager) and the T. W. Worsdell–von Borries compound Worsdell 'F' 4-4-0s which were powerful, although not so fast. (Note: Marsden provides some detail on these two locomotives.) Having compound engines required the development of stronger steel coupling rods for fast running, and the 4-4-0s developed from 2-4-0s when it was found that a front bogie gave greater high speed stability. The East Coast route had no severe gradients and was slightly shorter than the west.

Up to the 1880s, the LNWR's rail services were relatively slow and local, and their express locomotives had been designed for economy rather than speed. As somewhat of an exception, John Ramsbottom's "Lady of the Lake" 2-2-2 single (Note: Designed in 1859.) hauled the Irish Mail for which the contract stipulated a minimum average speed of 42 mph (68 km/h) and even this could be a problem – the load on the train was important and third class passengers were excluded to keep the load down and the speed up. The Precedent Class 2-4-0s were exceptional for the time, and would eventually turn out to have a good turn of speed. Francis Webb compound steam engines were starting to be introduced but were not yet notably powerful or economic. Regarding the principal express Caledonian locomotives, Dugald Drummond 4-4-0s were good for ascending hills but were untested for speed. Their earlier locomotives needed to be run double-headed on larger trains. A new locomotive, the Single No. 123 4-2-2, was introduced but still untested. (Note: The newly introduced No. 123 was the only locomotive used throughout.) For the West Coast line, the climbs to top of Shap and Beattock were the steepest gradients.

For the 1888 accelerations, the West Coast companies willingly double-headed their express trains and so had power in hand. On the GNR, the Stirling Single engines did not allow double-heading and the new third class passengers were creating a greater load. The Caledonian Railway now ran two separate trains north from Carlisle, to Glasgow and Edinburgh, though these were single-headed. However, the journey time improvements came from cutting waiting times and delays as much as by raising running speed. The NER was an exception by being able to raise their average speed from about 49 to 58 mph (79 to 93 km/h), and it was later by double-heading their trains that East Coast gained a decisive advantage. Trains ran lightly loaded, typically with only four or five carriages.

== London to Aberdeen, 1895 ==
The railways arrived in Aberdeen in 1850 and an east coast through service was instituted in 1855, taking 17½ hours from London, reduced by 1889 to nearly 13 hours. With the opening of the Forth Bridge in 1890, the distances from London to Aberdeen were 523.2 miles (842.0 km) and 539.7 miles (868.6 km) on east and west coast routes. The timetables for the main expresses were as follows.

East Coast	Daytime	Overnight	West Coast	Daytime	Overnight
1890 timetable
King's Cross depart	10:00	20:00	Euston depart	10:00	20:00
Edinburgh depart	18:55	05:30			
Dundee depart	20:30	07:00			
Aberdeen arrive	22:20 42.4 mph	08:55 40.5 mph	Aberdeen arrive	22:55 41.8 mph	08:50 42.0 mph
August 1895 record time
Aberdeen arrive		04:40 60.4 mph	Aberdeen arrive		04:32 63.2 mph
Subsequent scheduledtime
Aberdeen arrive		06:20 50.6 mph	Aberdeen arrive		07:00 49.1 mph

At the beginning of 1893, the West Coast accelerated the Day Scotch Express to arrive at 22:25 and devised a scheme for delaying its rivals at Kinnaber Junction, where Caledonian operated the signal box. The booked time at Dubton, the Caledonian line signalbox before Kinnaber, was six minutes before the time booked for Kinnaber although the journey only took two minutes. The Dubton signalman would offer the train to Kinnaber at its booked Dubton time at the latest – which might be earlier than its actual time. The Kinnaber signalman would accept the train thus keeping the signals against North British. The North British train was only given clearance if it actually passed the North British Montrose signal box before the Dubton booking time. By this means until the NBR realised what was happening and complained, the Caledonian could take priority even with its rival already waiting at Kinnaber.

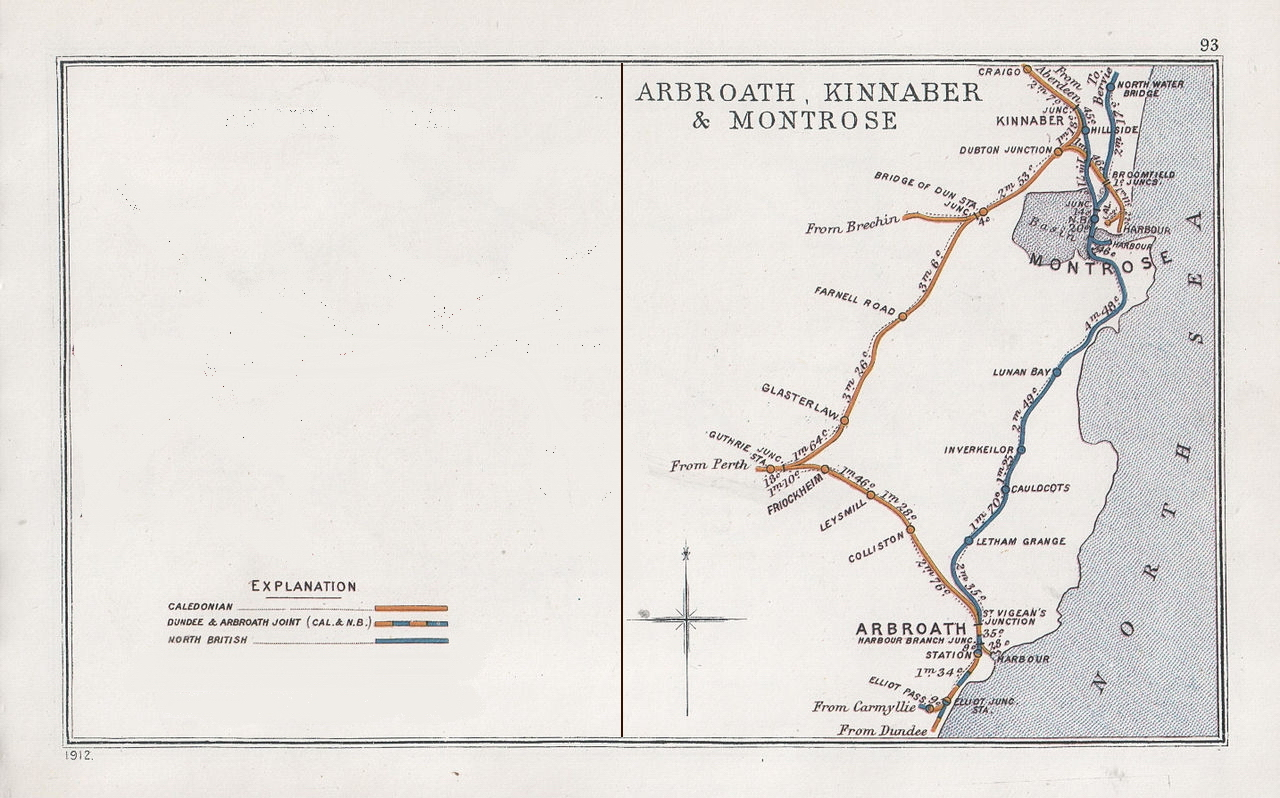
1912 Railway Clearing House Junction Diagram showing railways converging at Kinnaber Junction

In the event, competition focussed on the overnight expresses. East Coast soon changed its timetable to arrive at Aberdeen at 08:15 and West Coast followed suit with 08:05. However, whereas West Coast ran a reliable service, North British were often late because of slow changes of engine at Waverley station, (Note: Until it was completely redeveloped in 1892 things at Waverley station had been worse; even express trains could be delayed by three hours.) and a tortuous and undulating run from there northwards on a line that was partially single track. (Note: Involving five tablet exchanges. See North British, Arbroath and Montrose Railway.) By June 1893, East Coast had a booked arrival time of 07:35 and West Coast 07:50. However, if the North British train was slightly late it would be beaten to Kinnaber Junction and not be able to pass the Caledonian train. Caledonian owned the line from Kinnaber to Aberdeen but NBR held running rights (Caledonian required running rights over a very short section of NBR line at Monklands, Lanarkshire).

By 1 July 1895, these times had been brought forward to 07:20 (East) and 07:40 (West). This involved NER reaching Edinburgh in 8 hours 13 minutes, in breach of the 1888 agreement not to take less than 8½ hours. (Note: Because the Caledonian route to Aberdeen did not pass via Edinburgh, they were unaffected by the agreement.) In practice West Coast, stopping at seven intermediate stations on its route and pulling trains of 15 to 17 carriages, was frequently arriving later than 08:00. Without prior warning, on 15 July, West Coast widely advertised a new arrival time of 07:00, reducing the intermediate stops to five, and next morning the train actually arrived at 06:47 and on the next run 06:21 was achieved. Inevitably, the East Coast announced a new arrival time of 06:45, which although earlier than the West Coast booked time, was nevertheless beaten by the actual West Coast arrivals. There were urgent communications within the East Coast consortium about whether to try and negotiate their way out of the developing race until on 25 July the Marquis of Tweedale, NBR chairman, wired John Conacher, NBR general manager "My opinion is our best policy is to beat them at any cost...". The NBR train arrived at 06:23, two minutes ahead of the new booked time, only to find the rival train had arrived 06:06.

From the beginning of August, the newspapers were reporting on what they called the "Race to the North" and Kinnaber Junction, until that time an unknown outpost, was analysed in detail. Crowds gathered at the various stations. Even in the early hours of the morning men, women and children gathered at Carlisle Citadel station to join the excitement. For the newspapers sensation required not just speed but also potential disaster and the dangers were debated. At Cupar in Fife the permanent-way gang was called out each night to correct the rails after the express had passed round the curve at speed – the displacement was about three inches.

=== 19/20 August 1895 ===
Unusually, on 18 August East Coast arrived at Aberdeen first. This was achieved by reducing the number of carriages to seven at most, by not allowing passengers to get on or off the train at intermediate stations south of Dundee, (Note: So that the train did not have to wait for the booked departure time.) and by making greater time allowances for keeping the line clear of other traffic. The companies' internal telegrams make no bones about calling it a "race". The next night, sworn to secrecy, three elite railway journalists were invited to travel. After measuring a speed of 81.5 mph (131.2 km/h) approaching the S curves at Portobello (where the speed limit was 15 mph) they were flung to the floor and the train was still going 64 mph (103 km/h) entering Waverley station. The engines were changed in two minutes but a station official kept the train waiting another 8½ minutes. Time was more than made up by Dundee and there was no problem at Kinnaber so the train arrived at Aberdeen at 05:30. The Caledonian train had got in 16 minutes earlier – with only four carriages.

=== 20–23 August 1895 ===
On the night of 20/21 August, both trains made exceptionally good time. NBR had decided to split their train at Waverley with the slower part not due to reach Aberdeen until 06:25. A "considerable number of people" at Dundee station were there to cheer, even at 03:42. Approaching Kinnaber Junction just before dawn at four in the morning, the trains could be seen from each other across the Montrose Basin. North British passed Montrose signal box at 04:22 but Caledonian had reached Dubton at 04:21 and so, receiving a clear line, made its Aberdeen arrival at 04:58 with an average speed from start to finish of over 60 mph (97 km/h).

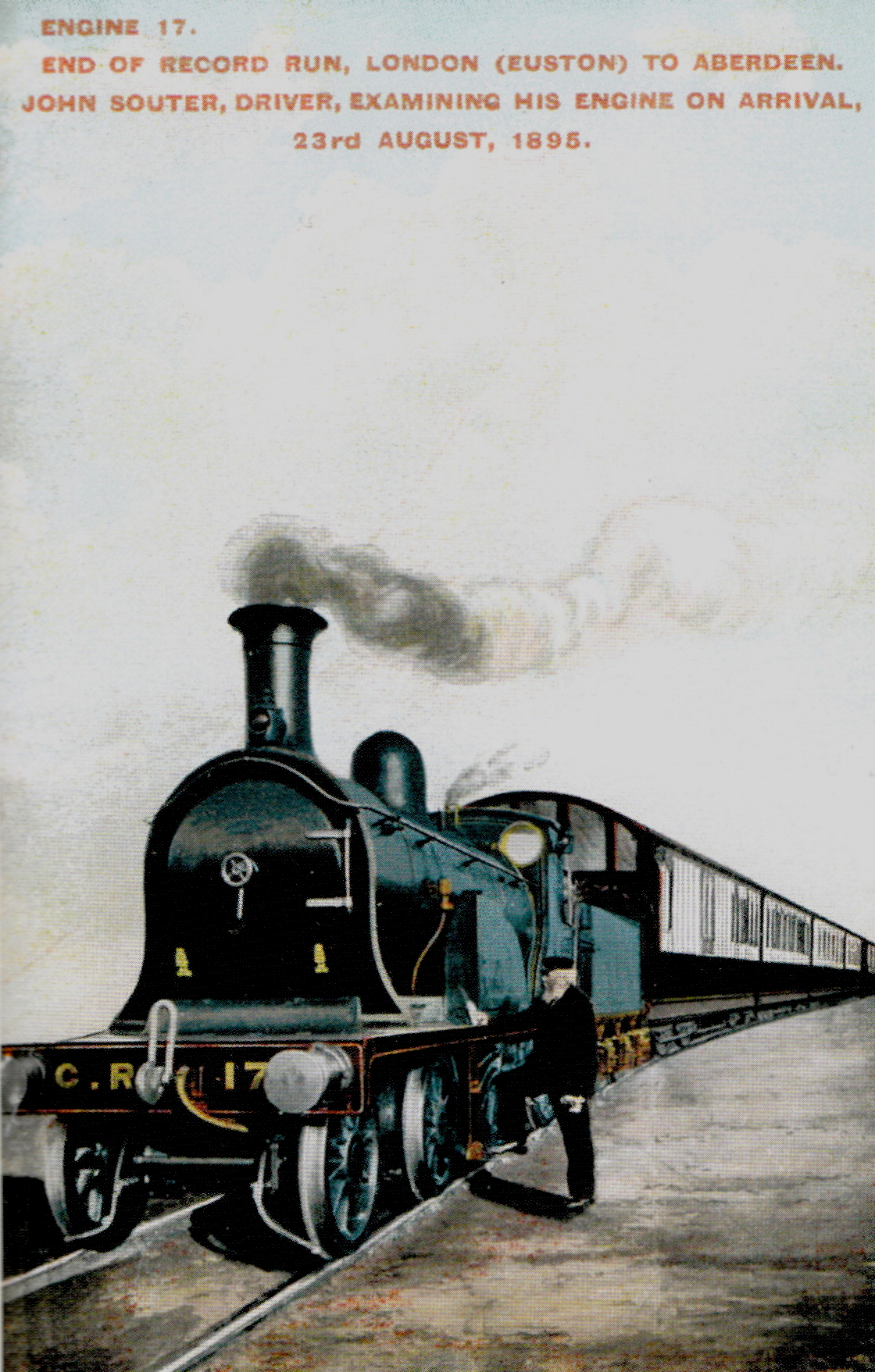
Caledonian Railway postcard showing engine driver John Souter and the Lambie No. 17 4-4-0, 23 August 1895.

By this time, the leading newspapers had reporters at all the stations to telegraph in their accounts of the night. Crowds thronged the platforms. On 21/22 August, NER put in a particularly strong performance averaging 66.2 mph (106.5 km/h) between Newcastle and Edinburgh, a distance of 124.4 miles (200.2 km). NBR were quickly out of Waverley and beat Caledonian to Kinnaber by 15 minutes, arriving in Aberdeen at 04:40. A "leading official" of LNWR stated "We don't admit that we're racing at all. We only claim that it's possible for us to arrive in Aberdeen at the same time as the trains of the East Coast Railway...". Both trains had averaged over 60 mph London to Aberdeen. NBR general manager John Conacher telegraphed his GNR counterpart Sir Henry Oakley "After this morning's achievement I think we ought to revert to advertised time ... There is a feeling here that rivalry has gone far enough already...". That afternoon the press were told that East Coast would in future arrive at 06:20 – the competitive racing was over.

That evening (22 August) at Euston station there was the usual excitement. West Coast wanted to regain the advantage and next morning the Yorkshire Post were able to report "A Sensational Achievement by the West Coast Express". Pulling only three carriages and leaving out the stop at Stirling, Aberdeen was reached at 04:32. A Caledonian Railway publicity postcard of the time shows the figure of their engine driver John Souter standing alone by his locomotive at Aberdeen station. This picture is belied by the report in the Daily Sketch – "Driver Souter, who has all along been in charge of this engine, is the railway hero of the moment ... There was much excitement at Aberdeen on the great day, the train being waited for by a crowd of spectators. Souter and his stoker were borne shoulder-high...".

In his 1958 book about the series of races, Oswald Nock wrote of the 22/23 August journey, "And at that astonishing average speed of 63.3 mph made sixty-three years ago the London–Aberdeen record still stands today". (Note: This time was not broken until the InterCity 125 trains in the late 1970s. In 2013 the London to Aberdeen overnight sleeper takes the West Coast route with a journey time of 10 hours 19 minutes, 52.3 mph (84.2 km/h) and is deliberately scheduled to arrive at a reasonable time. Direct daytime trains take just over 7 hours, 73.7 mph (118.6 km/h) travelling on the East Coast route. The two routes now meet at Dundee.)

=== The companies' locomotives and trains in the 1890s ===
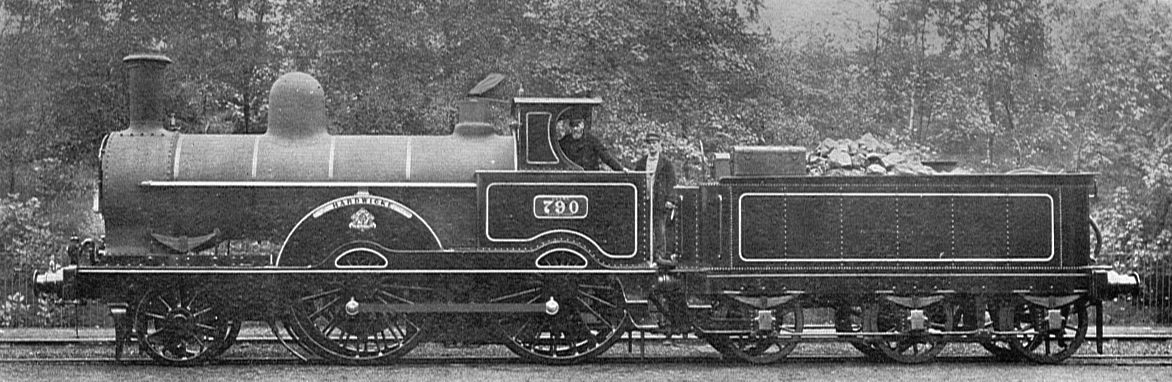
LNWR Improved Precedent ("Jumbo") class No. 790 Hardwicke – a participating locomotive.

Between 1888 and 1895, better-built bogie carriages were becoming available. LNWR had started introducing improved 60 ft (18 m) rails and were still the only company with water troughs. There had also been some important development in express locomotive design.

The GNR had the same locomotives as before, but the NER had made considerable changes. Improved piston valves were introduced generally. The large and heavy Worsdell M 4-4-0 was introduced, designed specifically towards speed – apart from the early models, these had compound cylinders. (Note: See Marsden) These achieved the highest average speeds of all, including 74 mph (119 km/h) over a 13-mile (21 km) stretch. The Worsdell J class 4-2-2 was converted from compound to simple expansion working. (Note: Marsden has a relevant article.) The NBR had four classes of 4-4-0, the earliest by Drummond (Note: The same Dugald Drummond who was previously with Caledonian.) and the rest by Matthew Holmes. (Note: See Marsden).

For the LNWR, Webb compound engines were dominant and were being developed further for the fast three cylinder Teutonic 2-2-2-0 capable of well over 80 mph (130 km/h). It retained uncoupled driving wheels but had a larger boiler and good steam flow design. The Improved Precedent ("Jumbo") 2-4-0 was as fast but could not take such a heavy load. The Caledonian Railway was still running the Drummond 4-4-0s but now complemented by the Lambie version with increased boiler pressure and estimated by Nock to have averaged 75 mph (121 km/h) over an 11 miles (18 km) stretch.

In August up until the time of the serious racing, the express trains ran 8 to 15 carriages ("comparatively light", up to 175 long tons (178 t)) with the LNER and Caledonian double-heading when there were more than about 12 carriages. GNR never ran double-headed, pulling up to 190 long tons (190 tonnes). Then during the crucial period, the East Coast ran six carriages (one bogie sleeping carriage, three six-wheeler carriages, two brake vans) and the West Coast, single-heading, ran four passenger bogie carriages, about 95 long tons (97 tonnes). North of Edinburgh and Perth both trains were reduced by one carriage. Thus passenger accommodation was very comparable. Changing of engines could be done in as little as 90 seconds.

=== Fastest runs ===
Oswald Nock summarised the four fastest runs in the following table. He chose stretches of line roughly equal in length and level in aggregate. Each contained one "severe slack" that required slow running. He notes that on Hardwicke's run the train also had the same average speed over a more difficult section of 75.8 miles (122.0 km) over Shap summit.

		Whyte class	Load long tons	Ratio engine/train weight	Location	Distance miles	Time minutes	Average speed mph (km/h)
GNR	Stirling No. 775	4-2-2	101	2.98	Barkston–Naburn	74.3	65.75	67.7 (109.0)
NER	Worsdell M No. 1620	4-4-0	101	2.8	Longhirst–Dunbar	75.0	66.75	67.3 (108.3)
LNWR	Precedent Hardwicke	2-4-0	72.5	2.95	Minshull Vernon–Carnforth	73.4	64.5	68.3 (109.9)
CR	Lambie No. 17	4-4-0	72.5	2.46	Stanley Junc.–Ferryhill Junc.	82.0	69.0	71.3 (114.7)

Nock picks out another exceptional run of a rather different nature. In the early hours of 22 August, the NBR Holmes No. 293 4-4-0 left Waverley for Dundee with a load of 86 tons. The run, starting and finishing from at rest unlike the runs tabulated above and involving severe curves and other speed restrictions, took 59 minutes for the 59.2 miles (95.3 km), a speed of 60.2 mph (96.9 km/h). (Note: The run on 19 August by the same locomotive was 64.25 minutes.) Nock, writing towards the end of the steam era in 1958, says that since World War I no train had done the run in less than 80 minutes. (Note: The fastest scheduled time in 2013, stopping at Edinburgh Haymarket, is 63 minutes.)

== Aftermath of the 1895 races ==
North British considered restarting the competition with Conacher writing to Oakley "Although I share to the full your opinion regarding the childishness of the whole business ... I am quite prepared to run another train as much like theirs as possible, when I have no doubt we could again shew our superiority". To achieve the high speeds very few carriages could be pulled and so a second, longer, slower train had to follow on behind. There was no benefit to the public in arriving so very early and, apart from the publicity, it made no financial sense. For all these reasons the racing was not resumed. In a leading article The Engineer magazine concluded "One gratifying result of the race will be perhaps to silence the boasting of the American press. The far-famed Empire State Express has been thoroughly beaten...".

In July 1896, a West Coast overnight express took the curve at Preston excessively fast and derailed. One person was killed and the train was wrecked. Two "Jumbos" had been double-heading the train and the enquiry found that the only experience either driver had on the line had always involved stopping at Preston. To reassure the public, agreement was reached to slow the runs from London to Edinburgh and Glasgow to take a minimum time of eight hours. This agreement, which gave much the same journey time as in 1889, lasted into the early 1930s, removing any impetus towards improving express train performance or scheduling.

== Later rivalry ==
With the end of specially staged train races, later rivalries between the West Coast and East Coast routes centred on timetabled services based largely on improvements in traction technologies.

=== London to Edinburgh, 1901 ===
For its summer 1901 service, the Midland Railway and NBR consortium announced the 09:30 London St Pancras express – on the Settle & Carlisle and Waverley lines – would arrive in Edinburgh at 18:05, ten minutes before the GNR/NER Flying Scotsman. Concerned that a possibly delayed Midland train could lead to Portobello East junction becoming like Kinnaber, NER rescheduled their train for 18:02 and then earlier, ignoring the 1896 agreement. The press were anxious to promote this as another "Race to the North" and started publicising Caledonian arrival times as well. Indeed, Caledonian and then NER put on fast runs for a few days but NBR backed down, and the sparring came to an end.

=== LNER and LMS ===
In 1923, under the Railways Act 1921 which grouped multiple railway companies together into four large ones, the ECML came under control of the amalgamated London and North Eastern Railway (LNER) whilst the WCML came under the London, Midland and Scottish Railway (LMS).

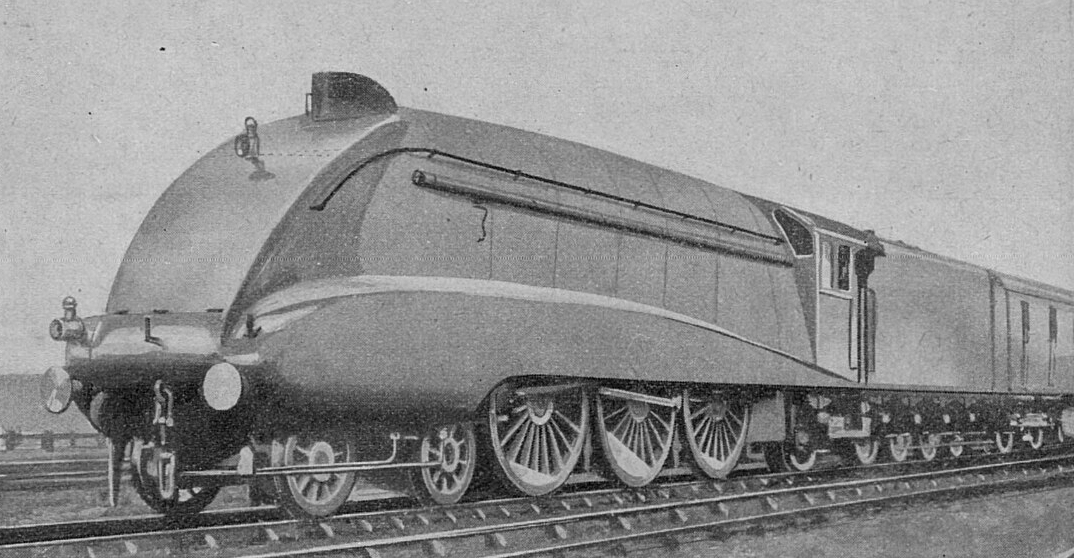
A LNER Class A4

In May 1928, the LNER started the famous non-stop Flying Scotsman express train from London King's Cross to Edinburgh. The time respected the old agreement and so was nothing special, but the length of the non-stop run over the whole distance of 393 miles (632 km) was new. This was done by means of a special corridor tender which allowed engine crew changes at speed. However to show that the old rivalry was not dead, just prior to the inaugural date of the LNER train, the LMS thwarted them by running the Royal Scot in two portions non-stop from London Euston to Glasgow (401.4 miles/646.0 km) and London to Edinburgh (399.7 miles/643.3 km) on 27 April 1928. These were operated respectively by one of the new Royal Scot locomotives and by a standard LMS Compound 4-4-0 locomotive both with volunteer crews. However, the run was not repeated.

Following the successful launching of the German Flying Hamburger high-speed diesel railcar set in 1933 and the Bugatti cars in France, the LNER began to examine the possibilities of introducing similar trains for key services. On examining German specifications, management concluded that better speed and accommodation should be possible using steam locomotive powered trains. To test the feasibility of this a high-speed trial was run in 1934 between London and Leeds using locomotive 4472 Flying Scotsman, then in still in A1 condition, but with already modified valve gear. During this run, the first fully authenticated speed of 100 mph (160 km/h) was reached. On a similar test run from London to Newcastle and back, A3 locomotive 2750 Papyrus reached 108 mph (174 km/h), a world record for a non-streamlined steam locomotive. When the streamlined London-Newcastle and Silver Jubilee service was inaugurated, the specially built A4 Pacifics exceeded all records, starting with a top speed of 112 mph (180 km/h) on the inaugural run. The high-speed service was extended to Edinburgh in 1937 with the introduction of The Coronation.

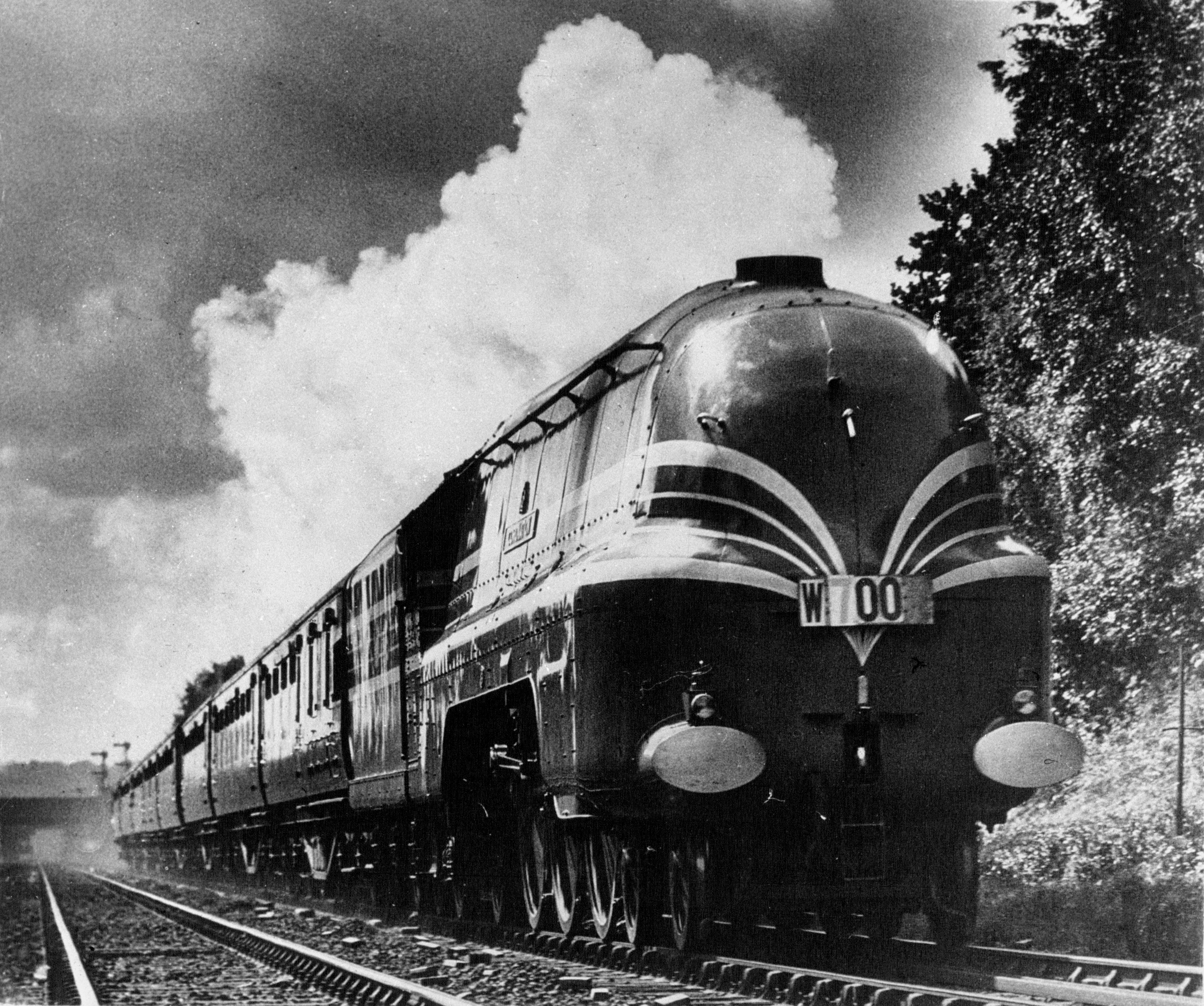
The LMS Coronation Scot in 1937

The LMS again countered in 1937 with the London-Glasgow Coronation Scot streamlined train for which an updated Pacific locomotive type, the Princess Coronation Class, was also specially developed. These locomotives proved fully equal to the A4 and on a press run between Euston and Crewe, 6220 Coronation briefly snatched away the world speed record with a top speed of 114 mph (183 km/h). The speed record however caused a scare; it was reached just 2 miles (3.2 km) south of Crewe railway station, and the train was unable to slow down sufficiently for the series of crossover points at the approach to the station, which it entered at 57 mph (92 km/h), well above the speed limit of 20 mph (32 km/h). The train stayed on the tracks, but nearly derailed, this caused enough alarm for the LMS not to make another attempt at a speed record.

The following year on 3 July 1938, the LNER reclaimed the speed record, when 4468 Mallard set a new record of 126 miles per hour (203 km/h) on Stoke Bank. A record which still stands to this day. The outbreak of World War II from 1939, and subsequent postwar nationalisation to form British Railways in 1948, curtailed further rivalry between the east and west coast routes.

=== British Rail ===
In 1979, British Rail set a new record of 3 hours 52 minutes on the 401-mile (645 km) length of the WCML between Euston and Glasgow with its experimental Advanced Passenger Train (APT). This record for the northbound run still stands, although the southbound record was broken in 2006 by the APT's spiritual successor, the Class 390 Pendolino with a time of 3 hours 55 minutes, and an average speed of 102.4 mph (164.8 km/h). However, these times cannot be regularly achieved on the WCML under normal operating conditions as it requires other services on the line to be specially re-timed to give the train a non-stop express from Glasgow to London.

In contrast, the modern Flying Scotsman operated by London North Eastern Railway on the East Coast route, can achieve this within 3 hours 59 minutes on a normal service pattern, and with a stop at Newcastle – however, still making for an average speed of 98.7 mph (158.8 km/h).

== The two routes today ==
When Britain's railways were privatised in the mid-1990s, the East Coast and West Coast routes were now once again operated by two different companies – GNER and Virgin Trains West Coast. Between 2015 and 2018, both routes operated under the Virgin Trains brand, albeit with Virgin Trains East Coast being mostly a Stagecoach Group operation. This ended in June 2018 when the East Coast franchise returned to public ownership, under the revived LNER name.

== See also ==
- Top Gear's Race to the North, a 21st-century interpretation by Top Gear pitting a car, bike and steam locomotive in a race from London to Edinburgh.
