= Single (locomotive) =

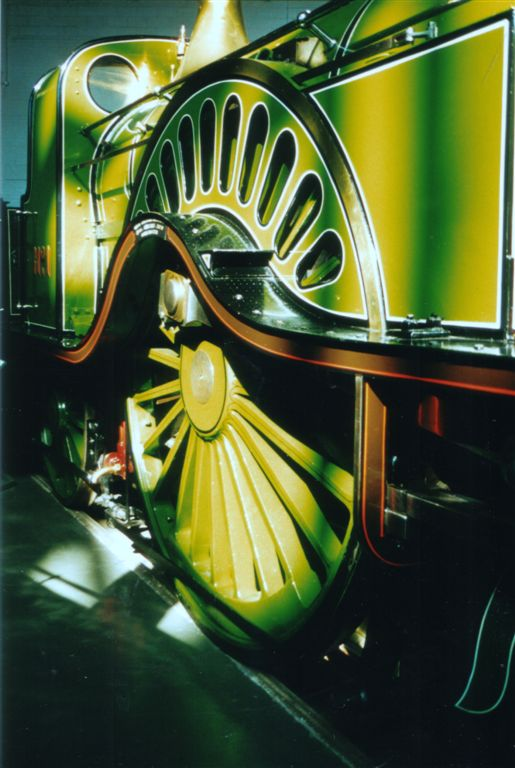
A Stirling Single.

In railway terminology, a single is a steam locomotive with a single pair of driving wheels. Some sources use 'Single' only for the 2-2-2 type, but more commonly singles could have any number of leading or trailing wheels.

== See also ==
- Caledonian Railway Single
- Crampton locomotive
- GWR 3031 Class
- GNR Stirling 4-2-2
- Midland Railway 115 Class
