= LNER Class Q1 =

Class Q1 was a class designation applied to several London and North Eastern Railway locomotives. Locomotive classes called Q1 include:

- GNR Class K1 0-8-0 (later LNER Class Q1)
- LNER Thompson Class Q1 0-8-0T
