= Benjamin Cubitt =

Engineer

- Born: 1795; Norfolk, Kingdom of Great Britain
- Died: 12 January 1848 (aged 52–53)
- Occupation: Engineer
- Parent: Joseph Cubitt (1760-1829)
- Relatives: William Cubitt (brother), Joseph Cubitt (nephew)

Benjamin Cubitt (1795 – 12 January 1848) was an English locomotive engineer. Born in Norfolk, he was the brother of William Cubitt who was a consultant to the Great Northern Railway. He was the first Locomotive Engineer of the GNR. He took up the position in 1846, after having served as the head of the joint committee of the Brighton, Croydon and Dover Railways.

== See also ==
Locomotives of the Great Northern Railway

== Sources ==
- Benjamin Cubitt
- Benjamin Cubitt - Graces Guide
