= GNR Class J9 =

Class of British steam locomotives

GNR Class J9 LNER Class J7
Type and origin
- Power type: Steam
- Designer: Patrick Stirling
- Builder: Doncaster Works
- Serial number: 692–791
- Build date: 1896
- Total produced: 10 (original production)
- Rebuild date: 1924-1926
- Number rebuilt: 5
Specifications
- Configuration
  - Whyte: 0-6-0
  - UIC: C n2
- Gauge: 4 ft 8 1/2 in (1,435 mm)
- Driver dia.: 4 ft 8 in (1.422 m)
- Wheelbase: 15 ft 6 in (4.7 m)
- Axle load: 15.5 long tons (15.7 t)
- Loco weight: 38.1 long tons (38.7 t)
- Tender weight: 34.9 long tons (35.5 t)
- Total weight: 73.0 long tons (74.2 t)
- Fuel type: Coal
- Firebox
  - Grate area: 16.25 sq ft (1.51 m^{2})
- Boiler: 4 ft 5 in (1.3 m) (original); 4 ft 8 in (1.4 m) (LNER rebuilds)
- Boiler pressure: 170 psi (1.17 MPa)
- Heating surface
  - Firebox: 103 sq ft (9.6 m^{2})
  - Tubes: 1,016 sq ft (94.4 m^{2})
  - Total surface: 1,119 sq ft (104.0 m^{2})
- Cylinders: Two, inside
- Cylinder size: 17 1/2 in × 26 in (444 mm × 660 mm)
- Valve gear: Stephenson valve gear
- Valve type: Slide
Performance figures
- Tractive effort: 20,548 lbf (91.4 kN)
Career
- Operators: Great Northern Railway; → London and North Eastern Railway
- Numbers: GNR: 1021–1030; → LNER: 4021–4030
- Withdrawn: 1927–1936
- Disposition: All scrapped

The GNR Class J9 was a class of two-cylinder steam locomotives of the 0-6-0 wheel arrangement, built in 1896 for the Great Northern Railway.

== History ==
The Class J9s were based on the GNR Class J10, but featured wider cabs and used a different diameter boiler. Ten units were built in 1896, whilst later on, the Class J10s were refitted with the J9's boiler. In GNR service, the J10s were primarily used on heavily graded lines near Leeds and Bradford, and were nicknamed the "West Riding Goods Engines". When the Great Northern Railway was merged into the new London and North Eastern Railway, seven of the original J9s were still in service, whilst three converted J10s were also transferred; both classes were renamed as the LNER Class J7. Between 1924 and 1926, five members of the class were fitted with the 4 ft 8 in (1.4 m) diameter boilers that were also being fitted to the LNER Class J3s. The LNER relegated the class to local traffic, and began withdrawing them in 1927. In 1936, the last remaining member of the class, No. 4027, was withdrawn from Ardsley, with no units being preserved.
