= Caledonian Railway Single =

Scottish steam locomotive

Caledonian Railway No. 123
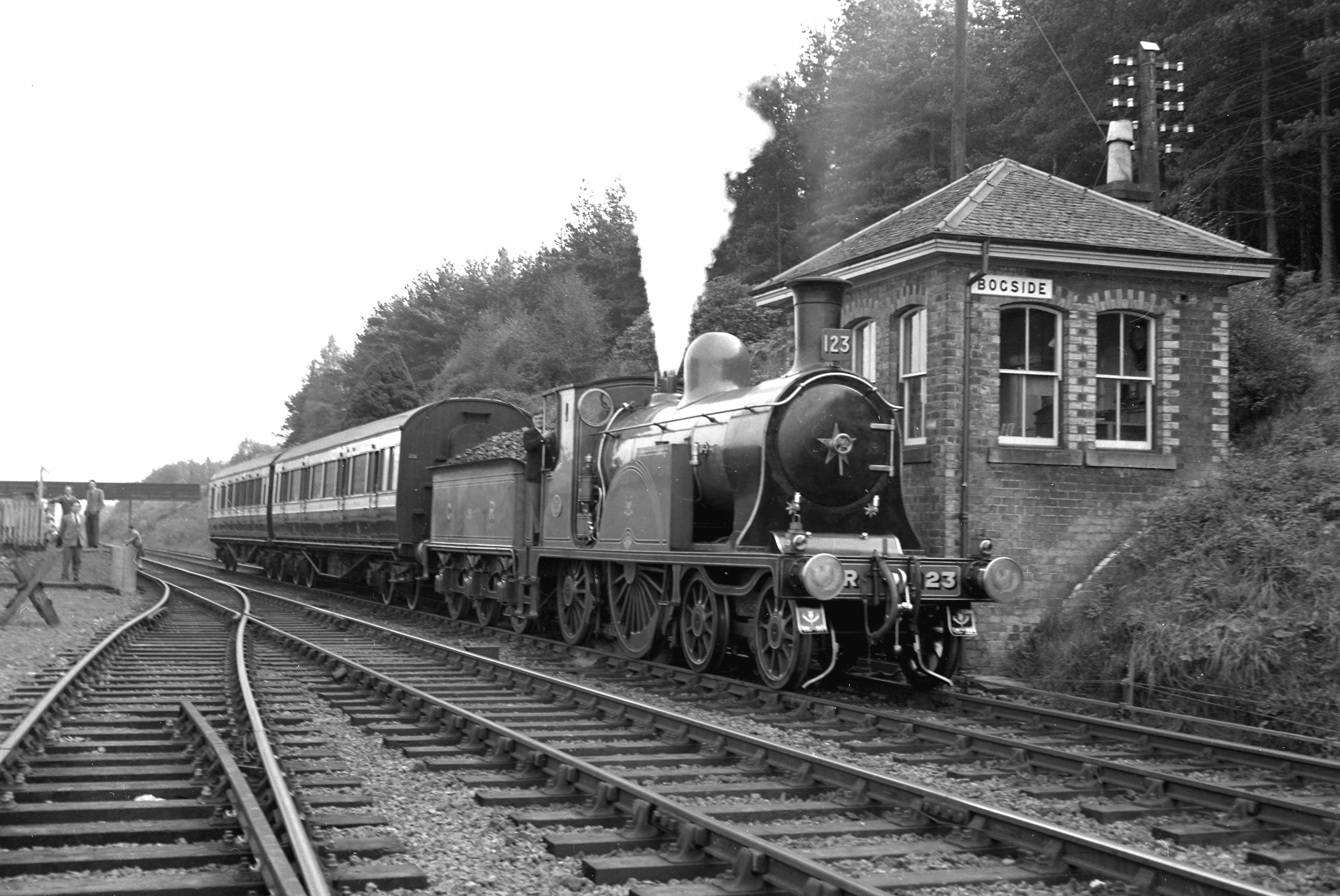
Type and origin
- Power type: Steam
- Designer: Dugald Drummond
- Builder: Neilson & Co.
- Serial number: 3553
- Build date: 1886
- Total produced: 1
Specifications
- Configuration
  - Whyte: 4-2-2
- Gauge: 4 ft 8 1/2 in (1,435 mm) standard gauge
- Driver dia.: 7 ft 0 in (2.134 m)
- Loco weight: 41.35 long tons (42.01 t; 46.31 short tons)
- Boiler pressure: 160 psi (1.10 MPa)
- Cylinders: Two, inside
- Cylinder size: 18 in × 26 in (457 mm × 660 mm)
Performance figures
- Tractive effort: 13,638 lbf (60.7 kN)
Career
- Operators: Caledonian Railway; → London, Midland and Scottish Railway
- Power class: LMS: 1P
- Numbers: CR: 123; → CR: 1123; → LMS: 14010
- Withdrawn: 1935
- Disposition: Preserved on static display at Riverside Museum, Glasgow

Caledonian Railway Single No. 123 is a one-off preserved Scottish steam locomotive. The unique 4-2-2 was built by Neilson and Company in 1886, works No. 3553, as an exhibition locomotive. In 1914 it was placed on the Caledonian Railway duplicate list, and renumbered 1123. It entered London, Midland and Scottish Railway service in 1923 and the LMS renumbered it 14010 and gave it the power classification 1P. During the 1920s it was allocated to working the directors' saloon, but it was returned to ordinary service in 1930. The locomotive was withdrawn in 1935, by which time it was the last single-wheeled express engine running in Britain, and set aside for preservation.

This engine could reach speeds of up to 60 mph (97 km/h).

Restored to steam by British Railways in 1958, it ran railtours and enthusiast specials until the end of steam in Scotland.

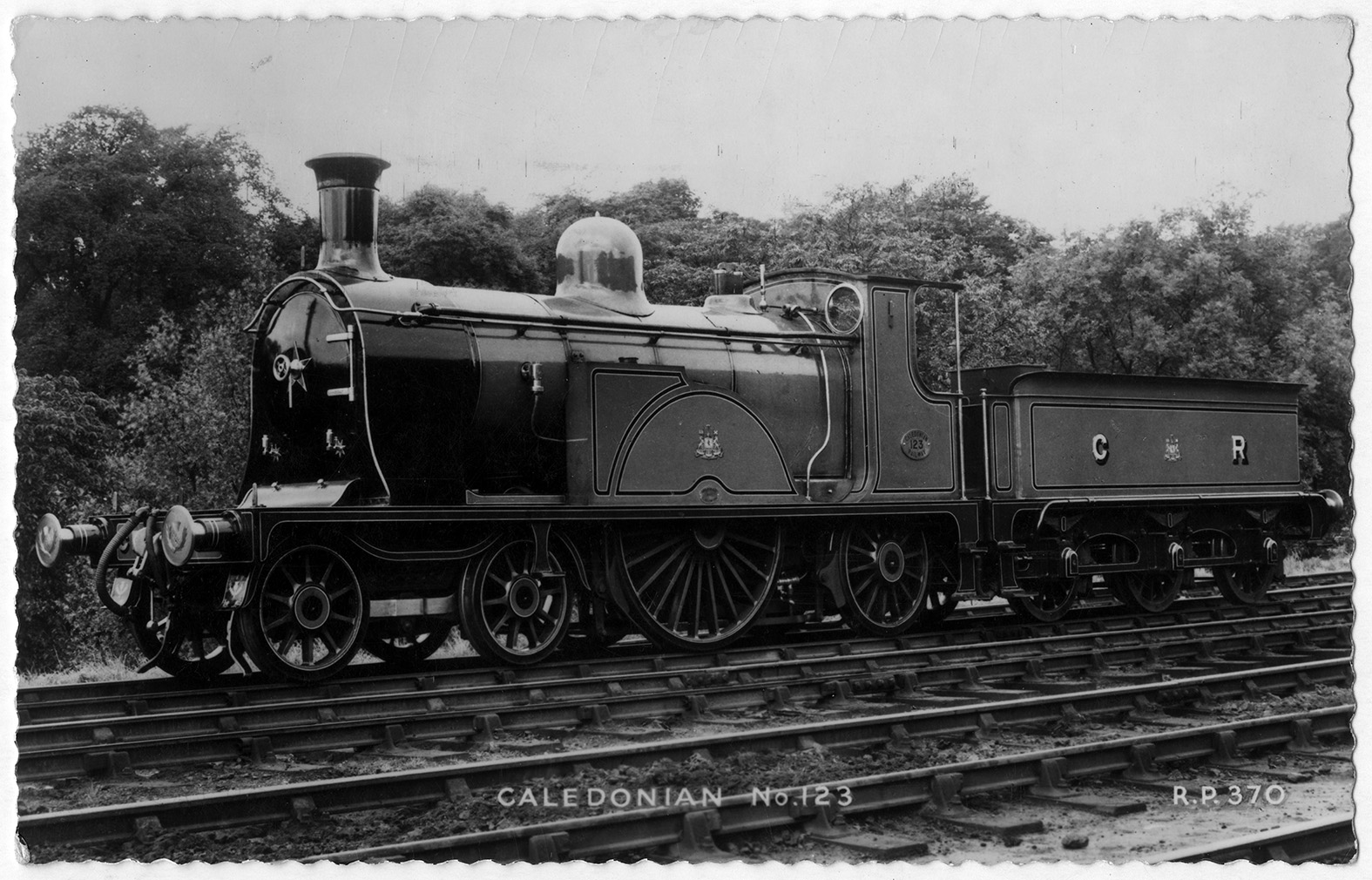
Postcard bought in London antique market in 2002

== History ==
No. 123 was designed by the Caledonian Railway's chief locomotive engineer Dugald Drummond in partnership with Neilson and Company which built the locomotive. The engine was a one-off design intended to represent both the railway and the builder at the International Exhibition of Industry, Science and Art held in Edinburgh rather than to fulfill any specific need for such a locomotive by the Caledonian. At the time single-driver locomotives were out of favour with railway companies due to their limited grip, poor acceleration, limited hill-climbing ability and low tractive effort with increasingly-heavy trains. The few that remained in service were restricted to long runs on flat terrain with lightweight carriages.

Drummond adapted No. 123's design from his recently introduced 66 Class 4-4-0 design (new examples of which were still being introduced to service when No. 123 was constructed). As locomotive superintendent of the Caledonian and designer of the 66 Class, protocol of the time dictated that Drummond was credited with the design of No. 123. However it is believed that William Weir (Drummond's chief draughtsman at the St. Rollox railway works) and Edward Snowball (Weir's counterpart at Neilson's) carried out the actual adaptation and design of the new Single. Drummond and the Caledonian also co-operated with another major Scottish locomotive builder, Dübs and Company, to produce a second engine for the same Exhibition. This resulted in Caledonian No. 124, a 4-4-0 which was, in essence, a more powerful 66 Class. Both engines were awarded gold medals for the Caledonian and their respective builders.

The 'Exhibition Engine' used the same boiler, cylinders and front bogie as the 66 Class but an enlarged single driving wheel of seven feet (2.1 metres) diameter and a single trailing axle. Drummond had already designed a sanding system for the 66 Class. Sand was stored in sandboxes incorporated into the splasher for each front driving wheel and sprayed onto the track ahead of the driving wheels by compressed air supplied from the main air reservoir for the locomotive's Westinghouse air brake system. This was more efficient and reliable than the previous sanding systems which relied purely on gravity; it allowed the driver to apply sand to the rails to greatly improve adhesion in difficult conditions. Such a system would overcome the 'single' type's primary drawback of starting heavy trains from a standstill while retaining its ability to cover long distances at high speeds. The same system was therefore incorporated into No. 123.

The year of the Caledonian Single's construction saw the invention of the steam sander by Francis Holt of the Midland Railway which in turn led to the introduction of the Midland's own 'Spinner' singles. The effectiveness of the sanding gear fitted to No. 123 and the Caledonian engine's strong performance coupled to the invention of Holt's steam sanding gear (which was more useful to the majority of British railway companies that used vacuum brakes rather than the Westinghouse system) led to a revival in the use of the 'single' for express passenger work in the late 19th century.

No. 123 became nationally famous during the Race to the North of August 1888 when the companies on the east- and west-coast main lines between London and Edinburgh competed to have the fastest times. During the month of the 'races', No. 123 was employed to work West Coast expresses on the Caledonian's section of the route between Carlisle and Edinburgh - a distance of 100 miles (160 kilometres) including the climbs to Beattock Summit and Shotts Summit. With special trains consisting of only two or three carriages and with signalling paths cleared in advance No. 123 frequently averaged more than 50 mph (80 km/h) over the route and on one occasion completed the journey non-stop in 101 minutes - an average speed of 59 mph (95 km/h) which confirmed the locomotive's performance abilities. As the only Caledonian engine capable of maintaining such speeds and the only one of its type, No. 123 was also used consistently throughout the month of the Races, being used on the fast northbound express every day for four weeks, which also proved the locomotive's reliability.

Following its appearance at the 1886 exhibition the locomotive was retained for special duties by the Caledonian, being used for double heading express trains over Beattock Summit and working inspectors' and directors' trains with only one or two saloon carriages. It was also the Caledonian's favoured engine to act as pilot to the Royal Train which frequently used the Caledonian Main Line when transporting the royal family to and from Balmoral Castle. The Royal Train pilot ran light-engine 15 minutes ahead of the Royal Train itself, to warn of the train's approach and as a safety measure to ensure the line was clear and safe. Requiring high speeds and with no load, the Single was ideal for these duties.

In 1914, it was placed on the Caledonian Railway duplicate list and renumbered 1123 (its original number 123 was then used for a 43 Class 4-4-0 delivered in May 1914). It entered London, Midland and Scottish Railway service in 1923 and the LMS renumbered it 14010 and gave it the power classification 1P. During the 1920s it was painted in LMS Maroon, and allocated to working the directors' saloon, but was returned to regular service on the Dundee to Perth mainline in 1930, painted LMS black. The locomotive was withdrawn in 1935, by which time it was the last single-wheeled express engine running in Britain, and set aside for preservation.

Restored to steam by British Railways in 1958, it ran railtours and enthusiast specials until the end of steam in Scotland. The engine is currently a static exhibit in the Riverside Museum in Pointhouse Place, Kelvinhaugh, Glasgow, to which it was moved when the former transport museum at Kelvinhall was closed.

== Preserved service log ==
- 15 September 1963 - The 'Scottish Belle' Railtour to Horsted Keynes and Brighton, 123 double-headed with preserved Drummond LSWR T9 class No. 30120
- The Solway Ranger Railtour - 13 June 1964

== Models ==
Triang Railways first produced a OO scale model of the Caledonian Single in 1963, which has been released several times over the years, first under Triang and then later by Hornby. In 2025, Rapido Trains UK announced a brand new OO scale model of the Caledonian Single under their "Scottish Legends" locomotive theme.

== See also ==
- Locomotives of the Caledonian Railway
