= GNR Classes D2 and D3 =

Two related classes of British 4-4-0 locomotives

GNR Classes D3 and D2 LNER Classes D3 and D4
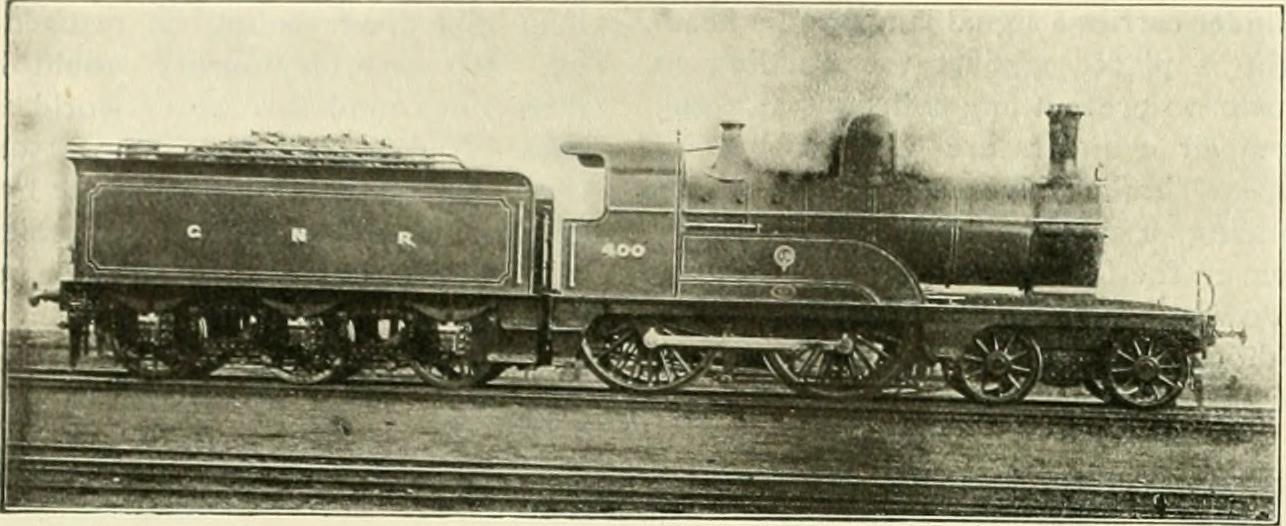
Type and origin
- Power type: Steam
- Designer: Henry Alfred Ivatt
- Builder: Doncaster Works
- Build date: 1896-1899
- Total produced: 51 (later 49)
Specifications
- Configuration
  - Whyte: 4-4-0
  - UIC: D4: 2′B′n2; D3: 2′B′n2
- Gauge: 4 ft 8 1/2 in (1,435 mm)
- Leading dia.: 3 ft 8 in (1,117.600 mm)
- Driver dia.: 6 ft 8 in (2,032.000 mm)
- Wheelbase: 42 ft 10 in (13.06 m)
- Height: 13 ft 9 in (4.19 m) (later cut down to 13 ft 1/2 in (3.98 m) by the LNER)
- Axle load: D4: 14.45 long tons (14.7 t; 16.2 short tons); D3: 15.7 long tons (16.0 t; 17.6 short tons)
- Loco weight: D4: 84.2 long tons (85.55 t; 94.30 short tons); D3: 81.85 long tons (83.16 t; 91.67 short tons)
- Fuel type: Coal
- Firebox
  - Type: Round-top
  - Grate area: 16.25 sq ft (1.510 m^{2})
- Boiler
  - Model: D4: 4 ft 5 in (1.3 m); D3:4 ft 8 in (1.4 m)
  - Type: D4: LNER Diagram 11; D3: LNER Diagram 8
- Boiler pressure: 175 psi (1.21 MPa)
- Heating surface
  - Firebox: D4: 103 sq ft (9.6 m^{2}); D3: 105 sq ft (9.8 m^{2})
  - Tubes: D4: 1,016 sq ft (94.4 m^{2}); D3: 1,130 sq ft (105 m^{2})
  - Total surface: D4: 1,119 sq ft (104.0 m^{2}); D3: 1,235 sq ft (114.7 m^{2})
- Cylinders: Two, inside
- Cylinder size: 17.5 in × 26 in (444 mm × 660 mm)
- Valve gear: Stephenson valve gear
- Valve type: Slide
Performance figures
- Tractive effort: 14,805 lbf (65.86 kN)
Career
- Numbers: GNR: 400, 1301-1320, 1341-1360; LNER (until 1945/46): 3400, 4301-4320, 4341-4360
- Withdrawn: D4: 1912-1928; D3: 1935–1951
- Disposition: All of the D4s rebuilt as D3s, two D3s rebuilt as D2s, all of the D3s scrapped

The GNR Classes D2 and D3 were two classes of 51 4-4-0 steam locomotives designed by Henry Ivatt for the Great Northern Railway (GNR). They were the first 4-4-0s to be introduced by the GNR, and Ivatt's first original design for the railway as well.

== GNR Class D2/LNER Class D4 ==
The first member, No. 400, emerged from Doncaster Works in December 1896. Between May 1897 and December 1899, fifty more locomotives were built. The last ten, Nos. 1351-1360 (LNER Nos. 4351–4360) were built with a raised running plate above the coupling rods to match the Small Atlantics that were being introduced at this time. Unlike most 4-4-0s of the era, the D2s were intended for secondary duties from their conception. As well as stopping passenger trains, the D2s could also be seen as pilots to the Stirling Singles on heavy express trains. Another duty for the class was light express passenger trains.

The D2s initially suffered from their bogies being prone to cracking, and between 1909 and 1921 extra plates were added to replace their bogie frames, which were also 2.5 inches deeper. After 1921, their frames were strengthened further and more plates were placed within them. Under the LNER, the D2s were reclassified as D4s. Following the Grouping, both they and the D3s moved to former Great Central Railway and North Eastern Railway sheds.

== GNR Class D3/LNER Class D3 ==
In 1912, Nigel Gresley replaced Ivatt as chief mechanical engineer for the GNR. That same year, he introduced a new 4 ft 8 in boiler for the D2s and the GNR J5 0-6-0s. Although the firebox was shorter, the overall area of 105 square feet was two square feet more than the D2s. The first member to be rebuilt was No. 1359 in November 1912, six months after J5 No. 1163. The rebuild also involved shortening the chimney and raising the boiler. By 1923, six as-built D2s (now classified as D4s) remained. The last member to be rebuilt was No. 4358 in June 1928. In 1923, No. 1305N was rebuilt with slightly larger tubes and a larger firebox. In this form, it became part of the LNER D2 Class, which had seventy other previous locomotives built between 1898 and 1909. In 1926, No. 4320 was also rebuilt, bringing a class total of seventy-two D2s. The D3s meanwhile had forty-nine members left in service.

In the 1930s, the Stainmore Route in County Durham, which ran from Darlington to Penrith, was in need of more locomotives to replace the LNER D23 Class 4-4-0s. Initially LNER J21 Class engines had been tried, but these tended to have motion failures, particularly after descending the line's banks due to a habit drivers had when it came to driving the class in these areas. It was decided to test D3s on the line to see if they would perform better. To do so, they were fitted with larger cabs and side windows for better crew protection. However, the class proved to be unsuited for the Stainmore line. In 1944, No. 4075 was fitted with a Thompson cab and, after World War II, was painted in LNER apple green, the only member of her class to carry this livery.

== Withdrawals ==
Withdrawals began as early as 1935, with Nos. 4308 and 4360 being taken out of service in October. By the start of World War II, only thirty-five were left, though only No. 4304 was withdrawn during the war in 1942. Mass withdrawals picked up starting in February 1946. However, thirty-one members did survive long enough to get renumbered under Thompson's renumbering scheme. Nineteen survived into British Railways ownership in 1948, but only three members survived long enough to get renumbered. The final member withdrawn was No. 62000 on 18 October 1951, being the last surviving GNR 4-4-0 in operation. All members of the class were ultimately scrapped.
