= GNR 521 Class =

Class of British steam locomotives

GNR Ivatt 521 Class and Gresley 536 Class (J22) LNER Class J6
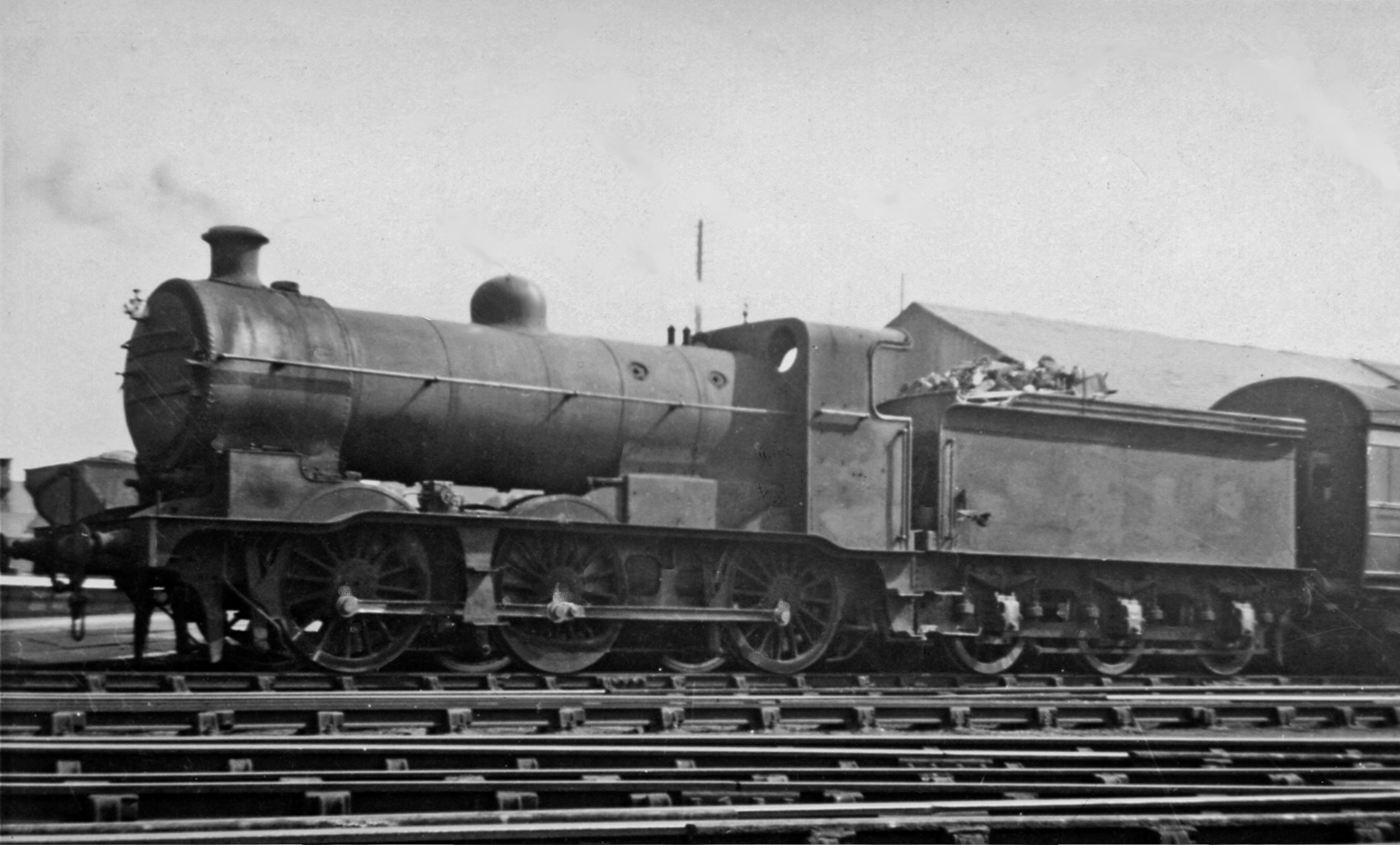
- Gresley J6 No. 4199 at Grantham 1947
Type and origin
- Power type: Steam
- Designer: Henry Ivatt and Nigel Gresley
- Builder: Doncaster Works
- Build date: August 1911-September 1922
- Total produced: 110
Specifications
- Configuration
  - Whyte: 0-6-0
  - UIC: C h2
- Gauge: 4 ft 8 1/2 in (1,435 mm) standard gauge
- Driver dia.: 5 ft 2 in (1,575 mm)
- Tender wheels: 4 ft 2 in (1,270 mm)
- Wheelbase: 38 ft 10 in (11.84 m)
  - Engine: 16 ft 3 in (4.95 m)
  - Tender: 13 ft (4.0 m)
- Length: 52 ft 6 in (16,002.00 mm)
- Axle load: 18 long tons (20.16 short tons)
- Loco weight: 50 long tons 10 cwt (113,100 lb or 51.3 t)
- Tender weight: 43 long tons 2 cwt (96,500 lb or 43.8 t)
- Fuel type: Coal
- Fuel capacity: 6 long tons 10 cwt (14,600 lb or 6.6 t)
- Water cap.: 3,500 imp gal (16,000 L; 4,200 US gal)
- Boiler pressure: 170 lbf/in^{2} (1.17 MPa)
- Cylinders: Two, inside
- Cylinder size: 19 in × 26 in (483 mm × 660 mm)
- Valve gear: Stephenson
- Valve type: piston valves
Performance figures
- Tractive effort: 21,875 lbf (97.30 kN)
Career
- Operators: Great Northern Railway; → London and North Eastern Railway; → British Railways
- Class: GN: 521 class and 536 class; → GN: J22; → LNER: J6
- Power class: BR: 2P3F
- Numbers: GN: 521–610, 621–640; LNER (1923): 3521-3610, 3621-3640; LNER (1946): 4170-4279; BR: 64170-64279
- Nicknames: "Knick-Knacks"
- Withdrawn: 1955-1962
- Disposition: All scrapped

The Great Northern Railway 521 Class was a class of 0-6-0 steam locomotives, introduced in 1911. They were designed by Henry Ivatt for goods traffic. From 1912 to 1922 further examples, slightly modified by Nigel Gresley, were built and designated 536 Class. The most obvious difference was in the front sandboxes. These were below the running plate on the 521 but above it and merged with the front splashers, on the 536. The boiler and firebox were also moved back, thus resulting in a shortened cab. The London and North Eastern Railway classified them both as J6.

Initially, there was to be 120 members of this class. However, an order of ten was canceled so that Doncaster Works could build ten of Gresley's N2 Class 0-6-2 Tanks, which shared the same cylinders, boilers, valve gear, and piston valves as the J6s. The J6s had superheaters and piston valves operated by Stephenson valve gear.

== Operational history ==
Under GNR ownership, the fast goods work of the 521s and 536s was short-lived, as the arrival of the H2 Class Moguls in 1913 saw the class reassigned to lighter goods and occasional passenger traffic. The class was also used on coal trains between Colwick and Hornsey. All survived into LNER ownership in 1923, being reclassified as J6s. The LNER put the class to good use, with about twenty locomotives being allocated to the former Great Central network in 1923. These worked alongside the J10 Class and the J11 Class "Pom-Poms", with common duties for them being beer trains out of Burton, heavy coal trains, and excursions along the Lincolnshire coast. On multiple occasions, the class would go as fast as 66 mph (106.22 km/h). This is what led to them also being used on timed cross-country passenger trains from Grantham to Derby via Nottingham.

Seven members of the class were reallocated to the Northeast during World War II. This was to replace the forty J25s that were temporarily reallocated to the Great Western Railway. Some would also be temporarily based at Haymarket and around Newcastle.

== BR Days ==
All 110 locomotives passed to British Railways in 1948 and had 60000 added to their numbers. The arrival of the Thompson L1 Class Adriatic Tanks led to the J6s being taken off the Grantham to Derby services. Other than that, their jobs remained more or less the same. As a result of the 1955 Modernisation Plan, the J6s were withdrawn between 1955 and 1962, the last stand of the class being in the West Riding. All members of this class were scrapped.

== Modelling ==
Detail drawings and scale model kits are available from some suppliers.

== Sources ==
- Ian Allan ABC of British Railways Locomotives (1948 ed.). part 4, page 28.
