= GNR Stirling 4-2-2 =

British steam locomotive

GNR (UK) No. 1 class 4-2-2 Stirling Single
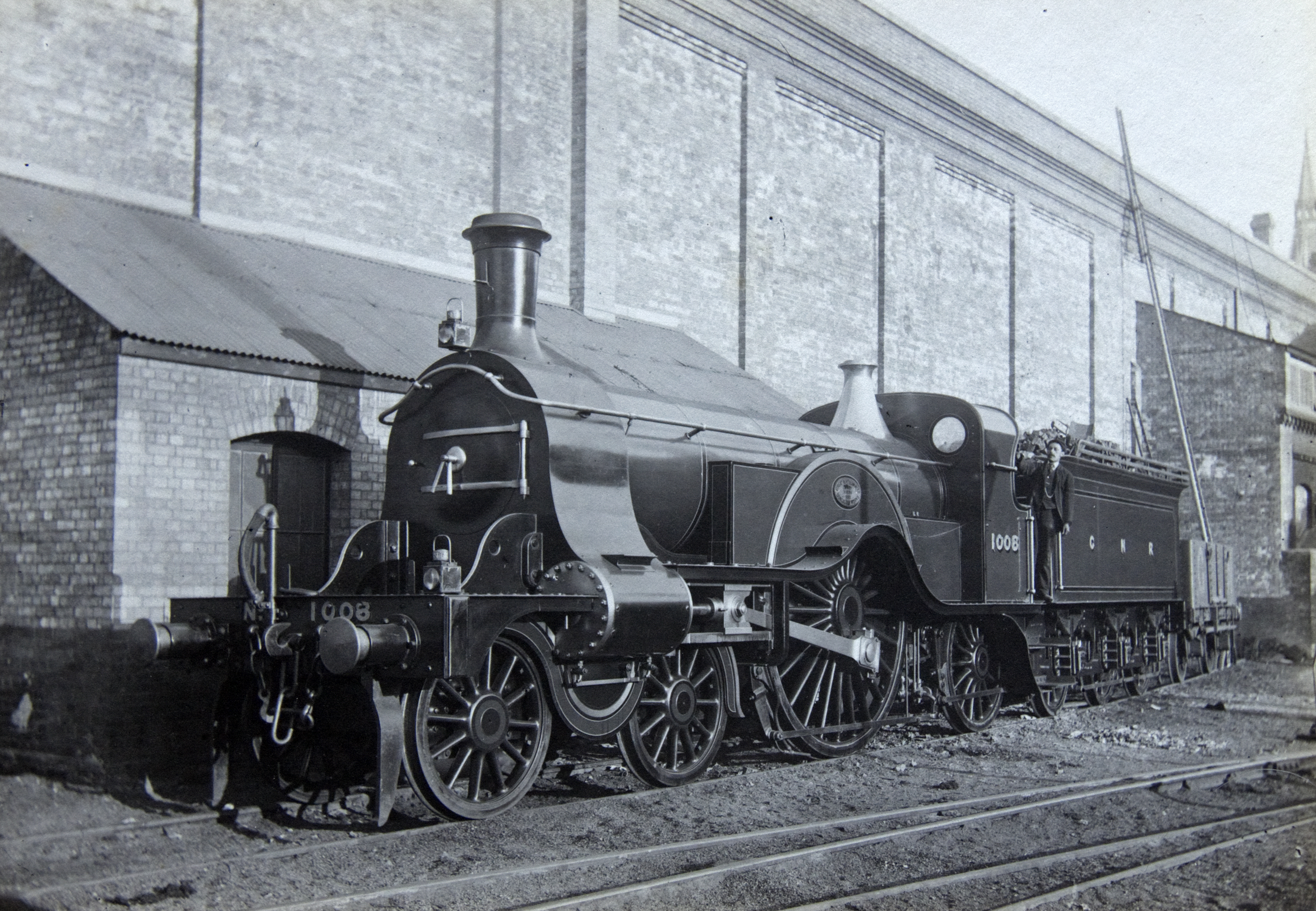
- GNR 1008
Type and origin
- Power type: Steam
- Designer: Patrick Stirling
- Builder: Doncaster Works
- Build date: 1870–1895
- Total produced: 53
Specifications
- Configuration
  - Whyte: 4-2-2
- Gauge: 4 ft 8 1/2 in (1,435 mm) standard gauge
- Leading dia.: 1870: 3 ft 11 in (1.194 m); 1887: 3 ft 11.5 in (1.207 m)
- Driver dia.: 1870: 8 ft 1 in (2.464 m); 1887: 8 ft 1.5 in (2.477 m)
- Trailing dia.: 1870: 4 ft 1 in (1.245 m); 1877: 4 ft 7 in (1.397 m); 1887: 4 ft 7.5 in (1.410 m)
- Length: 1870 Series: 50 ft 2 in (15.29 m); 1894 Series: 52 ft 11.75 in (16.1481 m)
- Loco weight: 1870 series: 39.45 long tons (40.08 t; 44.18 short tons); 1880 series: 45.15 long tons (45.87 t; 50.57 short tons); 1894 series: 48.75 long tons (49.53 t; 54.60 short tons)
- Fuel type: Coal
- Water cap.: 1870 Series: 2,470 imp gal (11,200 L; 2,970 US gal); 1880 Series: 2,900 imp gal (13,000 L; 3,500 US gal); 1894 Series: 3,850 imp gal (17,500 L; 4,620 US gal)
- Boiler
  - Diameter: 1870 Series: 4 ft 0.5 in (1.232 m); 1880 and 1894 Series: 4 ft 2 in (1.270 m)
- Boiler pressure: 1870 Series: 140 psi (970 kPa); 1880 Series: 150 psi (1,000 kPa); 1894 Series: 170 psi (1,200 kPa)
- Cylinders: two, outside
- Cylinder size: 1870 and 1880 Series: 18 in × 28 in (457 mm × 711 mm); 1894 Series: 19.5 in × 28 in (495 mm × 711 mm)
Performance figures
- Tractive effort: 1870 Series: 11,130 lbf (49.51 kN); 1880 Series: 11,925 lbf (53.05 kN); 1894 Series: 15,779 lbf (70.19 kN)
Career
- Operators: Great Northern Railway
- Class: A1, A2, A3
- Nicknames: Stirling Single; Eight–footer
- Withdrawn: 1899-1916
- Preserved: No. 1
- Current owner: National Collection
- Disposition: One preserved, remainder scrapped

The Great Northern Railway (GNR) No. 1 class Stirling Single is a class of steam locomotive designed for express passenger work. Designed by Patrick Stirling, they are characterised by a single pair of large (8 ft 1 in) driving wheels which led to the nickname "eight-footer". Originally the locomotive was designed to haul up to 26 passenger carriages at an average speed of 47 miles per hour (76 km/h). They could reach speeds of up to 85 mph (137 km/h).

== Development ==
On his arrival at GNR, Stirling set out to standardise the railway's rolling stock. He also borrowed a 'single-wheeler' from the Great Eastern Railway and, in 1868, designed two versions of a 2-2-2 arrangement with 7 ft 1 in (2.159 m) driving wheels.

The outcome in 1870 was a locomotive with 8 ft 1 in (2.464 m) driving wheels with 18 in × 28 in (457 mm × 711 mm) outside cylinders, designed specifically for high-speed expresses between York and London. The British norm at the time was inside cylinders. However, not only were there frequent failures of the cranked axle shafts, with such large driving wheels they would have set the boiler too high. Stirling therefore used outside cylinders, with a four-wheeled bogie for lateral stability at the front end. According to Hamilton Ellis's description, entitled 'Pat Stirling's masterpiece,' the design was a version of a 2-2-2 built by Stirling for the Glasgow and South Western Railway, "considerably enlarged, and provided with a leading bogie."

A total of 53 were built at Doncaster Works between 1870 and 1895, often being built in 'pairs' rather than batches. Stirling modified the class as each member was built, adding details and adjusting features on almost every individual locomotive. As a result, there was hardly any standardisation; "whilst each pair were often identical, other members of the class were merely ‘sister' engines, as in many cases changes were instituted between the building of each successive pair."

=== 1870 Series ===
The prototype engine, No. 1, was built in 1870 but proved to be a poor steamer that suffered from numerous teething troubles, including troublesome balanced slide valves, a blast pipe that was too high, and a firebox that was too small. Within a few weeks, the blast pipe would be adjusted and made standard for the rest of the class, but it would take another 7 years for its firebox to be enlarged. Other No. 1-specific details included 11 splasher slots instead of 10, slide rods with a fishbelly shape, and a special, X-shaped bogie frame.

The next two locomotives were No. 8, built around December 1870, and No. 33, built on 15 March 1871. Learning from No. 1, they featured a boiler with more boiler tubes and a longer wheelbase to carry a larger firebox. Stirling also incorporated experimental water midfeathers in the fireboxes instead of a conventional brick arch, but these do not seem to have been successful and were removed some time later.

However, the new firebox and boiler dimensions proved satisfactory and were applied to the next 24 locomotives. Regardless, Stirling still took the time to experiment with different boiler tube and firebox crown dimensions with individual locomotives.

Following the Newark brake trials of 1875 and the Abbots Ripton rail accident in January 1876, the GNR made Smith's simple, non-automatic vacuum brake standard on all its passenger stock, and Nos. 221 and 94 of 1876 were the first members of the class built with the new brake apparatus that consisted of an arrangement of pipes and ejectors wrapping around the smokebox. These two locomotives were also built with better springing for smoother rides, with the trailing wheel diameter increasing from 4 ft 1 in (1.245 m) to 4 ft 7 in (1.397 m). All three features became class standard, and the older locomotives would be progressively updated.

=== 1880 Series ===
No. 1 was due for an overhaul in 1880 and, once again, served as the prototype for a large redesign of the class. It left the works with a larger boiler of diameter 4 ft 2 in (1.270 m) pitched higher above the rails with a pressure of 150 psi (1,000 kPa). Bigger frames were also implemented to support the boiler and deal with frame cracking issues. Nos. 662 and 663 would be the first locomotives in the class built to these specifications in 1881.

No. 664 was built with a plain, solid splasher design in 1881. It also had a dummy rear sandbox that spanned across the cab to the splasher. These features became standard for all locomotives, though older locomotives would instead have their splasher slots plated up.

The automatic vacuum brake became the new GNR standard brake gear in 1884, which saw the exhaust pipes moving inside the boiler. No. 772 would be the first of the class to be built with this brake, and older examples were gradually converted from Smith's non-automatic brake.

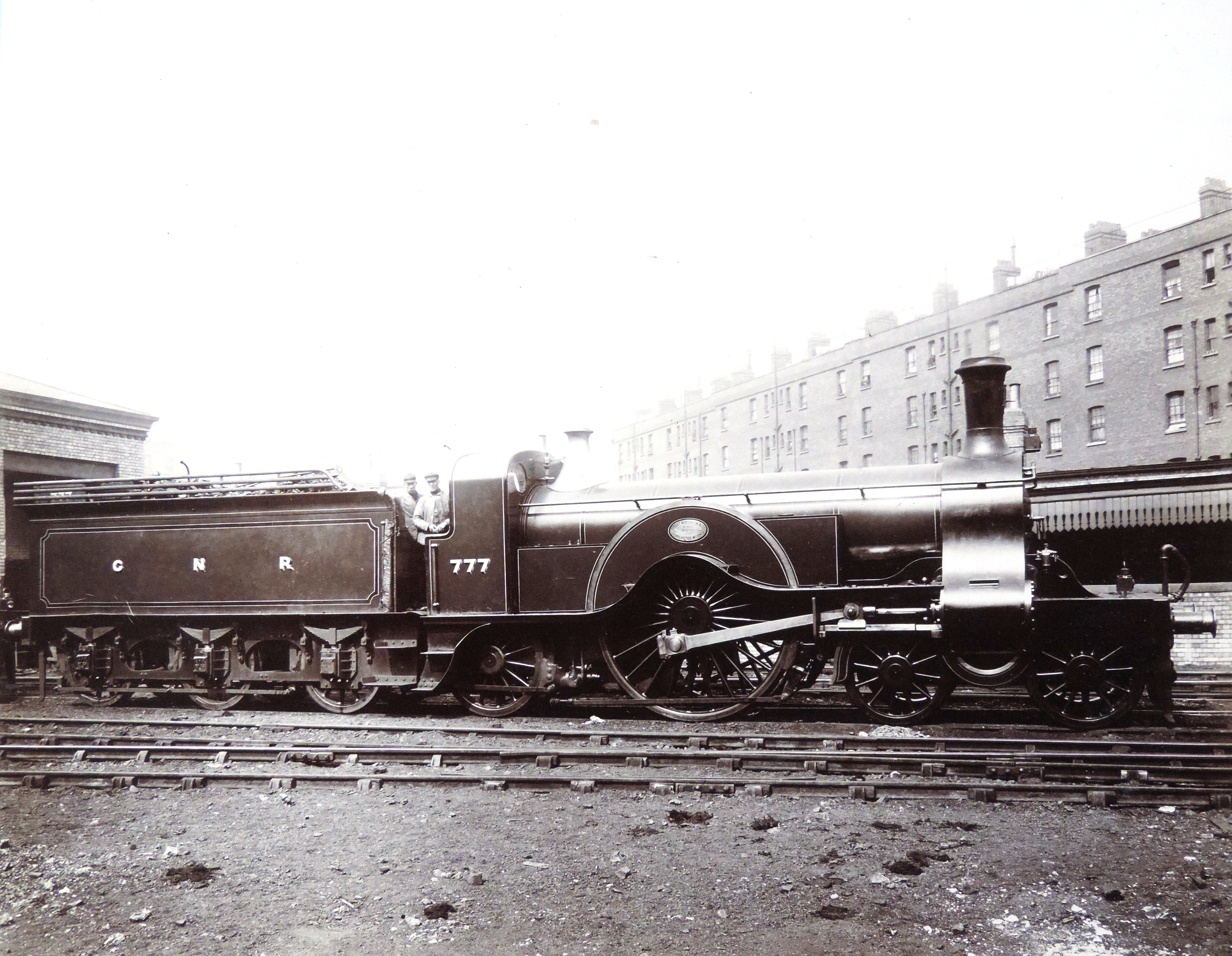
No. 777, featuring thicker steel wheel tyres and a solid splasher

No. 775 was built with thicker steel wheel tyres in 1887, which would become standard for the class. This increased their driving wheel diameter by 0.5 in (13 mm) and raised the boiler pitch by 0.25 in (6.4 mm). Older locomotives were upgraded when their older ones wore out. The new tyres, along with heavier steel rails across the network and improved lubrication with new rolling stock, meant less rolling resistance with heavier trains at the cost of a reduced factor of adhesion.

Between 1882 and 1891, the 1870 Series locomotives were progressively rebuilt to match the 1880 Series.

=== 1894 Series ===
By 1890, the Stirling Singles were being pushed to their limits. Train loads had been steadily growing each year, and the GNR was transitioning to bogie passenger stock. As Locomotive Superintendent, Stirling refused to permit double heading for the longest time, pursuing a "one engine-one train" policy instead. Consequently, Stirling's locomotives were beginning to lose their punctual reputation, and a Single hauling over 200 tons without issue required good weather and experienced drivers.

Nevertheless, Stirling was adamant that he could improve his Singles to handle increasing train loads without double heading. Work began on designing and constructing an enlarged Single, but the new locomotives would not be ready in time for the 1894 summer timetable, forcing Stirling to allow double heading and standardise front brake pipes on all GNR locomotives.

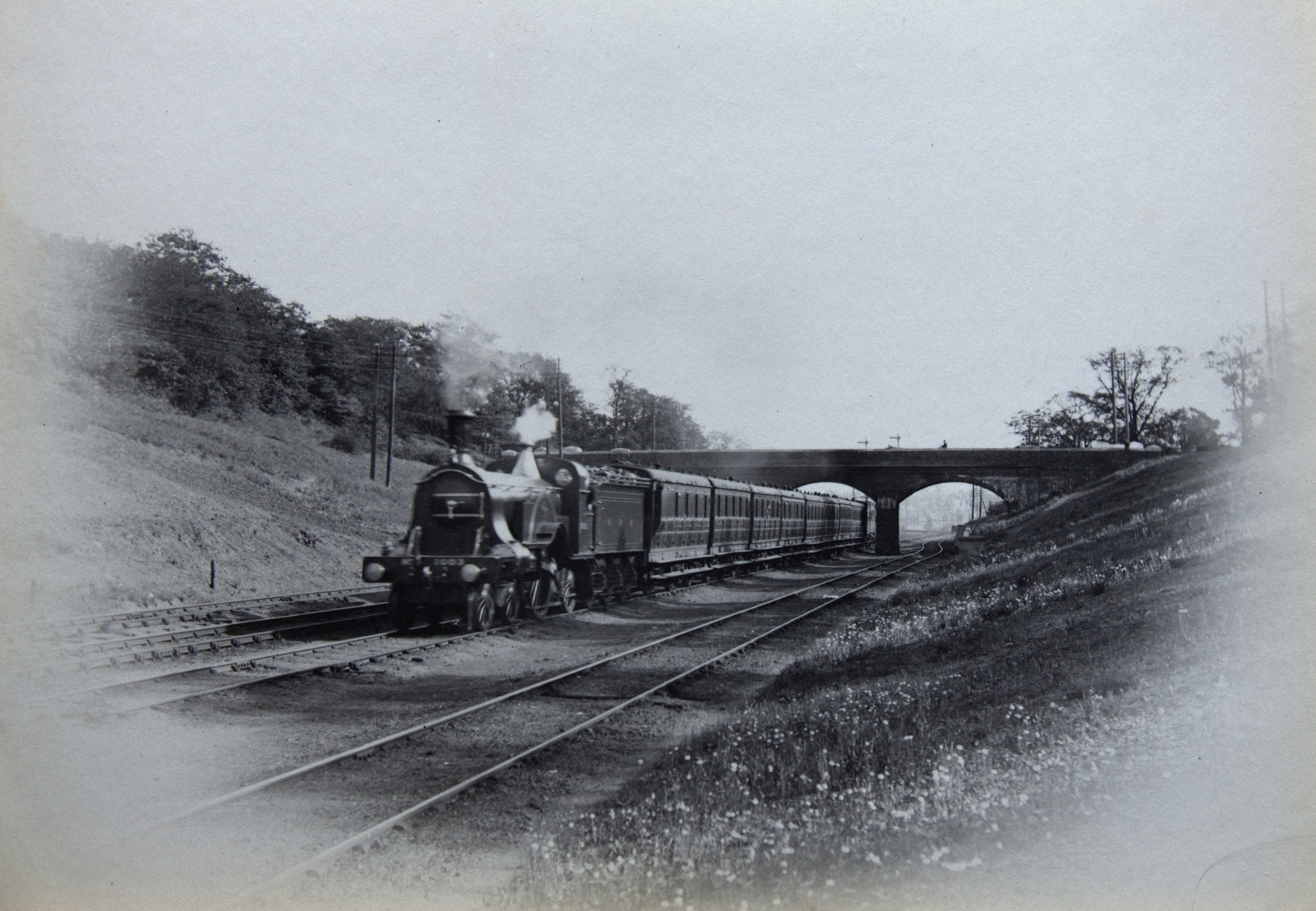
No. 1003

No. 1003 was the first member of the new batch on 19 November 1894, and Nos. 1004-1008 were progressively completed through 1895. These engines had wider 19.5 in × 28 in (495 mm × 711 mm) cylinders, though No. 1008's were 19 in × 28 in (483 mm × 711 mm) as a temporary experiment. The wheelbase between the driving and trailing wheels was elongated and boiler shortened to accommodate a bigger firebox. The boiler itself was pitched higher and working pressure increased to 170 psi (1,200 kPa). However, the most notable improvement was a new cab shape with an overhanging roof; "the side sheet of the cab had an 8in. cut-away at waist level, curving upwards and rearwards, leaving the cab roof at the original length proposed." These modifications were exclusive to the 1003 Series, and no older examples were upgraded as such.

Following two accidents in 1895 and 1896 with members of this batch, Henry Ivatt (who had recently become Locomotive Engineer in 1895) reduced all the Stirling Singles' adhesion weights. With the 1003 Series, this also included a drop in boiler pressure to 160 psi (1,100 kPa).

=== Ivatt Rebuilds ===
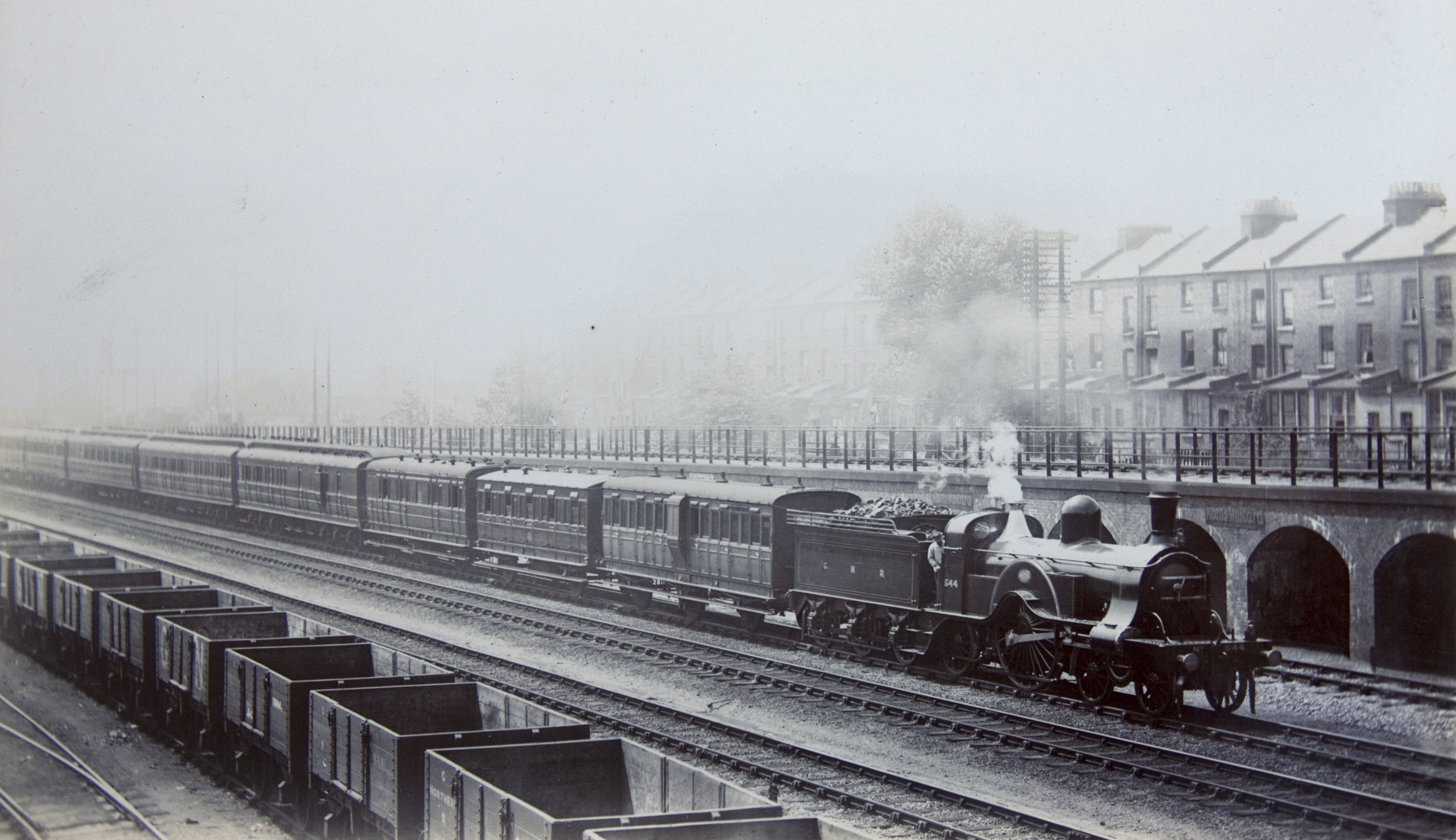
No. 544 with a domed boiler

One of the first things Ivatt did after becoming Locomotive Engineer was attempting to design a new boiler for the Singles with a dome and larger firebox grate. Eight boilers were built, and being experimental, each was quite different. Each boiler was fitted to Nos. 93, 776, 544, 95, 34, 22, 221, and 1007 from 1896 to 1907, when each engine entered the works for overhaul. Ivatt also used these engines to experiment with various other features, such as different cab shapes, cab layouts, and safety valves.

More conventionally, Ivatt also built nine 4 ft 2 in (1.270 m) "quasi-Stirling" boilers. They were essentially identical to Stirling's original 1880 Series boiler design, except modernised with washout plugs and an upgraded boiler pressure of 170 psi (1,200 kPa). No. 1 received one of these boilers in 1925 and has carried it since.

As the Stirling smokebox doors wore out, some locomotives received Ivatt doors instead.

No. 548 became the vessel for Ivatt's various spark arrester experiments. Beginning in March 1901, its smokebox was extended so it could receive her first "G.W.R. pattern" spark arrester. No improvements were shown, and a Dugald Drummond-patented arrester took its place in November 1901, but this worsened performance and was removed about a month later. No. 548 would be left alone for another year before the GWR arrester was reinstalled. Despite being ineffective and even causing steaming issues, No. 548 would carry this to withdrawal.

== Classification and numbering ==
For a long time, the GNR never used any official classification. The Stirling Singles in particular were called Bogie Singles, Bogie Express Locomotives, 8 ft Singles, 8-foot Types, 8-footers, 4-2-2 Singles, and many other names. However, there does not seem to be an official method used to distinguish each design from the other pre-1900.

In 1900, Ivatt introduced an official classification scheme to the GNR, which classified the 1894 Series as class A1, the 1880 Series class A2, and domed locomotives class A3. By this point, all the 1870 Series locomotives had been rebuilt as 1880 Series locomotives.

In 1910, George Frederick Bird published The Locomotives of the Great Northern Railway 1847–1910. Here, Nos. 1-671 (1870-1883) were designated G, Nos. 771-1002 (1884-1893) G2, and Nos. 1003-1008 (1894-1895) G3. Although it does not seem like this was officially used by the GNR, Bird’s system was most likely based on the labels of the drawers that Doncaster Works kept their drawings for each GNR engine in. His classification has been used in other sources, but it does not appear to have been used officially by the GNR. A major flaw in Bird’s work is that he classified Nos. 662-671 as G, claiming they were the same design as the original 1870 Series with 4 ft 0.5 in (1.232 m) boilers. However, Nos. 662-671 were actually the first locomotives to be built with the 1880 Series' bigger 4 ft 2 in (1.270 m) boiler and should be given the G2 classification. Whether this is a mistake on Bird’s part or Doncaster Works’ is unknown.

The Great Northern Railway Society sorted each of the Stirling Single designs on their website by their respective number series. The 1870 Series is labelled the No. 1 Series, the 1880 Series the 662 Series, and the 1894 Series the 1003 Class.

The GNR did not number its locomotives sequentially, instead using numbers freed up by withdrawing older locomotives. Thus the 1870 series was numbered GNR Nos. 1, 8, 33, 2, 3, 5, 7, 22, 48, 34, 47, 53, 62, 221, 94, 69, 98, 544-549, 60, 550, 93, 95; the 1880 series 662-671, 771-778, and 1001-2; and 1894 series 1003-8.

== Performance ==
These locomotives were able to haul 275-long-ton (279 t; 308-short-ton) trains at an average of 50 miles per hour (80 km/h), with a top speed on lighter trains of 85 miles per hour (137 km/h). When taking part in the 1895 Race to the North, GNR Stirling No. 775 made the 82 miles (132 km) from Grantham to York in 1 hour 16 minutes. This translates to an average speed of 64.7 mph (104.1 km/h).

Members of the 1894 series were originally built weighing 49.55 long tons (50.35 t) but following two high-speed derailments in 1895/6 the weight was reduced by 1% to 48.755 long tons (49.537 t; 54.606 short tons).

== Accidents and incidents ==
- On 21 January 1876, rebuilt Sturrock 2-2-2 No. 269 hauling the southbound Special Scotch Express rear-ended a coal train at Abbots Ripton after a signal, weighed down by snow, failed to warn that the line was blocked. Another express hauled by Stirling 4-2-2 No. 48, travelling in the opposite direction, soon collided with the wreckage. 13 people were killed.
- On 23 December 1876, a Nottingham-bound express train hauled by locomotive No. 8 overshot signals at danger due to slippery rails from the weather and a long descent after Potters Bar, Hertfordshire, causing it to collide with goods wagons during a shunting manoeuvre at Arlesey, Bedfordshire. Five people were killed.
- On 10 November 1895, an overnight Scottish express hauled by locomotive No. 1006 derailed at St Neots when it encountered a broken rail. One person was killed. The accident report by Her Majesty's Railway Inspectorate commented on the abnormally heavy axle loading of the locomotive, which was nearly 20 tons on the driving axle.
- On 7 March 1896, a passenger train hauled by locomotive No. 1003 was derailed at Little Bytham, Lincolnshire, due to the premature removal of a speed restriction after track renewal. Two people were killed.

== Withdrawal and preservation ==
With the arrival of the Ivatt Atlantics after 1898, the class started being displaced from the most prestigious express services, and withdrawals of the 1870 series began in 1899. The last examples of the class were in use on secondary services until 1916.

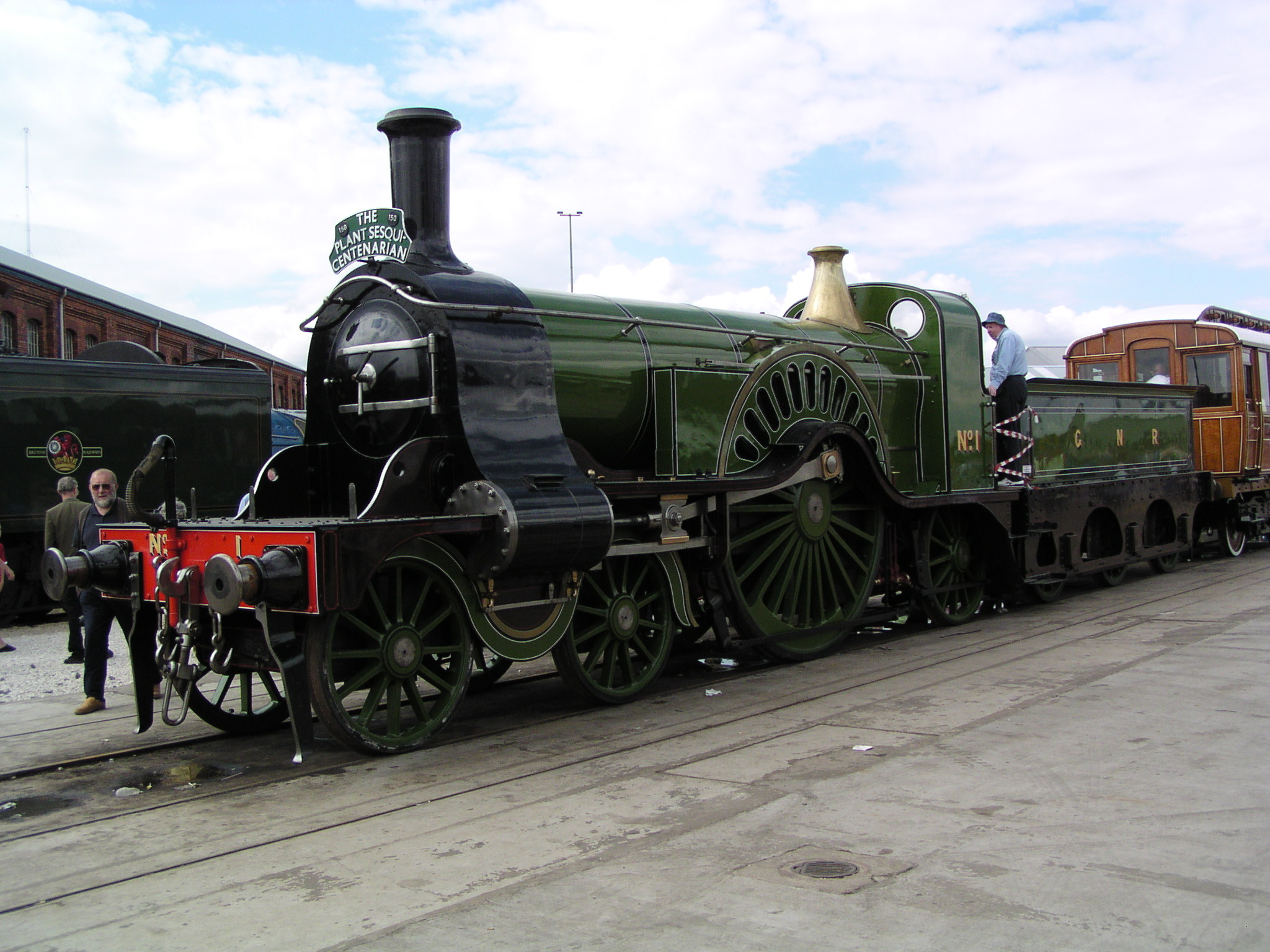
Preserved No. 1 in 2003

The first of the class, No. 1, is the only engine to be preserved. It was withdrawn in 1907 and partially dismantled, but a decision was made to restore it for exhibition in 1909. While attempts were made to cosmetically restore it as closely as possible to its original 1870 condition—re-opening the splasher slots, removing the dummy rear sandbox, etc.—the larger boiler and frames expose No. 1 as still being in its rebuilt 1880s Series form. A hybrid Stirling tender from Doncaster carriage shunter Hawthorn 0-4-2 No. 112A was attached to the locomotive. Although inauthentic, as no Stirling Single ever carried this kitbash of a tender, it served its role as a substitute for the original 1870 small tender. In this new form, No. 1 would make various exhibition and photoshoot cameos around London and its home base, King's Cross Top Shed.

No. 1 was restored to running order in 1925 for the Stockton and Darlington Railway Centenary celebrations at Faverdale, Darlington, in July 1925. No. 1 would steam again for the fiftieth anniversary of the Race to the North, running railtours all around the country from 1938 to 1939. When it was not in steam, No. 1 would be stored at the LNER Railway Museum in York, which was then replaced by the National Railway Museum in 1975. No. 1's final session running in steam would be during the 1980s, visiting the Great Central Railway and the North Yorkshire Moors Railway.

The locomotive remains in good mechanical condition, though it has not steamed since 1985. It was used recently to act as a centrepiece in York Theatre Royal's performance of The Railway Children play, in which it was seen to move into a stage set of a period station, created initially at the National Railway Museum in 2008-9, and then in the redundant Waterloo International railway station in 2010-11. For the later Toronto and Kings Cross performances, LSWR T3 class No. 563 was used instead. No. 1 appeared to be in steam for its 'performances' but was not, using fog machine-generated smoke to mimic escaping steam while being shunted during the performance using a British Rail Class 08 shunter that was hidden from the main stage.

Preserved No. 1 with large Stirling No. 1002 tender

Front of preserved No. 1

In the late 2000s, an original 3500-gallon Stirling tender belonging to No. 1002 was found near Peterborough, being used as a sludge carrier. It was moved to York by 2009 and was restored in 2014. Traded for the old Stirling hybrid tender, which is now stored at Locomotion, Shildon, No. 1 has since carried No. 1002's restored tender.

Today, No. 1 is exhibited at the National Railway Museum, York.

== Modelling ==
An 18-inch minimum gauge model of No. 1 was built in 1898, at the Regent Street Polytechnic, from a set of parts supplied by W. G. Bagnall. Amongst the students at Regent Street who worked on the model was Henry Greenly who later became a celebrated miniature locomotive builder and supplied locomotives for the Romney, Hythe and Dymchurch Railway. The locomotive was initially sold to Mr. E.F.S. Notter, the Great Northern Railway District Locomotive Superintendent at Kings Cross, who between 1910 and 1914 operated it at Alexander Park (London) and later kept it in King Cross 'Top Shed', the home of the full size Stirling Singles. In 1926 this locomotive was bought by the Fairbourne Miniature Railway and in 1936 it was sold to the Jaywick Miniature Railway, which ran it until 1939. It then passed through the hands of a number of private owners until it was bought by the World of Country Life Museum at Sandy Bay, Exmouth, Devon, in 1986.

Bagnall had earlier in 1893 supplied a similar model (works number 1425) to Lord Downshire of Easthampstead Park, Crowthorne Berkshire. This engine was later preserved by Mr Hoare in the Boys Reading Room at the Training Ship Mercury at Hamble. It was subsequently sold to a private owner in Southampton in 1946. Its current whereabouts is unknown.

Nuremberg toymaker Georges Carette's range included a 2.5 inch-gauge model of Stirling Single 776, in around 1900. It was marketed in the UK by Bassett-Lowke, appearing in their 1904 catalogue.

An unpowered 5-inch gauge model of a Stirling Single locomotive, engineered by Dennis Hefford, is on display at the entrance to Arch Two of Brighton Toy and Model Museum.

A 1/12 scale model of No. 93, built by 'R Jackson' around 1888, is displayed at Worthing Museum and Art Gallery.

Kitmaster produced an injection moulded plastic kit of the Stirling Single in the 1950s. David Boyle, founder of Dapol Model Railways, recalls seeing the moulds being destroyed in the early 1980s, leading him to purchase the tooling for and reissue the remaining Kitmaster kits.

Aster Hobby introduced Gauge1 live steam model in 1996.

In April 2015, Rapido Trains inc. announced a model of No.1 which was subsequently delivered in 2018, exclusive to the Locomotion Models Range. A later release, this time under Rapido Trains UK, covers the hybrid tender the locomotive carried until 2014

== In fiction ==
- Emily from Thomas & Friends is based on this class.
