= GNR Class J4 =

Class of British steam locomotives (1882–1901)

GNR J4 & J5 Classes LNER Classes J3 and J4
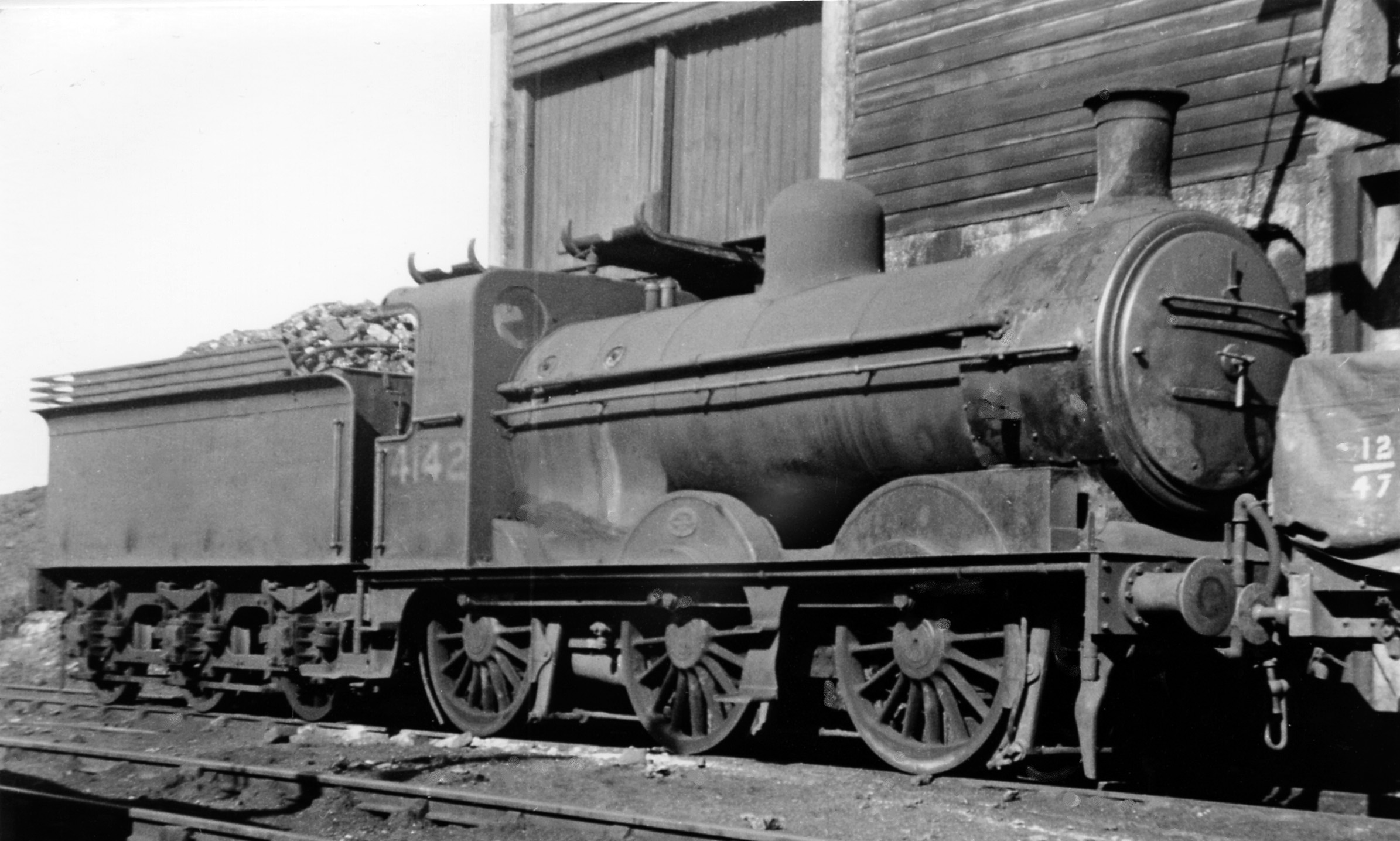
- LNER J3 No. 4142. at Immingham Locomotive Depot 1947
Type and origin
- Power type: Steam
- Designer: Patrick Stirling, rebuilt Henry Ivatt
- Builder: Doncaster Works (297); Dübs and Company (25)
- Build date: 1882-1901
- Total produced: 322; 153 rebuilt to J3 class 12 built for the Midland and Great Northern Joint Railway
Specifications
- Configuration
  - Whyte: 0-6-0
- Gauge: 4 ft 8 1/2 in (1,435 mm) standard gauge
- Driver dia.: 5 ft 2 in (1.57 m)
- Loco weight: 41 tons 10 cwt (42 tons 12 cwt rebuilds)
- Fuel type: coal
- Boiler pressure: J4: 170 psi (1.2 MPa); J3: 175 psi (1.21 MPa)
- Cylinders: two inside
- Cylinder size: 17.5 in × 26 in (440 mm × 660 mm)
Performance figures
- Tractive effort: J4: 18,558 lbf (82.55 kN); J3: 19,104 lbf (84.98 kN)
Career
- Withdrawn: 1926 - 1954 (J4s); 1903 - 1951 (J5s)
- Disposition: All scrapped

The Great Northern Railway J4 Class was a class of 322 0-6-0 steam locomotives, introduced in 1882 designed by Patrick Stirling for goods traffic. Just over half of these were rebuilt by Nigel Gresley to a design by Henry Ivatt between 1912 and 1929.

== GNR Class J5/LNER Class J4 ==
The GNR Class J5 was based on the GNR Class J7 0-6-0 tender engines designed by Patrick Stirling, thirty-five of which were built at Doncaster between 1867 and 1873, these had cylinders of 24 in (610 mm) stroke and domeless boilers of 4 ft 0 1/2 in (1.232 m) diameter.

In 1873, Stirling decided to make a new design, later known as GNR Class J6, based on the J7s but with the cylinder stroke increased to 26 in (660 mm). Between 1873 and 1879, 28 of these were built, after which the boiler was enlarged to 4 ft 2 1/2 in (1.283 m) diameter, and 132 more were built down to 1896. That year, Stirling introduced the GNR Class J5, with the boiler diameter increased to 4 ft 5 in (1.35 m) but still domeless, and ten were built. After Stirling's death, Ivatt amended this design to use a domed boiler of the same size and produced a further 145 between 1897 and 1901, of which twelve were supplied to the Midland and Great Northern Joint Railway (M&GN) in 1900 as their Class D^{A}.

As older locomotives became due for boiler renewals, they were normally given the latest type; in this way, 145 of the 160 J6s were rebuilt to GNR Class J5; similarly, 153 of the J5s (including some former J6s) were rebuilt to GNR Class J4.

=== Numbering ===
The GNR Class J6 and J5 locomotives were given numbers 101/2, 133/5, 141/3/7, 150/4, 160/3/5/8, 170/1/3/5–83/7, 191–6/8/9, 300–4/6–310/2–324, 327–332/4/6–354, 359–365/7/8, 370–3/5/8/9/81–94/6/8/9, 640–51, 716–50, 791–800, 831–50, 1011/2, 1031–45, 1081–1173. Those numbered below 400 took the numbers of older locomotives that had been withdrawn. The twelve M&GN locomotives were numbered 81–92.

== GNR Class J4/LNER Class J3 ==
In 1912, Gresley produced a new boiler with a 4-foot 8-inch diameter and a total firebox area of 105 square feet. This was designed to be used on the D2 Class 4-4-0s and the J5s. The first member to be rebuilt was No. 1163 in May, being reclassified as J4. The GNR rebuilt 70 more to this specification. Upon the Groupings of 1923, the class became the LNER J3s. The LNER also rebuilt 82 locomotives, with the last rebuild occurring in 1929. By this point, there were only 157 J4s left in service. From 1926 onwards, the J3s were refitted with Ross pop safety valves, as was standard on the LNER. In service, the J3s handled the same duties as the J4s. However, they could also be found on Sunday school excursions from London to Southend-on-Sea, as well as many other excursions.

== ROD Service ==
Twenty-six J5s were loaned to the ROD during the First World War, being sent to France alongside many other locomotives from other companies. Before going to France, the J4s were given boiler feed pumps and condensing gear. However, this was removed upon their return in 1919.

== Preservation ==
None of the J4s survived into preservation.

== Sources ==
- Ian Allan ABC of British Railways Locomotives (1948 ed.). part 4, page 28.
