= GNR Class C1 =

GNR Class C1 may refer to either of the following classes of railway locomotive designed for the Great Northern Railway by Henry Ivatt:

- GNR Class C1 (large boiler), 94 locomotives introduced from 1902, later LNER Class C1
- GNR Class C1 (small boiler), 22 locomotives introduced from 1898, later LNER Class C2

== See also ==
- GNR Class C2, later LNER Class C12
