= L&YR Class 7 =

British express passenger steam locomotive

Lancashire & Yorkshire Railway class 7
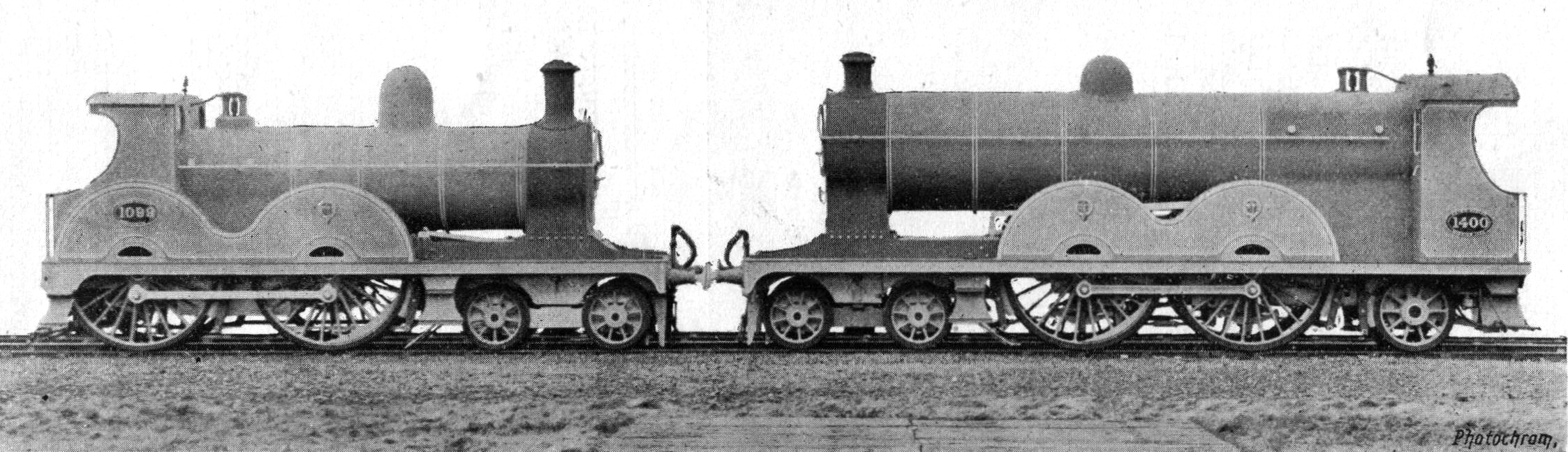
- No. 1400 (right) with L&YR No.1099 (class 3) (left)
Type and origin
- Power type: Steam
- Designer: John Aspinall
- Build date: 1899–1902
- Total produced: 40
Specifications
- Configuration
  - Whyte: 4-4-2
  - UIC: 2'B1'
- Gauge: 4 ft 8 1/2 in (1,435 mm)
- Driver dia.: 7 ft 3 in (2.210 m)
- Loco weight: 58.75 long tons (59.69 t)
- Boiler pressure: 180 psi (1.24 MPa)
- Cylinders: Two
- Cylinder size: 19 in × 26 in (483 mm × 660 mm)
- Valve gear: Joy
Performance figures
- Tractive effort: 16,506 lbf (73.4 kN)
Career
- Operators: L&YR, LMS
- Class: L&YR: 7
- Power class: LMS: 2P
- Numbers: LMS: 10300–10339
- Withdrawn: 1926–1934
- Disposition: All scrapped

The Lancashire and Yorkshire Railway (L&YR) Class 7 was a class of Atlantic passenger steam locomotives to the design of John Aspinall. Forty were built between 1899 and 1902. They were known as "High-Flyers" as a result of having a high-pitched boiler that was supposed to increase stability at speed. All passed into London, Midland and Scottish Railway (LMS) ownership on the grouping of 1923, becoming the LMS's only Atlantic tender engine class. The LMS gave them the power classification 2P. Withdrawals started in 1926, and all were scrapped by 1934.

These were free-running engines capable of high speeds. It was claimed that No. 1392 attained a speed of over 100 mph (160 km/h) on 15 July 1899 during a trial run with five bogie coaches on the Liverpool Exchange to Southport line. Less credence is given to an alleged 117 mph (188 km/h) by No. 1417 near Kirkby on the route from Liverpool Exchange to Manchester Victoria.

== Design ==
Aspinall and Henry Ivatt, now at the Great Northern Railway (GNR) and a former colleague from Inchicore, were by 1897 discussing their needs for larger engines that their railways existing 4-4-0 and 4-2-2 locomotives. Comparing notes they both selected the 4-4-2 arrangement as able to accommodate a larger boiler while giving options to easily alter the design of the firebox if necessary. (Note: Aspinall would also been aware of the Atlantic Coast Line 4-4-2s introduced in the United states in the mid-1890s.) Ivatt, whose need was more urgent, introduced his class C1 in June 1898 which did not incorporate a large boiler. Aspinall viewed Ivatt's locomotive and made some minor improvements to the Class 7 cab such as fitting seats. When the Aspinall engine appeared in 1899 it leveraged the capability of the 4-4-2 to hold a larger boiler. The length of the boiler increasing from 10 feet 7 3/4 inches (3.245 m) in his previous 4-4-0 design while the heating area increased from 1,108 square feet (102.9 m^{2}) to 1,877 square feet (174.4 m^{2}).

== Numbering ==
The locomotives were built in two batches of 20 at Horwich Works. The first batch, turned out in 1899, were numbered 1400, 1392–9, 1401–4, 700, 702, 708, 711, 718, 735, 737; the second batch of 1902 were numbered 1405–24. Those numbered in the 700s took the numbers of older locomotives which had been withdrawn; the others were given numbers at the end of the L&YR list which were as yet unused. Under the LMS, they were allocated the numbers 10300–39 in order of construction, but several were withdrawn before these numbers could be applied.

== Details ==
No. 737, the last locomotive of the first batch, is believed by John Marshall to have been the first British superheated locomotive. The front tubeplate of the boiler was recessed, creating a cylindrical space into which the superheater was mounted. This consisted of a drum 3 ft 6 in (1,067 mm) long through which were a number of tubes for the hot gases to pass through. It offered only a low degree of superheat – 95 °F (53 °C) above the normal steam temperature. The last five locomotives of the 1902 batch - Nos. 1420–4 - were given the same apparatus when new, but it was removed from all six by 1917.
