= 4-4-2 (locomotive) =

Railway locomotive wheel arrangement

4-4-2 (Atlantic)
- Front of locomotive at left

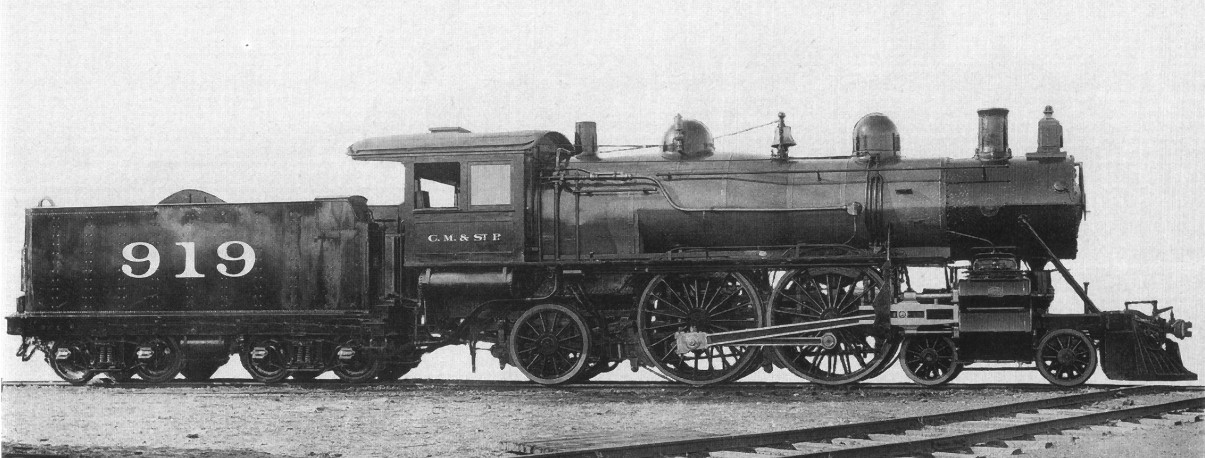
- Milwaukee Road class A2 no. 919, built 1901
Equivalent classifications
- UIC class: 2'B1
- French class: 221
- Turkish class: 25
- Swiss class: 2/5
- Russian class: 2-2-1
First known tank engine version
- First use: 1880
- Country: United Kingdom
- Locomotive: LT&SR 1 Class
- Railway: London, Tilbury and Southend Railway
- Designer: William Adams
- Builder: Sharp, Stewart & Co. & Nasmyth, Wilson & Co.
- Evolved from: 4-4-0T
First known tender engine version
- First use: 1888
- Country: United States of America
- Locomotive: Experimental double-firebox
- Designer: George Strong
- Builder: Hinkley Locomotive Works
- Evolved from: 2-4-2
- Benefits: More stable than 2-4-2, Wide & deep firebox
First known "True type" version
- First use: 1894
- Country: United States
- Locomotive: Atlantic Coast Line 4-4-2
- Railway: Atlantic Coast Line Railroad
- Designer: Baldwin Locomotive Works
- Builder: Baldwin Locomotive Works
- Evolved from: 4-4-0
- Benefits: Larger, wider firebox

Under the Whyte notation for the classification of steam locomotives by wheel arrangement, 4-4-2 represents a configuration of a four-wheeled leading bogie, four powered and coupled driving wheels, and two trailing wheels supporting part of the weight of the boiler and firebox. This allows a larger firebox and boiler than the 4-4-0 configuration.

This wheel arrangement is commonly known as the Atlantic type, although it is also sometimes called a Milwaukee or 4-4-2 Milwaukee, after the Milwaukee Road, which employed it in high speed passenger service.

== Overview ==
While the wheel arrangement and type name Atlantic would come to fame in the fast passenger service competition between railroads in the United States by mid-1895, the tank locomotive version of the 4-4-2 Atlantic type first made its appearance in the United Kingdom in 1880, when William Adams designed the 1 Class 4-4-2T of the London, Tilbury and Southend Railway (LT&SR).

The 4-4-2T is the tank locomotive equivalent of a 4-4-0 American type tender locomotive, but with the frame extended to allow for a fuel bunker behind the cab. This necessitated the addition of a trailing truck to support the additional weight at the rear end of the locomotive. As such, the tank version of the 4-4-2 wheel arrangement appeared earlier than the tender version.

The tender version of the 4-4-2 originated in the United States of America, evolving from the less stable 2-4-2 Columbia type wheel arrangement, and was built especially for mainline passenger express services. One advantage of the type over its predecessor 4-4-0 American type was that the trailing wheels allowed a larger and deeper firebox to be placed behind the driving wheels.

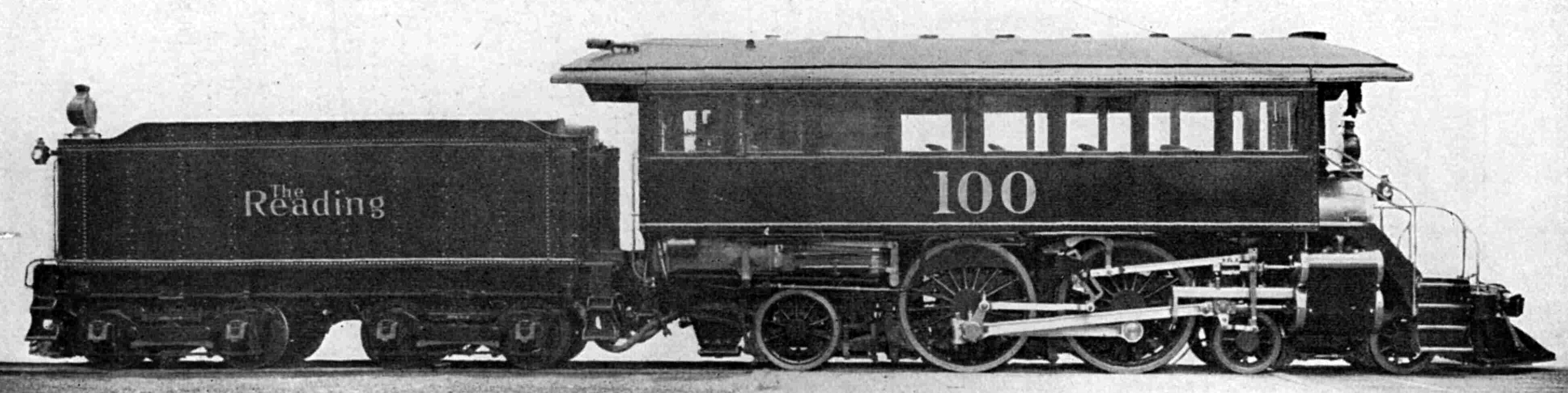
A 4-4-2 inspection locomotive of the Philadelphia and Reading Railroad

The first use of the 4-4-2 wheel arrangement for a tender locomotive was under an experimental double-firebox locomotive, built to the design of George Strong at the Hinkley Locomotive Works in 1888. The locomotive was not successful and was scrapped soon afterwards. The wheel arrangement was named after the second North American 4-4-2 tender locomotive class, built by the Baldwin Locomotive Works in 1894 for use on the Atlantic Coast Line of the Philadelphia and Reading Railway.

Baldwin's ideas on 4-4-2 tender locomotives were soon copied in the United Kingdom, initially by Henry Ivatt of the Great Northern Railway (GNR) with his GNR Class C1 Klondyke Atlantic of 1898. These were quickly followed by John Aspinall's Class 7, known as the High-Flyer, for the Lancashire and Yorkshire Railway (L&YR).

== Usage ==
=== Austria-Hungary ===
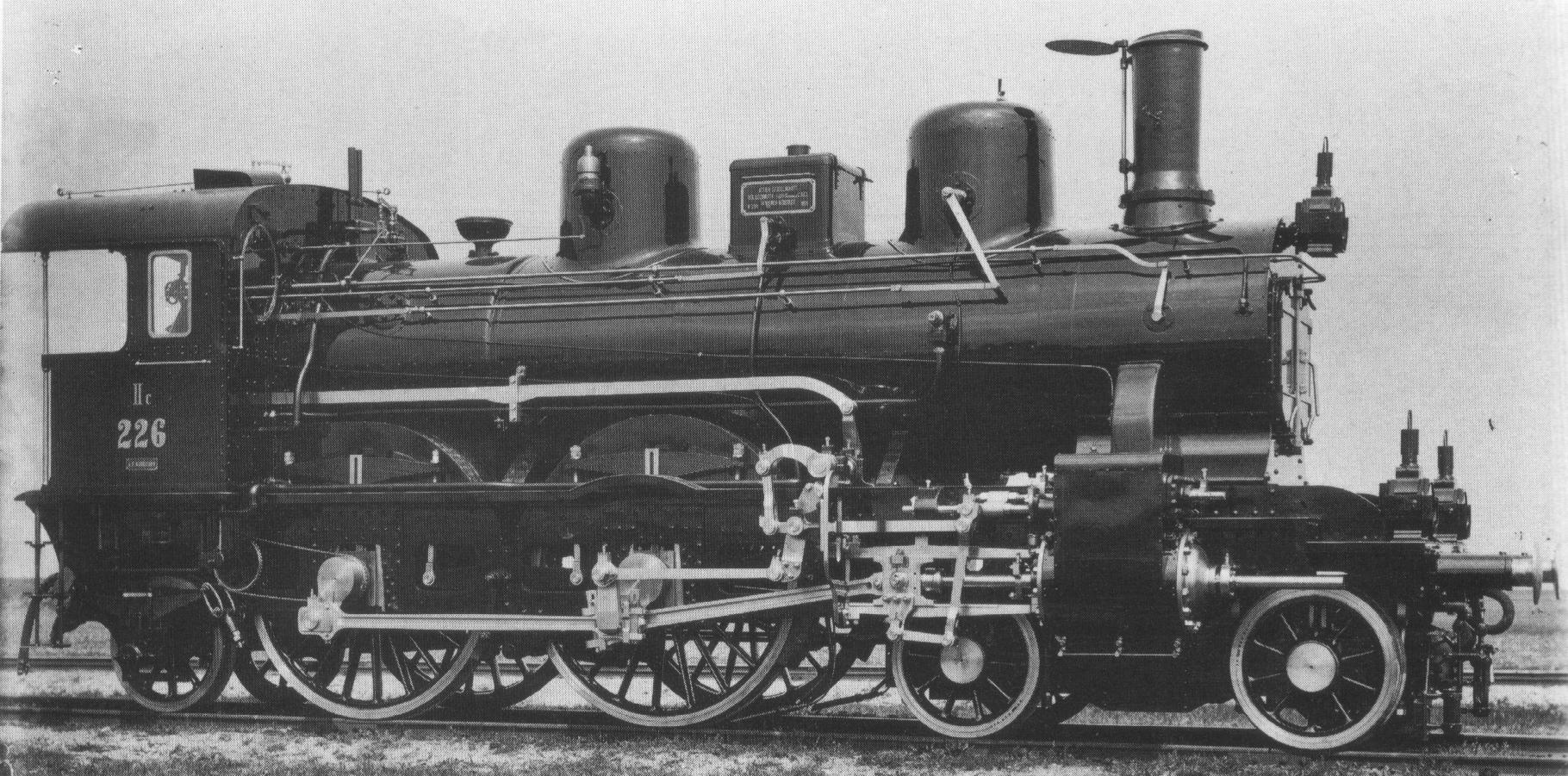
The KFNB IId Class

The first European Atlantic locomotive type was the Austro-Hungarian IId class of the Kaiser Ferdinands-Nordbahn (KFNB). It was built from 1895 and later became the 308 class on the Imperial Royal State Railways (kaiserlich und königlich Staatsbahnen, kkStB).

It was followed from 1901 by the XVIb class of the Austrian Northwestern Railway (Österreichische Nordwestbahn, ÖNWB) that later became the kkStB class 208, and then by the kkStB 108 class. They were not numerous, though. All three classes together numbered a little more than one hundred locomotives.

Apart from the Austrian locomotives, the Hungarian State Railways (Magyar Államvasutak or MÁV) also operated some Atlantic classes.

=== Belgium ===
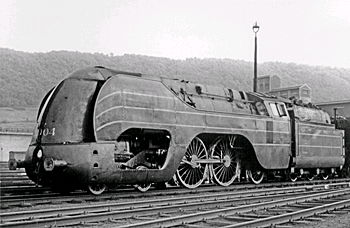
NMBS/SNCB Class 12 No. 12004, c. 1940

In 1939, the National Railway Company of Belgium (NMBS/SNCB) introduced six Class 12 streamlined Atlantic locomotives on the fast lightweight boat trains that ran on the 124 kilometres (77 miles) line between Brussels and Ostend. Designed by Raoul Notesse to be capable of speeds of 120 to 140 kilometres per hour (75 to 87 miles per hour) and based on the successful Canadian Pacific Railway 4-4-4 Jubilee type semi-streamlined locomotives, but incorporating the ideas on streamlining of André Huet, they were built by John Cockerill at Seraing. They were fully streamlined, except for openings to provide access to the valve gear and motion, and had inside cylinders with outside valve gear to reduce oscillation at speed. The class remained in service until 1962.

=== Germany ===
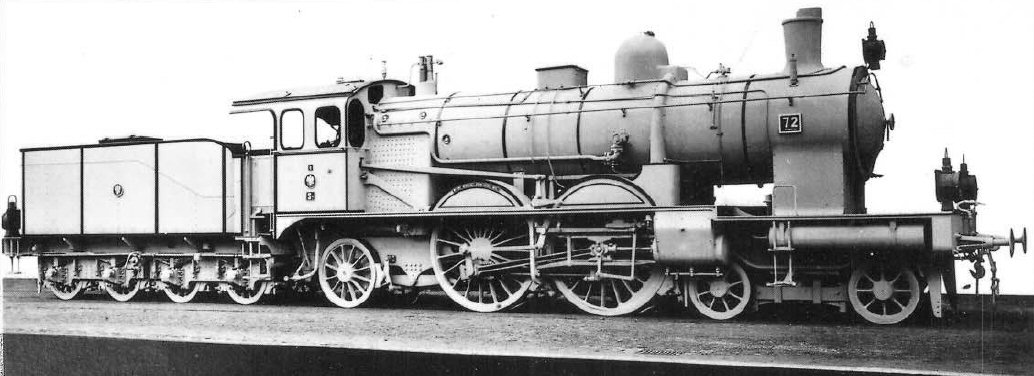
Prussian S 7 Class

The Atlantic, known in Germany as the 2'B1' wheel arrangement, enjoyed some short-lived popularity in the German states. Between 1902 and 1906, the S 7 class of the Prussian state railways was built to two competing designs, 159 locomotives to the design of August von Borries and 79 locomotives to that of Alfred de Glehn. Between 1908 and 1910, Hanomag built 99 Prussian S 9 locomotives. All were four-cylinder compound engines working on saturated steam. The Prussian Atlantics were withdrawn shortly after the First World War and some were given to France, Belgium and Poland.

Atlantics were also adopted in some other German states.

- Twelve Pfalz P3.1 class locomotives were built for the Palatinate Railway (Pfalzbahn) from 1898. In addition, eleven Pfalz P4 class locomotives were built from 1905.
- Fifteen Saxon X V class locomotives were built for the Royal Saxon State Railways from 1902.
- Eighteen Baden IId class locomotives were built for the Grand Duchy of Baden State Railways from 1902.
- In 1900, the Royal Bavarian State Railways imported two 4-4-2 locomotives from Baldwin Locomotive Works in the United States of America and classified them Bavarian S 2/5. Ten more locomotives were built by Maffei in 1904.

=== India ===
In India, the broad gauge E class was rebuilt in the 1940s and survived into the 1970s.

=== Japan ===
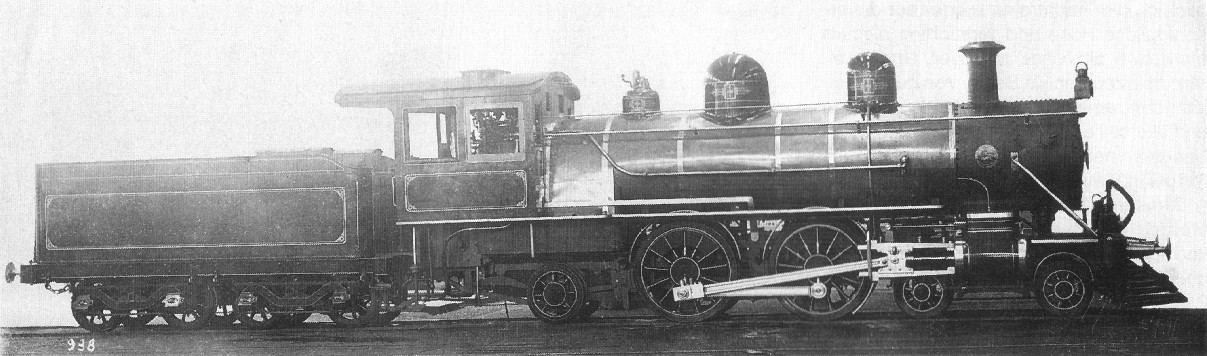
Japanese 6600 Class

In 1895 the then private 3 ft 6 in (1,067 mm) gauge Nippon Tetsudo (Japan Ry) sought, without success, to use low grade coal from the online Iwaki and Iryana mines in conventional narrow firebox loomotives. At that time the Baldwin Locomotive Works, in the United States of America, offered and guaranteed to build locomotives to burn successfully any fuel sent to them. For this case, Baldwin employed a wide firebox placed behind the drivers and over a trailing truck, building 24 4-4-2s and 20 2-8-2s to a single order in 1897 - recording that "They gave excellent satisfaction, and are wonderfully free steamers." Following nationalization, the Atlantics became Japanese Railways 6600 Class. Six more locomotives, built to the same design, were built for the Cape Government Railways in South Africa immediately following the completion of the Japanese order.

=== Mozambique ===
By the 1980s, the last Atlantics at work in the world were a few 3 ft 6 in (1,067 mm) Cape gauge examples in Mozambique. These survived reported retirements to operate into the beginning of the 21st century, becoming some of the last working steam in the country. Exceptionally, they had outlasted much larger and newer power, including Garratt locomotives.

=== Philippines ===
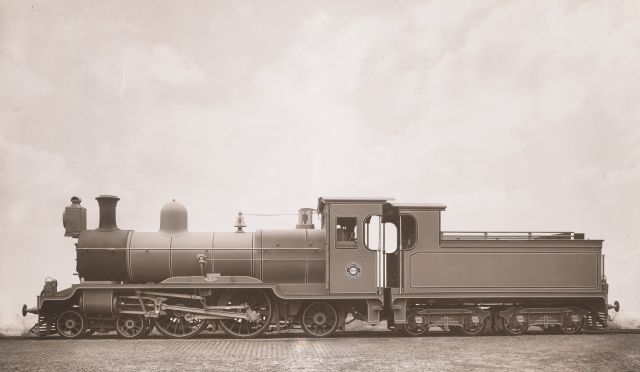
A Manila Railway 100 class locomotive.

The Manila Railway (ancestor to the Philippine National Railways) purchased five 100-class locomotives from the North British Locomotive Company in 1906. These were the first tender locomotives in Philippine service. In 1949, 7 American-built 4-8-2s were also numbered as the 100 class, presuming that the locomotives have been retired after World War II.

=== South Africa ===
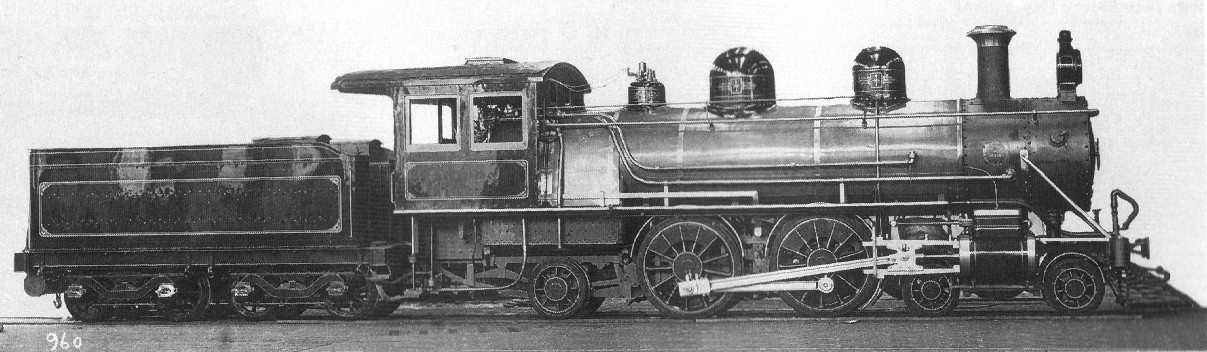
CGR 4th Class 4-4-2

In 1897, additional locomotives were urgently required by the Cape Government Railways (CGR) for the section south of Kimberley, at a time when locomotive production in England was being disrupted by strikes, while simultaneously the steamship companies had suddenly doubled all their freight rates to the Cape of Good Hope. As a result, six locomotives were ordered from Baldwin Locomotive Works. These were built in addition to a just fulfilled order for 24 Atlantics, designed and built for the then private 3 ft 6 in (1,067 mm) gauge Nippon Tetsudo, later nationalized into the Japanese Railways.

The locomotives were completed within sixty days of receipt of the order and, to circumvent the exorbitant freight charges of the steamship lines, were shipped to the Cape by sailing ship, with the result that the steamship companies promptly reverted to their old rates. Nicknamed the Hatracks, the locomotives were designated 4th Class on the CGR. When they came onto South African Railways (SAR) stock in 1912, they were considered obsolete and designated Class 04. They remained in SAR service until 1931.

=== United Kingdom ===
==== Tank locomotives ====
The 4-4-2T Atlantic was introduced into the United Kingdom in 1880 by William Adams, who designed the LT&SR 1 Class on behalf of Thomas Whitelegg of the London, Tilbury and Southend Railway (LT&SR). This was the first use of this wheel arrangement in the world. It was intended for heavy suburban trains around London and 36 locomotives were built by Sharp, Stewart and Company and Nasmyth, Wilson and Company between 1880 and 1892. Adams later developed the type into his successful suburban 415 class for the London and South Western Railway.

The LT&SR continued to build 4-4-2 tank locomotives after 1897, with the Class 37, Class 51 and Class 79. Henry Ivatt of the Great Northern Railway (GNR) also built sixty Class C2 tank locomotives between 1898 and 1907, for use on local and commuter trains in Yorkshire and North London.

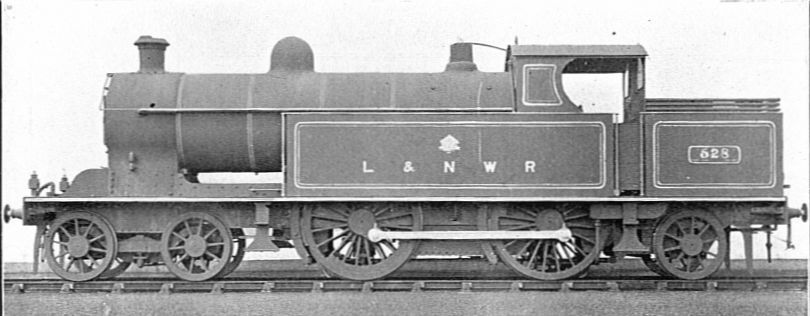
London and North Western Railway Precursor Tank Class

During the first decade of the twentieth century, the Atlantic tank locomotive became very popular in the United Kingdom.

- The Great Central Railway’s Class 9K and Class 9L were built between 1903 and 1907. They later became the LNER classes C13 and C14.
- The Great Western Railway’s 2221 Class was built between 1905 and 1912.
- The London and North Western Railway’s Precursor Tank Class was built between 1906 and 1909.
- Four classes were introduced by the London, Brighton and South Coast Railway, the I1 class, I2 class, I3 class and I4 class.

==== Tender locomotives ====
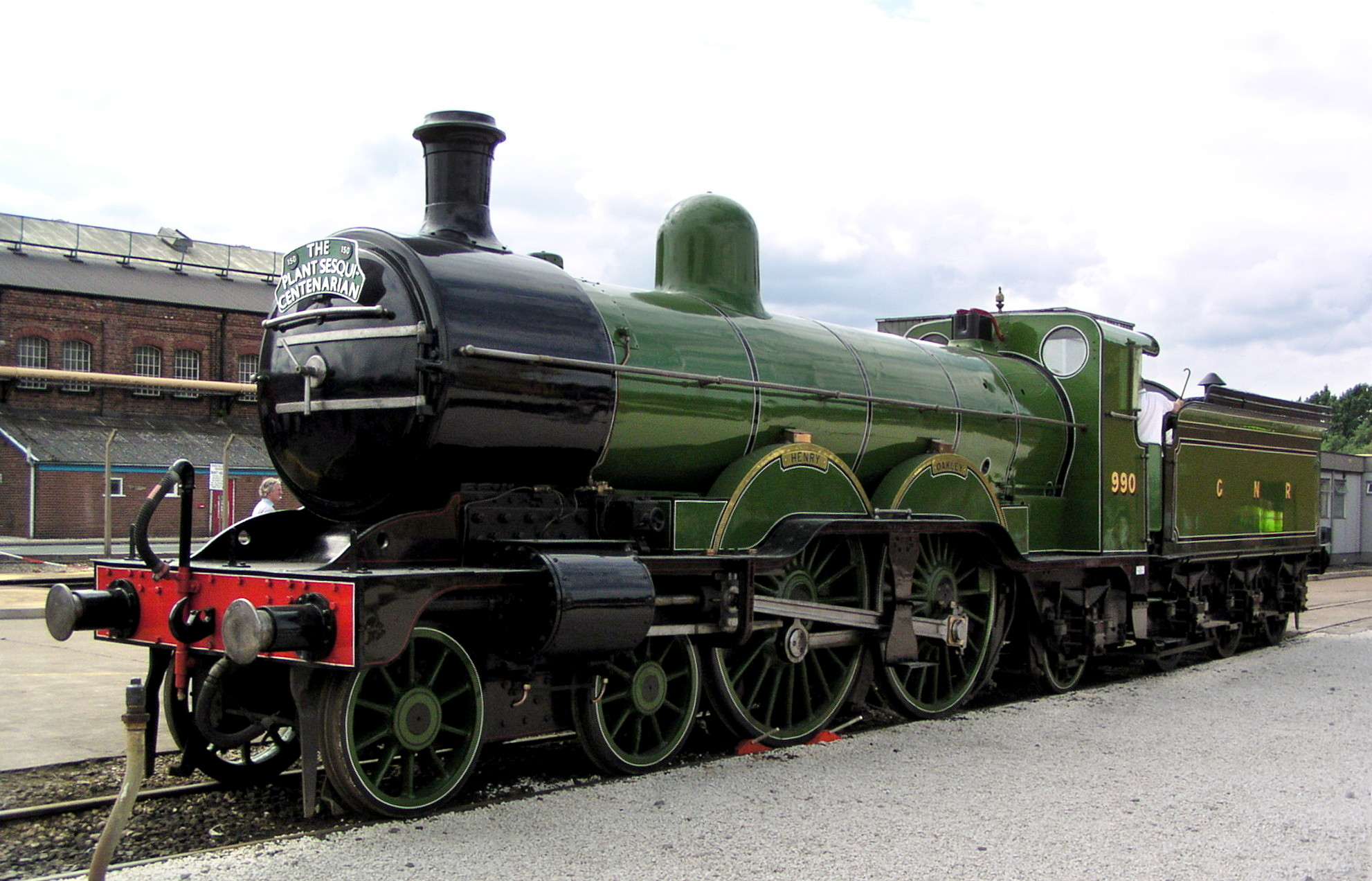
The GNR's Class C1 Klondyke Atlantic of 1898, Henry Oakley

Following Henry Ivatt’s GNR Class C1 Klondyke Atlantic of 1898 and John Aspinall's L&YR Class 7 High-Flyer, of which forty were built between 1899 and 1902, a lot of interest was shown in the Atlantic type by British railways during the first decade of the twentieth century, especially for express passenger train service. Between 1902 and 1908, Ivatt built eighty larger boilered versions of his GNR Class C1, which were known as the Large Boiler Class C1. These remained in service until the early 1950s.

In 1903, for use in comparative trials against his own designs, George Jackson Churchward of the Great Western Railway (GWR) purchased three French De Glehn compound 4-4-2s, beginning with the GWR no. 102 La France and followed by two larger locomotives in 1905. Fourteen members of his two-cylinder 2900 Saint class locomotives were subsequently either built or rebuilt with this wheel arrangement, including one four-cylinder GWR 4000 Star class, no. 40 North Star. All of these were later rebuilt to a 4-6-0 wheel arrangement.

Wilson Worsdell of the North Eastern Railway (NER) designed his classes V and 4CC between 1903 and 1906, while his successor on the NER, Vincent Raven, introduced his V/09 and NER Class Z classes between 1910 and 1917. By 1918, however, the 4-4-2 type had been largely superseded by the 4-6-0 type in the United Kingdom.

The London, Brighton and South Coast Railway (LB&SCR) H1 class, introduced by D. E. Marsh in 1905 and 1906, was copied from the plans of the Ivatt C1 class, with minimal alterations. In 1911, L.B. Billinton was granted authority to construct a further six examples incorporating Schmidt superheaters, which became the LB&SCR H2 class.

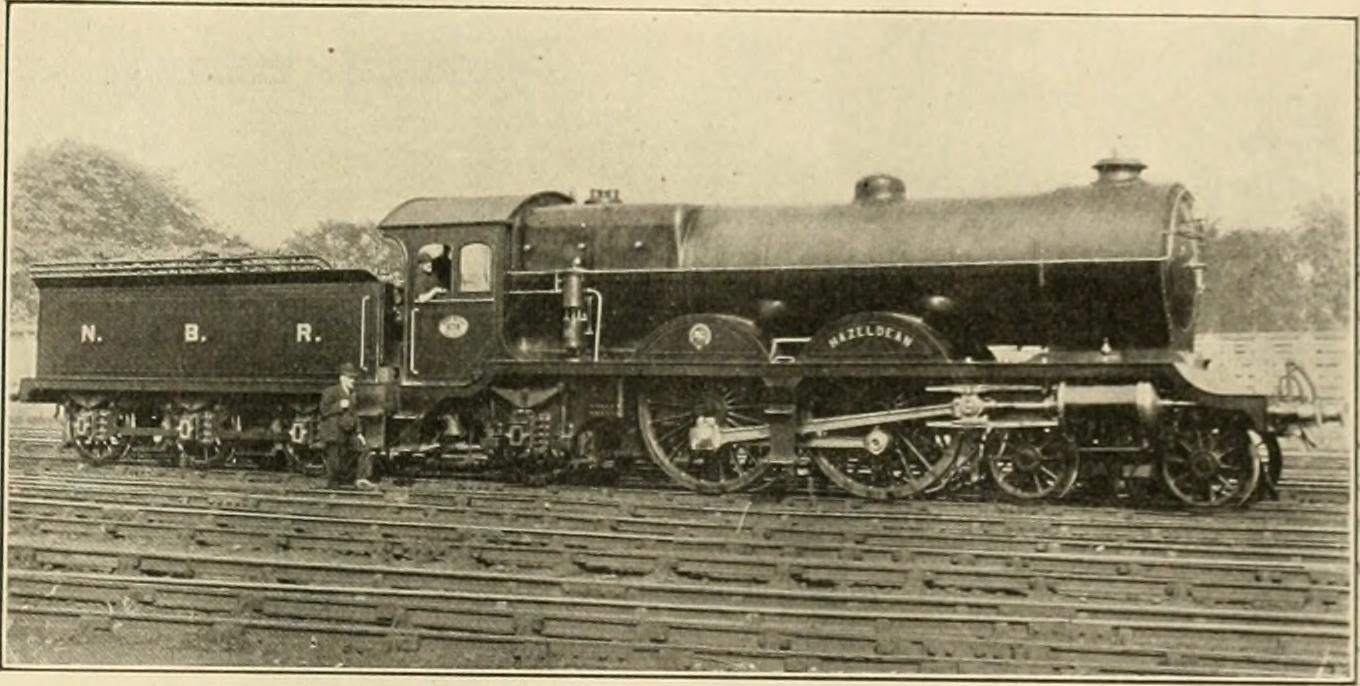
NBR H class from page 120 of "Railway and locomotive engineering - a practical journal of railway motive power and rolling stock" (1901)

William Paton Reid of the North British Railway built twenty examples of his North British Atlantic, later known as H class, between 1906 and 1911. Two more were built after his retirement and the whole class became the LNER C11 Class in the 1923 grouping, while John G. Robinson of the Great Central Railway (GCR) introduced his 8D and 8E classes of three-cylinder compound locomotives in 1905 and 1906.

==== Preserved locomotives ====
Several 4-4-2 locomotives were preserved in the United Kingdom. Bearing in mind that this information may become outdated over time, some known examples are:

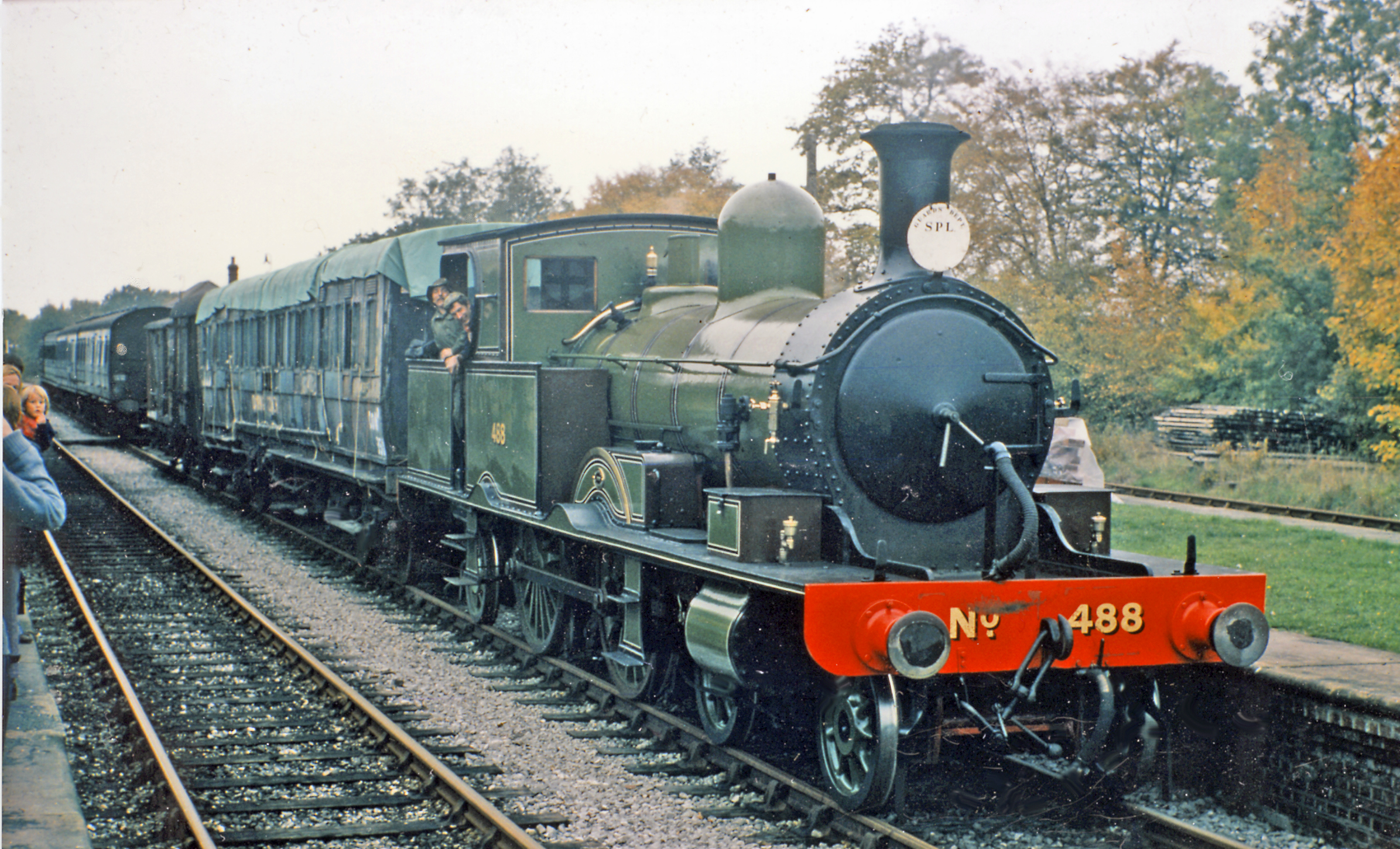
British 415 class 4-4-2T of the London and South Western Railway

- Great Northern Railway no. 990 Henry Oakley is part of the National Collection at the National Railway Museum in York, on static display at Bressingham Steam and Gardens in Norfolk.
- Great Northern Railway no. 251, the first large-boilered GNR Class C1, is part of the National Collection.
- The Bluebell Railway has completed a replica of a London, Brighton and South Coast Railway (LB&SCR) Atlantic No. 32424 Beachy Head, similar to the GNR large boilered Atlantics. They are also in possession of a London and South Western Railway (LSWR) 415 class locomotive, no. 488.
- The Great Western Society is working on a replica of a 4-6-0 Saint class locomotive. Some of these ran as Atlantic 4-4-2s for comparative purposes and it was planned that the replica would also run in an Atlantic wheel configuration from time to time.
- One of the four London, Tilbury and Southend Railway (LT&SR) 79 class locomotives, no. 80 Thundersley, is preserved at the Bressingham Steam Museum in Norfolk.
- BCDR 30 class No. 30 is on display at the Ulster Folk and Transport Museums, Cultra, Belfast.
- There are also 3 NSW Z13 locomotives preserved.

=== United States ===
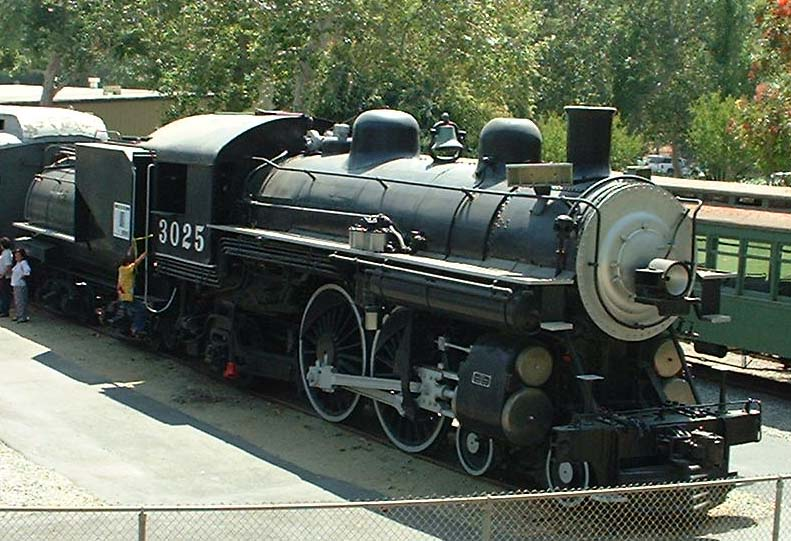
SP Class A-3 no. 3025 of 1904, on display at Travel Town in Los Angeles

The original Atlantics in the United States were built with the hauling of wood-frame passenger cars in mind and came in a variety of configurations, including the four-cylinder Vauclain compound which had previously been used on express 4-4-0 American, 4-6-0 Ten-wheeler and 2-4-2 Columbia locomotives. Around the 1910s, railroads started buying heavier steel passenger cars, which precipitated the introduction of the 4-6-2 Pacific type as the standard passenger locomotive. Nonetheless, the Chicago and North Western, Southern Pacific, Santa Fe and Pennsylvania railroads used 4-4-2 Atlantics until the end of steam locomotive use in the 1950s, with some even being used in local freight and switching service.

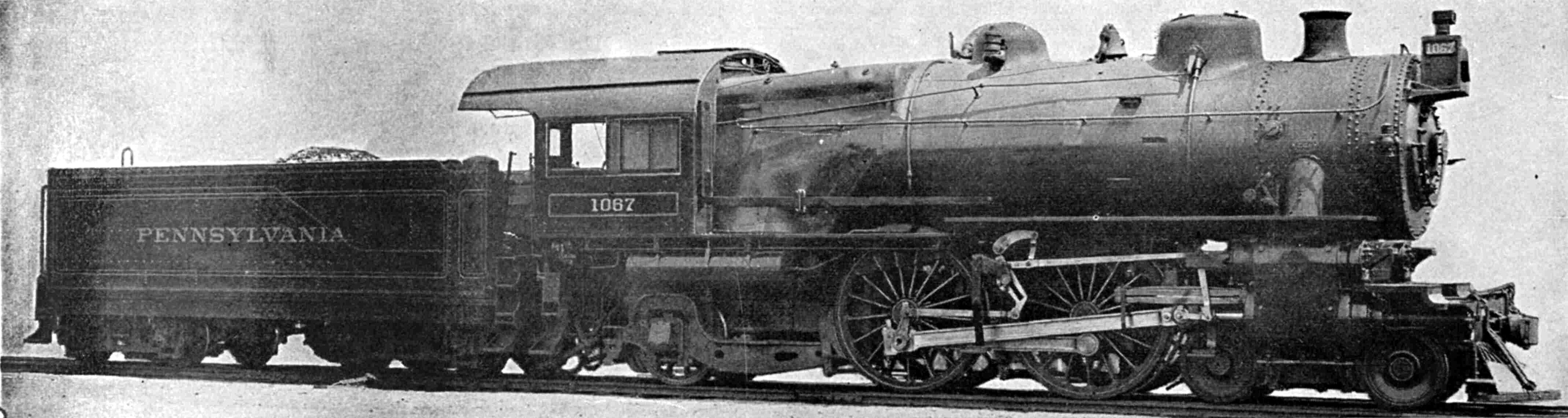
Pennsylvania Railroad E6s Class

One of the best-known groups of 4-4-2s in the United States was the Pennsylvania Railroad's vast fleet of E class Atlantics, culminating in the PRR E6s class.

Although Atlantics were sometimes used as mountain helpers prior to the First World War, they were not well-suited for mountain grades. They had large-diameter driving wheels, in some cases exceeding 72 inches (1,829 millimetres), which were adequate for 70-to-100-mile-per-hour (110-to-160-kilometre-per-hour) trains. They tended to oscillate at higher speeds when the drive rods were connected to the rear pair of drivers. This was not standard practice in the U.S., however. The nation's biggest user of the type was the Santa Fe with 178. All of these were built with 73-inch (185-centimetre) or 79-inch (201-centimetre) drivers and the drive rods connected to the first pair of driving wheels.

In 1905, Santa Fe engineer Charles Losee was widely reported to have driven Atlantic type 510, a 1904 balanced compound built by Baldwin, the 2.8 miles (4.5 kilometres) from Cameron to Surrey in Illinois with a three car special train in one minute and thirty-five seconds. If that had been confirmed by a disinterested party, the 106 miles (171 kilometres) per hour speed would have set a world record. These were never used on the road's Rocky Mountain grades; even on the flat plains of Kansas the Atlantics were soon overwhelmed by the weight of the newest all-steel, 85-foot (26-metre) passenger cars. Despite their excellent performance, most were retired long before other locomotives of their era, and the few survivors wound up on light local trains.

==== Milwaukee Road ====
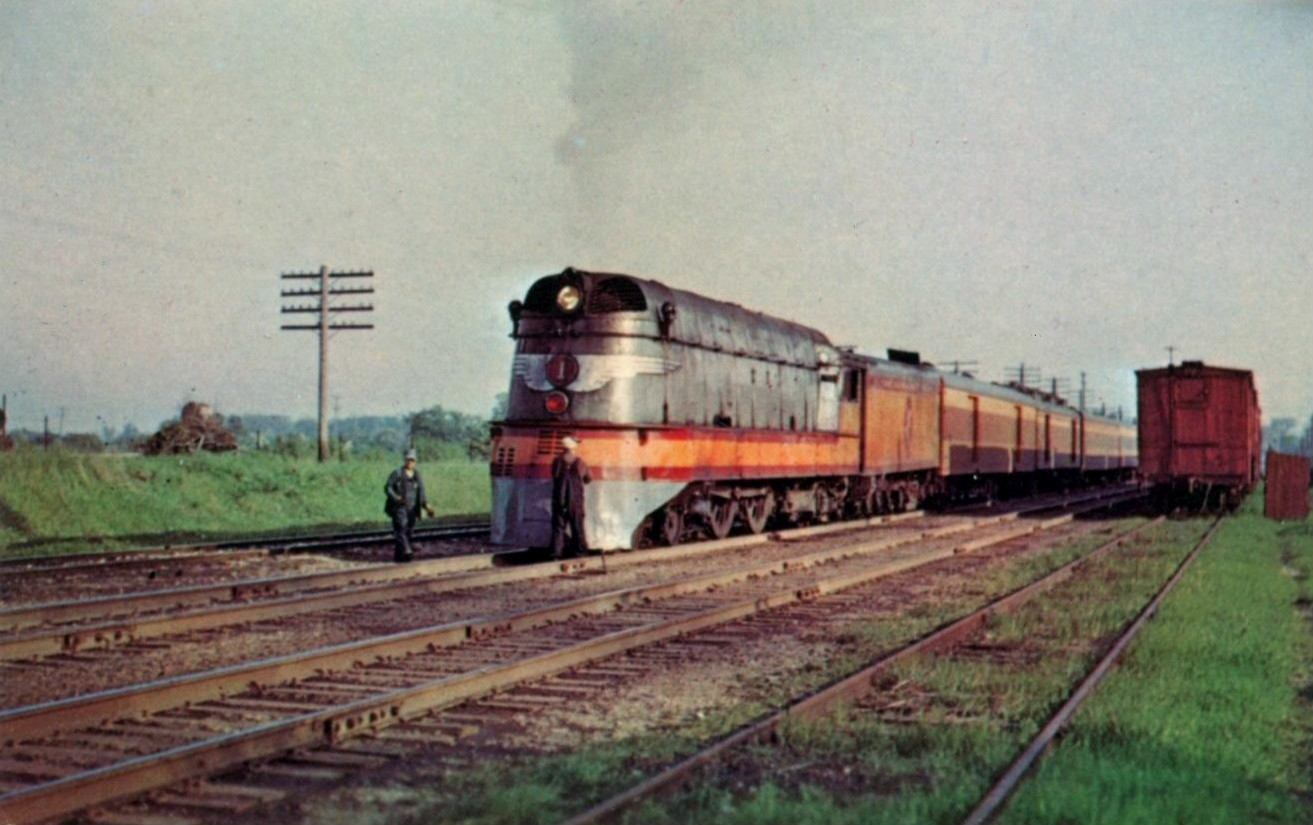
Milwaukee Road class A no. 1 in 1951.

The Chicago, Milwaukee, St. Paul and Pacific Railroad (Milwaukee Road) used a streamlined Atlantic type on its midwestern Hiawatha passenger train service that was instituted in 1935. Four 4-4-2 locomotives of the Milwaukee Road class A were constructed for this service in 1935. These 4-4-2s were reportedly the first steam locomotives ever designed and built to reach 100 miles per hour (160 kilometres per hour) on a daily basis.

These Atlantics with their distinctive streamlining shrouds were designed by industrial designer Otto Kuhler. Their calculated tractive effort was 30,685 pounds-force (136 kilonewtons). An unusual feature of this locomotive was the drive onto the front coupled axle, which improved riding quality at speed.

The locomotives were cross balanced and ran on 84-inch (2,134-millimetre) drivers. They had an oil-fired 69-square-foot (6.4-square-metre) grate and a rated boiler pressure of 300 pounds per square inch (2,100 kilopascals), which gave the boiler a high capacity in relation to the cylinders. Designed for a light-weight train of five to six passenger cars, they were considered as probably the fastest steam locomotives ever built in the United States, possibly capable of matching any locomotive in the world. The fleet covered their 431 miles (694 kilometres) schedule in 400 minutes with several stops en route, at an average speed of more than 100 miles per hour (160 kilometres per hour) on some sections and often arriving with one or two minutes to spare.

In addition, due to the locomotive being designed to operate at higher speeds, the Milwaukee Road's Atlantics were fitted with Leslie type A-125 air horns instead of the standard steam whistle.

All four locomotives were withdrawn and scrapped between 1949 and 1951.

==== Preserved locomotives ====
Several 4-4-2 locomotives were preserved in the United States. Bearing in mind that this information may become outdated over time, some known examples are:

- Southern Pacific no. 3025 at the Travel Town Museum in Los Angeles, CA.
- Chicago & North Western no. 1015 at the National Museum of Transportation in St. Louis, MO.
- Pennsylvania Railroad E6s no. 460 at the Railroad Museum of Pennsylvania in Strasburg, PA.
- Pennsylvania Railroad no. 7002, formerly no. 8063, at the Railroad Museum of Pennsylvania in Strasburg, PA. It has steamed since preservation, but is now static.
- Michigan Central no. 254 (later no. 7953, then New York Central no. 8085 before being sold to the Detroit, Toledo & Ironton Railroad as no. 45) at the Henry Ford Museum in Dearborn, MI.
- Central Railroad of New Jersey no. 592 at the National Museum of Railroad History & Innovation in Baltimore, MD.
