= C2 class =

C2 class or Class C2 may refer to:

- C2-class Melbourne tram
- GNR Class C2, 4-4-2 tank locomotives
- LB&SCR C2 class, 0-6-0 steam locomotives
