= LT&SR 1 Class =

Class of British steam locomotives

LT&SR 1 class
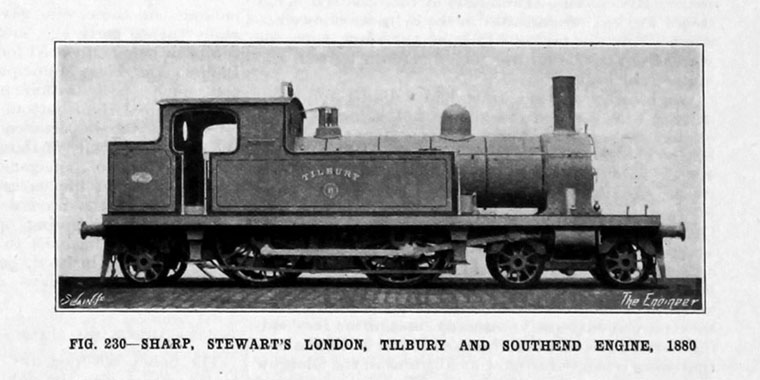
- Works photograph of the LT&SR 1 Class built by Sharp, Stewart & Co.
Type and origin
- Power type: Steam
- Designer: William Adams/Thomas Whitelegg
- Builder: Sharp, Stewart & Co., Nasmyth, Wilson & Co.
- Build date: 1880–1892
- Total produced: 36
Specifications
- Configuration
  - Whyte: 4-4-2T
  - UIC: 2′B1 n2t
- Gauge: 4 ft 8 1/2 in (1,435 mm)
- Leading dia.: 3 ft 1 in (940 mm)
- Driver dia.: 6 ft 0 in (1,830 mm)
- Trailing dia.: 3 ft 1 in (940 mm)
- Wheelbase: 8,940 mm (29 ft 4 in)
- Length: 11,200 mm (36 ft 9 in)
- Height: 3,996 mm (13 ft 1.3 in)
- Adhesive weight: 32.7 tonnes (32.2 long tons; 36.0 short tons)
- Loco weight: 58.60 long tons (59.54 t)
- Fuel type: Coal
- Fuel capacity: 2.0 tonnes (2.0 long tons; 2.2 short tons)
- Water cap.: 5,900 L (1,300 imp gal; 1,600 US gal)
- Firebox
  - Grate area: 17 sq ft (1.6 m^{2})
- Boiler pressure: 160 psi (1.10 MPa)
- Heating surface
  - Tubes: 85.5 m^{2} (920 sq ft)
  - Total surface: 1,020 sq ft (95 m^{2})
- Cylinders: Two, outside
- Cylinder size: 17 in × 26 in (432 mm × 660 mm)
- Valve gear: Stephenson
Performance figures
- Tractive effort: 13,998 lbf (62.3 kN)
Career
- Operators: LTSR; MR; LMS
- Power class: MR/LMS: 1P
- Number in class: 1 January 1923: 36
- Nicknames: "Tilbury tank"
- Withdrawn: 1929–1936
- Disposition: All scrapped

The London, Tilbury and Southend Railway 1 class was a class of 4-4-2T suburban tank engines. Thirty-six were built between 1880–1892, by Sharp, Stewart and Company and Nasmyth, Wilson and Company. They were the first locomotives owned by the London, Tilbury and Southend Railway and were the first 4-4-2T locomotives to operate in Britain.

== Background ==
Prior to 3 July 1880, all train services on the London, Tilbury and Southend Railway (LT&SR) had been run by the Great Eastern Railway (GER) under contract. An injunction prevented the GER from building locomotives for the LT&SR after this date. The railway therefore approached William Adams, a former locomotive superintendent of the GER, then working for the London and South Western Railway who supervised the new design which was officially ascribed to Thomas Whitelegg.

== Design ==
The design was based on William Adams's 46 class 4-4-0T but with 6 ft 1 in (1.854 m) driving wheels and an extended coal bunker supported by a radial axle making them the first 4-4-2 tanks to be used in the United Kingdom.

Eighteen locomotives were built by Sharp, Stewart and Company in 1880-1881, followed by a further twelve in 1885, and a final batch of six by Nasmyth, Wilson & Co. in 1895. They were used on the railway's commuter services between London Fenchurch Street railway station and Upminster, Southend and Tilbury. The class proved successful and most survived in service for fifty years or more. One member of this class was recorded as having hauled a train of 240 t (236 long tons; 265 short tons) at an average of 82.2 km/h (51.1 mph) to Southend with water taken during runs.

The merit of the engines was such that enlarged versions, the LT&SR 37 Class, LT&SR 51 Class and LTSR 79 Class, were produced in 1897, 1900 and 1909 respectively, and the LMS built further examples of the 79 Class as late as 1930. In total, 97 engines of the four classes were built over a 50 year period.

== Numbering ==
On the LTSR they were numbered 1–36 and named for places on or near their railway line. In 1912, the LTSR was absorbed by the Midland Railway and the locomotives were renumbered 2110–2145 and the names removed. At the grouping in 1923, all passed to the London, Midland and Scottish Railway and at first retained their former MR numbers. However between 1923 and 1927 twenty-five were progressively renumbered—2110–19 to 2200–09 in 1923, 2120–24 to 2210–14 in 1925, and 2125–34 to 2190–99. In 1930, all 36 were renumbered in the 2056–2091 range.

Retirements started in 1929, and by 1936, all had been withdrawn and scrapped.

== Fleet details ==
LTSR No.	LTSR Name	Builder	Built	MR No. & 1st LMS No.	LMS 1923–27 Renumber	LMS 1930 No.	Withdrawn
1	Southend	Sharp Stewart 2880	1880	2110	2200	2077	1930
2	Gravesend	Sharp Stewart 2881	1880	2111	2201	2078	1935
3	Tilbury	Sharp Stewart 2882	1880	2112	2202	2079	1935
4	Bromley	Sharp Stewart 2883	1880	2113	2203	2080	1932
5	Plaistow	Sharp Stewart 2884	1880	2114	2204	2081	1930
6	Upton Park	Sharp Stewart 2885	1880	2115	2205	2082	1933
7	Barking	Sharp Stewart 2886	1880	2116	2206	2083	1935
8	Rainham	Sharp Stewart 2887	1880	2117	2207	2084	1933
9	Tilbury Docks	Sharp Stewart 2888	1880	2118	2208	2085	1930
10	Grays	Sharp Stewart 2889	1880	2119	2209	2086	1930
11	Stanford	Sharp Stewart 2890	1880	2120	2210	2087	1930
12	Pitsea	Sharp Stewart 2891	1880	2121	2211	2088	1930
13	Black Horse Road	Sharp Stewart 2969	1881	2122	2212	2089	1932
14	Leigh	Sharp Stewart 2970	1881	2123	2213	2090	1935
15	East Ham	Sharp Stewart 2971	1881	2124	2214	2091	1933
16	Low Street	Sharp Stewart 3018	1881	2125	2190	2067	1934
17	Thames Haven	Sharp Stewart 3019	1881	2126	2191	2068	1935
18	Burdett Road	Sharp Stewart 3020	1881	2127	2192	2069	1930
19	Dagenham	Sharp Stewart 3217	1884	2128	2193	2070	1935
20	Hornchurch	Sharp Stewart 3218	1884	2129	2194	2071	1932
21	Upminster	Sharp Stewart 3219	1884	2130	2195	2072	1932
22	Commercial Road	Sharp Stewart 3220	1885	2131	2196	2073	1935
23	Laindon	Sharp Stewart 3221	1885	2132	2197	2074	1930
24	Ockendon	Sharp Stewart 3222	1885	2133	2198	2075	1935
25	Stifford	Sharp Stewart 3223	1885	2134	2199	2076	1935
26	West Thurrock	Sharp Stewart 3224	1885	2135	—	2056	1932
27	Whitechapel	Sharp Stewart 3225	1885	2136	—	2057	1932
28	Romford	Sharp Stewart 3226	1885	2137	—	2058	1935
29	Stepney	Sharp Stewart 3227	1885	2138	—	2059	1932
30	Fenchurch	Sharp Stewart 3228	1885	2139	—	2060	1934
31	St. Pancras	Nasmyth Wilson 425	1892	2140	—	2061	1933
32	Leyton	Nasmyth Wilson 426	1892	2141	—	2062	1933
33	Wanstead	Nasmyth Wilson 427	1892	2142	—	2063	1935
34	Tottenham	Nasmyth Wilson 428	1892	2143	—	2064	1930
35	West Ham	Nasmyth Wilson 429	1892	2144	—	2065	1933
36	Walthamstow	Nasmyth Wilson 430	1892	2145	—	2066	1932
