= GNR Class C1 (large boiler) =

Type of locomotive

Great Northern Railway large boiler class C1 London & North Eastern Railway class C1
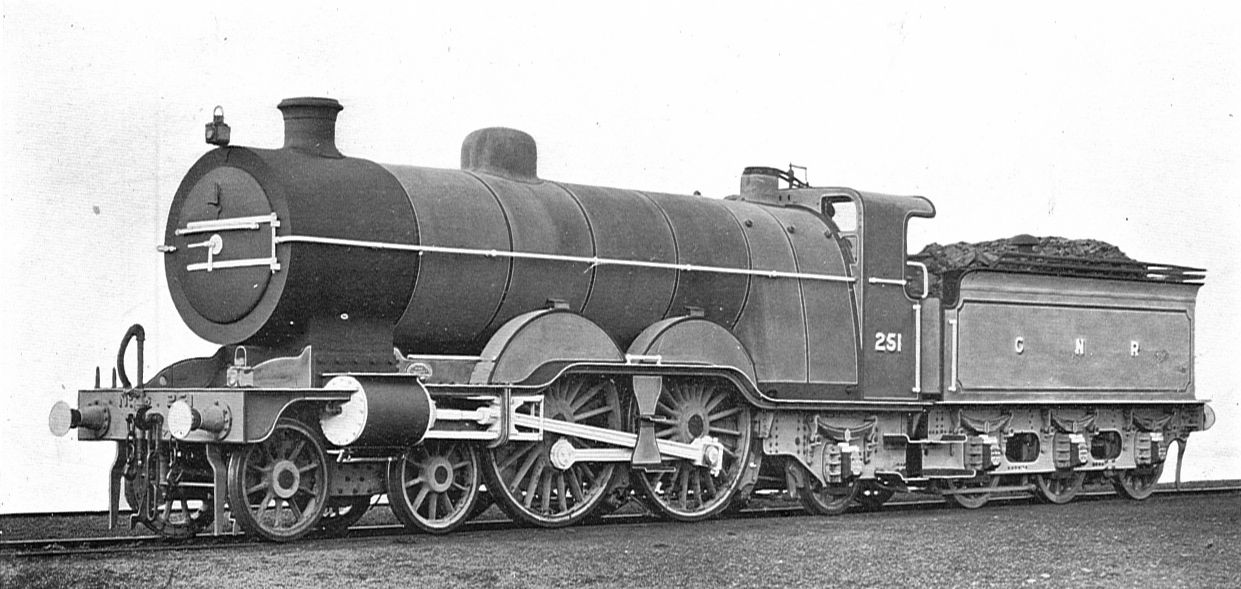
- 251, when new in photographic grey
Type and origin
- Power type: Steam
- Designer: Henry Ivatt
- Builder: Doncaster Works
- Build date: 1902–1910
- Total produced: 94
Specifications
- Configuration
  - Whyte: 4-4-2
  - UIC: 2′B1
- Gauge: 4 ft 8 1/2 in (1,435 mm) standard gauge
- Leading dia.: 3 ft 8 in (1.118 m)
- Driver dia.: 6 ft 8 in (2.032 m)
- Trailing dia.: 3 ft 8 in (1.118 m)
- Wheelbase: 48 ft 5.5 in (14.77 m)
- Axle load: 20 long tons (20 t; 22 short tons)
- Adhesive weight: 40 long tons (41 t; 45 short tons)
- Loco weight: 69.6 long tons (70.7 t; 78.0 short tons)
- Tender weight: 43.1 long tons (43.8 t; 48.3 short tons)
- Total weight: 112.7 long tons (114.5 t; 126.2 short tons)
- Tender type: Class B
- Fuel type: Coal
- Fuel capacity: 6.5 long tons (6.6 t; 7.3 short tons)
- Water cap.: 3,500 imperial gallons (15,911 L; 4,203 US gal)
- Boiler pressure: 170 psi (1.2 MPa) (Saturated); 150 psi (1.0 MPa) (Superheated); 200 psi (1.4 MPa) (3292 & 1300)
- Cylinders: Two, outside (Majority), Four (2 outside + 2 inside) on No. 3292 Compound & 3279
- Cylinder size: 19 in × 24 in (483 mm × 610 mm); or 20 in × 24 in (508 mm × 610 mm) (Majority), 13 in × 20 in (330 mm × 508 mm) (high pressure cylinders on compound); 16 in × 26 in (406 mm × 660 mm) (low pressure cylinders on compound), 15 in × 26 in (381 mm × 660 mm) (No. 3279); 20 in × 26 in (508 mm × 660 mm) (No. 1300)
- Valve gear: Stephenson
- Valve type: Slide valves or 8-inch (203 mm) piston valves (10-inch (254 mm) on 1300)
Performance figures
- Tractive effort: between 13,808 lbf (61.4 kN) and 17,340 lbf (77.1 kN) (Majority), 21,326 lbf (94.9 kN) (3292 compound), 21,128 lbf (94.0 kN) (3279), 22,100 lbf (98.3 kN) (1300)
Career
- Operators: Great Northern Railway; → London and North Eastern Railway; → British Railways
- Power class: BR: 2P
- Axle load class: LNER: RA: 7
- Withdrawn: 1944-1950
- Disposition: No. 251 preserved at the National Collection, remainder scrapped

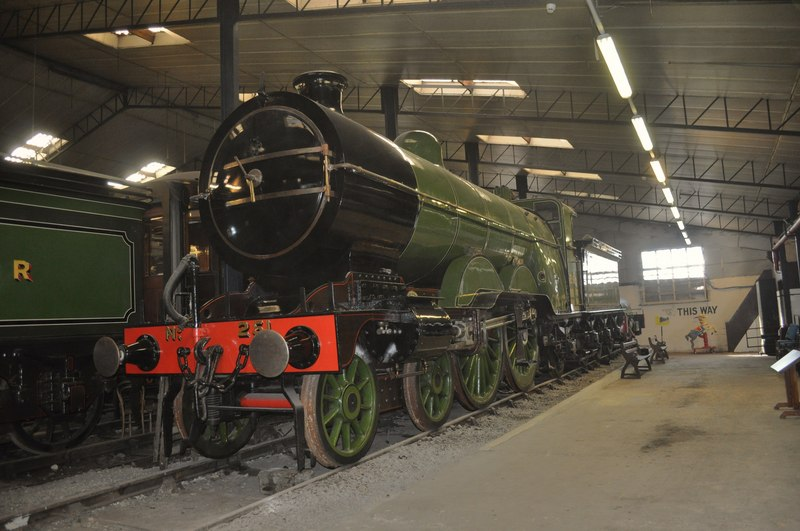
The preserved 251 at Bressingham

The Great Northern Railway (GNR) Class C1 is a type of 4-4-2 steam locomotive. One, ex GNR 251 (later LNER 3251 in 1924, and LNER 2800 in 1946), survives in preservation. Much like their small boiler cousins, they were capable of reaching speeds of up to 90 mph (145 km/h). They were also known as Large Atlantics.

== Development ==
The C1 Class, as it was known under both GNR & LNER classifications, was designed by Henry Ivatt as an enlarged version of what became the LNER C2 Class. The principle of the design was to produce a powerful, free-steaming engine to haul the fastest and heaviest express trains on the Great Northern. They could thus be seen as the start of the East Coast 'Big Engine' policy. None were ever named.

== First engine and improvements ==
The first engine, No. 251, was introduced in 1902, with eighty more being built at Doncaster Works between 1904 and 1908. Although they suffered from a number of teething troubles, the Atlantics were generally very successful. They were originally fitted with slide valves, but later gained piston valves, which produced a notable improvement in performance. The Atlantics remained in front-line service for many years, sometimes hauling trains over 500 long tons (508 t; 560 short tons). They were known to reach speeds up to 90 mph (140 km/h).

== Variants ==
On the GNR, the classification C1 was used for all of their 4-4-2 tender locomotives, but there was considerable variation within the 116 locomotives making up this group. The LNER divided them into two classes: C2 for the 22 locomotives built in 1898–1903 with boilers of 4 feet 8 inches (1.42 m) diameter; and C1 for the remaining 94, which mostly had boilers of 5 ft 6 in (1.68 m) diameter – but there were several locomotives within the latter group that differed significantly from the others.

The "standard" variety of large-boiler C1 was represented by nos. 251, 272–291, 293–301, 1400–20 and 1422–51 built at Doncaster between 1902 and 1908. These had boilers producing saturated steam at a pressure of 175 lbf/in^{2} (1,210 kPa) and two outside cylinders, having a diameter of 18 3/4 in (480 mm) and a stroke of 24 in (610 mm) using simple expansion driving the rear coupled wheels and fed through slide valves.

No. 292, built at Doncaster in 1904 (but not entering service until 1905), was a four-cylinder compound. The high-pressure cylinders, having a diameter of 13 in (330 mm) and a stroke of 20 in (510 mm), were outside the frames, driving the rear coupled wheels; and the low-pressure cylinders, 16 by 26 in (410 by 660 mm) were inside, driving the front coupled axle. The valves were arranged so that the locomotive could work either as a compound or as a four-cylinder simple. The boiler pressure was 200 lbf/in^{2} (1,400 kPa), but whilst the boiler was under repair, the locomotive used a 175 lbf/in^{2} (1,210 kPa) boiler from 1910 to 1912. This locomotive was withdrawn in 1927 and scrapped in 1928.

No. 1300, another four-cylinder compound, was an experimental locomotive which differed greatly from all of the others. It was built by Vulcan Foundry in 1905, largely to their own design although to Ivatt's specifications. The boiler had a narrow firebox, a diameter of 5 ft 3 in (1.60 m) and a pressure of 200 lbf/in^{2} (1,400 kPa). As with No. 292, the high-pressure cylinders were outside, driving the rear coupled wheels, whilst the low-pressure cylinders were inside, driving the front coupled axle; but their dimensions were 14 by 26 in (360 by 660 mm) and 23 by 26 in (580 by 660 mm) respectively. The engine worked as a two-cylinder simple on starting, changing over to compound expansion automatically. A superheater was fitted in 1914, and the engine was rebuilt as a two-cylinder simple in 1917; the new cylinders were outside, 20 by 26 in (510 by 660 mm) of the type used on class H3, driving the leading coupled wheels. It was withdrawn in 1924.

No. 1421, built at Doncaster in 1907 was again a four-cylinder compound, but differed from No. 292 in a number of ways; in particular, the inside cylinder diameter was increased to 18 in (460 mm). It was superheated in 1914 and rebuilt in 1920 as a two-cylinder simple with piston valves. It was then generally similar to the standard engines after they had been superheated, and it ran until 1947.

The last ten, Nos. 1452–61 built at Doncaster in 1910, had boilers producing superheated steam at 150 lbf/in^{2} (1,000 kPa), and the cylinders were fed through piston valves.

No. 279 was rebuilt in 1915 with four cylinders 15 by 26 in (380 by 660 mm) utilising simple expansion and driving the rear coupled axle. It was rebuilt back to a two-cylinder simple in 1938, but using 20 by 26 in (510 by 660 mm) cylinders of the type used on class K2 having the piston valves above the cylinders; in this form it ran until 1948.

No. 1419 (renumbered 4419 in May 1924) was equipped with a booster engine on the trailing axle in July 1923; to accommodate this, the frames were lengthened at the rear, which also allowed a larger cab to be fitted. At the same time, the locomotive was given a superheater and piston valves, in line with others of the class. The booster, being for extra power at very low speeds, were little use at speeds over 25 mph (40 km/h) and removed temporarily between July 1924 and February 1925. It was permanently removed in November 1935.

== Later years ==
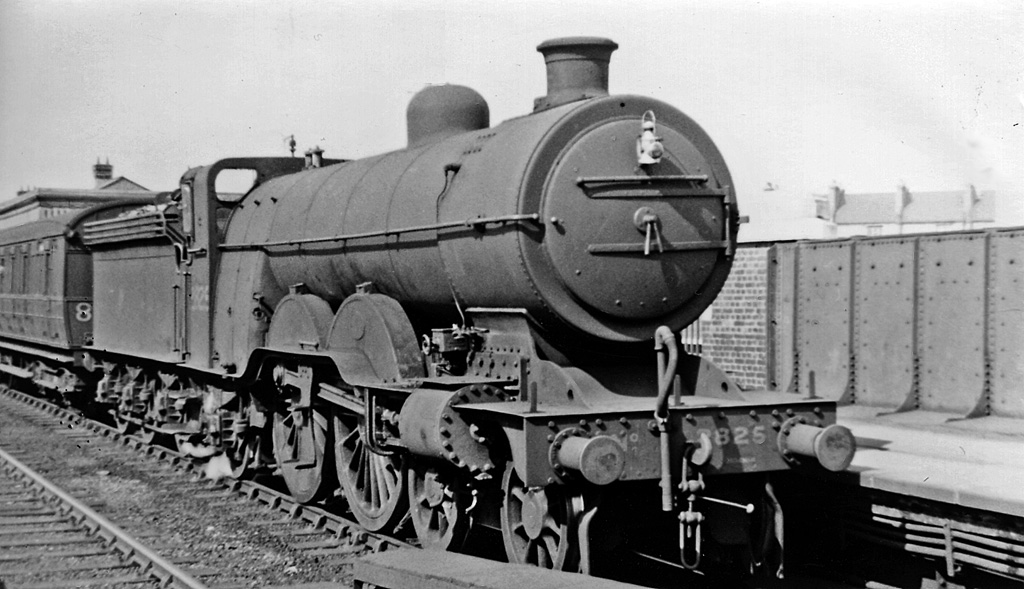
No. 2825 on a stopping train at Seven Sisters, 1946

They were eventually superseded on the heaviest trains by the Gresley A1 Pacifics in the early 1920s. They continued to haul lighter expresses up until 1950, although this did include the Harrogate Pullman for a period during the 1920s and 1930s. They were often called upon to take over trains from failed Pacifics and put up some remarkable performances with loads far in excess of those they were designed to haul. One once took over the Flying Scotsman from a failed A3 at Peterborough and not only made up time but arrived early.

== Accidents and incidents ==
- On 19 September 1906, locomotive No. 276 was hauling a sleeper train which was derailed at Grantham, Lincolnshire due to excessive speed through the station after passing signals at danger. Fourteen people were killed and seventeen were injured.
- On 13 February 1923, locomotive No. 298 was hauling an express passenger train that overran signals and was in a rear-end collision with a freight train at Retford, Nottinghamshire. Three people were killed.

- On 15 June 1935, locomotive No. 4411 was hauling a passenger train that was run into by an express passenger train at Welwyn Garden City due to a signalman's error. Fourteen people were killed and 29 were injured.

== British Railways ownership ==
Seventeen C1s entered British Railways service, albeit for a short time. According to The Railway Magazine, the last engine in service was BR 62822, ex GNR 294. On 26 November 1950 it hauled a train one way from Kings Cross to Doncaster to mark the end of the C1s. Among the many on board was the son of H.A. Ivatt, H.G. Ivatt, who received one of the builder's plates. On display at Doncaster was pioneer member No. 251, already preserved, and a number of modern engines. The return trip to London was hauled by A1 Pacific 60123 H.A. Ivatt.

== Preservation ==
Pioneer 251, LNER 3251 (by 1923) and LNER 2800 (by 1946), had been saved for the UK National Collection even before the last one was withdrawn from revenue service in 1950. Restored to GNR livery it is the only C1 preserved. It joined preserved Atlantic GNR 990 Henry Oakley on two weekends of trips entitled Plant Centenarian in 1953, celebrating the 100th anniversary of the Doncaster Works. On 20 September the two engines, 990 leading, hauled the train from Kings Cross to Doncaster carrying nearly 500. LNER Class A4 2509 Silver Link (BR 60014) brought the train back to London. A similar trip a week later operated from Kings Cross to Leeds with a stop at Doncaster, with the GNR locos again hauling one part of the trip. No. 251 steamed poorly on these trips since its superheater had been removed and the boiler flues had not been replaced with small tubes to compensate. Further trips followed, the last being on 12 September 1954, but it was not until March 1957 that the locomotive was placed in York museum.

Since its preservation, the locomotive has spent time on display at the National Railway Museum, the Locomotion Museum in Shildon, Bressingham Steam and Gardens and Barrow Hill Roundhouse. As of 2021, No. 251 was on a three-year loan to the new Danum Gallery, Library and Museum in Doncaster.

== Surviving boilers ==
Two C1 boilers, one of which belonged to No. 3287, were discovered at a factory at Essex in 1986 by Steve Dymond and Nick Pigott, along with 1 GER Class Y14 boiler and 1 LSWR T1 class boiler, the revelation that the boiler once belonged to No. 3287 was unknown until 2005 when it was cleaned via a pressure washer. The boiler that once belonged to No. 3287 was in good condition and was purchased by the Bluebell Railway for their H2 project while the other boiler was scrapped due to it being in bad condition.
