= GNR Class C2 =

Class of British steam locomotives

Great Northern Railway C2 class London & North Eastern Railway C12
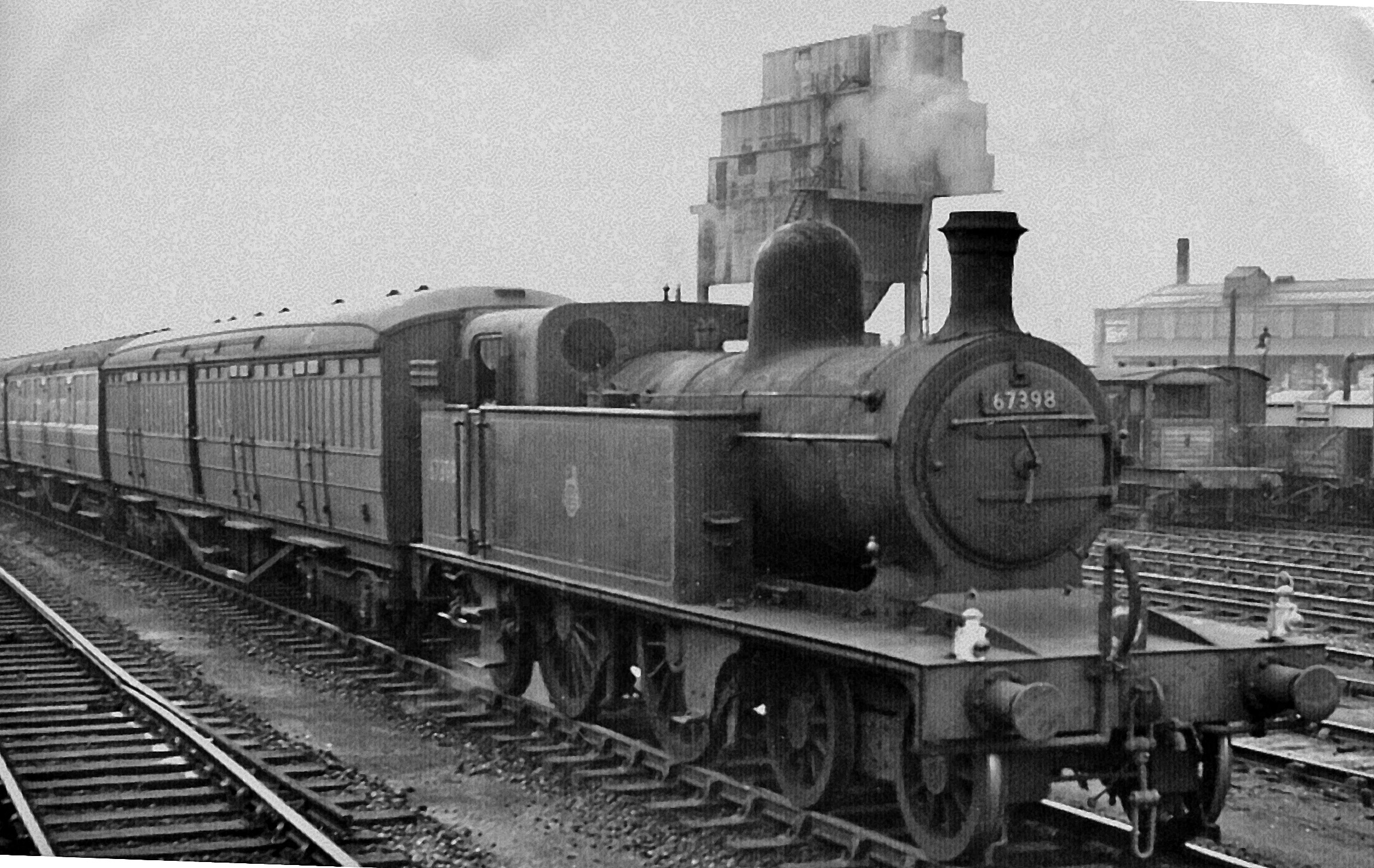
- 67398 shunting passenger stock at Peterborough in 1957
Type and origin
- Power type: Steam
- Designer: Henry Ivatt
- Builder: Doncaster Works
- Serial number: 755–758, 788–971, 796–797, 812–821, 832–841, 924–933, 1017–1026, 1155–1164
- Build date: 1898–1907
- Total produced: 60
Specifications
- Configuration
  - Whyte: 4-4-2T
- Gauge: 4 ft 8 1/2 in (1,435 mm)
- Leading dia.: 3 ft 8 in (1.118 m)
- Driver dia.: 5 ft 8 in (1.727 m)
- Trailing dia.: 3 ft 8 in (1.118 m)
- Loco weight: 62.30 long tons (63.30 t)
- Fuel type: Coal
- Fuel capacity: 2.50 long tons (2.54 t)
- Water cap.: 1,350 imperial gallons (6,100 L; 1,620 US gal)
- Boiler pressure: 170–175 psi (1.17–1.21 MPa)
- Cylinders: Two, inside
- Cylinder size: 18 in × 26 in (457 mm × 660 mm)
- Valve gear: Stephenson
- Valve type: Slide valves
Performance figures
- Tractive effort: 17,900–18,425 lbf (79.6–82.0 kN)
Career
- Operators: Great Northern Railway; → London & North Eastern Railway; → British Railways
- Number in class: 1 January 1923: 60, 1 January 1948: 49
- Numbers: GNR: 1009A, 1010, 1013–1020, 1501–1550
- Withdrawn: 1957–1958
- Disposition: All scrapped

The Great Northern Railway class C2 locomotives is a scrapped class of 4-4-2 tank locomotives built by the Great Northern Railway (GNR) between 1898 and 1907. They were used on local and commuter passenger trains in Yorkshire and North London. They were withdrawn between 1957 and 1958.

== Numbering ==
The GNR numbered them 1009, 1010, 1013–1020 and 1501–1550. In 1921, no. 1009 was renumbered 1009A, since its number was required for a new Class H4 2-6-0. All passed to the London and North Eastern Railway in 1923, who renumbered them by adding 3000 to their GNR number.

In the post World War II renumbering scheme, the remaining 50 locomotives were renumbered 7350–7399.

In 1948, the remaining 49 locomotives passed to British Railways, who renumbered them by prefixing a 6 to their LNER number (i.e. 67350–67399).
