= CGR 4th Class 4-4-2 =

Class of South African locomotives

CGR 4th Class 4-4-2 South African Class 04 4-4-2
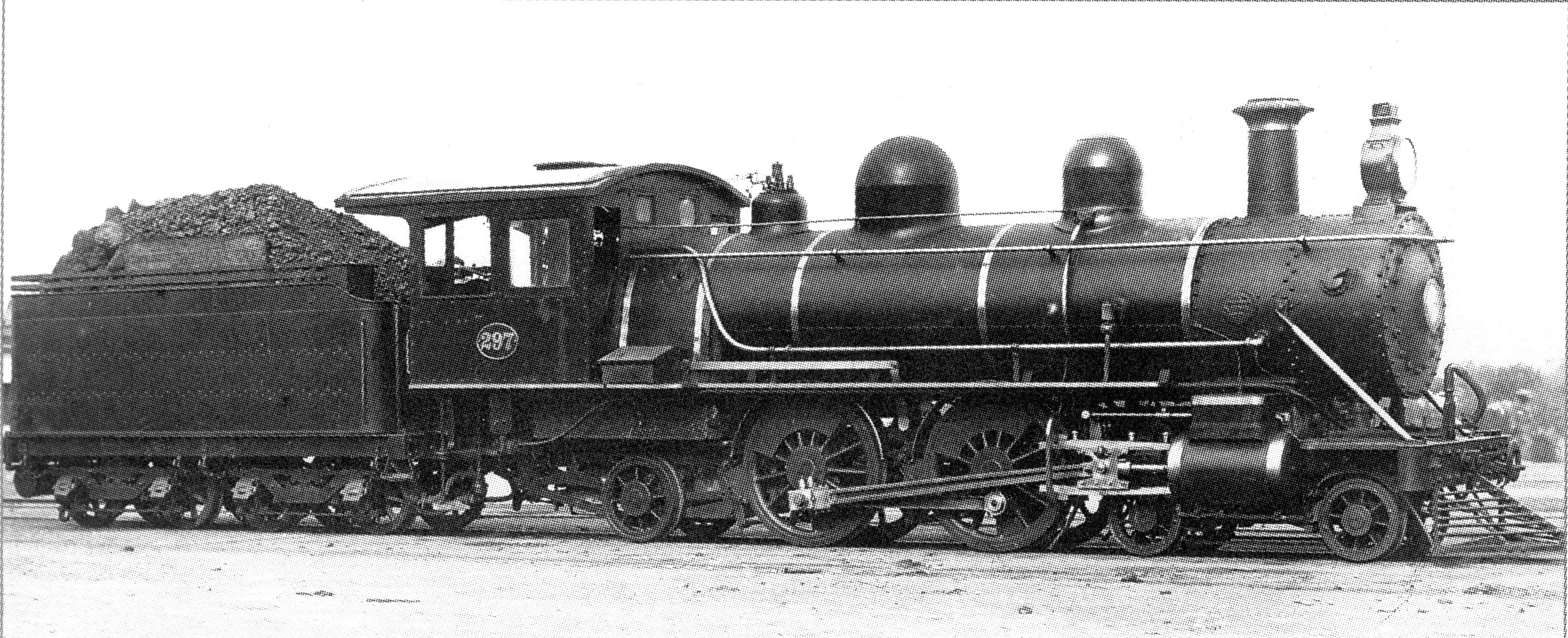
- CGR 4th Class 4-4-2 no. 297, c. 1910
Type and origin
- Power type: Steam
- Designer: Baldwin Locomotive Works
- Builder: Baldwin Locomotive Works
- Serial number: 15338-15343
- Model: JNR 6600-Class
- Build date: 1897
- Total produced: 30
Specifications
- Configuration
  - Whyte: 4-4-2 (Atlantic)
  - UIC: 2'B1'n2
- Driver: 2nd coupled axle
- Gauge: 3 ft 6 in (1,067 mm) Cape gauge
- Leading dia.: 28 in (711 mm)
- Coupled dia.: 56 in (1,422 mm)
- Trailing dia.: 33 in (838 mm)
- Tender wheels: 32 1/2 in (826 mm)
- Wheelbase: 45 ft 11 1/2 in (14,008 mm)
  - Engine: 22 ft 6 in (6,858 mm)
  - Leading: 6 ft (1,829 mm)
  - Coupled: 6 ft (1,829 mm)
  - Tender: 13 ft 3 in (4,039 mm)
  - Tender bogie: 4 ft 8 in (1,422 mm)
- Length
  - Over couplers: 53 ft 5 1/2 in (16,294 mm)
- Height: 12 ft 3 in (3,734 mm)
- Frame type: Bar
- Axle load: 12 LT 3 cwt (12,340 kg)
  - Leading: 10 LT 18 cwt (11,070 kg)
  - 1st coupled: 11 LT 12 cwt (11,790 kg)
  - 2nd coupled: 12 LT 3 cwt (12,340 kg)
- Adhesive weight: 23 LT 15 cwt (24,130 kg)
- Loco weight: 44 LT 16 cwt (45,520 kg)
- Tender weight: 30 LT 2 cwt (30,580 kg)
- Total weight: 74 LT 18 cwt (76,100 kg)
- Tender type: 2-axle bogies
- Fuel type: Coal
- Fuel capacity: 5 LT 15 cwt (5.8 t)
- Water cap.: 2,400 imp gal (10,900 L)
- Firebox
  - Type: Round-top
  - Grate area: 30 sq ft (2.8 m^{2})
- Boiler
  - Pitch: 6 ft 11 in (2,108 mm)
  - Diameter: 4 ft 8 7/8 in (1,445 mm)
  - Tube plates: 14 ft 9 3/8 in (4,505 mm)
  - Small tubes: 189: 2 in (51 mm)
- Boiler pressure: 180 psi (1,241 kPa)
- Safety valve: Ramsbottom
- Heating surface
  - Firebox: 98.15 sq ft (9.118 m^{2})
  - Tubes: 1,461.7 sq ft (135.80 m^{2})
  - Total surface: 1,559.85 sq ft (144.915 m^{2})
- Cylinders: Two
- Cylinder size: 16 in (406 mm) bore 22 in (559 mm) stroke
- Valve gear: Stephenson
- Couplers: Johnston link-and-pin
Performance figures
- Tractive effort: 13,580 lbf (60.4 kN) @ 75%
Career
- Operators: Nippon Railway; Japanese National Railways; Cape Government Railways; South African Railways
- Class: Nippon Rwy Bbt2/5 Class, JNR 6600-Class, CGR 4th Class, SAR Class 04
- Number in class: 6
- Numbers: 295-300
- Nicknames: Hatrack
- Delivered: 1897
- First run: 1897
- Withdrawn: 1931

The Cape Government Railways 4th Class 4-4-2 of 1897 was a South African steam locomotive from the pre-Union era in the Cape of Good Hope.

In 1897, the Cape Government Railways placed six 4th Class tender locomotives with a 4-4-2 Atlantic type wheel arrangement in service on the section from Kimberley southwards.

== Manufacturer ==
In 1896, at the time that an urgent requirement arose on the Cape Government Railways (CGR) for more locomotives for the section of the Western System from Kimberley to the south, locomotive production by the usual British suppliers was being disrupted by strikes which made delivery time uncertain. At the same time, the steamship companies had suddenly doubled all freight charges to the Cape. The CGR therefore approached locomotive builders in the United States of America.

Baldwin Locomotive Works, it turned out, had just completed an order for 24 6600-Class 4-4-2 Atlantic type tender locomotives, numbered in the range from 6600 to 6623, for the 3 feet 6 inches (1,067 millimetres) gauge Japanese State Railways. Baldwin offered to produce another six of the same type for the CGR. Since the Japanese locomotive met the requirements of the CGR, the offer was accepted.

Construction of the six locomotives was completed within sixty days of confirmation of the order. The new doubled freight rates of the steamship companies were circumvented by shipping the locomotives by sailing vessel, which convinced the steamship companies to promptly revert to their previous rates.

== Characteristics ==
The locomotives were designated 4th Class, in spite of being completely unlike any other in this Class on the CGR, and were numbered in the range from 295 to 300. They were the only Atlantic types to see service in South Africa.

They were of typical American design at the time, with bar frames, spacious cabs and high running boards. They had large boilers and large grates which had been designed to burn very poor quality coal. In service, they were found to be free steaming, excellent and smooth runners and low on maintenance costs. These qualities, with their roomy cabs and general handiness, made them popular with the enginemen, who nicknamed them Hatracks.

CGR Chief Locomotive Superintendent H.M. Beatty was equally impressed by the sturdy and simple construction and the good steaming qualities of these locomotives. The bar frame allowed the firebox to be placed on top of it and to make it 2 inches (51 millimetres) wider than what would have been possible with a plate frame on Cape gauge. Beatty became a firm believer in bar frames, to the extent that practically all his subsequent locomotive designs had such frames. Plate frames were only used again on locomotives which were acquired on repeat orders for existing locomotive types.

== Service ==
When the Union of South Africa was established on 31 May 1910, the three Colonial government railways (CGR, Natal Government Railways and Central South African Railways) were united under a single administration to control and administer the railways, ports and harbours of the Union. Although the South African Railways and Harbours came into existence in 1910, the actual classification and renumbering of all the rolling stock of the three constituent railways were only implemented with effect from 1 January 1912.

The six locomotives spent their entire service lives working in the Kimberley region. In 1912, the Baldwin-built Atlantics were considered obsolete by the SAR, designated Class 04 and renumbered by having the numeral "0" prefixed to their existing numbers. In spite of being considered obsolete, they were only scrapped in 1931.

== Works numbers ==
The locomotives were numbered in reverse order of their builder's works numbers. The works numbers, original numbers and renumbering of the CGR 4th Class Atlantics are listed in the table.

CGR 4th Class 4-4-2
Works no.	CGR no.	SAR no.
15343	295	0295
15342	296	0296
15341	297	0297
15340	298	0298
15339	299	0299
15338	300	0300

== Illustration ==
At left below is a Baldwin works photograph of the CGR locomotive, as built, while at right is the Baldwin works picture of the Japanese locomotive. Apart from the headlights, spring buffers and some other minor details, the locomotives are virtually identical.

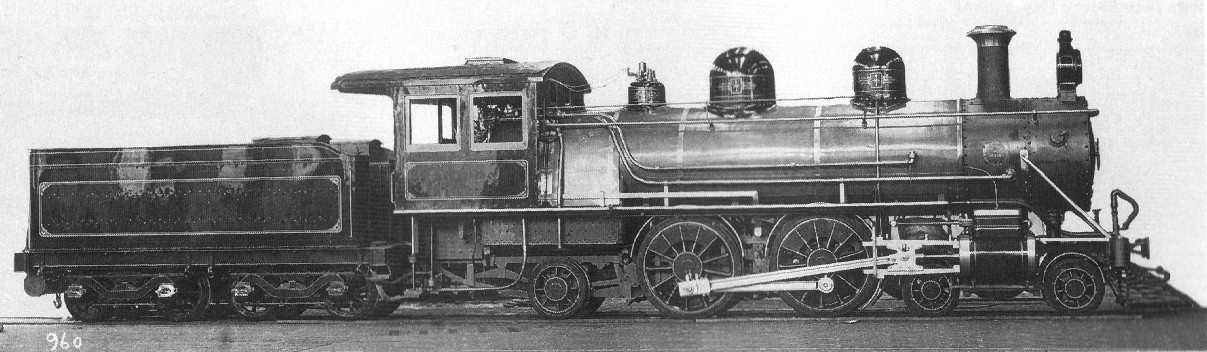
Baldwin works picture of the CGR 4th Class

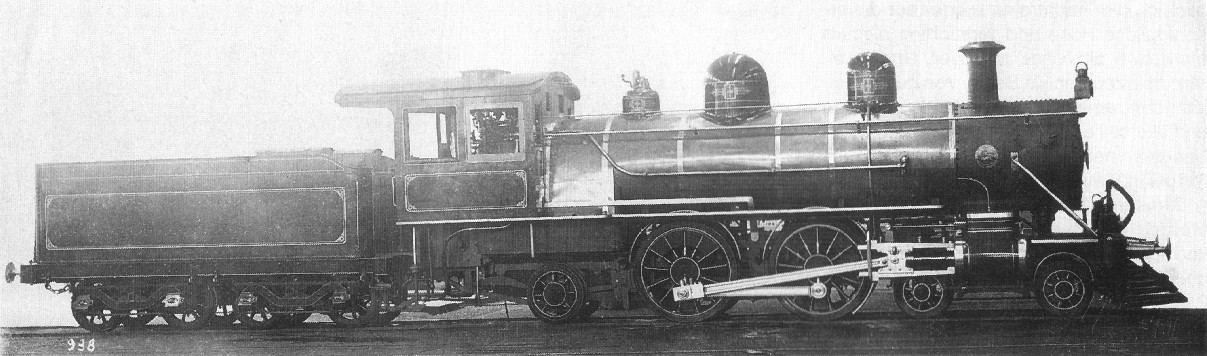
Baldwin works picture of the JNR 6600-6623 Class

The main picture of no. 297 in the CGR era and the following picture of no 0298 in the SAR era show both locomotives with tenders which were enlarged after they entered service.

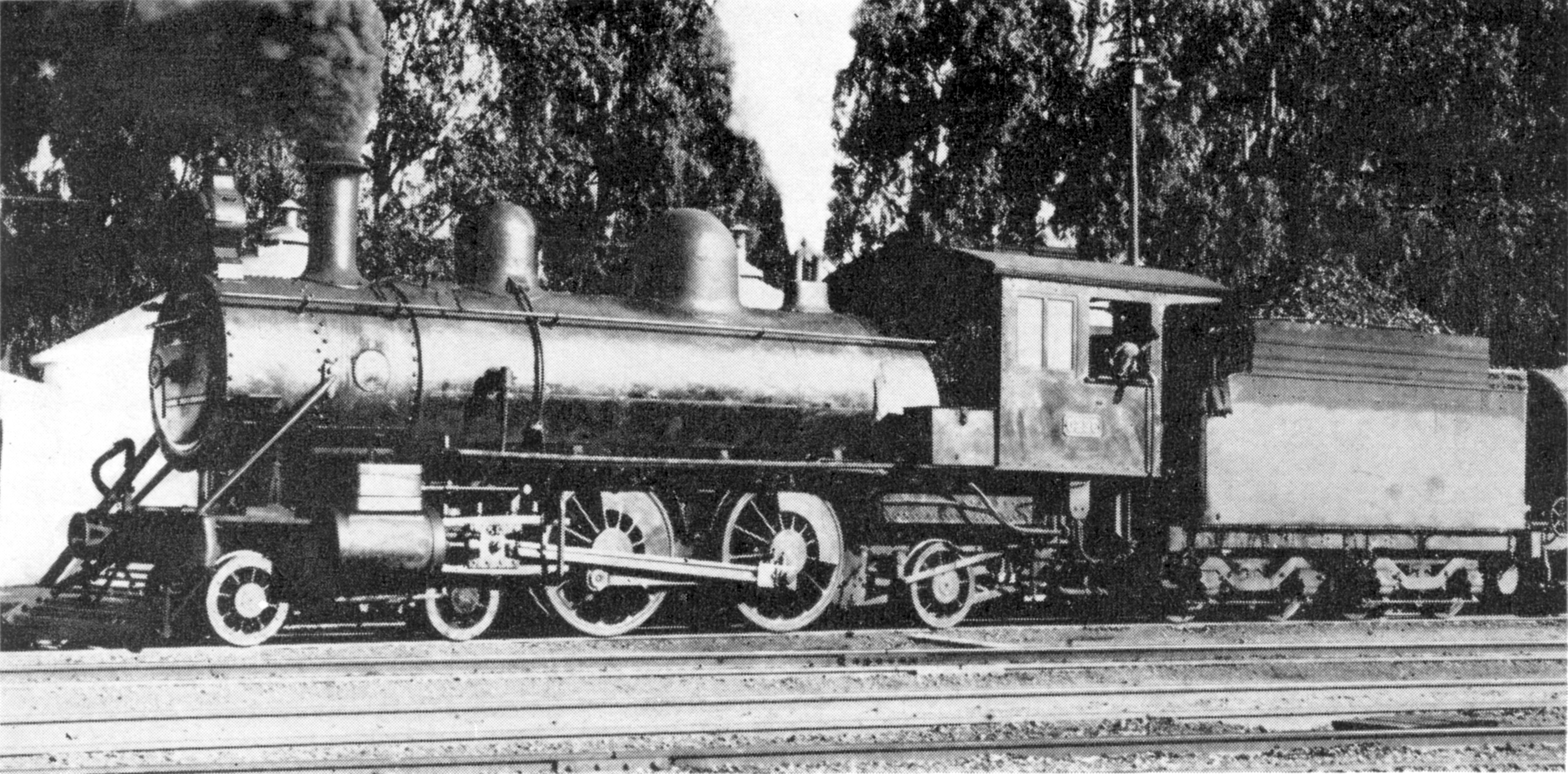
Class 04 no 0298 in SAR service, c. 1930
