= LT&SR 37 Class =

British 4-4-2T steam locomotive class, built 1897–1898

LT&SR 37 class
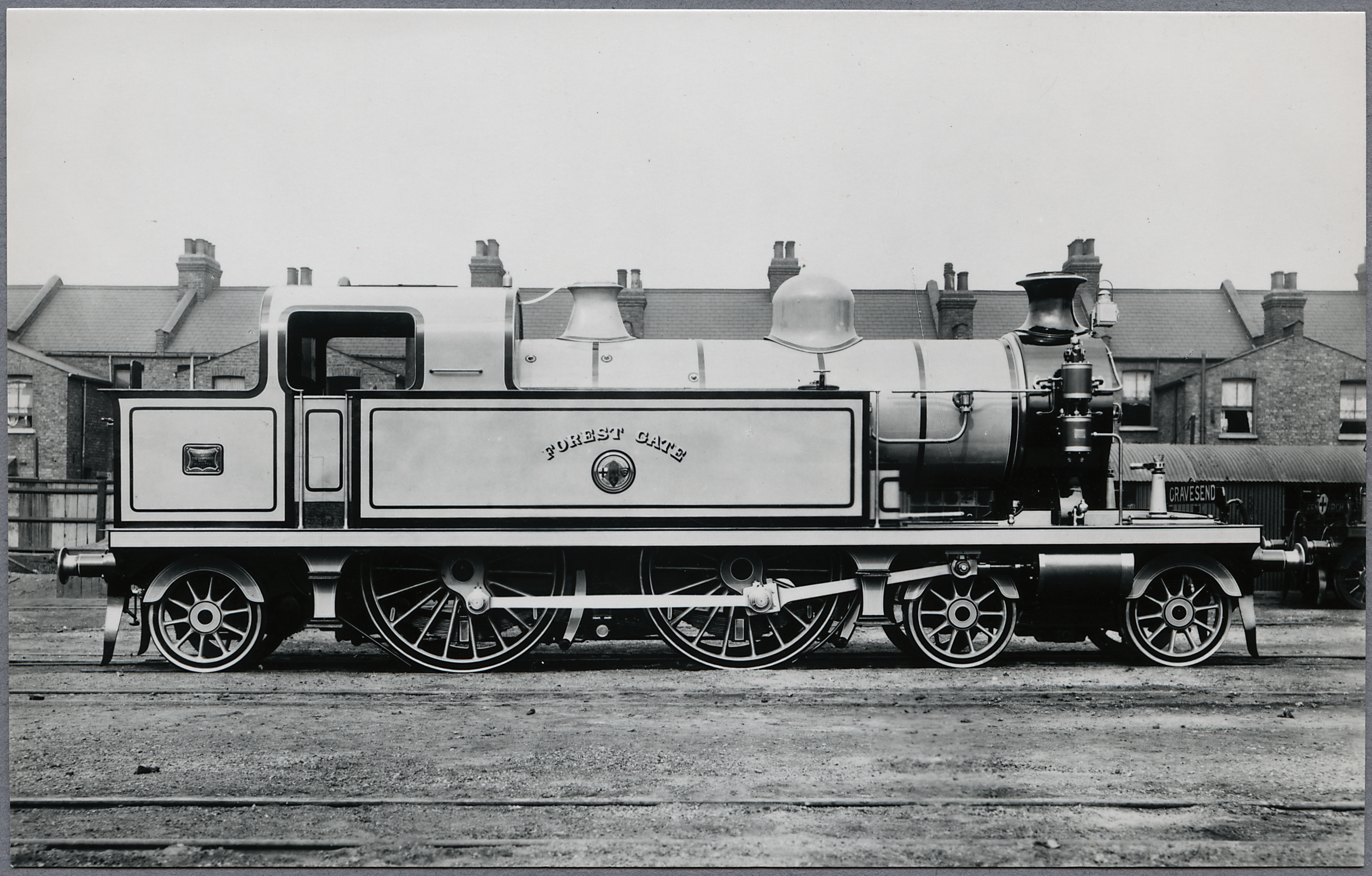
Type and origin
- Power type: Steam
- Designer: Thomas Whitelegg
- Builder: Sharp, Stewart & Co. (6), Dübs & Co. (6)
- Serial number: SS 4245–4250, Dübs 3666–3671
- Build date: 1897–1898
- Total produced: 12
Specifications
- Configuration
  - Whyte: 4-4-2T
  - UIC: 2′B1 n2t
- Driver dia.: 6 ft 6 in (1.981 m)
- Loco weight: 71.75 long tons (72.90 t)
- Fuel type: Coal
- Boiler pressure: 170 psi (1.17 MPa)
- Cylinders: Two, outside
- Cylinder size: 19 in × 26 in (483 mm × 660 mm)
- Valve gear: Stephenson
Performance figures
- Tractive effort: 17,390 lbf (77.4 kN)
Career
- Operators: LTSR; MR; LMS; BR
- Power class: LMS/BR: 3P
- Number in class: 1 January 1923: 12; 1 January 1948: 12
- Withdrawn: 1951–1952
- Disposition: All scrapped

The LTSR 37 class was a class of 4-4-2T suburban tank engines built for the London, Tilbury and Southend Railway in 1897–98. They were designed by Thomas Whitelegg as a development of the earlier LT&SR 1 Class.

== History ==
Six locomotives were built by Sharp, Stewart and Company in 1897, with a further six being built by Dübs and Company the following year. The LTSR numbered the locomotives 37–48 and named them after places in Essex, near the LTSR route. After the LTSR was absorbed by the Midland Railway in 1912, they were renumbered 2146–2157 and their names were removed. The Midland gave them the power classification 3P. All passed to the London, Midland and Scottish Railway in 1923 on grouping, and initially carried their MR number in LMS service. However, in 1930 they were renumbered 2135–46, and in 1947 were to be again renumbered 1953–64. This did not happen before nationalisation, so they were finally renumbered by British Railways directly to 41953–64. They were all withdrawn and scrapped between 1951 and 1952.

Four more locomotives of a similar class, the LT&SR 79 Class, were built in 1909.

== Accidents and incidents ==
- On 18 December 1931, a freight train became divided at Dagenham Dock station, Essex. Due to a signalman's error, a passenger train hauled by locomotive No. 2139 ran into the rear portion of the freight. Two people were killed and several were injured.

== List of locomotives ==
LTSR No.	LTSR Name	Builder	Built	MR No.	LMS 1923 No.	LMS 1930 No.	BR No.	Withdrawn
37	Woodgrange	SS 4245	1897	2146	2146	2135	41953	1951
38	Westcliff	SS 4246	1897	2147	2147	2136	41954	1951
39	Forest Gate	SS 4247	1897	2148	2148	2137	41955	1951
40	Benfleet	SS 4248	1897	2149	2149	2138	41956	1951
41	Leytonstone	SS 4249	1897	2150	2150	2139	41957	1951
42	East Horndon	SS 4250	1897	2151	2151	2140	41958	1951
43	Great Ilford	Dübs 3666	1898	2152	2152	2141	41959	1951
44	Prittlewell	Dübs 3667	1898	2153	2153	2142	41960	1951
45	Shoeburyness	Dübs 3668	1898	2154	2154	2143	41961	1952
46	Southchurch	Dübs 3669	1898	2155	2155	2144	41962	1951
47	Stratford	Dübs 3670	1898	2156	2156	2145	41963	1951
48	Little Ilford	Dübs 3671	1899	2157	2157	2146	41964	1951
