= Atlantic Coast Line 4-4-2 =

United States passenger steam locomotive class

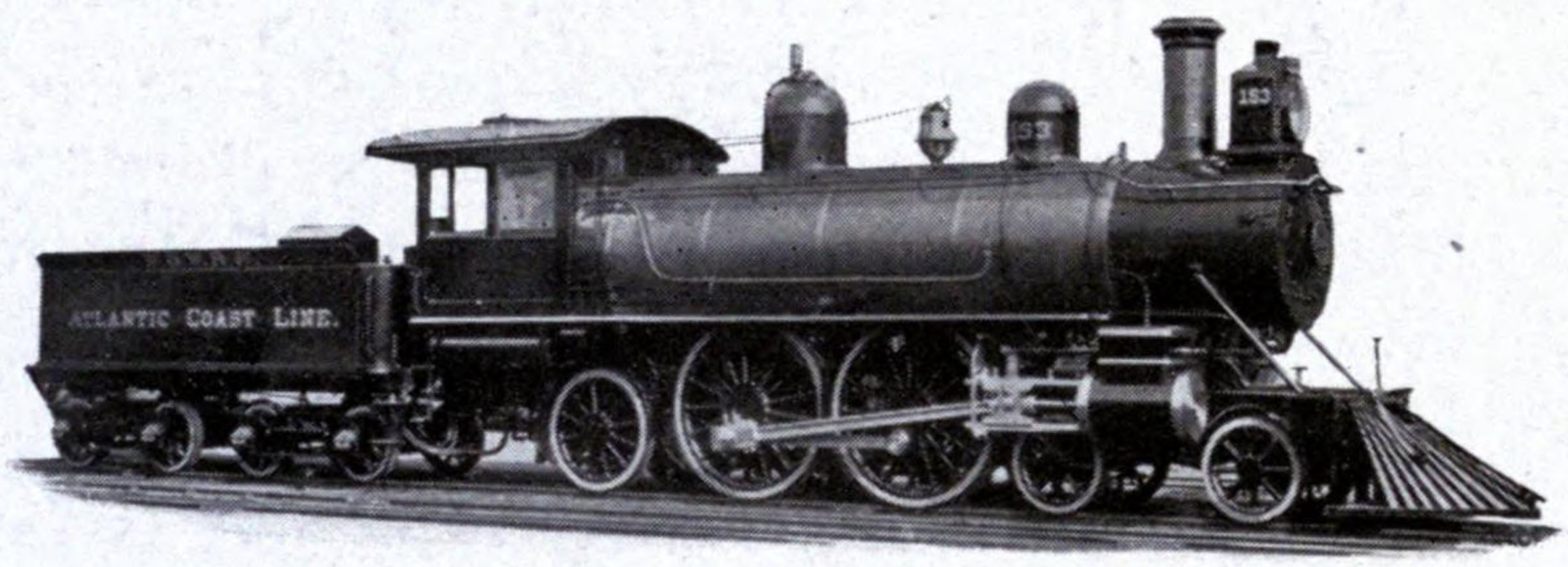
- Atlantic Coast Line 4-4-2 No. 153
Type and origin
- Power type: Steam
- Builder: Baldwin Locomotive Works
- Build date: 1894-1900
- Total produced: 14
Specifications
- Configuration
  - Whyte: 4-4-2
Career
- Operators: Atlantic Coast Line
- Nicknames: Atlantic Type
- Disposition: All scrapped

Atlantic Coast Line 4-4-2 were express passenger tender locomotives built by Baldwin Locomotive Works (at that time known as Burnham, Williams & Co), initially for the Atlantic Coast Line Railroad as classes I/I-2 and I-3. They were the first design in the world to exploit the larger boiler and firebox possible with a 4-4-2 design compared to the classic 4-4-0.

== Design and build ==
The advantages of the 4-4-2 design included a large boiler and a firebox of "desirable form" with "ample depth and width" which could be fitted over the rear frames, and this design for the first to exploit those features. There were also claimed of improved riding compared to some other types. The design specification called for the ability to haul a ten-coach train up a 32 foot grade (1% or 1 in 165) at 40 mph (64 km/h).

The initial batch of five were constructed in 1894/5. Further members classified as Class I/I-2 were built and the final two classified class I-3 were constructed in 1900.

== History ==
The class was introduced to the constituent companies operating the ACL brand from 1894-1895.

=== Legacy ===
The adoption of the name Atlantic for the class and subsequently the 4-4-2 wheelbase arrangement itself derives from name of the railroad they were supplied to. The advantages of the "Atlantic" type led to several other designs around the start of the twentieth century adopting the 4-4-2 wheelbase for express passenger work including the Milwaukee Road class A2, Pennsylvania Railroad class E1, as well as several railroads abroad for example the Lancashire and Yorkshire Railway Class 7 in the United Kingdom. Later in the Twentieth century preference moved to 4-6-0 for ten-wheeler locomotives despite the consequent difficulties in achieving an effective firebox design.
