= GNR Class C1 (small boiler) =

British 4-4-2 steam locomotive

Great Northern Railway small boiler class C1 London & North Eastern Railway class C2
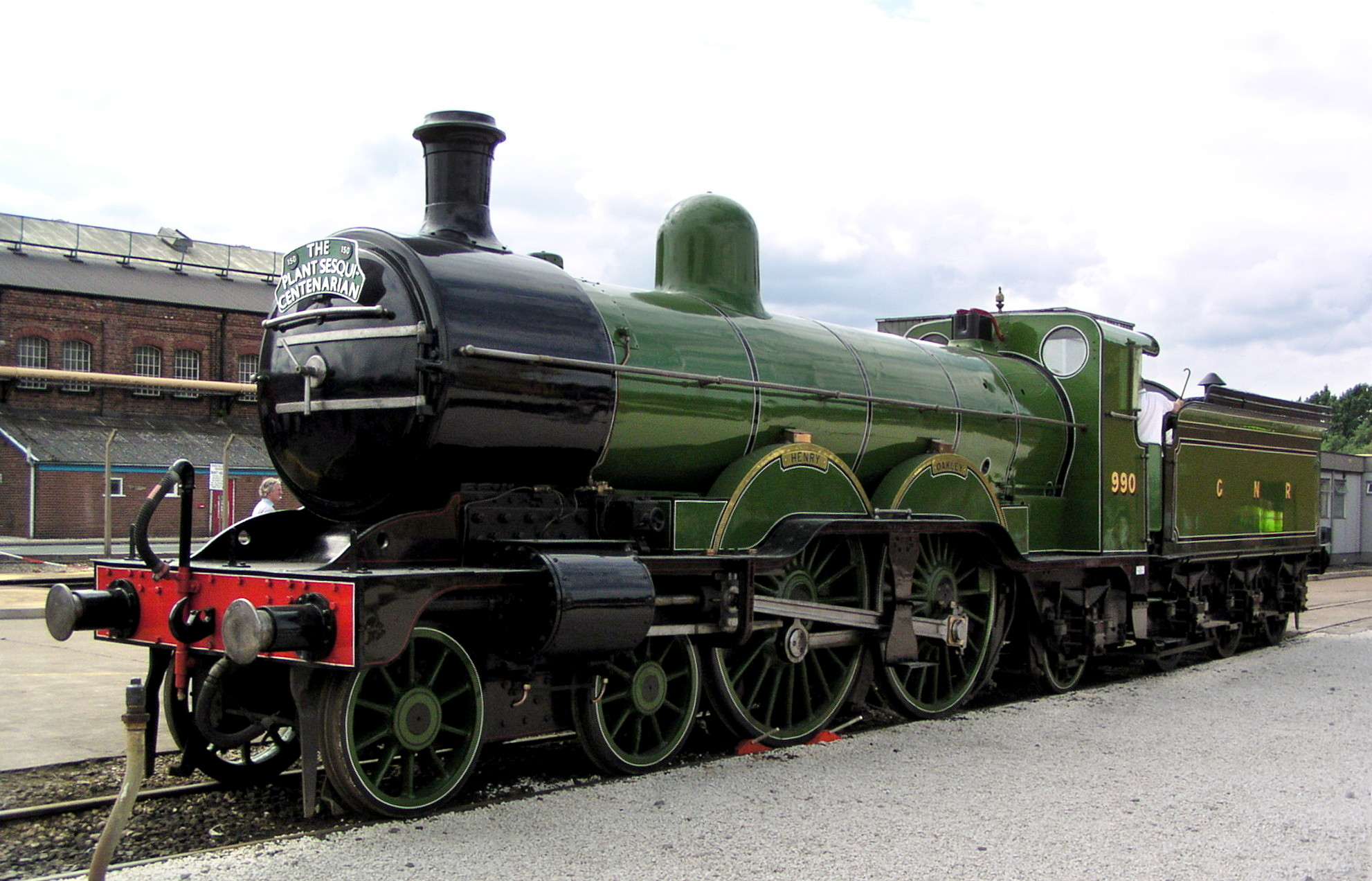
- The first Atlantic tender locomotive in Great Britain, 990 Henry Oakley is preserved at York.
Type and origin
- Power type: Steam
- Designer: Henry Ivatt
- Builder: Doncaster Works
- Serial number: 769, 872–881, 974, 996–1003, 1005–1006
- Build date: 1898–1903
- Total produced: 22
Specifications
- Configuration
  - Whyte: 4-4-2
  - UIC: 2′B1′n2s
- Gauge: 4 ft 8 1/2 in (1,435 mm) standard gauge
- Leading dia.: 3 ft 8 in (1.118 m)
- Driver dia.: 6 ft 8 in (2.032 m)
- Trailing dia.: 3 ft 8 in (1.118 m)
- Loco weight: 60.00 long tons (60.96 t; 67.20 short tons)
- Fuel type: Coal
- Water cap.: 3,670 imp gal (16,700 L; 4,410 US gal)
- Boiler pressure: 170 psi (1,200 kPa) (saturated); 160 psi (1,100 kPa) (superheated)
- Cylinders: Two, outside (3271: inside)
- Cylinder size: 18.75 in × 24 in (476 mm × 610 mm) (Saturated); 19 in × 24 in (483 mm × 610 mm) (Superheated)
- Valve gear: Stephenson
Performance figures
- Tractive effort: 15,240 lbf (67.8 kN) (Saturated); 14,728 lbf (65.5 kN) (Superheated)
Career
- Operators: Great Northern Railway; London and North Eastern Railway
- Numbers: GNR: 250, 252–260, 271, 949–950, 982–990
- Nicknames: Klondyke
- Withdrawn: 1935–1946
- Preserved: 990 Henry Oakley
- Disposition: One preserved, remainder scrapped

The Great Northern Railway (GNR) Small Boiler Class C1 is a class of steam locomotive, the first 4-4-2 or Atlantic type in Great Britain. They were designed by Henry Ivatt in 1897. In total 22 were built between 1898 and 1903 at Doncaster Works. The class were commonly known as 'Klondykes' [sic], after the 1897 Klondike gold rush. They could reach speeds of up to 90 mph (145 km/h). They were also known as Small Atlantics.

== History ==
The 4-4-2 wheel arrangement made its first appearance on a tender engine in 1888 in the United States of America. It was the natural development of the 4-4-0 the additional trailing truck not only supporting a larger firebox but improving the riding. Ten years later the GNR's Henry Ivatt introduced the Atlantic type engines to Britain.

Ivatt had the task of replacing Patrick Stirling at the head of the GNR's locomotive department. Stirling, who had died in office aged 75, was revered not only for the performance of his locomotives but for their looks as well. 'Artistry in metal' was one description of his work and considered Stirling Single to be the apotheosis of British locomotive aesthetics.

By the turn of the century, however, these single wheelers were being taxed by increasing train loadings on the East Coast Main Line. Seeking greater power and adhesion, Ivatt took the American route. He was not alone; his counterpart on the Lancashire and Yorkshire Railway, John Aspinall was also working on an Atlantic. Possibly to register a British first construction of the type, Ivatt's Atlantic was given a high priority by the GNR. Numbered No. 990 and named Henry Oakley after the general manager of the railway, it was outshopped from Doncaster works in 1898, beating Aspinall's prototype by a few months.

Like Churchward on the Great Western Railway, Ivatt placed great importance on the boiler design. On No. 990, he opted for a large capacity vessel and it was this extra steam raising capacity that gave the Atlantics the edge over Stirling's single wheelers. The first production Atlantics entered service in 1900 and proved fast, lively runners. Their speed proved to be a hindrance on the line between London and Doncaster, which was not designed for such fast trains. In their turn, the enginemen would have told Ivatt that the cylinders were not powerful enough for the boiler. These first Atlantics had to be worked at undesirable and uneconomic rates to achieve the expected performance; Ivatt attempted to rectify this by fitting superheaters, starting with 988 with the Schmidt variety in 1909. From 1914 until 1925, the remaining engines were fitted with Robinson superheaters. In line with contemporary thinking, when fitted with superheaters, the boiler pressure was reduced from 170 to 160 psi (1,200 to 1,100 kPa), while the cylinders were bored to 19 in (480 mm) to compensate. Following on from this success Ivatt built the large boiler GNR Class C1.

== LNER ownership ==
After the 1923 grouping this class became London and North Eastern Railway (LNER) Class C2, whereas the large boiler engines were LNER Class C1. GNR's own Class C2 Atlantic tank locomotives became LNER Class C12.

== Preservation ==
Only one of the small boiler C1 class has survived into preservation and it was the very first. No. 990 Henry Oakley is preserved as part of the National Collection. Although operated since preservation, it is, as of January 2025 on static display at the National Railway Museum, York.
