= Henry Oakley =

British railway administrator (1823–1912)

Sir Henry Oakley
- Born: 12 November 1823; Marylebone, London, England
- Died: 8 February 1912 (aged 88); St Pancras, London, England
- Occupation: Railway administrator

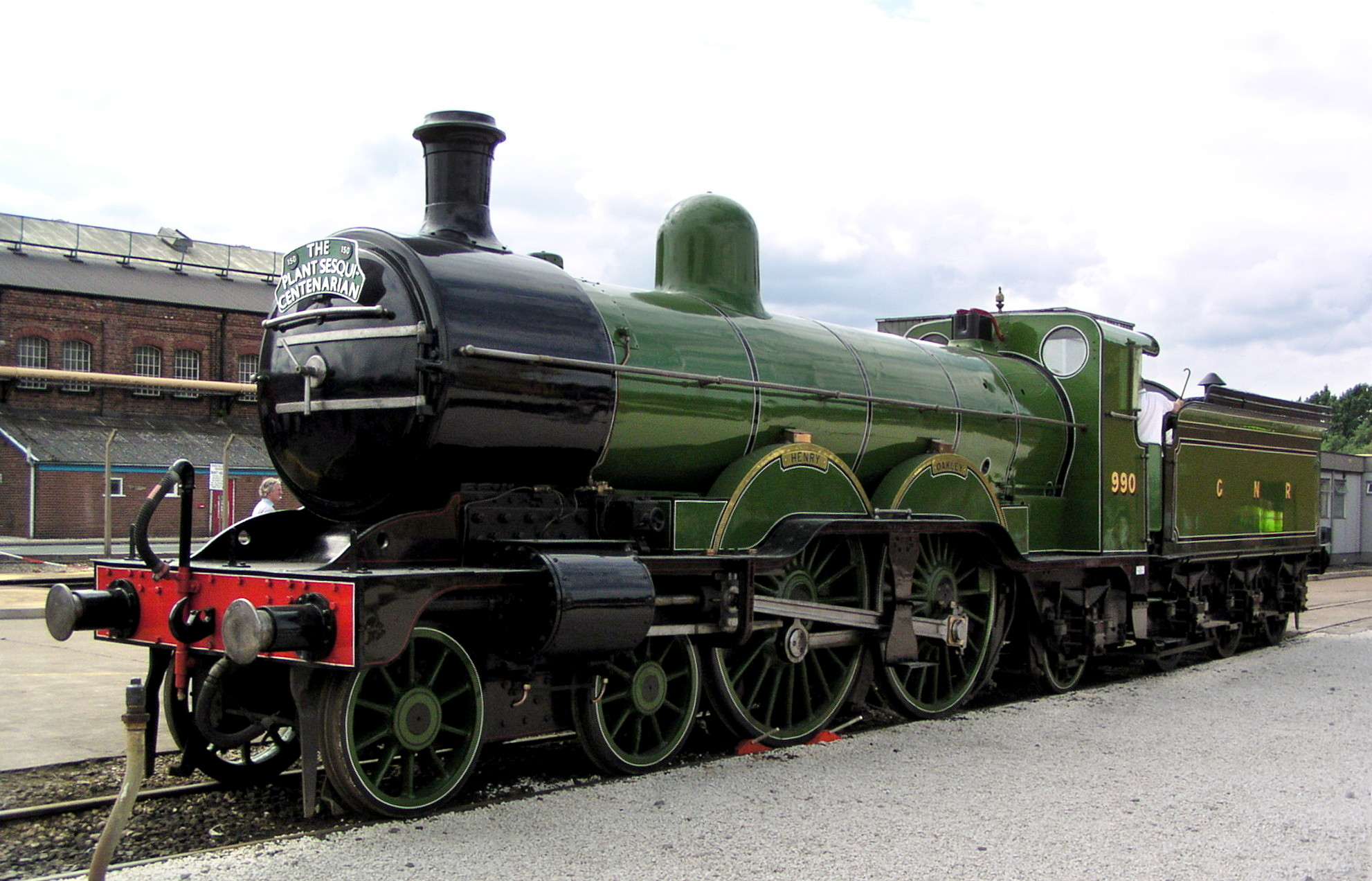
GNR no. 990, the locomotive named after Henry Oakley

Sir Henry Oakley (12 November 1823 – 8 February 1912) was a British railway administrator. He started life as a clerk in the House of Commons Library, and joined the Great Northern Railway (GNR) in the same capacity in 1850. He was chief clerk in the Company Secretary's office until taking over as Secretary in 1858. He became General Manager of the company in 1870.

He proved adept at the politics and negotiations required in railway management, and had taken on an additional role as Honorary Secretary of the Railway Companies' Association by 1873. He retained these extra duties until the Association was restructured on a more permanent basis in 1900.

Oakley was elected to the GNR board in 1897 and retired as General Manager in 1898. In June 1900, a C1 class locomotive was named in his honour by the company; after its withdrawal from service in 1937 it was preserved, and survives at the National Railway Museum. After leaving the GNR he became Chairman of the Central London Railway, one of the new tube railways.

In 1891 he was dubbed Knight Bachelor at Osborne House, Isle of Wight.

Oakley died on 8 February 1912 at 37 Chester Terrace, St Pancras, London aged 88.

== Family ==
On 9 August 1849 Oakley married Fanny Eliza Catherine Thompson, daughter of Frederic Francis Thompson of the H.E.I.C. and his wife Caroline (née Callander) at the parish church of St. Luke's, Chelsea. Fanny died aged 33 in 1858. They had five children:

1. Herbert Frederick Oakley (1850–1888) m. Emma Sarah Cave
2. Harry Callander Oakley (1854–1900), LRCS, LRCP Edin; m. Mary Barnard
3. Adam Robert Hamilton Oakley (1856–1925) m. Ellen Judith Cripps
4. Tom Edmund Livingston Oakley (1858–1932) m. Frances Emily Cripps
5. Fanny Caroline Elizabeth Oakley (1858–1932) Unmarried

== Sources ==
- Alderman, Geoffrey, The railway interest, Leicester, Leicester University Press, 1973, ISBN 0-7185-1111-5
- Groves, Norman (1990). Great Northern Locomotive History: Volume 3a 1896-1911 The Ivatt Era. Lincoln: RCTS. ISBN 0-901115-69-X.
- Harris, Michael, 'Oakley, Henry (1823–1914)' in Simmons, Jack and Biddle, Gordon (eds), The Oxford companion to British Railway history: from 1603 to the 1990s, Oxford, New York: OUP, 1997, ISBN 0-19-211697-5, page 356
