= Doncaster Works =

Railway Engineering Works

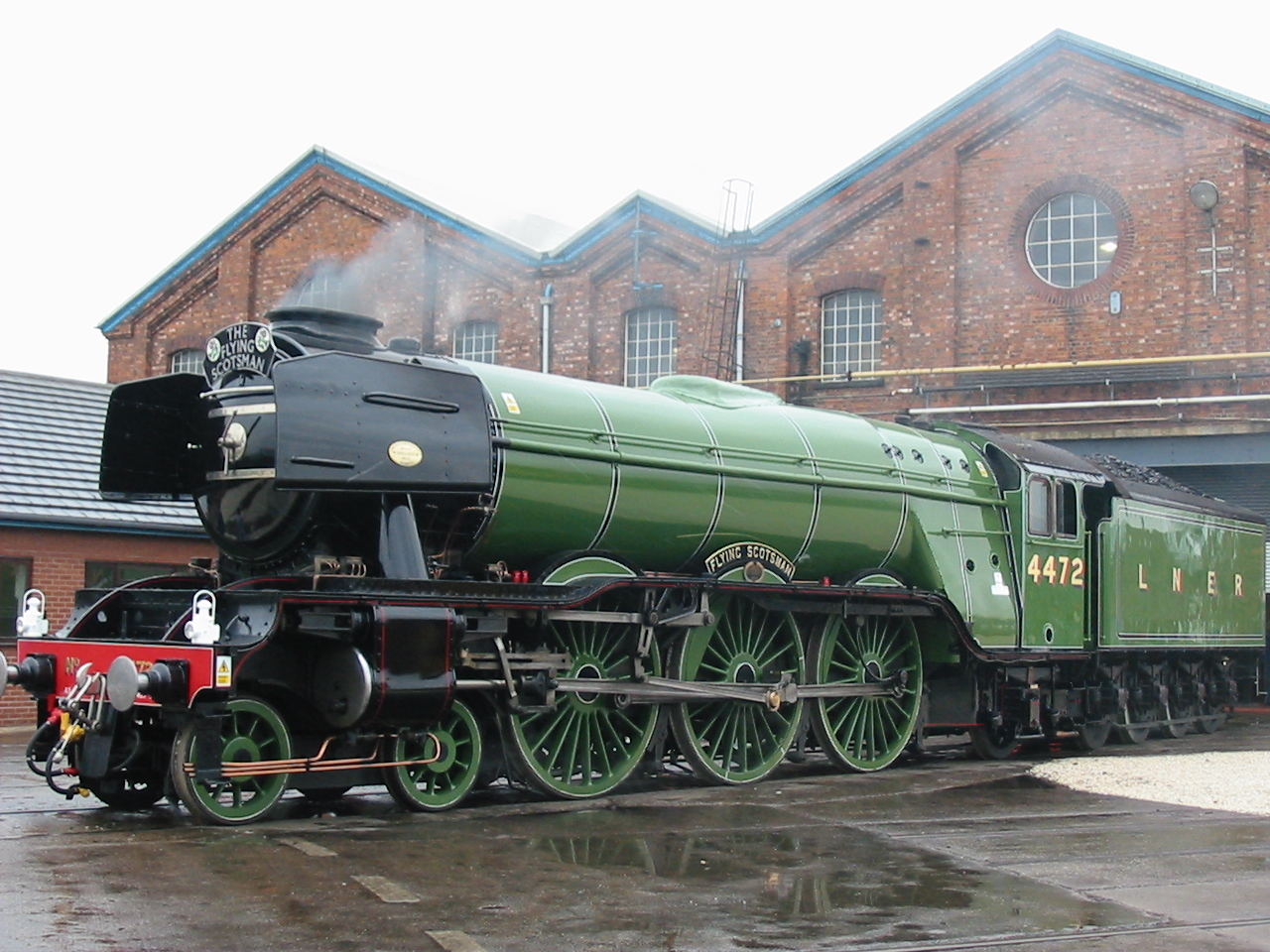
Flying Scotsman at Doncaster Works in July 2003

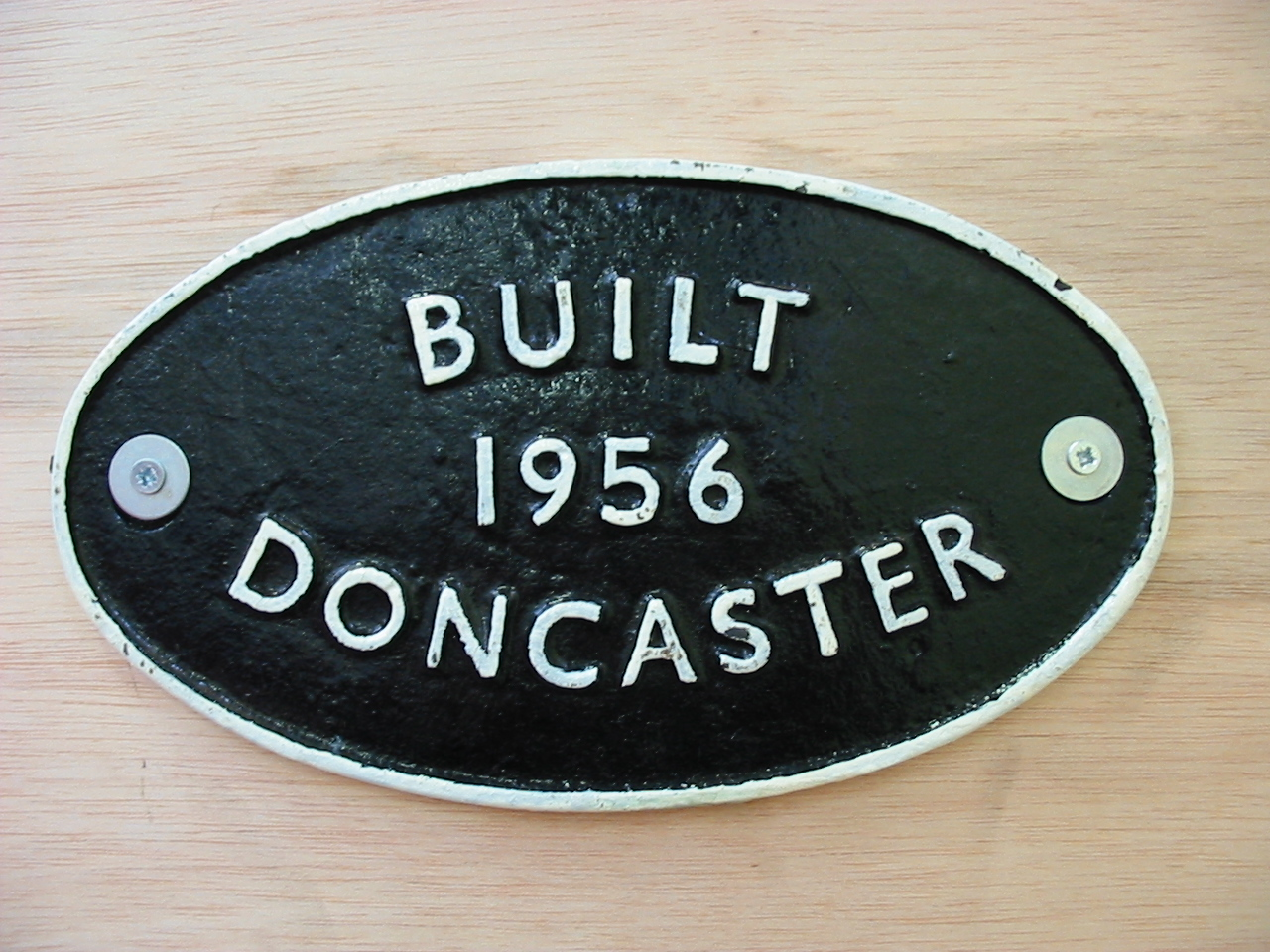
Doncaster works plate

Doncaster Railway Works is a railway workshop located in Doncaster, England.

Also referred to as The Plant, it was established by the Great Northern Railway in 1853, replacing the previous works in Boston and Peterborough. Until 1867 it undertook only repairs and maintenance. Today the remaining part is operated by Wabtec.

== History ==
In 1866, Patrick Stirling was appointed as Locomotive Superintendent, and the first of the 875 class was built in 1886. At this time the works also began building new coaches: in 1873 the first sleeping cars; in 1879 the first dining cars in the United Kingdom; and in 1882 the first corridor coaches. In 1891, 99 locomotives, 181 carriages and 1,493 wagons were built.

In 1889 a separate building for carriages was opened and wagon construction ceased at Doncaster in 1890, and by 1913 all of the work relating to coaches was concentrated in three buildings including a construction facility with 12 roads.

Among the locomotives the works produced were the Stirling Singles, the Ivatt Atlantics and the Gresley Pacifics, including the world-famous Flying Scotsman, the first locomotive to achieve 100 mph (Note: There was a previous claim of a British locomotive reaching 100 mph, and even over 90 years later the competing claims can still produce heated debate. More information can be found at GWR 3700 Class 3440 City of Truro#Speed record) and also run from London King's Cross to Edinburgh Waverley non-stop; and Mallard which achieved the top speed of 126 mph on 3 July 1938 to become the world's fastest steam locomotive, a record that she still holds to the present day. These have hauled such trains as the Flying Scotsman, Silver Jubilee, Coronation and the Elizabethan. Doncaster also constructed the carriages for the last of these.

In 1913 "The Plant" employed 4,600 and covered 200 acres (81 ha) and from the time of the Great Northern Railway into LNER days the works continued to build a variety of locomotives and rolling stock. During World War II like other workshops it joined in the war effort producing, among other things, Horsa gliders. The carriage building shop was destroyed by fire in 1940. New buildings in 1949 were designed with the British Railways Mark 1 all-steel carriages in mind.

In 1957, BR Standard Class 4 76114, the last of 2,228 steam locomotives, was completed. In November 1963 60009 Union of South Africa was the last of an estimated 10,000 steam locomotives to be overhauled at Doncaster Works. Carriage building finished in 1962, but the works was modernised with the addition of a diesel locomotive repair shop. Under British Rail Engineering Limited, new diesel shunters and 25 kV electric locomotives were built, plus Class 56 and Class 58 diesel-electric locomotives.

In October 1987, the wagon works was sold by the British Rail Board to RFS Industries in a management buyout. In 1998 RFS Industries was purchased by Westinghouse Air Brake Company and in March 2000 rebranded Wabtec.

In 2007, Bombardier Transportation closed its part of the works. In early 2008 the main locomotive repair shop which was built on the Crimpsall was demolished to make way for housing. Wabtec continues to conduct carriage refurbishment at the Doncaster site.

== See also ==
- Listed buildings in Doncaster (Town Ward)
