= Henry Ivatt =

British locomotive designer (1851–1923)

Henry Alfred Ivatt
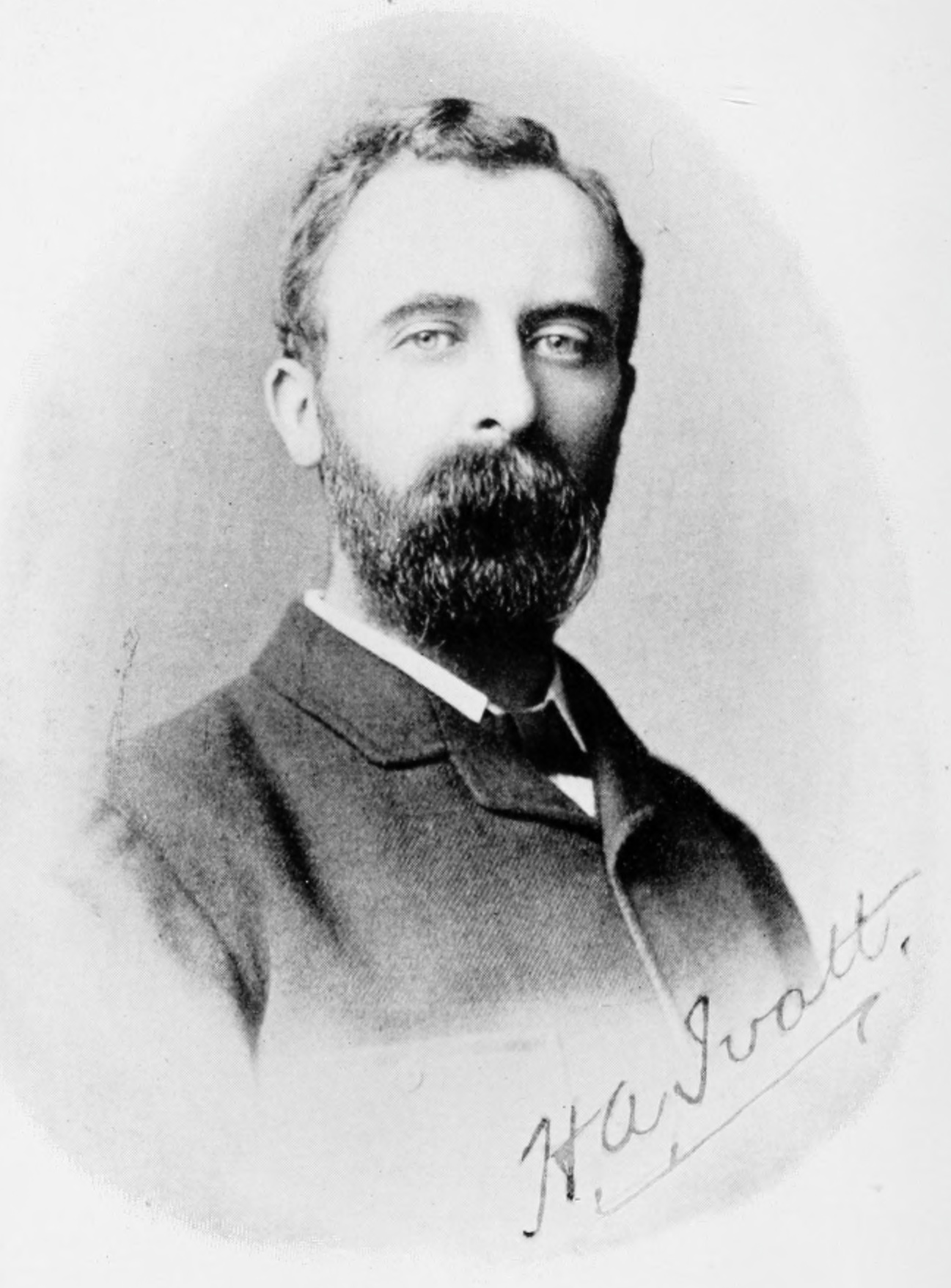
- Born: 16 September 1851; Wentworth, Cambridgeshire, England
- Died: 25 October 1923 (aged 72); Haywards Heath, Sussex, England
- Education: Liverpool College
- Engineering career
- Discipline: Locomotive engineering

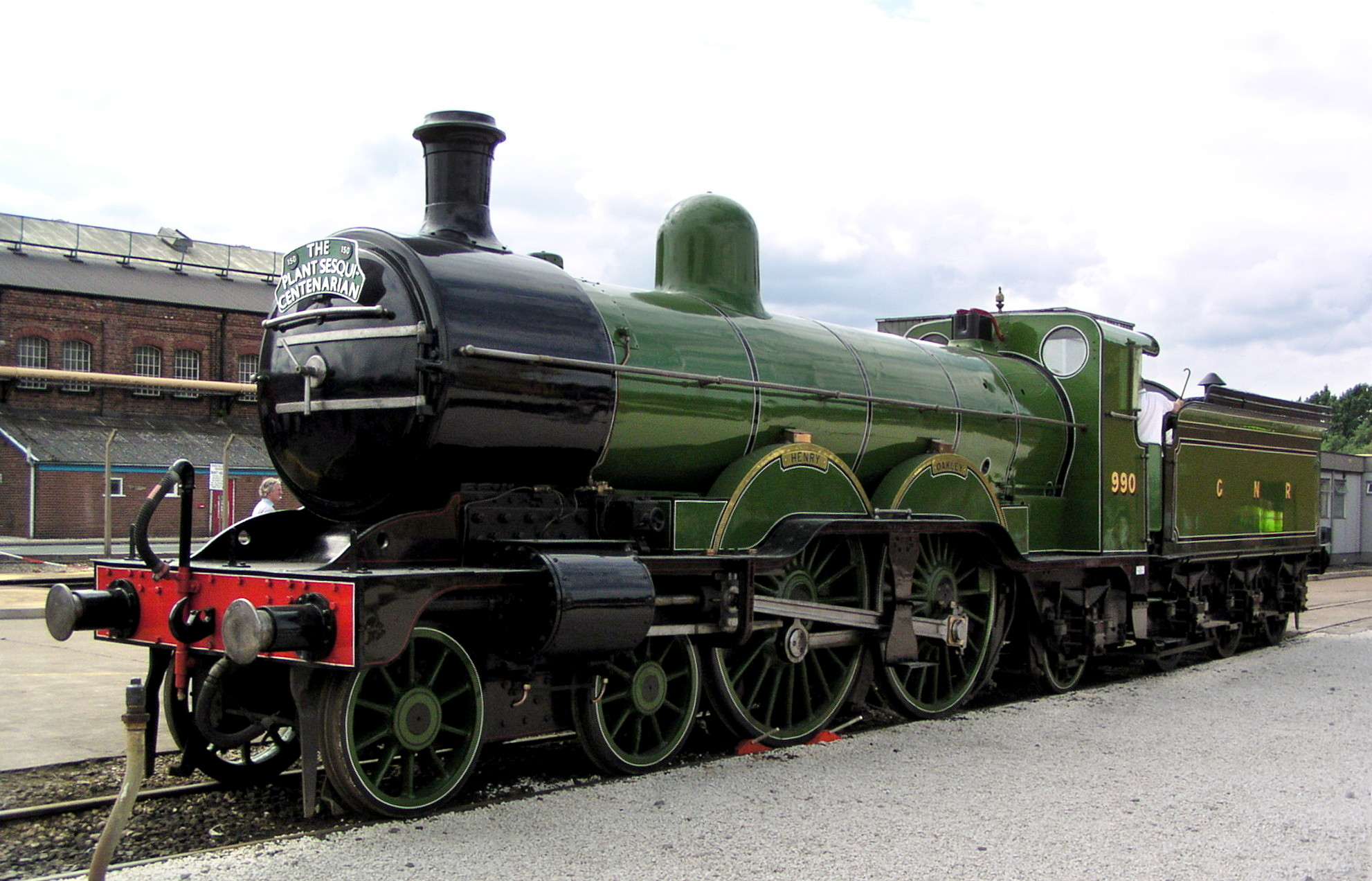
The first Atlantic locomotive in Great Britain, 990 Henry Oakley is preserved at York. It was designed by Henry Ivatt in 1897

Henry Alfred Ivatt (16 September 1851, Wentworth, Cambridgeshire – 25 October 1923) was an English railway engineer, and was the Chief Mechanical Engineer of the Great Northern Railway from 1896 to 1911.

== Career ==
=== London and North Western Railway ===
Educated at Liverpool College., at age 17, Ivatt was apprenticed to John Ramsbottom at the Crewe Works of the London and North Western Railway (LNWR). He worked as a fireman for six months and held various positions there. He was made head of the Holyhead Locomotive Depot in 1874, before being promoted to the head of the Chester District.

=== Great Southern and Western Railway ===
In 1877, Ivatt moved to Ireland, and the Great Southern and Western Railway at Inchicore. In 1882, he was appointed to the post of locomotive engineer there, where he patented a design for a sprung flap for vertically opening carriage windows that became ubiquitous.

=== Great Northern Railway ===
In 1895, Ivatt returned to England and was appointed Locomotive Superintendent of the Great Northern Railway (GNR), succeeding Patrick Stirling, with references from Samuel Waite Johnson, John Aspinall, Francis William Webb and William Dean.

=== Locomotive designs ===
At the GNR, he became associated with the GNR Class C1 (small boiler) and GNR Class C1 (large boiler) 4-4-2 (Atlantic) type, which he introduced to Britain. Ivatt was also the first to introduce Walschaerts valve gear to Britain. Ivatt retired on 2 December 1911. He was succeeded as Chief Mechanical Engineer (CME) of the GNR by Nigel Gresley.

== Family ==
He had six children, the first of whom, Campbell, died as a child in 1898. His son George Ivatt was also a locomotive engineer and post-war CME of the London Midland and Scottish Railway. His daughter Marjorie married Oliver Bulleid, CME of the Southern Railway (Great Britain).

== Death ==
Ivatt died in 1923 in Haywards Heath, Sussex.

Preceded by Patrick Stirling	Chief Mechanical Engineer of Great Northern Railway; 1896 – 1911	Succeeded by Nigel Gresley
