= J38 =

J38 may refer to:

- Elongated pentagonal orthobicupola, a Johnson solid (J_{38})
- HMS Caraquet (J38), a Bangor-class minesweeper of the Royal Navy
- HMS Skipjack (J38), a Halcyon-class minesweeper of the Royal Navy
- LNER Class J38, a British steam locomotive class
- West Engineering XJ38, an early jet engine
- J-38, a model of telegraph key
