= LNER Class D49 =

British steam locomotive class (1927–1961)

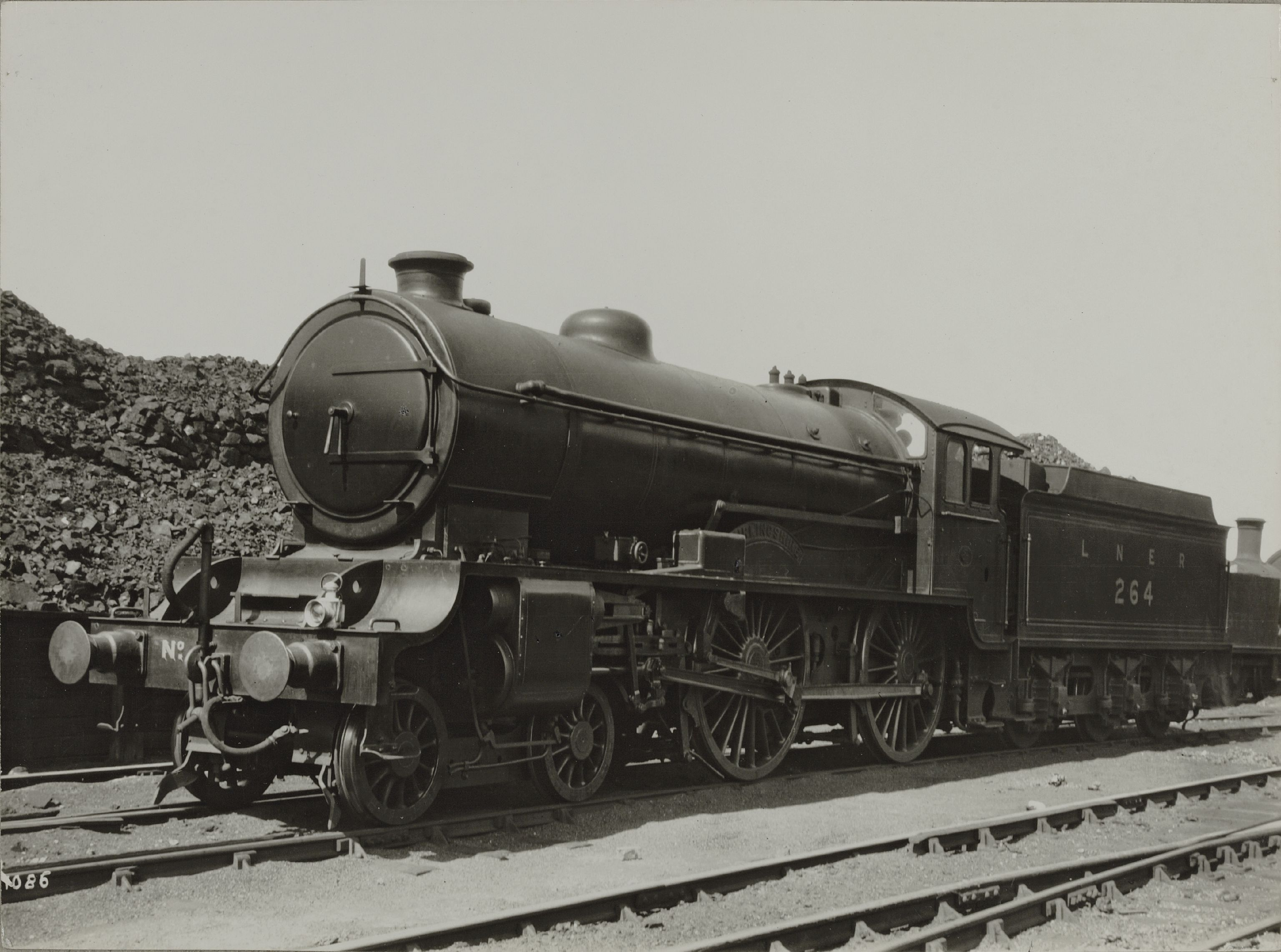
- LNER 264 Stirlingshire
Type and origin
- Power type: Steam
- Designer: Nigel Gresley
- Builder: LNER Darlington Works
- Build date: 1927–1935
- Total produced: 76
Specifications
- Configuration
  - Whyte: 4-4-0
  - UIC: 2′B h3
- Gauge: 4 ft 8 1/2 in (1,435 mm) standard gauge
- Leading dia.: 3 ft 1 1/4 in (0.946 m)
- Driver dia.: 6 ft 8 in (2.032 m)
- Length: 58 ft 8.75 in (17.901 m)
- Width: 8 ft 7 in (2.616 m)
- Height: 13 ft 0 in (3.96 m)
- Axle load: 21.25 long tons (21.59 t; 23.80 short tons)
- Adhesive weight: 42.00 long tons (42.67 t; 47.04 short tons)
- Loco weight: 65.11 long tons (66.15 t; 72.92 short tons)
- Tender weight: 52.65 long tons (53.49 t; 58.97 short tons)
- Fuel type: Coal
- Firebox
  - Grate area: 26 square feet (2.4 m^{2})
- Boiler: LNER Diagram 97
- Boiler pressure: 180 psi (1.24 MPa)
- Heating surface
  - Firebox: 171.5 square feet (15.93 m^{2})
  - Tubes: 871.75 square feet (80.988 m^{2})
  - Flues: 354.53 square feet (32.937 m^{2})
- Superheater
  - Heating area: 271.8 square feet (25.25 m^{2})
- Cylinders: Three
- Cylinder size: 17 in × 26 in (432 mm × 660 mm)
- Valve gear: see text
Performance figures
- Tractive effort: 21,556 lbf (95.9 kN)
Career
- Operators: London and North Eastern Railway » British Railways
- Power class: BR: 4P
- Axle load class: Route availability 8
- Locale: North Eastern Region
- Withdrawn: 1957–1961
- Disposition: One preserved, remainder scrapped

The London and North Eastern Railway (LNER) D49 Class is a class of 4-4-0 steam locomotives designed by Nigel Gresley. They were named after fox hunts and shires.

One, 246/62712 Morayshire has been preserved on the Bo'ness and Kinneil Railway.

== Construction and development ==
All 76 of the Class D49 locomotives were built at Darlington Works and when new had three cylinders: one mounted centrally below the smokebox and above the bogie pivot, the other two mounted outside the frames in line with the inside cylinder. The valves varied, as did the arrangements for operating them.

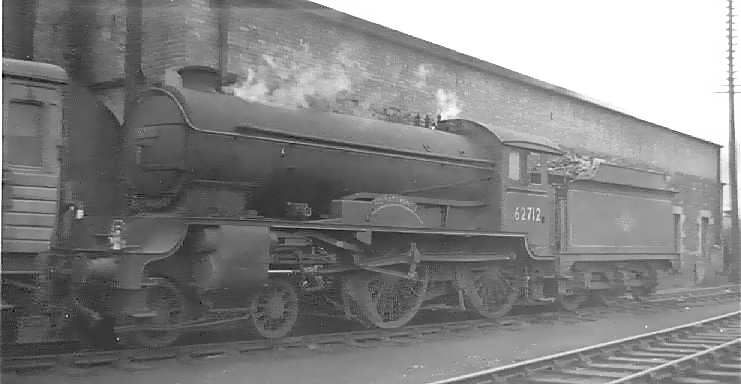
D49/1 no. 62712 Morayshire with Walschaerts valve gear and piston valves

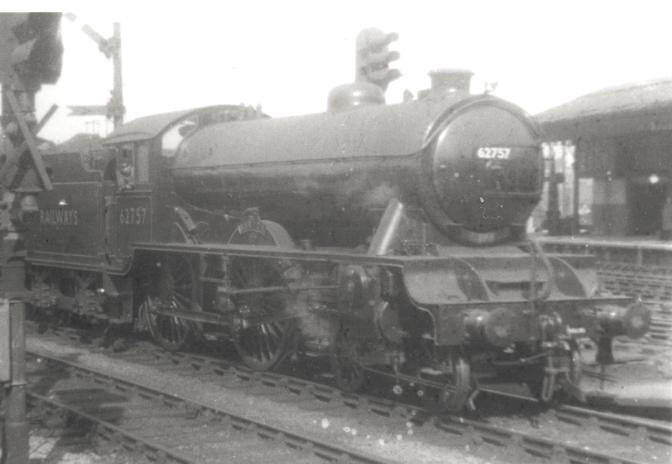
D49/2 no. 62757 The Burton with rotary cam poppet valves

The first order for 28 locomotives was placed in April 1926. Within this order, there were three variants. The first twenty, built in 1927–28, used piston valves operated by the valve gear arrangement that was typical of Gresley's three-cylinder designs produced since 1920, that is, the valves of the outside cylinders were operated directly by Walschaerts valve gear, whereas the valve of the inside cylinder was operated indirectly from the outside valves by means of Gresley conjugated valve gear. The next six, built in 1928, were fitted with Lentz oscillating-cam poppet valves, also operated by Walschaerts valve gear for the outside cylinders and Gresley conjugated valve gear for the inside cylinder, although the components and their layout differed from the piston valve locomotives. The last two, built in 1929, also had Lentz poppet valves but in this case the cams rotated in one direction, the camshaft being driven from the leading right-hand driving wheel by means of two pairs of bevel gears and a longitudinal shaft on the outside of the wheels. The cams provided five cutoff settings for forwards running.

Before the eight poppet-valve locomotives had been built, a further order was placed in February 1928 for eight more piston-valve locomotives, which were built in 1929. Trials with the two rotary-cam locomotives during 1929 persuaded Gresley to use this arrangement for subsequent orders: fifteen ordered in December 1929 were built in 1932–33, again using five-step cams; and 25 ordered in October 1933 were built during 1934–35, having seven-step cams. Tests were also conducted on a form of infinitely-variable stepless cam.

During 1938, the six oscillating-cam locomotives were rebuilt with piston valves. In 1942, one of the rotary-cam locomotives, no. 365, upon which some of the trials with the stepless cams had been conducted, was rebuilt by Edward Thompson with two inside cylinders and Stephenson valve gear for the piston valves.

== Tenders ==
When new, all were provided with LNER Group Standard (G.S.) 4,200-gallon tenders (a type of which more than a thousand were produced between 1924 and 1952) having a water capacity of 4,200 imperial gallons (19,000 L), a coal capacity of 7 long tons 8 hundredweight (8.3 short tons; 7.5 t) and a wheelbase of 13 feet 6 inches (4.11 m); all were equipped with water scoops. Not all of these tenders were new: although 76 new tenders were built with the 76 new locomotives, the fifteen locomotives built in 1932–33 were given secondhand G.S. 4,200-gallon tenders built in 1926 taken from class J38, which received fifteen new G.S. 3,500-gallon tenders (lacking water scoops) in exchange. This was done because the J38s were used in Scotland, where there were no water troughs on the LNER system; and the larger capacity was not needed for the short journeys that the J38s usually worked, so the larger tenders (with scoops) could be more usefully employed with the D49s.

The tenders built for the first 28 D49s had a stepped coping – the tops of the bodysides were wider than the tank body, and the fifteen tenders taken from class J38 were similar. The eight new tenders built for the D49s in 1929 were of a new flush-sided design: the body sides were straight for the full height, although the capacities were the same as the stepped-coping type; and the 25 built in 1934–35 were also of the flush-sided type.

By the late 1930s it was realised that the water scoops of the D49s were largely unnecessary: the 23 based in Scotland never used them, whilst the remainder of the class were all based in the North Eastern Area, which had just two sets of water troughs: at Wiske Moor, north of Northallerton; and at Lucker, both being on the East Coast Main Line, a route not used by the majority of D49 workings. Accordingly, during 1938, seven of the North Eastern Area D49s (five of which were being rebuilt at the time from oscillating-cam poppet valves to having piston valves) were given secondhand North Eastern Railway tenders taken from class Q6, the G.S. tenders going to new class V2 locomotives. In 1941–42, a steel shortage meant that 25 new class O2 locomotives were built without tenders, receiving G.S. tenders from class D49, which were given secondhand Great Central Railway (GCR) tenders in replacement, which were spare at the time due either to withdrawals or the rebuilding of class Q4 to class Q1. Three more D49s also had their G.S. tenders replaced with ex-GCR tenders at the same time, the tenders released going to class K3 locomotives. Following these changes, all of the Scottish Area D49s and twelve of the North Eastern Area D49s (including all of the piston-valve locomotives) then had secondhand pre-grouping tenders, all of which were without water scoops. After 1942, further occasional tender changes occurred, and some locomotives returned to having the G.S. type.

Summary of class D49 tenders
Type	Water capacity	Coal capacity	Wheelbase	Water scoops	First used on D49
LNER Group Standard	4,200 imp gal (19,000 L)	7 long tons 8 cwt (8.3 short tons; 7.5 t)	13 ft 6 in (4.11 m)	Yes	1927
ex-North Eastern Railway	4,125 imp gal (18,750 L)	5 long tons 10 cwt (6.2 short tons; 5.6 t)	12 ft 8 in (3.86 m)	No	1938
ex-Great Central Railway	4,000 imp gal (18,000 L)	6 long tons 0 cwt (6.7 short tons; 6.1 t)	13 ft 0 in (3.96 m)	No	1941

== Sub-classes ==
- D49/1 Introduced 1927 with Walschaerts valve gear for the outside cylinders, Gresley conjugated valve gear for the inside cylinder, with 8-inch (203 mm) piston valves
- D49/2 Introduced 1929 with Lentz rotary-cam poppet valves
- D49/3 Introduced 1928 with Lentz oscillating-cam poppet valves
- D class Introduced 1941 with Stephenson valve gear and 8-inch (203 mm) piston valves

== Names and numbers ==
The original LNER numbers for the first order (for 28 locomotives) were selected from numbers that were blank due to the previous withdrawal of old locomotives, and they were scattered between 234 and 352. The next order (for eight) were given the block 2753–60, which had not previously been used. The last two orders (totalling forty) again took blank numbers, this time scattered between 201 and 377.

Names for the first 28 locomotives were chosen from counties through which LNER-owned lines ran, and whose names ended with -shire. English counties were used for locomotives based in North Eastern England, whilst Scottish counties were used for those based in Scotland. The next eight also took county names but the rules were relaxed - some names ended -land, some were counties without LNER lines (but which were served by LNER trains), and most were English counties even though all eight were for use in Scotland. The final forty, all of which had rotary-cam poppet valves, were given the names of fox hunts in England, mostly in areas served by the LNER; they were for use in North Eastern England. Since the names fell into two distinct groups which largely corresponded with the two types of valve gear, the unofficial class names of "Shires" (for those with Walschaerts valve gear) and "Hunts" (rotary cam) came to be used, and this theme was strengthened when the two locomotives having rotary cam valve gear but shire names were given hunt names during 1932, with no. 352 Leicestershire becoming The Meynell, and no. 336 Buckinghamshire becoming The Quorn.

During 1946 and early 1947, the LNER renumbered its entire fleet, bringing classes into continuously-numbered blocks, and class D49 was renumbered 2700–2775 in approximate order of construction. Some of these numbers were already in use by class D49 – old nos. 2753–60 became 2728–35, these all had "shire" names; whereas eight locomotives whose old numbers were scattered between 217 and 279 took the vacated nos. 2753–60, these all had "hunt" names. At the start of 1948, the whole class was inherited by British Railways (BR), which (pending a general renumbering scheme) prefixed some ex-LNER locomotive numbers with the letter E; five of these were class D49, so no. 2713 became E2713. Later in 1948 a comprehensive renumbering scheme was devised and put into effect, under which the final LNER numbers were increased by 60000, class D49 becoming 62700–75, and this was completed during 1950.

== Accidents and incidents ==
- On 3 January 1931, locomotive No. 2758 Northumberland was hauling a passenger train that was derailed at Carlisle, Cumberland due to excessive speed through a curve. Three people were killed.
- On 16 August 1952 the single D class locomotive No. 62768 The Morpeth was involved in a collision between a light engine and a passenger train at Dragon Junction near Starbeck. The other two locomotives involved were also ex-LNER D49s. No.62758 The Cattistock and the other D49 were repaired after the accident but The Morpeth sustained substantial damage and was withdrawn and scrapped that same year. The Cattistock’s tender was damaged, so it and The Morpeth’s undamaged tender were swapped.
- In July 1958, locomotive No. 62703 Hertfordshire ran into the turntable pit at Bridlington, Yorkshire and rolled onto its side.

== Preservation ==
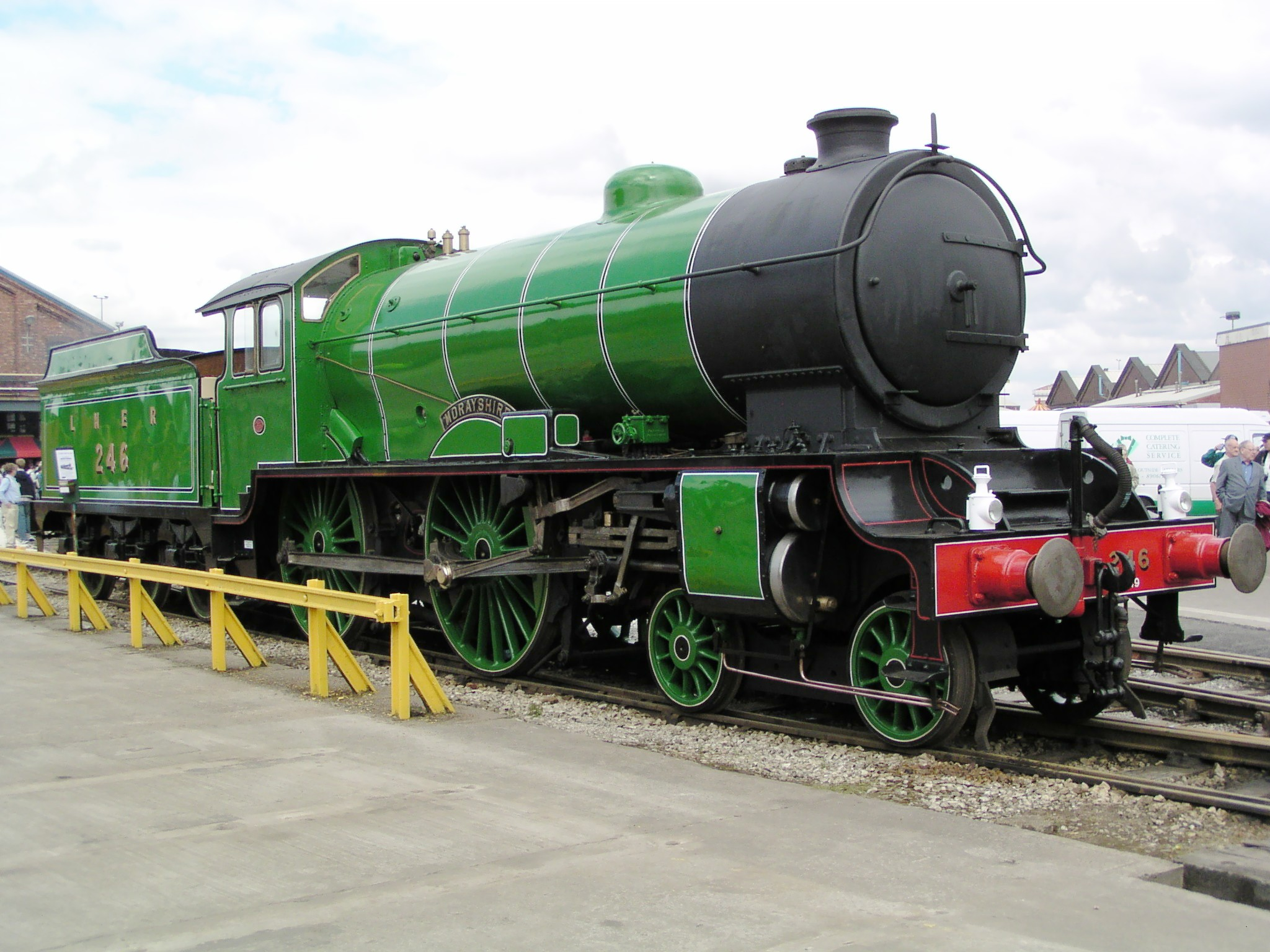
Preserved D49 class no. 246 Morayshire at Doncaster Works

British Railways no. 62712 Morayshire was the last of the class to be withdrawn from service, this occurring on 3 July 1961. Since March 1961 it had been used as a stationary boiler in Slateford, and continued in this role until January 1962. After this it was stored, first at Dalry Road locomotive depot, and from September 1963 at Dawsholm depot. In July 1964, it was purchased by Ian Fraser who had it overhauled at Inverurie Locomotive Works in January 1965, during which it was repainted in LNER green livery, with its original number 246 (which it had carried until November 1946). The locomotive was not restored to original condition: it had screw reverse (which replaced the steam reverse in June 1929); it lacked a Westinghouse brake pump (removed in December 1930); and it had an ex-Great Central Railway tender (which replaced the LNER tender in June 1941); and there were other minor differences. As of April 2018 it is based on the Bo'ness and Kinneil Railway.
