= Booster engine =

Extra cylinders on a steam locomotive

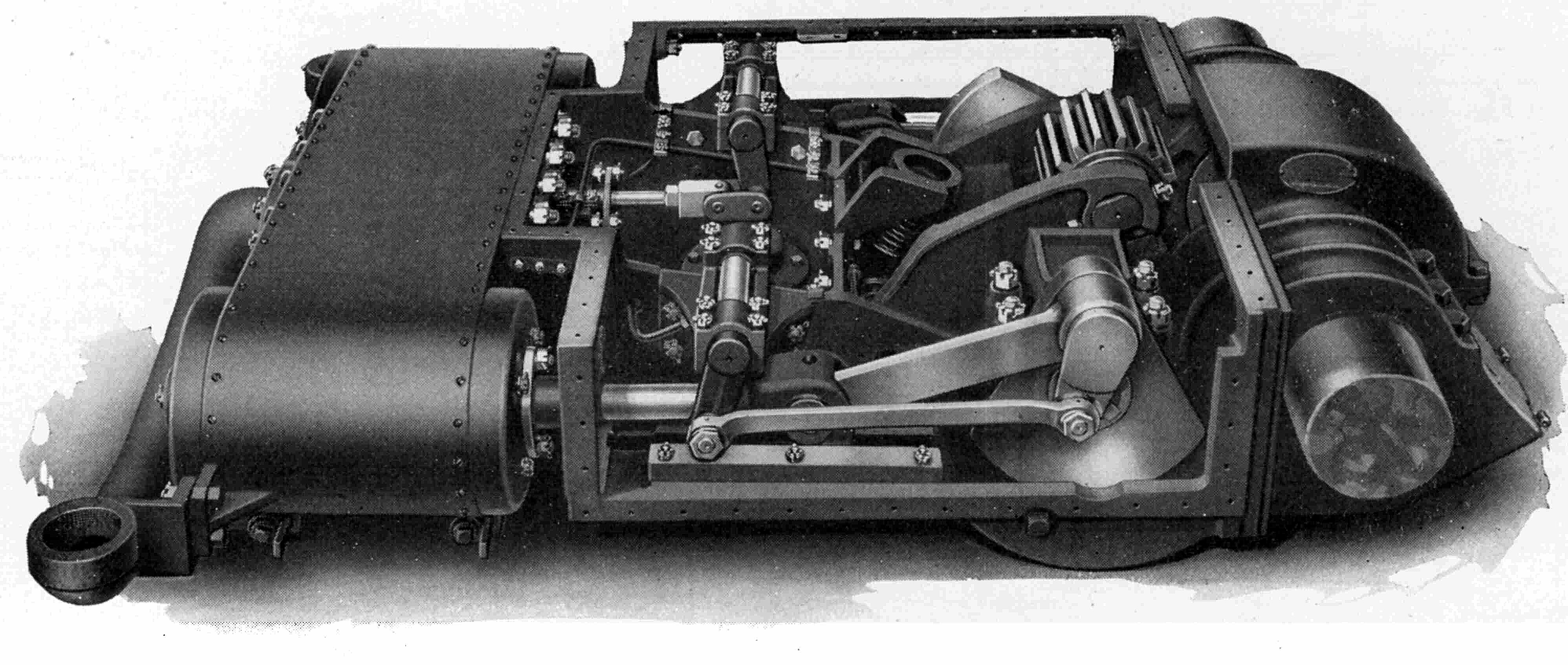
Booster engine with the cover removed to show the mechanism. The driven axle is on the right; the booster normally hangs behind it.

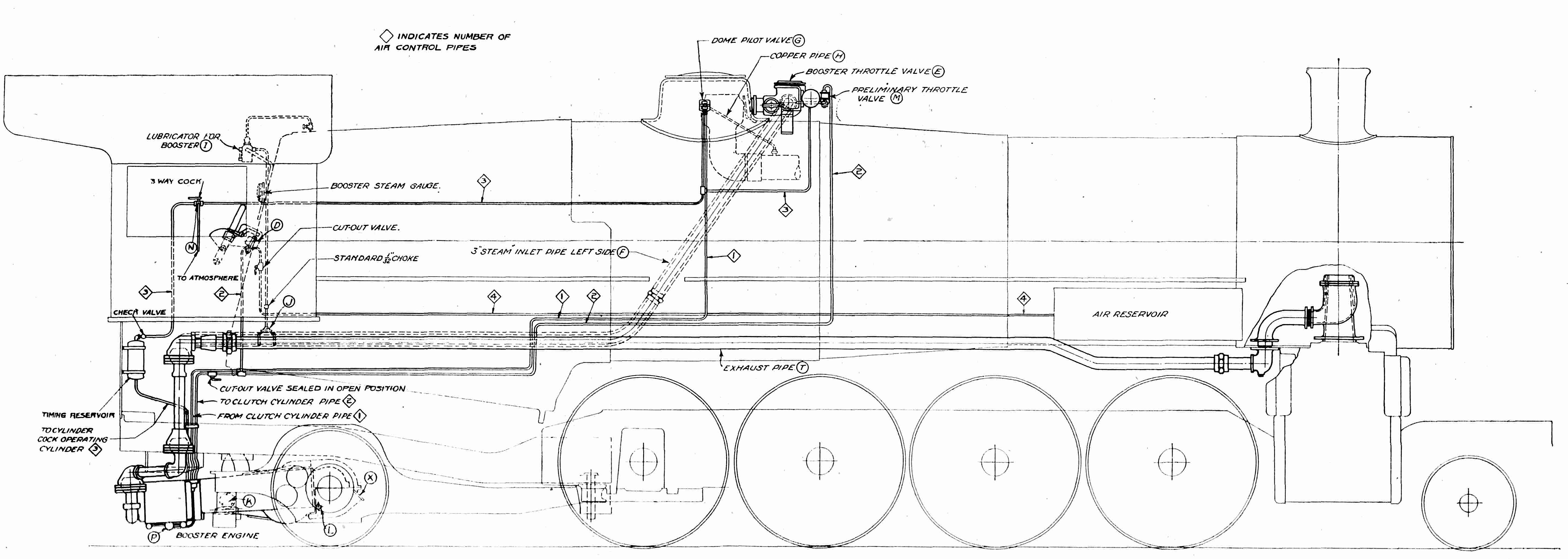
Diagram showing how a booster is installed and connected.

A booster engine for steam locomotives is a small supplementary two-cylinder steam engine back-gear-connected to the trailing truck axle on the locomotive or one of the trucks on the tender. It was invented in 1918 by Howard L. Ingersoll, assistant to the president of the New York Central Railroad.

A rocking idler gear permits the booster engine to be put into operation by the engineer (driver). A geared booster engine drives one axle only and can be non-reversible, with one idler gear, or reversible, with two idler gears. There were variations built by the Franklin company which utilized side rods to transmit tractive force to all axles of the booster truck. These rod boosters were predominately used on the leading truck of the tender, though there is an example of a Lehigh Valley 4-8-4 using it as a trailing tender truck.

A booster engine is used to start a heavy train or maintain low speed under demanding conditions. Rated at about 300–500 horsepower (220–370 kW) at speeds from 10 to 35 mph (16–56 km/h), it can be cut in while moving at speeds under 12–22 mph (19–35 km/h) and is semi-automatically cut out via the engineer notching back the reverse gear or manually through knocking down the control latch up to a speed between 21 and 35 mph (34–56 km/h), depending on the model and gearing of the booster. A tractive effort rating of 10,000–12,000 pounds-force (44–53 kN) was common, although ratings of up to around 15,000 lbf (67 kN) were possible.

Tender boosters are equipped with side-rods connecting axles on the lead truck. Such small side-rods restrict speed and are therefore confined mostly to switching locomotives, often used in transfer services between yards. Tender boosters were far less common than engine boosters; the inherent weight of the tenders would decrease as coal and water were consumed during operation, effectively lowering the adhesion of the booster-powered truck.

== Advantages/disadvantages ==
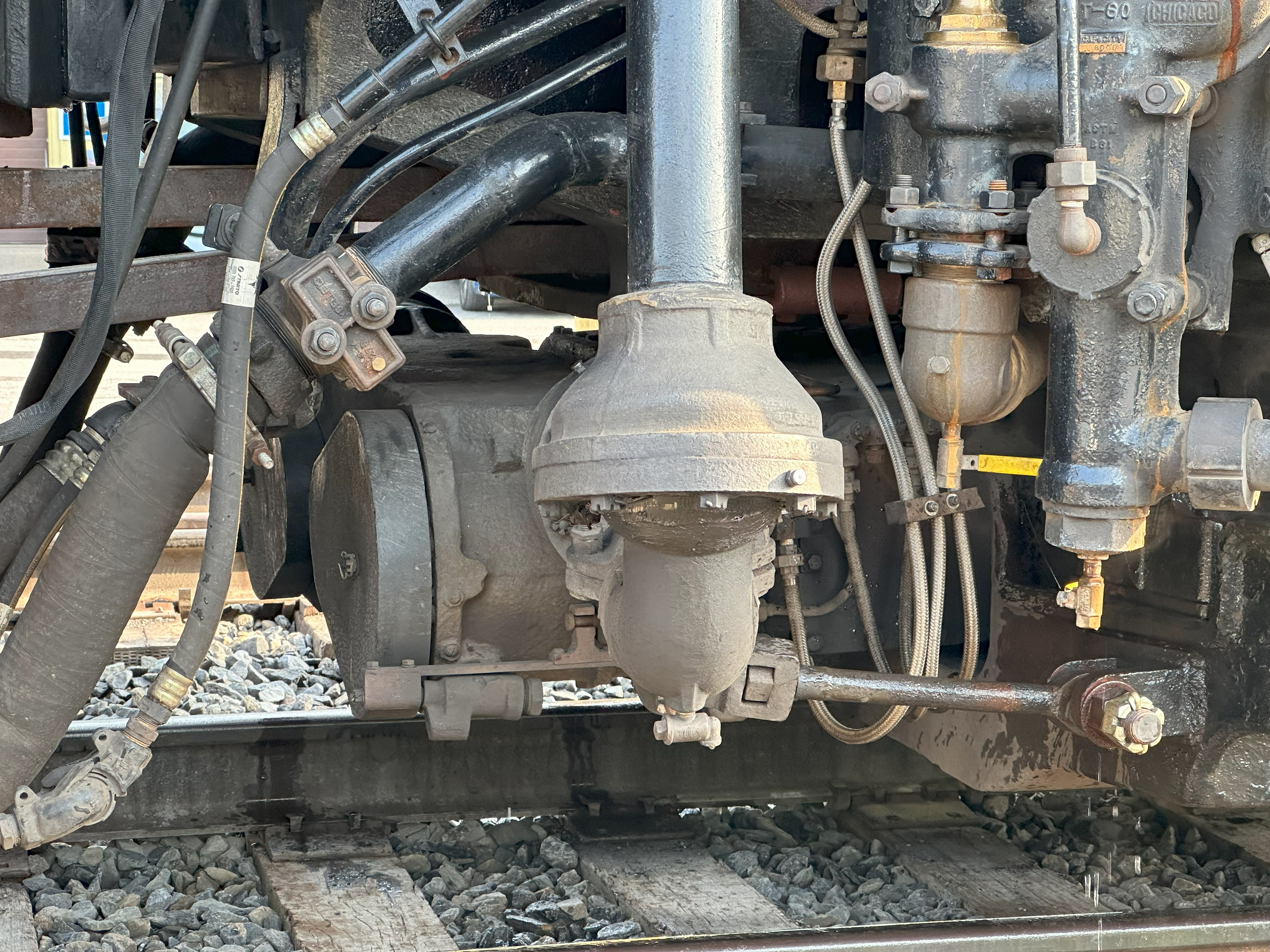
Franklin Type-E locomotive booster affixed to Reading T-1 no. 2102

=== Advantages ===
The booster was intended to make up for fundamental flaws in the design of the standard steam locomotive. Most steam locomotives do not provide power to all wheels. The amount of force that can be applied to the rail depends on the weight on the driven wheels and the factor of adhesion of the wheels against the track. Unpowered wheels are generally needed to provide stability at speed, but at low speed offer no advantages and just add weight. The application of a booster engine to a previously unpowered axle meant that overall starting tractive effort was increased without penalty to the adhesion levels of the main engine.

As the "gearing" of a steam locomotive is fixed (because its pistons are linked directly to the wheels via rods and cranks), a compromise must be struck between ability to exert high tractive effort at low speed and the ability to run fast (without either inducing excessive piston speeds or the exhaustion of steam). At low speeds a steam locomotive is not able to use all the power the boiler is capable of producing; a booster engine puts that wasted potential to use.

The increased starting tractive effort provided by the booster meant that, in some instances, railroads were able to reduce the number of, or eliminate the use of additional helper locomotives on heavier trains. This resulted in lower operating and maintenance costs, higher locomotive availability and productivity (ton-miles), and ultimately, greater profitability.

=== Disadvantages ===
Boosters were costly to maintain, with their flexible steam and exhaust pipes, idler gear, etc. Improper operation could also result in undesirable drops in boiler pressure and/or damage to the booster. The booster and its associated components also added several tons of weight to the locomotive which would be considered "dead weight" at speeds above which it could be used. Additionally, if the booster suffered a failure where the idler gear could not be disengaged, the entire locomotive would be speed restricted to 20 mph (32 km/h) or less until it could be taken out of service to facilitate repairs, decreasing locomotive availability.

== Performance ==
=== Tractive effort ===
A rough calculation of booster tractive effort could be made with the following formula:

$$t = \frac {cd^2spr} {w},$$

where

- t is tractive effort in pound-force
- c is the coefficient representing mean effective pressure, normally set to 0.80
- d is the piston diameter in inches (bore)
- s is the piston stroke in inches
- p is the working pressure in pounds per square inch
- r is the booster gear ratio
- w is the diameter of the trailing wheels to which the booster is geared in inches

=== Operating speeds ===
The typical locomotive booster employed a pair of 10-inch-bore (250 mm) by 12-inch-stroke (300 mm) cylinders. Available gear ratios and associated operating speeds for both the Franklin type C and type E booster models are detailed in the table below.

Locomotive booster gear ratios and associated operating speeds
| | Gear ratio | Maximum cut-in speed | Maximum operating speed |
|---|---|---|---|
| Franklin Type C-1 & C-2 | 2.571 | 12 mph (19 km/h) | 21 mph (34 km/h) |
| Franklin Type E & E-1 | 2.71 | 15 mph (24 km/h) | 25 mph (40 km/h) |
| Franklin Type E & E-1 | 2.25 | 18.5 mph (29.8 km/h) | 30 mph (48 km/h) |
| Franklin Type E & E-1 | 2.00 | 22 mph (35 km/h) | 35 mph (56 km/h) |

== Usage ==
=== North America ===
The booster saw most use in North America. Railway systems elsewhere often considered the expense and complexity unjustified.

Even in North America, booster engine use was limited and irregularly distributed. While some railroads used boosters extensively, others did not. The New York Central was the first to use a booster in 1919 and remained a proponent, applying them to all of its high-drivered 4-6-4 Hudson locomotives to increase their acceleration out of stations with crack passenger trains. The rival Pennsylvania Railroad, however, used few booster-equipped locomotives. The Chesapeake & Ohio specified boosters on all of its Superpower locomotives aside from the Allegheny to increase tonnage ratings over some of the hilly terrain found on their main lines, while rival Norfolk & Western experimented with boosters briefly and found their cost unjustified, instead choosing to increase engine tractive effort through the raising of boiler pressure.

Of 3,257 steam locomotives acquired by the Canadian Pacific Railway between 1881 and 1949, only 55 were equipped with boosters: 17 H1 class 4-6-4s, 2 K1 class 4-8-4s and all 36 Selkirk 2-10-4s.

=== Australia ===
In Australia, Victorian Railways equipped all but one of its X class 2-8-2 locomotives (built between 1929 and 1947) with a 'Franklin' two-cylinder booster engine, following a successful trial of the device on a smaller N class 2-8-2 in 1927. From 1929 onwards, South Australian Railways 500 class 4-8-2 heavy passenger locomotives were rebuilt into 4-8-4s with the addition of a booster truck .

=== New Zealand ===
NZR's KB class of 1939 were built with a booster truck to enable the locomotives to handle the steeper grades of some South Island lines (particularly the Cass Bank of the Midland Line). Some boosters were later removed because of the gear jamming.

=== Great Britain ===
In Great Britain, eight locomotives of four different classes on the London and North Eastern Railway (LNER) were equipped with booster units by Nigel Gresley. Four were existing locomotives rebuilt with boosters between 1923 and 1932: one of class C1 (in 1923), which was given a Franklin Type C-1 booster; both of the conversions from class C7 to class C9 (in 1931), which were given boosters of J. Stone & Co Type C3; and one of class S1 (in 1932). The remaining four were all fitted to new locomotives: the two P1 2-8-2 locomotives, built in 1925 with the Franklin Type C-1 booster; and two class S1 locomotives built in 1932. The three boosters fitted to Class S1 were manufactured by J. Stone & Co, but differed from the two fitted to Class C9 in being reversible and having a gear ratio of 3:1 instead of 1:1. By ordering five boosters from Stones at the same time, the LNER was able to obtain a price of £875 each, whilst the three bought from Franklin had cost more than £1,100 each. The boosters were removed between 1935 and 1938, apart from those on class S1 which were retained until 1943.

An early type of booster used in Great Britain was the steam tender, which was tried in 1859 by Benjamin Connor of the Caledonian Railway on four 2-4-0 locomotives. Archibald Sturrock of the Great Northern Railway (GNR) patented a similar system on 6 May 1863 (patent no. 1135). It was used on fifty GNR 0-6-0 locomotives: thirty converted from existing locomotives between 1863 and 1866, and twenty built new in 1865 (nos. 400–419). The equipment was removed from all fifty during 1867–68.
