= LNER Class P1 =

British steam locomotive class (1925–1945)

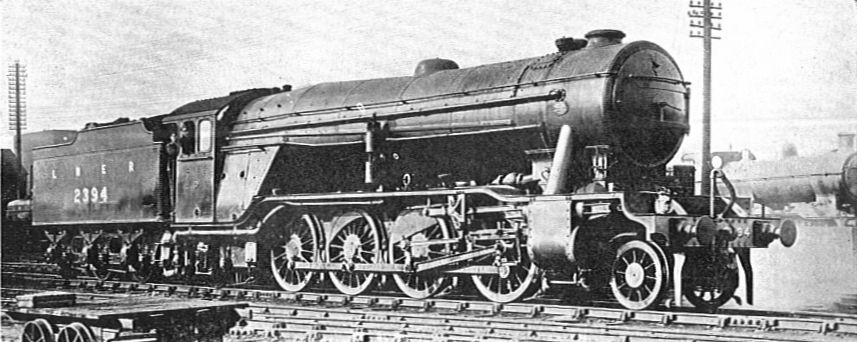
- No. 2394, circa. 1928, with booster engine and Westinghouse pump
Type and origin
- Power type: Steam
- Designer: Sir Nigel Gresley
- Builder: Doncaster Works
- Serial number: 1619–1620
- Build date: June & November 1925
- Total produced: 2
Specifications
- Configuration
  - Whyte: 2-8-2
- Gauge: 4 ft 8 1/2 in (1,435 mm) standard gauge
- Leading dia.: 3 ft 2 in (0.965 m)
- Driver dia.: 5 ft 2 in (1.575 m)
- Trailing dia.: 3 ft 8 in (1.118 m)
- Wheelbase: 36 ft 2 in (11.02 m)
- Axle load: 18.65 long tons (18.95 t; 20.89 short tons)
- Loco weight: 100 long tons (102 t; 112 short tons)
- Tender weight: 51.4 long tons (52.2 t; 57.6 short tons)
- Total weight: 151.4 long tons (153.8 t; 169.6 short tons)
- Fuel type: Coal
- Fuel capacity: 7 long tons (7.1 t; 7.8 short tons)
- Water cap.: 4,700 imp gal (21,400 L; 5,640 US gal)
- Firebox
  - Grate area: 41.25 sq ft (3.832 m^{2})
- Boiler: 6 ft 5 in (1.96 m) max.
- Boiler pressure: 180 psi (1.2 MPa) (as P1/1); 220 psi (1.5 MPa) (as P1/2)
- Heating surface
  - Firebox: 215 sq ft (20.0 m^{2})
  - Tubes: 1,880 sq ft (175 m^{2})
  - Flues: 835 sq ft (77.6 m^{2})
  - Total surface: 3,455 sq ft (321.0 m^{2})
- Superheater: Robinson
- Cylinders: 3 (2 outside, one inside)
- Cylinder size: 20 in × 26 in (508 mm × 660 mm) (as P1/1); 19 in × 26 in (483 mm × 660 mm)) (as P1/2); 10 in × 12 in (254 mm × 305 mm) booster
- Valve gear: Outside: Walschaerts; Inside: Gresley conjugated
- Valve type: 8-inch (203 mm) piston valves
Performance figures
- Tractive effort: (85% boiler pressure) 38,500 lbf (171 kN) (as P1/1); 42,500 lbf (189 kN) (as P1/2); 8,500 lbf (38 kN) booster
Career
- Axle load class: Route availability 7
- Withdrawn: July 1945
- Disposition: Both scrapped

The London and North Eastern Railway Class P1 Mineral 2-8-2 Mikado was a class of two steam locomotives designed by Nigel Gresley. They were two of the most powerful freight locomotives ever designed for a British railway. It was initially intended they be a more powerful 2-10-0 version of the earlier Class O2 2-8-0s. The design was submitted in August 1923, for use between Peterborough and London, and also between Immingham and Wath marshalling yard. The power was quoted as being 25% more than the O2.

== Construction and into service ==
An order for two locomotives was placed with Doncaster Works in November 1923, and Engine Order 303 was issued for these: the individual locomotives were allotted Doncaster works numbers 1619–20. The first P1, No. 2393, was completed by Doncaster in June 1925 and was shown at the Darlington Centenary celebrations in July. No. 2394 was completed in November 1925. Both were externally rather similar, although 2393 had a 32-element superheater while 2394 had a larger 62-element 'E' type superheater. They were the first 2-8-2 locomotives to be built in Britain for local use, although not the first designed. Both were allocated to New England shed after completion where they were subjected to regular testing.

In service, the P1s could handle 100-wagon coal trains, although these were an operational hazard because they overhung track circuits and were too long for many of the passing loops. They were also coal-hungry engines: a 1926 Locomotive Inspectors Conference Report stated that the engines used 131 pounds per mile (37 kg/km) of coal. However, they were still thought of highly enough in 1926 that it was proposed to build another four P1s to replace an equivalent number of 0-8-0s.

== The boosters ==
The P1 class engines were initially equipped with two-cylinder booster engines attached to the trailing axle. They were engaged using a Westinghouse pump mounted on the boiler to engage the cylinder clutch. The booster engine had a tractive effort of 8,500 lbf (38 kN) when used, increasing the tractive effort of the locomotive from 38,500 to 47,000 lbf (171 to 209 kN). It was intended by Gresley that these boosters would be used to assist the locomotive while starting, and in topping the banks over which they travelled.

The tenders attached to the P1s had a specially designed dragbox to accommodate the booster equipment. In practice, the boosters were troublesome. When in operation, they filled the cab with steam, and the fireman's workload was doubled. The steam pipes from the boiler to the booster were prone to fracture, particularly on the sharp curves of the turning triangle at the New England shed. The boosters were removed from engines 2394 and 2393 in 1937 and 1938, respectively.

== Service and withdrawal ==
The two P1s were only ever used between New England and Ferme Park, the only route deemed suitable for them by the Operating Department. In practice there were issues with running such large trains with such powerful engines. The large three-cylinder engines required a considerable effort on the part of the fireman and the booster was known as particularly hungry for steam requiring even more coal. As a result, turns firing the P1s were considered as ones to avoid. It was also found that the heavier trains that the P1s could handle were too long for many of the passing loops resulting in delays to passenger trains. The result was that they were considered uneconomic as they were generally used in hauling trains of less than the 1,000 long tons (1,020 t; 1,120 short tons) for which they were built. In 1934, No. 2394 was experimentally tried on the 07:45 am semi-fast passenger train from Kings Cross to Peterborough as part of the planning stage for P2 class locomotive 2001 Cock o' the North. Although the engine was able to reach a maximum speed of 65 mph (105 km/h), this put too much stress on the fireman who later commented that he was thankful not to have been going beyond Peterborough.

In 1942, both engines were overhauled and their original boilers, then in very poor condition, were replaced with A3-type 220 lbf/in^{2} (1.52 MPa) boilers and their cylinder diameter was reduced to 19 inches (483 mm), leading to an increased tractive effort of 42,500 lbf (189 kN) The valve motion was retained in its original short-lap travel configuration. The rebuilding of no. 2394 took place in November 1942, after which it was intended to reclassify the locomotive P1/2. Before this reclassification could take place, no. 2393 was in the process of undergoing a similar rebuild, this being completed in January 1943, so the need to distinguish the two variants passed and both remained as Class P1.

Due to the reduction of heavy freight trains after the Second World War, both engines were withdrawn and scrapped by Edward Thompson in July 1945, the first Gresley locomotives to be withdrawn and scrapped by intention. The six-wheeled tenders were modified with standard dragboxes to run behind new Thompson Class B2 4-6-0s Nos 2815 Culford Hall and 1632 Belvoir Castle, while the boilers were removed and fitted to Gresley A1s No. 2557 Blair Atholl and 2565 Merry Hampton during their conversion from Class A1 to Class A3.
