= Statue of Sir Nigel Gresley =

Statue in King's Cross railway station, London

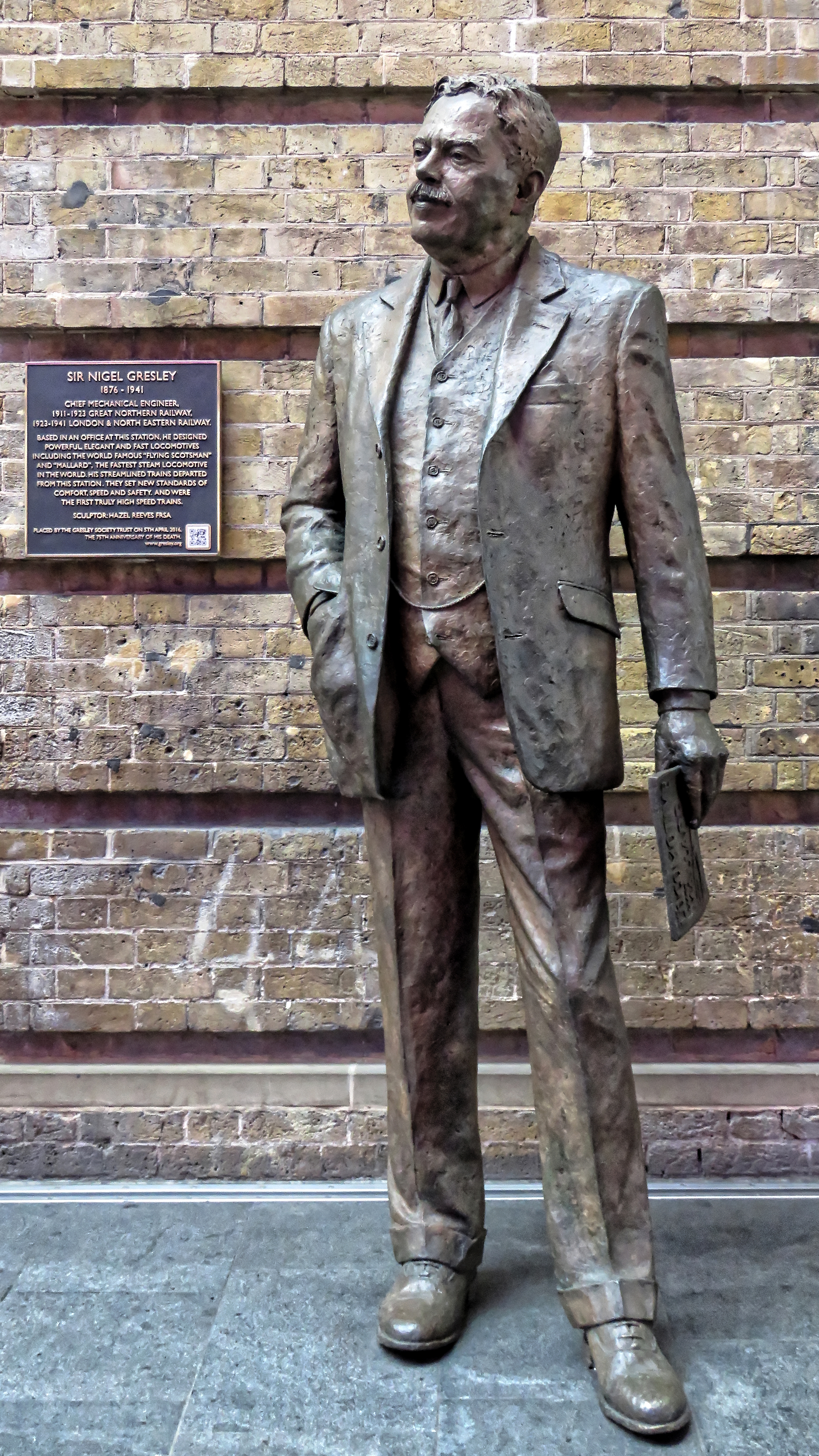
- The statue and plaque
- Subject: Nigel Gresley
- Location: London, United Kingdom; 51.5317°N 0.1236°W

A statue of Sir Nigel Gresley made of bronze stands near the booking office of London King's Cross railway station. It was commissioned by the Gresley Society in memory of Sir Nigel Gresley, a locomotive designer who worked in offices at the station and whose designs included Mallard, which set the unbroken steam locomotive speed record in 1938. The statue was designed by Hazel Reeves and cast in bronze at the Whitechapel Bell Foundry. A decision taken by the Society to omit from the final sculpture a mallard duck that had been shown in the initial design led to what was described as "possibly the most acrimonious argument in the long, pedantic history of the railway hobbyist".

== Statue ==
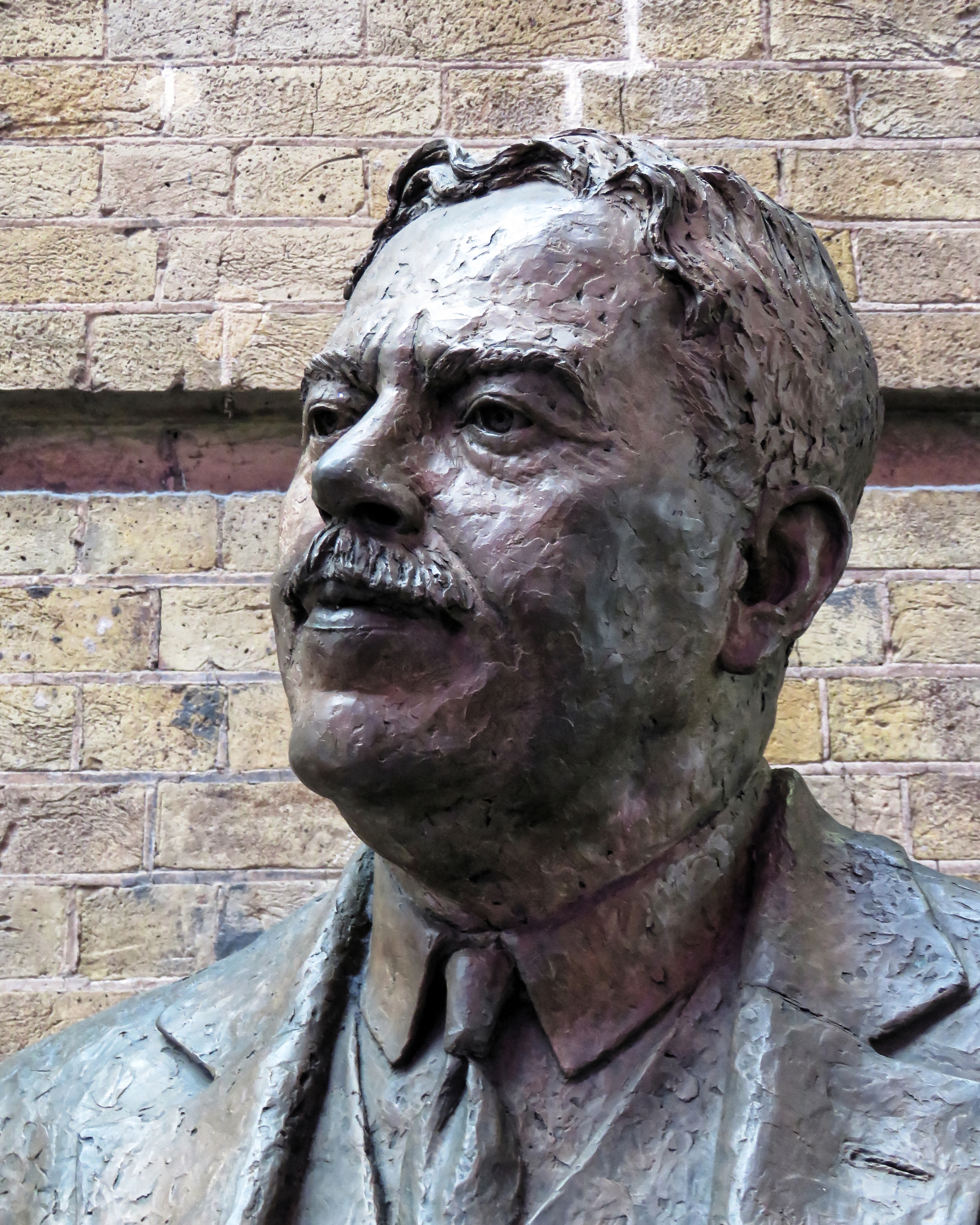
Detail of face

The Gresley Society is a charitable organisation of around 500 members dedicated to the preservation and celebration of the work of Sir Nigel Gresley, a locomotive designer and chief mechanical engineer of the London and North Eastern Railway (LNER). Gresley oversaw the design and construction of 2,150 locomotives and tens of thousands of wagons and carriages; one of his locomotives, the Mallard, set the steam engine speed record in 1938, which stands to this day. The Gresley Society received a £500,000 bequest from the estate of a member in 2012 and, after consulting its members, decided to fund a memorial to Gresley. Originally this was to have been a bust but it was decided that a full-length statue would be more appropriate. The Gresley Society sought donations to the project from the general public and a further £13,000 was raised from 130 contributors.

Sculptor Hazel Reeves was commissioned to produce the statue, for the fee of £95,000. Reeves used the traditional lost-wax casting method. Citing Auguste Rodin's advice to sculptors to begin with a nude figure, she first made a bare model of Gresley from clay (around an armature), to which she added his clothing. This was moulded in resin, which was used to form a wax model for the bronze casting process. The bronze statue was cast at the Whitechapel Bell Foundry. From planning to erection, the statue took 18 months.

The completed work is around 7 feet (2.1 m) high, standing at some 120% of life-size. Gresley is depicted standing with his right hand in his jacket pocket, possibly reaching for his pipe, and with his left hand holding a technical magazine. Reeves stated that she intended her figure to be captured "in a moment of quizzical reflection" and "looking out towards the future". The magazine is a copy of The Locomotive with the front cover showing the Mallard.

The statue was unveiled on 5 April 2016, the 75th anniversary of Gresley's death, in a ceremony attended by Sir Peter Hendy, chairman of Network Rail, and Gresley's descendants. It stands near to the booking office and just yards from the office that Gresley occupied during his time as chief mechanical engineer. A plaque on the wall behind the statue outlines Gresley's career and names the Mallard and Flying Scotsman locomotives. It also notes Gresley's links with King's Cross from which many of his trains ran. The plaque names Reeves and notes that the sculpture was commissioned by the Gresley Society.

== Duck controversy ==
External image
- Original design for the statue, including duck. Via The Guardian

The original design for the statue had a bronze mallard duck near the figure's right foot. The planning application stated: "This duck is no mere whimsy. It is an allusion to Sir Nigel’s most famous locomotive, the Mallard, which holds the world speed record for steam locomotives. It is also an allusion to Sir Nigel’s habit of feeding mallards at his prewar home in Salisbury Hall." As well as the Mallard, several other Gresley locomotives were named after birds, including Bittern, Golden Plover, Gannet and Kingfisher, and it has been claimed that ornithology was one of Gresley's hobbies. The design, including the mallard, was approved by the council of the Gresley Society, Historic England, the landowner (Network Rail), and the planning authority (Camden Council) by November 2013.

In early 2015, the Gresley Society received a letter from Tim Godfrey, its vice-president and a grandson of Gresley, objecting to the inclusion of the duck. The Society held a special meeting at which it was stated: "We would have to keep the duck off the memorial if we wanted to keep good relations with the Gresley family." A further meeting to discuss the statue in March 2015 was attended by Godfrey and his brother Ben. Godfrey, who is a breeder of rare ducks, stated: "It's a statue of a man, not a stupid duck." Godfrey also disputed that Gresley had any interest in ornithology and that the selection of locomotive names lay with the LNER naming committee and not solely with Gresley. Some society members stated that the duck "detracted from the dignity of the statue". During the meeting, the council of the Gresley Society voted against including the duck, leading to the resignations of two of its members.

The decision led to disappointment for pro-duck campaigners. It led to what has been described as "possibly the most acrimonious argument in the long, pedantic history of the railway hobbyist". The dispute was covered in the national newspapers. Steam Railway magazine claimed it had made the Gresley Society "the laughing stock of the railway heritage world". A public petition to reinstate the duck, for the "charm and wit" it added to the statue, attracted 3,200 signatures, including those of Michael Portillo, Vanessa Feltz and Sir William McAlpine. McAlpine, a patron of the Gresley Society, said the duck showed the human side of Gresley and his wider interests and artists claimed it was an important attribute of the piece, providing a reference to the subject's significance.

A December 2015 election for the council of the Gresley Society saw strong campaigning for candidates who would support the inclusion of the duck. However at the meeting, non-members were barred from the room and unable to cast proxy votes for members, which the Society later claimed had been a mistake. The action was the subject of a formal complaint to the Charity Commission. Pro-duck supporters also lobbied Camden Council to insist on the duck as it was shown on the approved planning permission documents. Because of the duck issue, the Gresley Society offered to return the donations of any of the supporters of the original fundraising campaign, but only one chose to take up the offer. The statue was unveiled without the duck, though many attendees at the event brought rubber ducks to demonstrate their opposition to the decision.
