= GNR Class O1 =

Class of British steam locomotives

GNR O1 class LNER O1 (later O3) Class
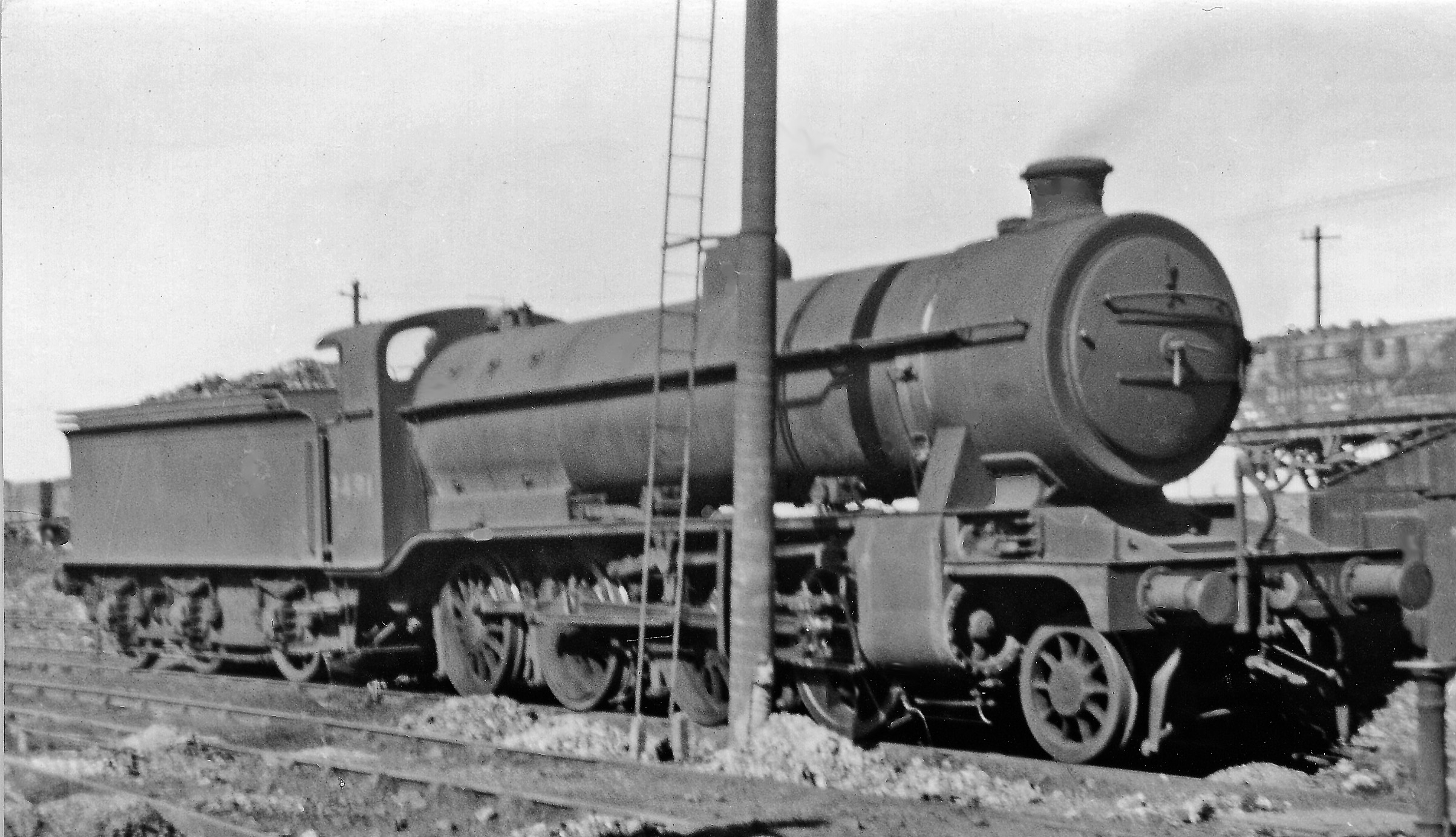
- No. 3491 at Immingham Locomotive Depot 1947
Type and origin
- Power type: Steam
- Designer: Nigel Gresley
- Builder: Doncaster Works (5); North British Locomotive Co. (15)
- Build date: 1913–1919
- Total produced: 20
Specifications
- Configuration
  - Whyte: 2-8-0
  - UIC: 1′D h2
- Gauge: 4 ft 8 1/2 in (1,435 mm)
- Leading dia.: 3 ft 2 in (965 mm)
- Coupled dia.: 4 ft 8 in (1,422 mm)
- Length: 60 ft 11.5 in (18.580 m)
- Loco weight: 76.2–78.65 long tons (77.42–79.91 t)
- Fuel type: Coal
- Firebox
  - Grate area: 27 sq ft (2.5 m^{2})
- Boiler
  - Diameter: 5 ft 6 in (1,680 mm)
- Boiler pressure: 180 lbf/in^{2} (1.24 MPa)
- Heating surface
  - Firebox: 162 sq ft (15.1 m^{2})
  - Total surface: 2,084 sq ft (193.6 m^{2})
- Superheater
  - Type: 24
  - Heating area: 570 sq ft (53 m^{2})
- Cylinders: Two, outside
- Cylinder size: 21 in × 28 in (533 mm × 711 mm)
- Valve gear: Walschaerts
- Valve type: 10-inch (254 mm) piston valves
Performance figures
- Tractive effort: 33,735 lbf (150.06 kN)
Career
- Operators: Great Northern Railway (Great Britain); London and North Eastern Railway; British Railways
- Power class: 8F
- Nicknames: Tangos
- Axle load class: Route availability 6
- Withdrawn: 1947–1952
- Disposition: All scrapped

The Great Northern Railway (GNR) Class O1 was a class of two-cylinder 2-8-0 steam locomotive designed by Nigel Gresley for heavy freight work and built by the GNR between 1913 and 1919.

== History ==
Gresley designed the O1 2-8-0 for the heavy coal trains on the mainline from Grantham to London, ordering five examples 1913, which were completed at Doncaster in 1914. A further fifteen were ordered in January 1916, but due to the First World War delays were incurred and construction was transferred to the North British Locomotive Company, who delivered the first ten in April 1918, followed by a further five in October and November 1919.

Table of orders and numbers
| Year | Order | Manufacturer | Serial number | Quantity | GNR Nos. | LNER Nos. | LNER 1944 Nos. | Notes |
|---|---|---|---|---|---|---|---|---|
| 1913–14 | EO 274 | Doncaster Works | 1411–1413, 1415, 1418 | 5 | 456–460 | 3456–3460 | 3475–3479 | |
| 1919 | | North British Locomotive Co. (Hyde Park Works) | 22060–22069 | 10 | 462–471 | 3462–3471 | 3480–3489 | |
| 1919 | | North British Locomotive Co. (Atlas Works) | 22099–22103 | 5 | 472–476 | 3472–3476 | 3490–3494 | |

The class was re-designated O3 by the London and North Eastern Railway in 1944 to release the O1 classification for use with the LNER Thompson Class O1 introduced during the Second World War.

== British Railways ==
Seventeen examples survived into British Railways ownership in 1948, but all had been withdrawn by 1952.

Table of withdrawals
| Year | Quantity in service at start of year | Quantity withdrawn | Locomotive numbers | Notes |
|---|---|---|---|---|
| 1947 | 20 | 3 | 3487, 3490, 3492 | |
| 1948 | 17 | 2 | 3489/94 | |
| 1949 | 15 | 0 | – | |
| 1950 | 15 | 1 | 63491 | |
| 1951 | 14 | 10 | 63475/77–81/83/85–86/93 | |
| 1952 | 4 | 4 | 63476/82/84/88 | |
