= LNER Class J39 =

Class of 289 two-cylinder locomotives

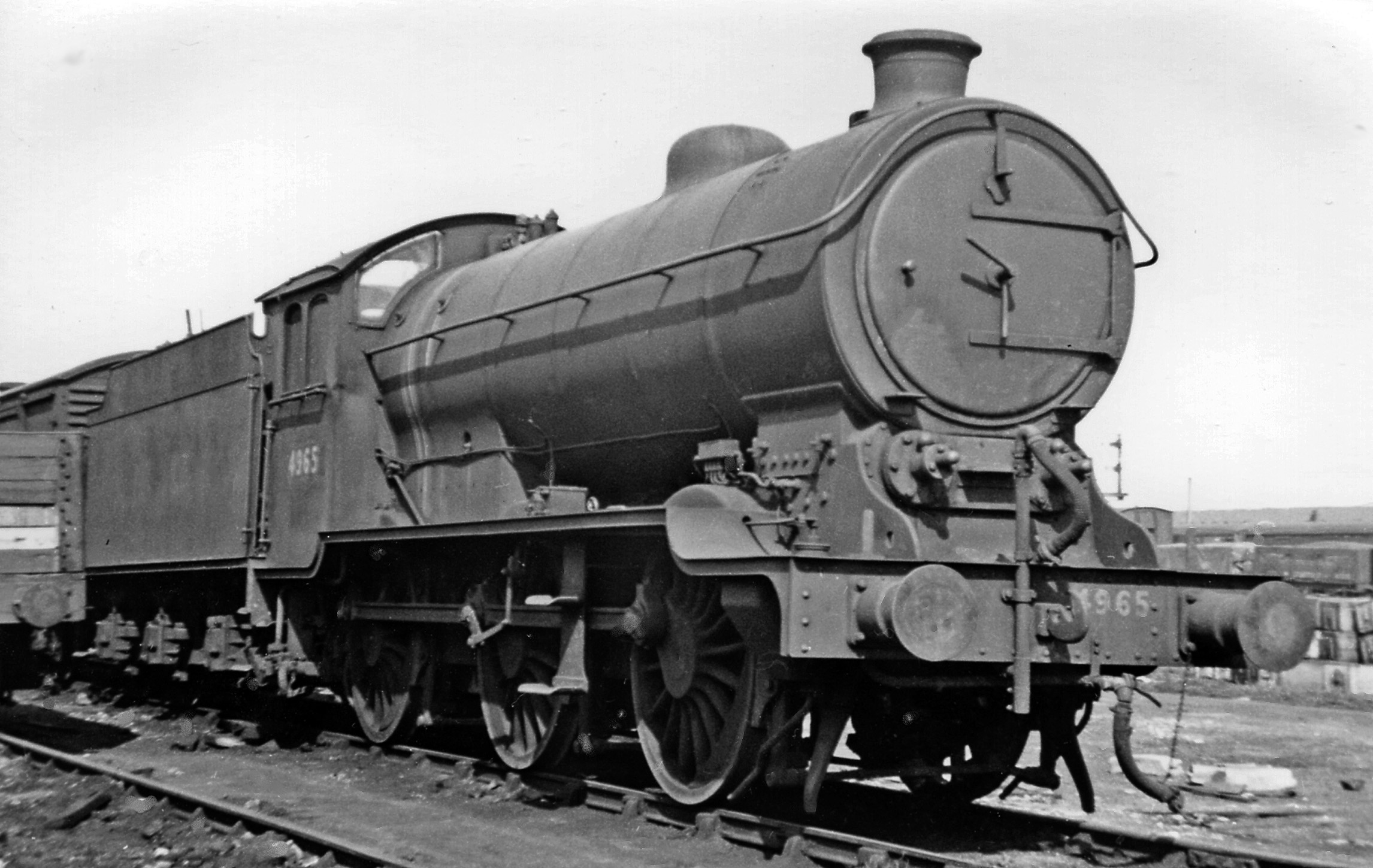
- No. 4965 at Grantham Shed 1947
Type and origin
- Power type: Steam
- Designer: Nigel Gresley
- Build date: 1926-1941
- Total produced: 289
Specifications
- Configuration
  - Whyte: 0-6-0
  - UIC: Ch2
- Gauge: 4 ft 8 1/2 in (1,435 mm) standard gauge
- Driver dia.: 5 ft 2 in (1.575 m)
- Length: J39/1: 54 ft 0 in (16.46 m); J39/2: 55 ft 8 3/8 in (16.977 m); J39/3: 54 ft 10 1/8 in (16.716 m)
- Loco weight: 57.85 long tons (58.8 t; 64.8 short tons)
- Tender weight: J39/1 44.2 long tons (44.9 t; 49.5 short tons), J39/2 52.65 long tons (53.5 t; 59.0 short tons) J39/3, various
- Fuel type: Coal
- Water cap.: Various
- Firebox
  - Grate area: 26 sq ft (2.4 m^{2})
- Boiler pressure: 180 psi (1.24 MPa)
- Heating surface: 1,397.78 sq ft (129.858 m^{2})
- Superheater
  - Heating area: 271.80 sq ft (25.251 m^{2})
- Cylinders: Two, inside
- Cylinder size: 20 in × 26 in (508 mm × 660 mm)
- Valve gear: Stephenson
- Valve type: piston valves
Performance figures
- Tractive effort: 25,665 lbf (114.16 kN)
Career
- Operators: London and North Eastern Railway; British Railways
- Class: LNER: J39; BR: 4P5F
- Numbers: 4700-4988 : LNER, BR : 64700-64988
- Withdrawn: 1959–1962
- Disposition: All scrapped

The London and North Eastern Railway (LNER) Class J39 was a class of medium powered 0-6-0 steam locomotive designed for mixed-traffic work throughout the former LNER system between London and the north of Scotland.

== History ==
The class was introduced by Nigel Gresley in July 1926, based on his previous Class J38 (introduced in January 1926) but with larger driving wheels. The larger wheels enabled them to be used on both passenger and freight trains, although at the expense of a lower tractive effort. As a result they were given the BR power classification 4P/5F, rather than the 6F of the earlier class. A total of 289 examples were built over the next fifteen years, mostly built by the LNER's Darlington Works although 28 were built by Beyer, Peacock and Co. in 1935.

The larger wheels necessitated the provision of low splashers over the front two wheels, which is the main means of differentiating between the two classes. However the increased speed afforded by the larger wheels caused the big end bearings to overheat, something that was aggravated by their use on passenger trains, and reliability suffered as a result. The locomotives were all fitted with superheaters and Ross 'Pop' safety valves.

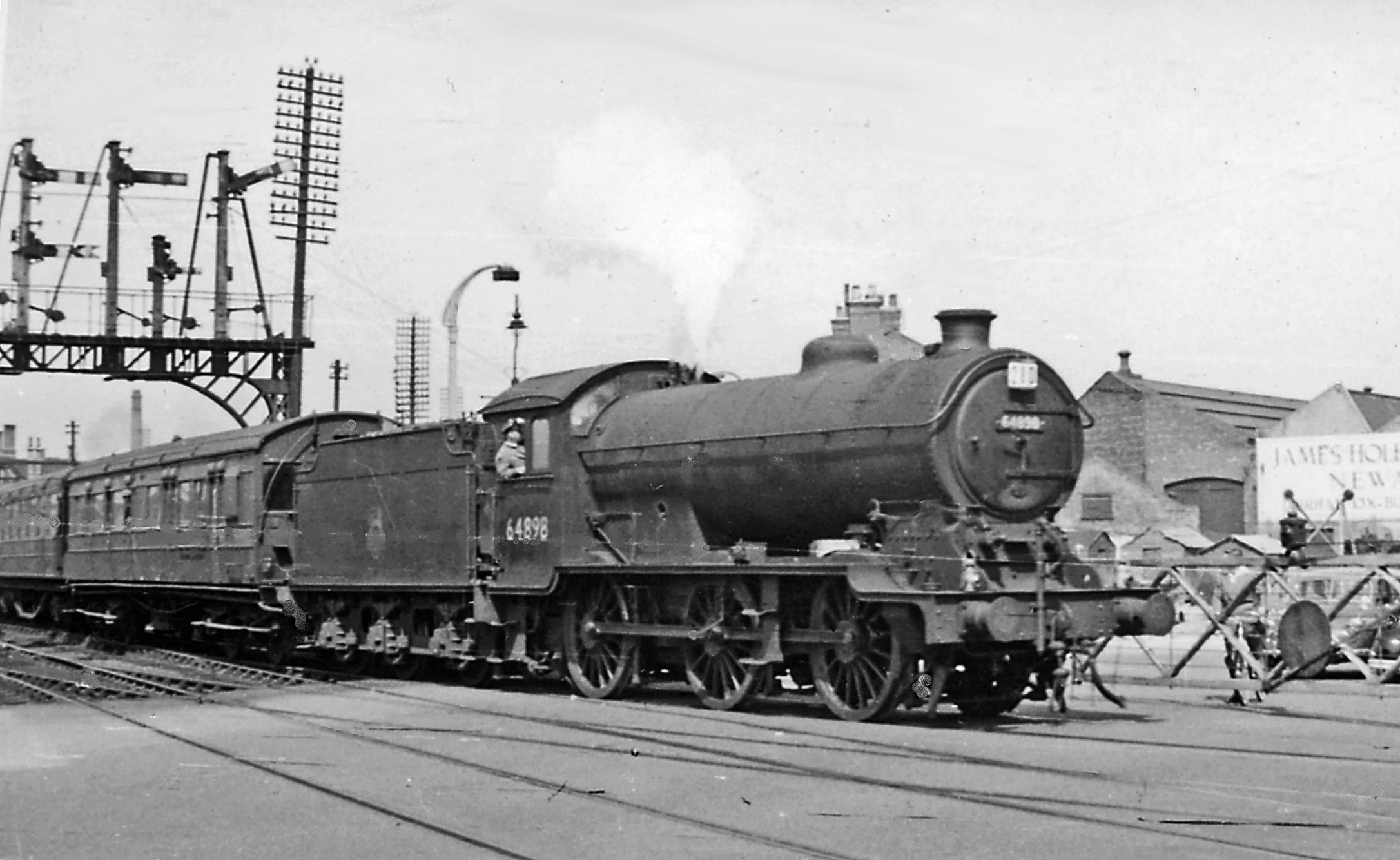
J39/2 No. 64898 at Lincoln, Pelham St. Level-Crossing 21 May 1956

All passed into British Railways ownership in 1948 and they were numbered 64700-64988. They began to be withdrawn from service in 1959 and all examples had been scrapped by the end of 1962. No. 64747 served out the remainder of its days as a stationary boiler at the Woodford shed until October 1964.

== Orders and numbering ==
355 locomotives were scheduled to be built, but 289 were built. Each of the LNER's three main areas received an allocation of new locomotives, as follows:

J39 locomotive orders
Building programme	Date ordered	Years built	Southern Area	North Eastern Area	Scottish Area	Total
1926	November 1925	1926–27	32	12	–	44
1928	August 1927	1928–29	40	–	12	52
1929	December 1928	1929–30	16	8	3	27
1930	December 1929	1931–33	15	6 (6)	4 (4)	25 (10)
1931	–	–	– (25)	– (25)	– (6)	– (56)
1934	December 1933	1934	–	12	–	12
1935	December 1934	1935	27	12	–	39
1935–36	September 1935	1936	6	–	–	6
1935–36	October 1935	1936–37	9	16	3	28
1937	November 1936	1937–38	20	12	6	38
1940	January 1940	1941	14	–	4	18
Total			179 (25)	78 (31)	32 (10)	289 (66)

All were built at Darlington, except for the 28 ordered in October 1935, which were built by Beyer Peacock (works nos. 6802–29). Cancelled locomotives shown in parentheses.

As built the locomotives were mostly given numbers in two broad groups:

- vacant numbers within the former North Eastern Railway (NER) series: 1233/55/9/63/5–70/2–5/7/81/2/6/7/9/90/5/6/8, 1412/8/25/9/36/48–60/3–98, 1504–6/8/9/32–48/51/8/60/3/77/80/4–7, 1803/4/8/13/24/8/35/54/6/7/62/3/9/70/5/80/94/6/8, 1903/22/6–8/30/3/40/2/3/52/65/71/4/7/80/4/96/7
- runs of consecutive unused numbers between the end of the NER series and the start of the former Great Northern Railway (GNR) series: 2691–2742, 2770–88, 2941–53, 2962–3000

The final batch, built in 1941, took consecutive numbers 3081–98 within the former GNR series.

In 1943, the locomotives were allotted the continuous block of numbers 4700–4988, largely in order of construction, but these were not applied until 1946–47. British Railways increased these numbers by 60000, a process that took until 1951 to complete.

== Sub-classes ==
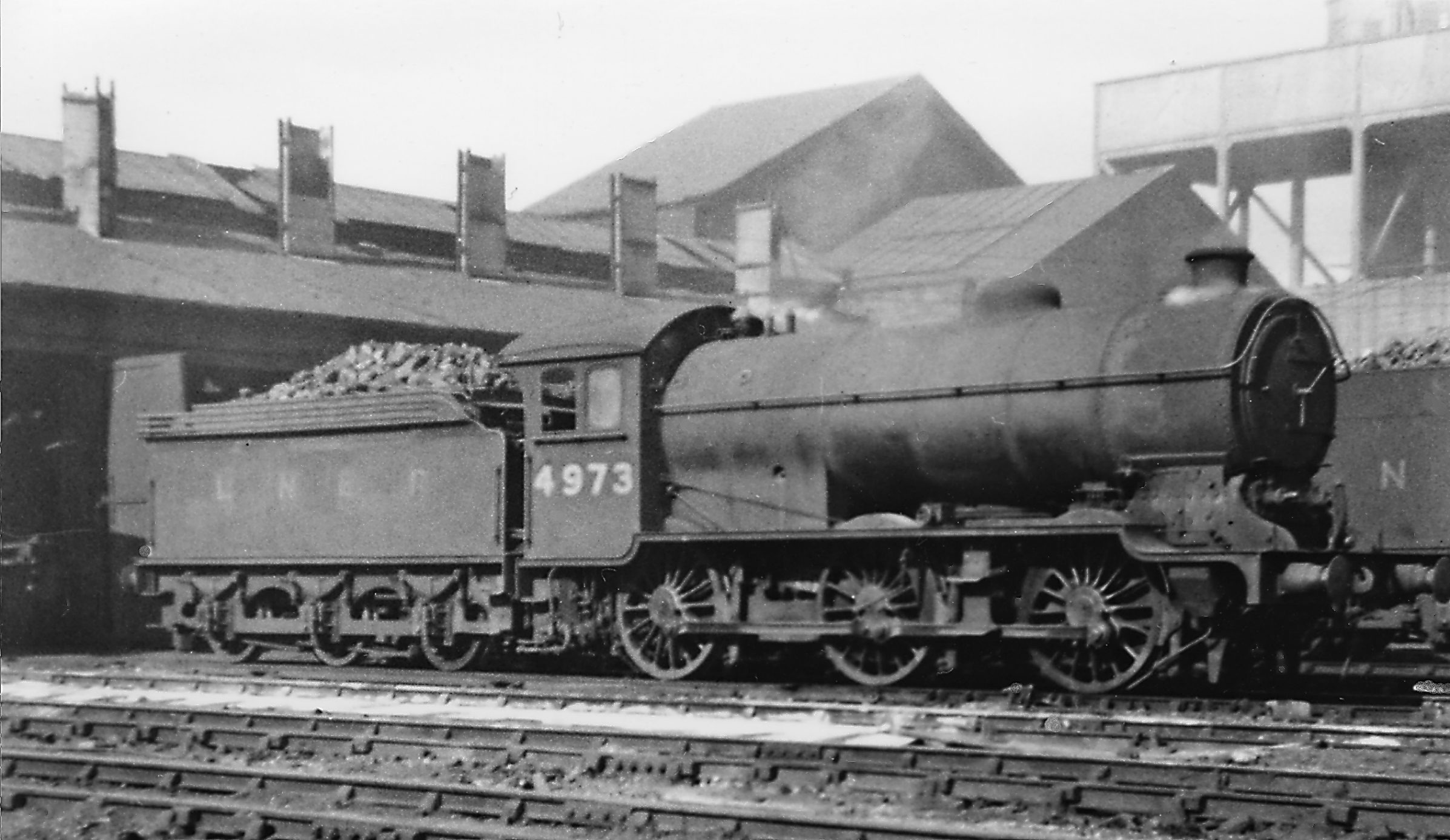
J39/3 No. 4973 at Immingham Locomotive Depot 21 September 1947.

The class was divided into three sub-classes depending on the type of tender fitted.

- J39/1 Standard LNER 3500 gallon tender.
- J39/2 Standard LNER 4200 gallon tender.
- J39/3 Various former North Eastern Railway tenders 3940-4125 gallons.

== Accidents and incidents ==
- On 31 July 1927, locomotive No. 1459 was derailed at 9.33pm, 200 yards east of the Sandsend tunnel mouth on the Whitby-Loftus line whist hauling the No. 70 West Hartlepool to Whitby return excursion.
- Circa 1930, locomotive No. 1448 was derailed by trap points at Lumpsey Colliery, Brotton, Yorkshire.
- On 28 August 1950, the connecting rod of a locomotive of this class became detached and consequently pierced the firebox, scalding the driver.
- On 23 October 1950, locomotive No. 64880 was hauling a passenger train that was derailed at Drumburgh, Cumberland due to the condition of the track. Two people were killed and three were injured.

== In model form ==
Bachmann manufactures the J39/2 version in 00 gauge model form.

Bassett-Lowke manufactures the J39/2 version in 0 gauge model form.

Union Mills manufactures the J39 in British N-Scale.

Graham Farish-Bachmann manufactures the J39 in N scale as BR black with late crest & stepped tender numbered as 64841 and 64880.
