= GNR Class J23 =

Class of locomotives

GNR Class J23; LNER Classes J50 & J51
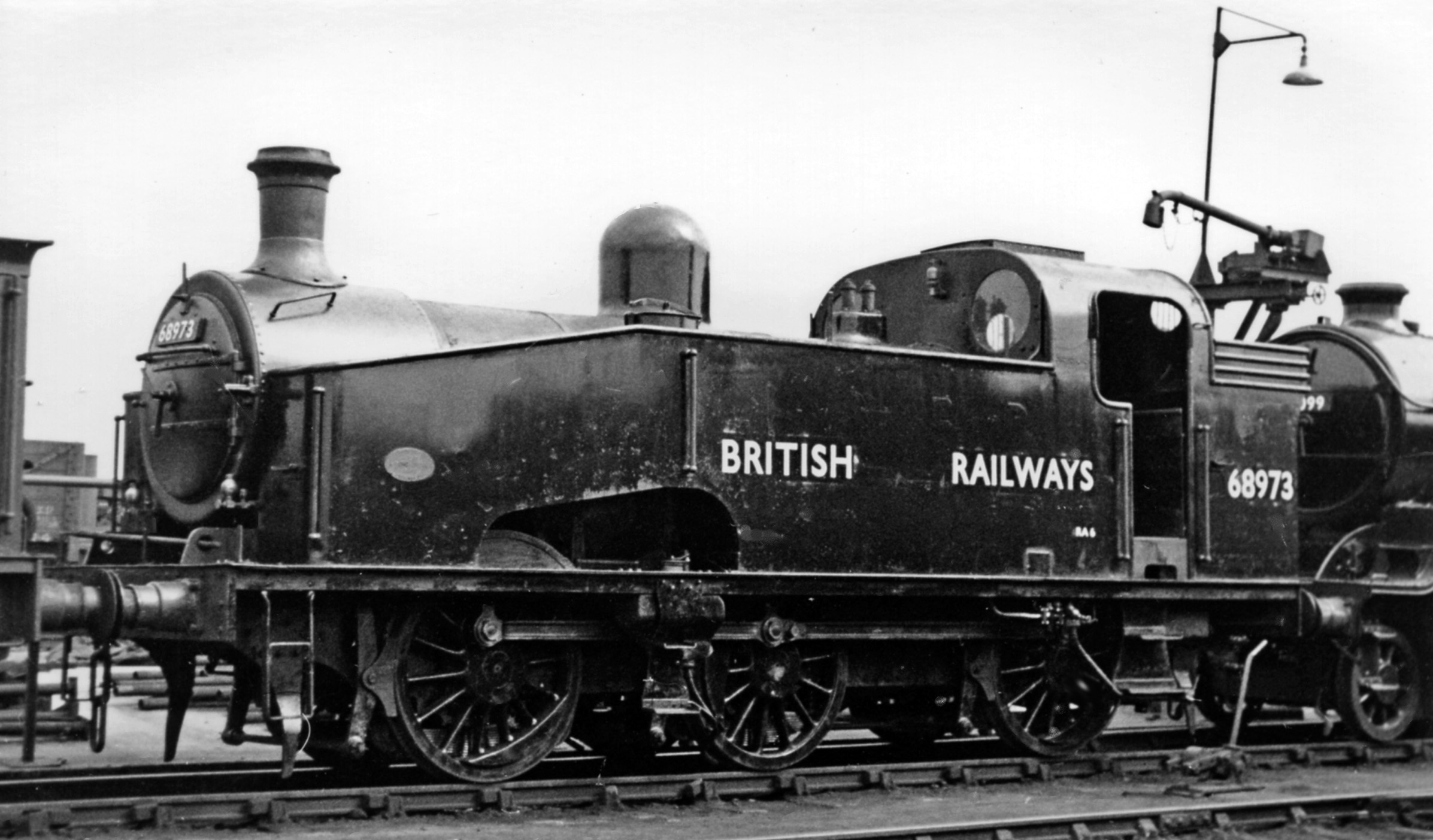
- J50/3 No. 68973 0-6-0T at Doncaster Locomotive Depot, fresh from repair at Doncaster Works
Type and origin
- Power type: Steam
- Designer: Nigel Gresley
- Builder: Doncaster Works; Gorton Works
- Build date: 1913–1939
- Total produced: 102
Specifications
- Configuration
  - Whyte: 0-6-0T
  - UIC: C
- Gauge: 4 ft 8 1/2 in (1,435 mm) standard gauge
- Driver dia.: 56 in (1.422 m)
- Loco weight: J50/1: 56.3 long tons (57.2 t; 63.1 short tons); J50/2: 57 long tons (58 t; 64 short tons); J50/3 & J50/4: 58.15 long tons (59.08 t; 65.13 short tons)
- Fuel type: Coal
- Boiler pressure: 175 psi (1.21 MPa)
- Cylinders: Two, inside
- Cylinder size: 18 1/2 in × 26 in (470 mm × 660 mm)
Performance figures
- Tractive effort: 23,636 lbf (105.14 kN)
Career
- Operators: Great Northern Railway; London and North Eastern Railway; British Railways
- Class: GNR: J23; LNER: J50, J51
- Power class: BR: 4F
- Number in class: J50/1: 10; J50/2: 40; J50/3: 38; J50/4: 14
- Nicknames: Submarines
- Axle load class: Route Availability 6
- Locale: Eastern Region
- Withdrawn: 1958–1965
- Disposition: All scrapped.

The Great Northern Railway Class J23 was a class of 0-6-0T steam locomotive. They had long side tanks that came to the front of the smokebox, which sloped forwards to improve visibility and had a recess cut in to aid maintenance. Forty were built by the Great Northern Railway (GNR) between 1913 and 1922, with a further 62 being added by the London and North Eastern Railway (LNER) between 1924 and 1939. They were given the nickname "Submarines" due to their long tanks.

== History ==
For shunting and local goods work, the Great Northern Railway (GNR) had traditionally used saddle-tank engines of the 0-6-0 wheel arrangement; the last of these, of GNR Class J13, having been built in 1909 to the designs of Henry Ivatt, the GNR Locomotive Superintendent.

Nigel Gresley succeeded Ivatt in 1911, and soon identified a need for engines to work the short-haul coal traffic in the West Riding of Yorkshire; the nature of which required that the locomotives also be suitable for shunting. He designed a new class of 0-6-0T engine, using side tanks instead of saddle tanks. Gresley had recently begun the rebuilding of the GNR Class L1 0-8-2T locomotives with larger boilers, 4 feet 8 inches (1.42 m) in diameter, which left a number of 4-foot-2-inch (1.27 m) diameter boilers spare. Thirty of these were used in the construction of the new goods tank engines between 1913 and 1919; when ten more were built in 1922, these again used secondhand boilers, but 4 feet 5 inches (1.35 m) in diameter. On the GNR, both varieties were classified J23, but the LNER divided them into J51 with smaller boilers, and J50 with larger boilers.

They were unsuperheated, although the prototype J51 (3167) was fitted with a 16-element Robinson superheater as a trial. The savings from this were small, 3.7%, and not considered worthwhile. No others were superheated and this one was removed in 1930 when it was rebuilt as a J50. The LNER continued the construction of Class J50, building a further 62 up to 1939, only the first ten of which were given secondhand boilers. Class J51 were rebuilt to class J50 between 1929 and 1935.

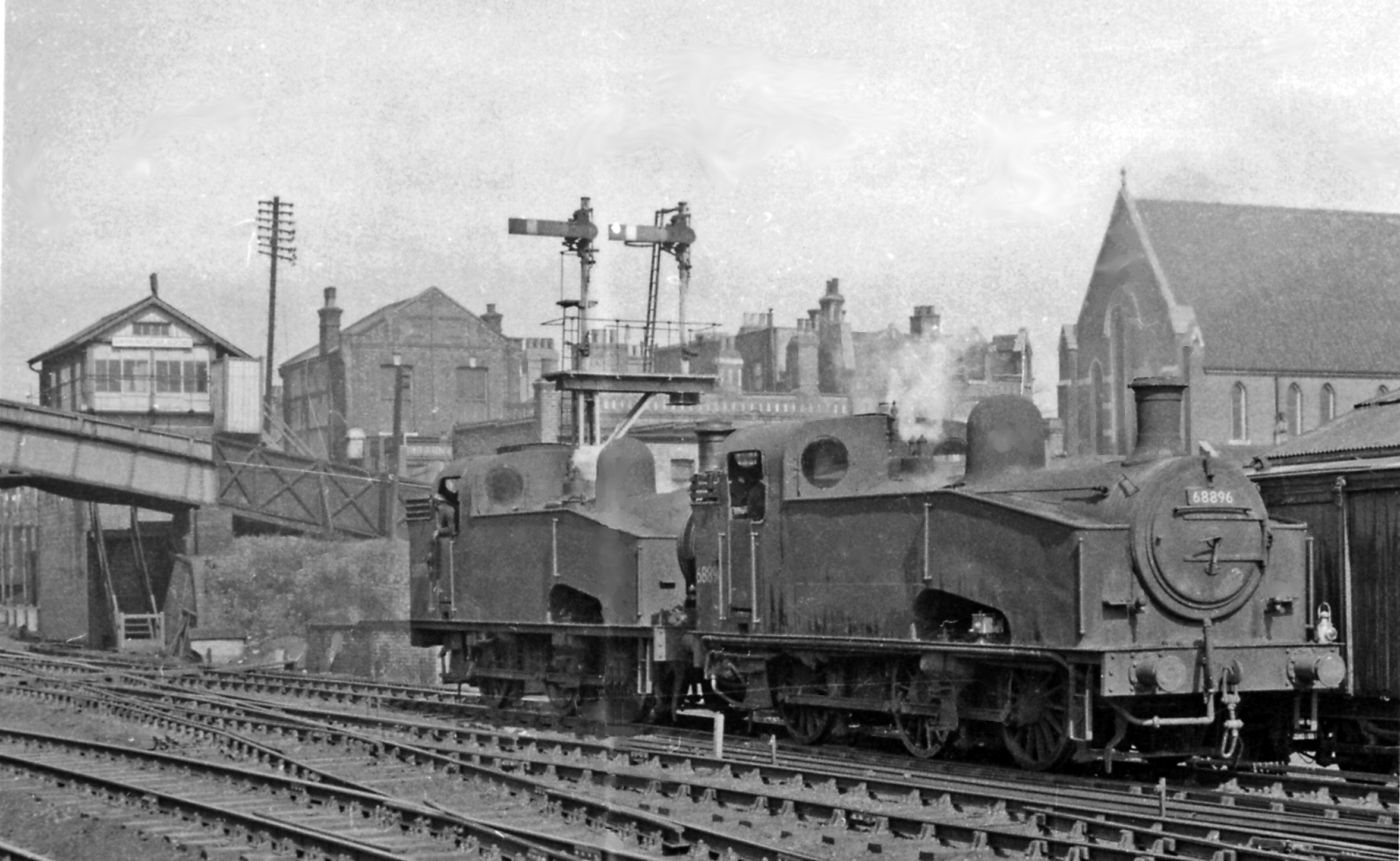
J50/1 No. 68896 leading J50/3 No. 68975 at Harringay 9 April 1960.

Each of the two main classes exhibited variations: locomotive brakes could be operated by vacuum or steam pressure; the driving position could be on the right- or the left-hand side of the cab; and there were three sizes of coal bunker. These variations were recognised by class subdivisions:

- J51/1 10 built 1913–14, 4 ft 2 in boiler, vacuum brake, right-hand drive, short bunker
- J51/2 20 built 1914–19, as J51/1 but long bunker
- J50/1 10 rebuilt 1929–35 from J51/1 with 4 ft 5 in boiler
- J50/2 20 built 1922–24, as J51/2 but 4 ft 5 in boiler, plus 20 rebuilt 1929–34 from J51/1 with 4 ft 5 in boiler
- J50/3 38 built 1926–30, 4 ft 5 in boiler, steam brake, left-hand drive, long bunker
- J50/4 14 built 1938–39, 4 ft 5 in boiler, vacuum brake, left-hand drive, long bunker with hopper

All were built at Doncaster, except the last fourteen which were built at Gorton. Further orders were placed in 1939 and 1941 totalling 25 more locomotives, but these were cancelled in 1942 after a number of components had been manufactured. In 1952, 30 locomotives were allocated to Hornsey shed in North London to handle cross-London freight transfer trip to the Southern Region. Withdrawals began in 1958 with the arrival of diesel shunters and ended in 1963 for the normal stock. 7 of them survived as departmental stock until 1965. The class became extinct in September 1965 when Departmental No. 14 (ex-68961) was withdrawn and scrapped. None of them survived into preservation.

== Numbering ==
On the GNR, the numbers were 157–164, 166–176, 178, 211–230; these were increased by 3000 by the LNER. The first ten engines built by the LNER were numbered 3231–40, following on from the GNR engines; but those built from 1926 were given scattered numbers between 583 and 636, between 1037 and 1086, and 2789–94.

In 1943, new numbers were allotted in a continuous block from 8890 to 8991; these numbers were applied between January and December 1946, but before this could be done, the oldest ten, nos. 3157–64/6/7 were temporarily renumbered 3180–9 in May and June 1945. They duly received their permanent numbers 8890–9 between June and December 1946. Under British Railways, the 1946 numbers were increased by 60000.
