= West Engineering XJ38 =

XJ38
- Type: Turbojet
- Manufacturer: West Engineering Company
- Designer: Edward West Jr.
- First run: 1946
- Developed from: General Electric Type B

The West Engineering XJ38 was a small turbojet engine created by modifying World War II-surplus aircraft engine turbosuperchargers. Intended to be a cheap method of producing jet engines for target drones for the United States Navy, the latter lost interest in the project, which was soon discontinued because of lack of funding.

== Design and development ==
In 1946, Edward West, Jr obtained 6,000 war surplus General Electric Type B aircraft engine turbosuperchargers. His intention was to convert these into cheap, expendable turbojet engines that could be used to power target drones. He was awarded a US Navy contract to manufacture the engine, which was designated as the XJ38-WS-2.

The modifications to the turbosuperchargers were extensive, as a single reverse flow combustion chamber was connected to the compressor outlet and the turbine inlet, where the aircraft piston engine would normally be fitted. A fuel metering system and new inlet and outlet ducts, and a re-engineered turbine was needed as well.

The Navy contract called for three engines that would produce 214 lb (97 kg) thrust at 26,000 rpm. The engine was to weigh 180 lb, and the thrust specific fuel consumption was to be 1.7. The Navy lost interest in this engine design, and never funded the qualification testing, resulting in the demise of the development program.

West sought private interest in the engine, suggesting that it produced sufficient power for a light twin-engine race plane. No interest was found, even when he increased the power to 400 lb (181 kg) of thrust. which he suggested that a small twin-engine aircraft that he had designed. West continued development of this small turbine engine, but due to a lack of funding, he ended the development in 1950.

== Specifications (XJ38-WS-2) ==
Data from The history of North American small gas turbine aircraft engines

==== General characteristics ====
- Type: Turbojet
- Length:
- Diameter:
- Dry weight: 180 lb (81.6 kg)

==== Components ====
- Compressor: Centrifugal
- Combustors: Single reverse flow
- Turbine: Single stage

==== Performance ====
- Maximum thrust: 218 lbf (970 N)
- Specific fuel consumption: 1.7 lb/(lbf⋅h) (48 g/(kN⋅s))
- Thrust-to-weight ratio: 1.31
