= Nigel Gresley =

British engineer (1876–1941)

Sir Nigel Gresley CBE
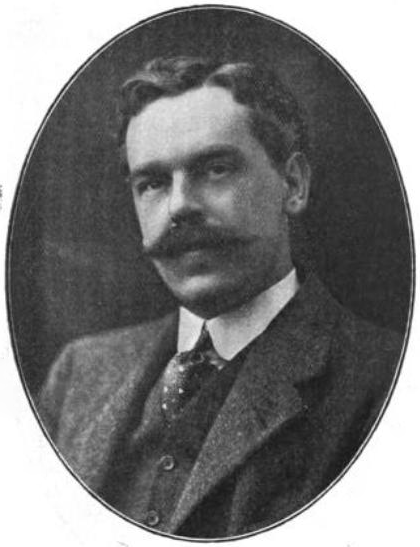
- Nigel Gresley in 1911
- Born: 19 June 1876; Edinburgh, Scotland
- Died: 5 April 1941 (aged 64); Watton-at-Stone, Hertfordshire, England
- Engineering career
- Discipline: Locomotive engineer and designer
- Employer(s): Great Northern Railway, London and North Eastern Railway

Sir Herbert Nigel Gresley CBE (19 June 1876 – 5 April 1941) was a British railway engineer. He was one of Britain's most famous steam locomotive engineers, who rose to become Chief Mechanical Engineer (CME) of the London and North Eastern Railway (LNER). He was the designer of some of the most famous steam locomotives in Britain, including the LNER Class A1, A3 and LNER Class A4 4-6-2 Pacific engines. An A3 Pacific, Flying Scotsman, was the first steam locomotive officially recorded over 100 mph in passenger service, and an A4, No. 4468 Mallard, still holds the record for being the fastest steam locomotive in the world (126 mph).

Gresley's engines were considered elegant, both aesthetically and mechanically. His invention of a three-cylinder design with only two sets of Walschaerts valve gear, the Gresley conjugated valve gear, produced smooth running and power at lower cost than would have been achieved with a more conventional three sets of Walschaerts gear.

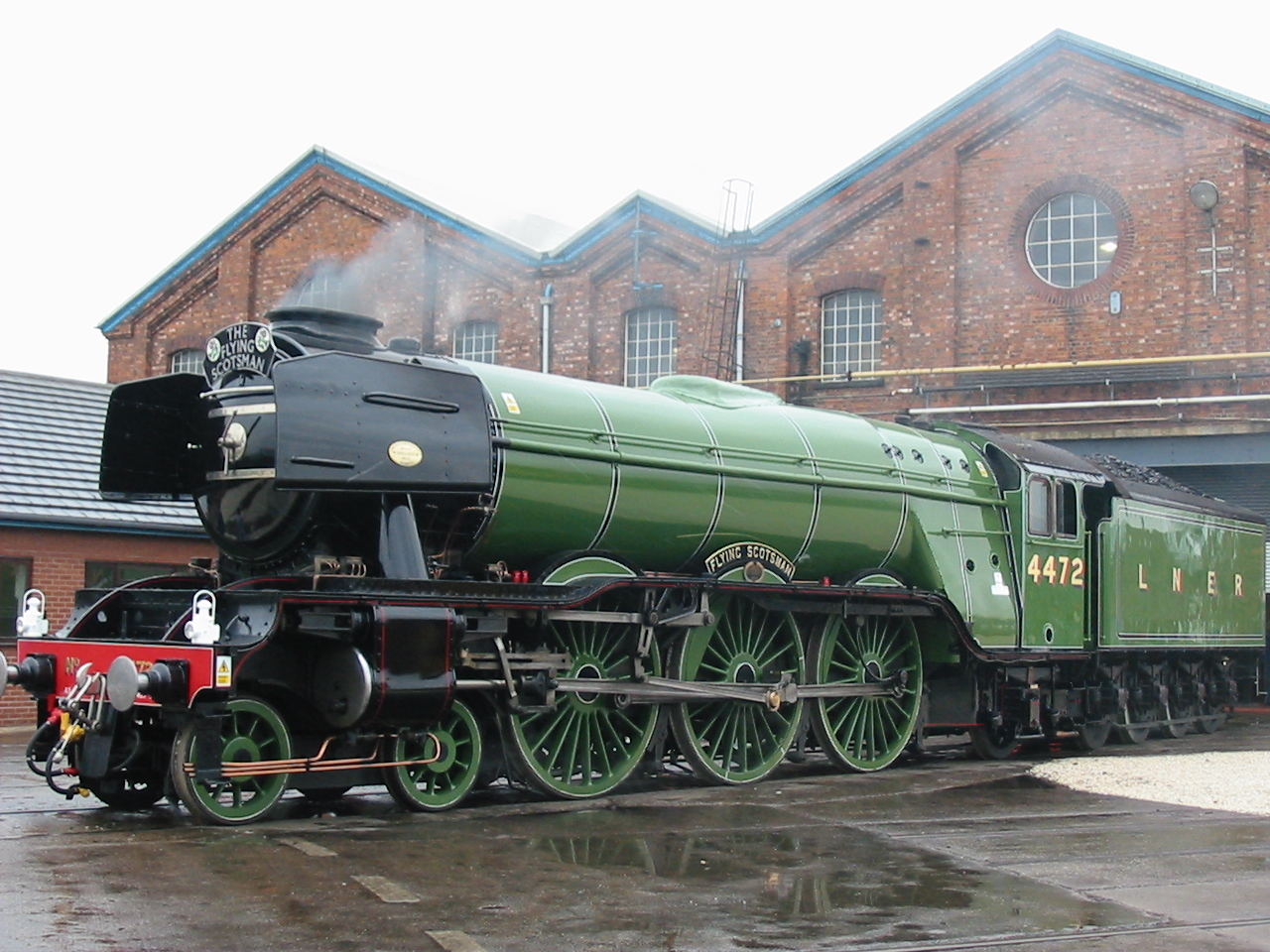
LNER No. 4472 Flying Scotsman at Doncaster Works in 2003

== Biography ==
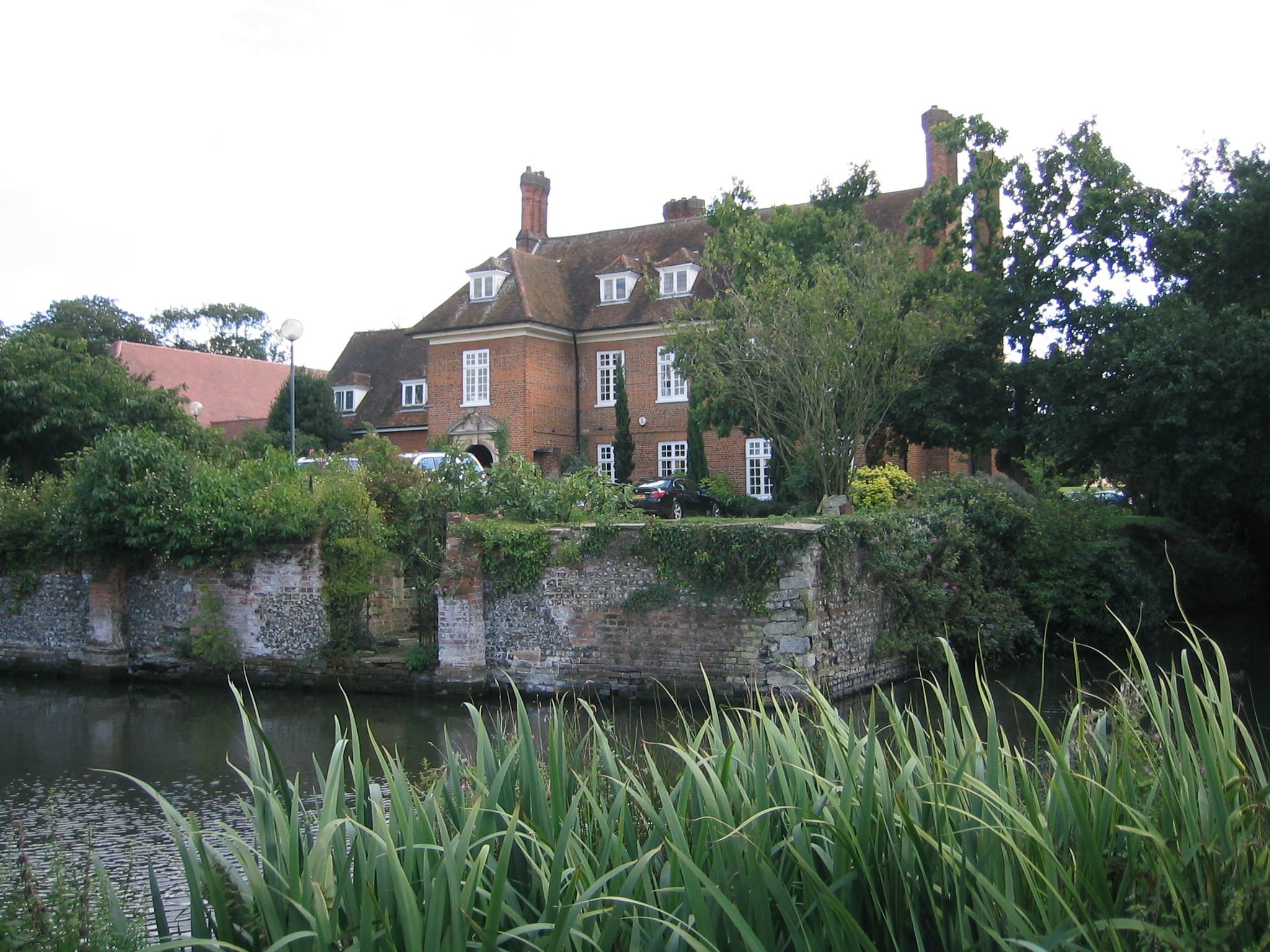
Salisbury Hall, Gresley's home during the 1930s

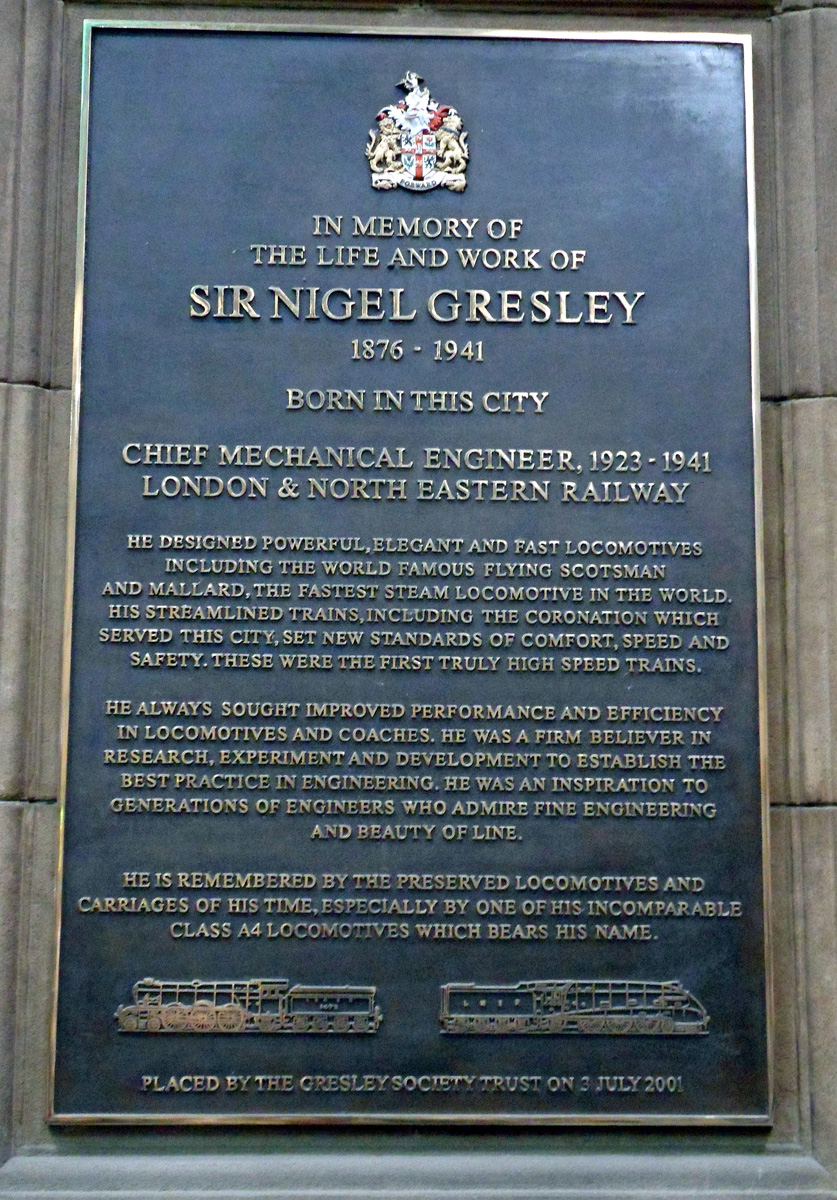
Memorial plaque to Gresley's achievements displayed in the main hall of Edinburgh's Waverley railway station

Gresley was born in Edinburgh, Scotland, during his mother's visit there to see a gynaecologist, but was raised in England at Netherseal, Derbyshire, a member of a cadet branch of a family long seated at Gresley, Derbyshire. After attending school in Sussex and at Marlborough College, Gresley served his apprenticeship at the Crewe works of the London and North Western Railway, afterwards becoming a pupil under John Aspinall at Horwich of the Lancashire and Yorkshire Railway (L&YR). After several minor appointments with the L&YR he was made Outdoor Assistant in the Carriage and Wagon Department in 1901; in 1902 he was appointed Assistant Works Manager at Newton Heath depot, and Works Manager the following year.

In 1901 he married Ethel Frances Fullagar. They had two sons and two daughters. Ethel died in 1929.

He became Assistant Superintendent of the Carriage and Wagon Department of the L&YR in 1904 and a year later moved to the Great Northern Railway (GNR) as Carriage and Wagon Superintendent. He succeeded Henry A. Ivatt as CME of the GNR on 1 October 1911. At the 1923 Grouping, he was appointed CME of the newly formed LNER (the post had originally been offered to the ageing John G. Robinson; Robinson declined and suggested the much younger Gresley).

During the 1930s, Sir Nigel Gresley lived at Salisbury Hall, near St Albans in Hertfordshire. Gresley developed an interest in breeding wild birds and ducks in the moat including Mallard ducks. The Hall still exists today as a private residence and is adjacent to the de Havilland Aircraft Museum, with its links to the design of the famous Mosquito aircraft during World War II.

In 1936, Gresley designed the 1,500 V DC locomotives for the proposed electrification of the Woodhead Line between Manchester and Sheffield. The Second World War forced the postponement of the project, which was completed in the early 1950s. Edgar Claxton was Gresley's assistant throughout this project, working on power supply, equipment and systems, besides carrying out the trials.

Gresley was appointed CBE in 1920 for services during the First World War and was knighted in the 1936 Birthday Honours by King Edward VIII. Also in the latter year, Gresley was awarded an honorary DSc by Manchester University and presided over the IMechE.

Gresley died on 5 April 1941, after a short illness, and was buried in the Churchyard Extension of St Peter's Church, Netherseal, Derbyshire. At this time, Gresley was serving as a Lieutenant Colonel in the Royal Engineers Railway Staff Corps.

He was succeeded as the LNER CME by Edward Thompson.

== Memorials ==
A memorial plaque to Gresley's achievements was unveiled at Edinburgh Waverley railway station in 2001. It was created by the Gresley Society and incorporates line drawings of his Flying Scotsman and Mallard locomotives.

Following the redevelopment of the site previously home to Doncaster College, the square outside the new Doncaster Metropolitan Borough Council Offices and Cast Theatre was named Sir Nigel Gresley Square, in honour of the designer of some of the most famous steam locomotives built at Doncaster Plant Works following a public poll of Doncaster residents. Sir Nigel Gresley Square was opened to the public in May 2012 as part of the Queen's Diamond Jubilee celebrations, by the Mayor of Doncaster Mr. Peter Davies and two of Nigel Gresley's grandsons.

One A4 class locomotive, no. 4498 Sir Nigel Gresley, was named after its designer. Built in November 1937, it was the one-hundredth Gresley pacific.

A statue of Gresley was unveiled at King's Cross station in London on 5 April 2016, the 75th anniversary of his death. Sculptor Hazel Reeves originally included a duck alongside Gresley in reference to his hobby of breeding water fowl and his bird-themed locomotive names such as Mallard, but this was removed from the final design when two of Gresley's grandsons complained it was "demeaning".

The Wetherspoons public house in Swadlincote, Derbyshire, is named The Sir Nigel Gresley in his honour.

He was inducted into the Scottish Engineering Hall of Fame in 2023.

A plaque honouring Gresley was unveiled in the entrance to Doncaster station on 19 June 2025, the 149th anniversary of his birth.

== Innovations ==
- Derived valve motion for 3-cylinder steam locomotives; Gresley Conjugated Valve Gear.
- The largest passenger steam locomotive in the UK, the P2 2-8-2.
- The largest steam locomotive in the UK, the U1 2-8-0+0-8-2 Garratt locomotive.
- The "locomotive that won the war", the V2 2-6-2.
- The first steam locomotive to officially achieve 100 mph, the A3 "Flying Scotsman" 4-6-2.
- The fastest steam locomotive in the world, the A4 "Mallard" 4-6-2 (126.3 mph).
- Another A4, "Silver Link", previously holding the world speed record for steam locomotives (112 mph)
- The experimental high-pressure LNER Class W1 "hush-hush" 4-6-4 locomotive
- The Silver Jubilee Express
- The articulated railway carriage, first used with some conversions of East Coast Joint Stock (ECJS) carriages in 1907, soon followed by conversions of GNR carriages; new articulated carriages being built for the GNR from 1911.
- The corridor tender to allow longer non-stop running

== Locomotives designed by Gresley ==
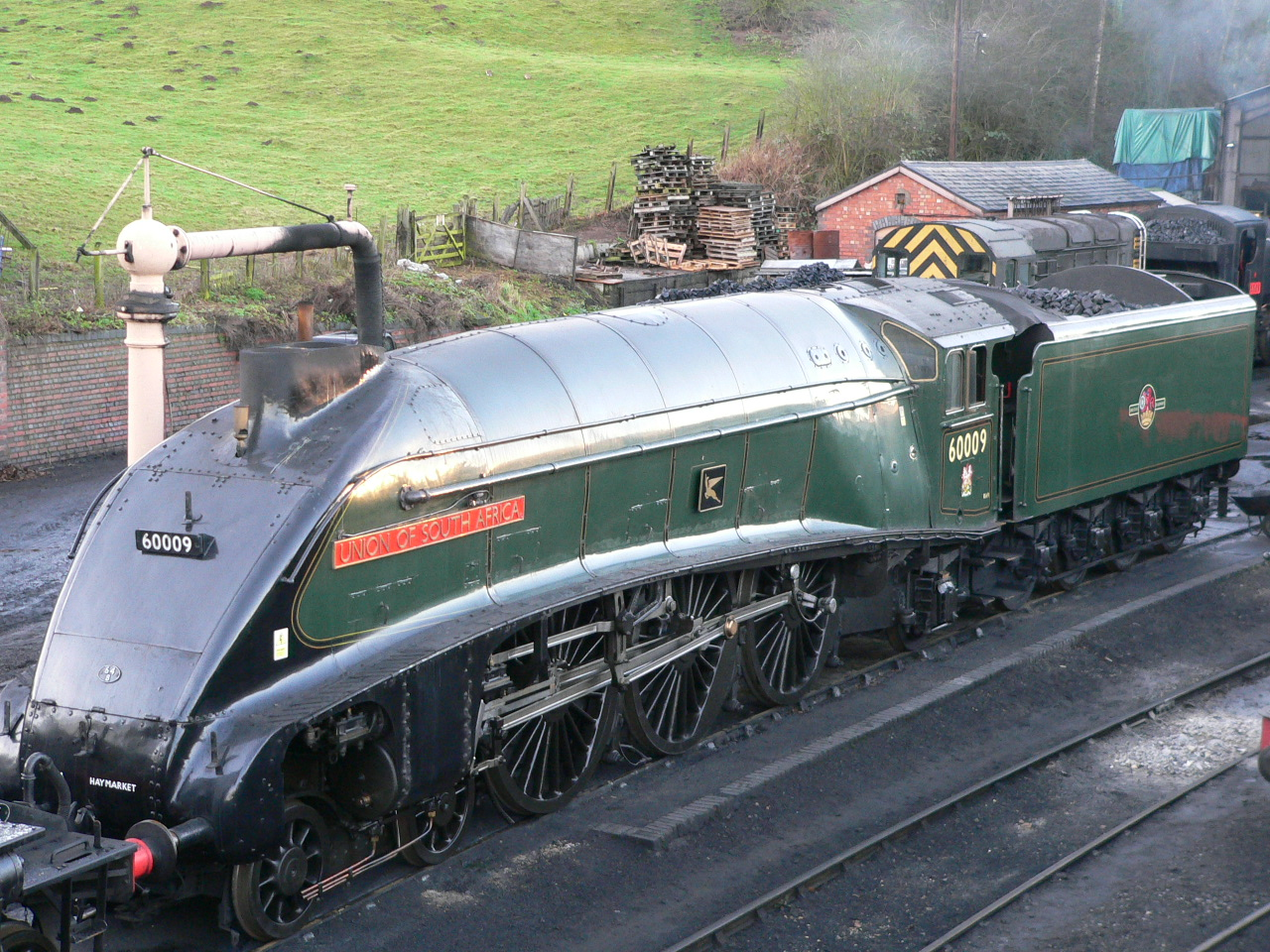
LNER Class A4 4488 Union of South Africa, a classic Gresley design, on the Severn Valley Railway in 2004

=== GNR ===
See: Locomotives of the Great Northern Railway

- GNR 536 Class (LNER Class J6) 0-6-0 (1911)
- GNR Class H2 (LNER Class K1) 2-6-0 (1912)
- GNR Class J21 (LNER Class J2) 0-6-0 (1912)
- GNR Class O1 (LNER Class O3) 2-8-0 (1913)
- GNR Class H3 (LNER Class K2) 2-6-0 (1914)
- GNR Class J23 (LNER Class J51) 0-6-0T (1915)
- GNR Class H4 (LNER Class K3) 2-6-0 (1920)
- GNR Class N2 0-6-2T (1920)
- GNR Class O2 2-8-0 (1921)
- GNR Class J23 (LNER Class J50) 0-6-0T (1922)
- GNR Class A1 4-6-2 (1922)

=== LNER ===
See: Locomotives of the London and North Eastern Railway

- LNER Class P1 2-8-2 (1925)
- LNER Class U1 Garratt 2-8-0+0-8-2 (1925)
- LNER Class J38 0-6-0 (1926)
- LNER Class J39 0-6-0 (1926)
- LNER Class A3 4-6-2 (1927)
- LNER Class D49 4-4-0 (1927)
- LNER Class B17 4-6-0 (1928)
- LNER Class W1 4-6-4 (1929)
- LNER Class V1 2-6-2T (1930)
- LNER Class P2 2-8-2 (1934)
- LNER Class A4 4-6-2 (1935)
- LNER Class V2 2-6-2 (1936)
- LNER Class K4 2-6-0 (1937)
- LNER Class V3 2-6-2T (1939)
- LNER Class V4 2-6-2 (1941)
- LNER No. 6701 Bo+Bo electric locomotive (1941)

== Arms ==
Coat of arms of Nigel Gresley
Notes Sir Nigel was an agnate of the Gresley baronets. Crest A lion passant Ermine armed langued and collared Gules. Escutcheon Vaire Ermine and Gules. Motto Meliore Fide Quam (More Faithful Than Fortunate)

Business positions
Preceded by Henry Ivatt	Chief Mechanical Engineer of the Great Northern Railway; 1911–1922	Succeeded by (LNER)
Preceded by (GNR)	Chief Mechanical Engineer of the London and North Eastern Railway; 1923–1941	Succeeded by Edward Thompson
Professional and academic associations
Preceded by Major-General Alexander Elliott Davidson	President of the Institution of Mechanical Engineers; 1936	Succeeded by Sir John Thornycroft
