= GNR Class O2 =

British steam locomotive class (1918–1963)

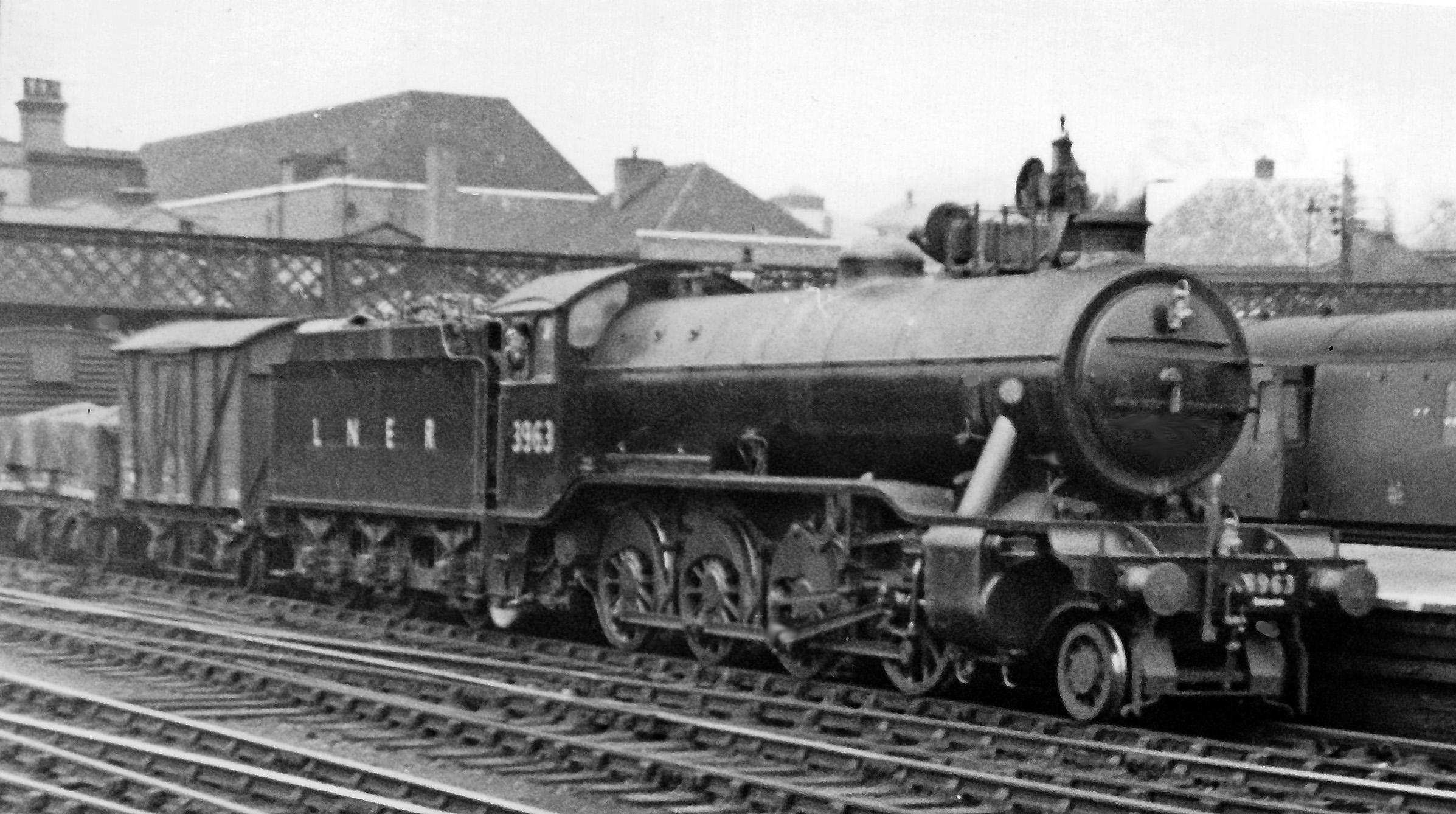
- O2/3 2-8-0 No. 3963 at Doncaster 1947
Type and origin
- Power type: Steam
- Designer: Nigel Gresley
- Builder: Doncaster Works (57); North British Locomotive Co. (10)
- Build date: 1918, 1921 – 1943
- Total produced: 67
Specifications
- Configuration
  - Whyte: 2-8-0
  - UIC: 1'Dh3
- Gauge: 4 ft 8 1/2 in (1,435 mm)
- Leading dia.: 2 ft 8 in (0.81 m)
- Coupled dia.: 4 ft 8 in (1.42 m)
- Length: 63 ft 3 in (19.28 m)
- Width: 8 ft 9 in (2.67 m)
- Height: 12 ft 11.25 in (3.9434 m)
- Loco weight: 74.1–78.65 long tons (75.29–79.91 t)
- Tender weight: 43.1–52 long tons (43.8–52.8 t)
- Fuel type: Coal
- Firebox
  - Grate area: 27.5 sq ft (2.55 m^{2})
- Boiler
  - Diameter: 5 ft 4.75 in (1,644.6 mm) or 5 ft 6 in (1,680 mm)
- Boiler pressure: 180 lbf/in^{2} (1.24 MPa)
- Heating surface: 2,032 sq ft (188.8 m^{2})
- Superheater
  - Heating area: 430.5 sq ft (39.99 m^{2})
- Cylinders: Three
- Cylinder size: 18 1/2 in × 26 in (470 mm × 660 mm)
- Valve gear: Outside: Walschaerts; Inside: Gresley conjugated
- Valve type: 8-inch (203 mm) piston valves
Performance figures
- Tractive effort: 36,740 lbf (163.4 kN)
Career
- Operators: Great Northern Railway; London and North Eastern Railway; British Railways
- Power class: BR: 8F
- Numbers: GNR: 461, LNER: 3921-3987, BR: 63921-63987
- Locale: Eastern Region
- Withdrawn: 1948, 1960 – 1963
- Disposition: All scrapped

The Great Northern Railway (GNR) Class O2 was a class of three-cylinder 2-8-0 steam locomotives designed by Nigel Gresley for freight work and built by the GNR from 1921. Further examples were built by the London and North Eastern Railway (LNER) from 1924.

== Sub-classes ==
The LNER created four subclasses:

- O2/1, Introduced 1921. Development of experimental Gresley GNR 3-cylinder locomotive (LNER 3921). Subsequently rebuilt with side-window cab and reduced boiler mountings.
- O2/2, Introduced 1924. Development of O2/1 with detail differences.
- O2/3, Introduced 1932. Development of O2/2 with side-window cab and reduced boiler mountings.
- O2/4, Introduced 1943. Rebuilt with 100A (B1 type) boiler and smokebox extended backwards.

== GNR ==
The first models of this class were designed and built under GNR ownership, the first locomotive, 461, was built in May 1918. A batch of ten further O2s was built by the North British Locomotive Co. in 1921.

== LNER ==
Fifteen more O2s were built immediately after the Grouping in 1923. Sixteen more were delivered in 1932 and 1933. Wartime requirements led to the construction of 25 from 1942 to 43 in three batches.

== British Railways ==
All 67 locomotives passed to British Railways (BR) in 1948 and were given BR Numbers 63921–63987, but 63921 (which was the prototype 461, LNER 3921) was quickly scrapped. They served all across the former LNER from Stratford through East Anglia into the East Midlands, primarily hauling coal and iron ore trains. By winter 1955/56, they had all gravitated to Doncaster (36A - 35 locomotives), Grantham (35B - 14 locomotives) and Retford (36E - 17 locomotives). By winter 1962, they were down to 52 locomotives still in much the same locations, the following having been scrapped: 63929/34/44/47/50-55/57-59/70.

By the end of 1963, all members of the class had been scrapped.

== Gallery ==
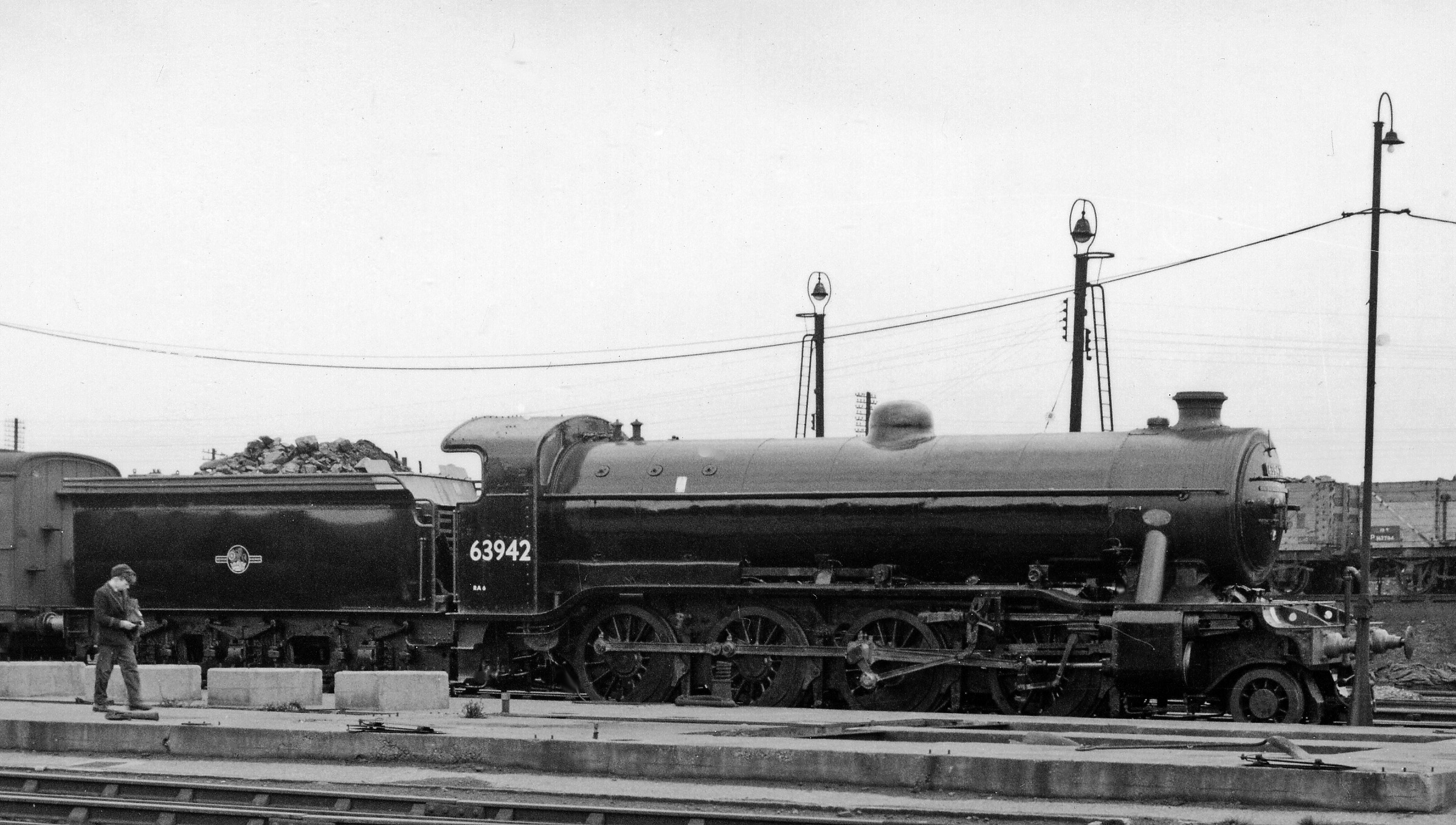
O2/2 63942 at Doncaster 1961

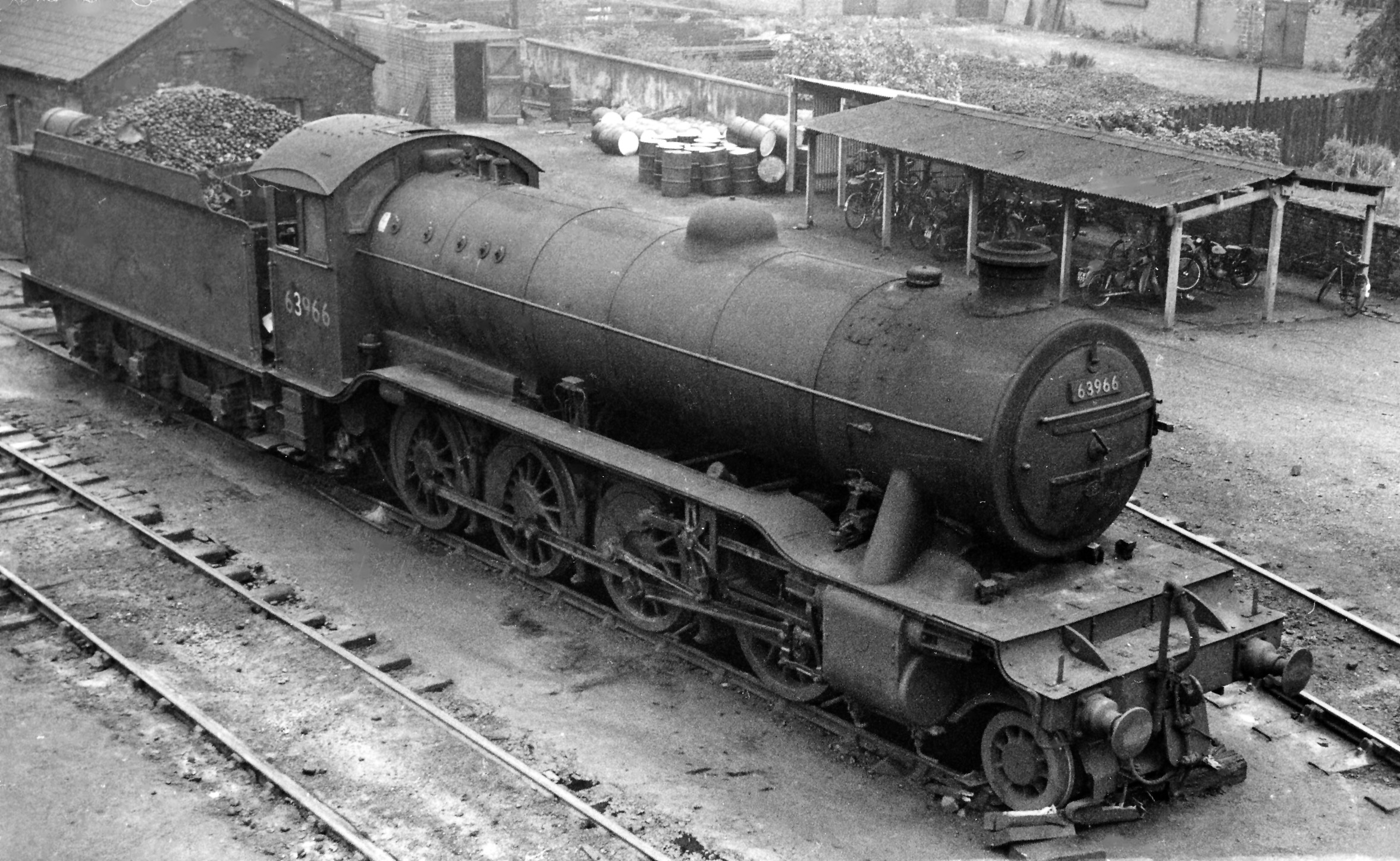
O2/4 No. 63966 with side-window cab, band 100A boiler at Retford Locomotive Depot 1962
