= LNER Class J38 =

Class of 35 two-cylinder locomotives

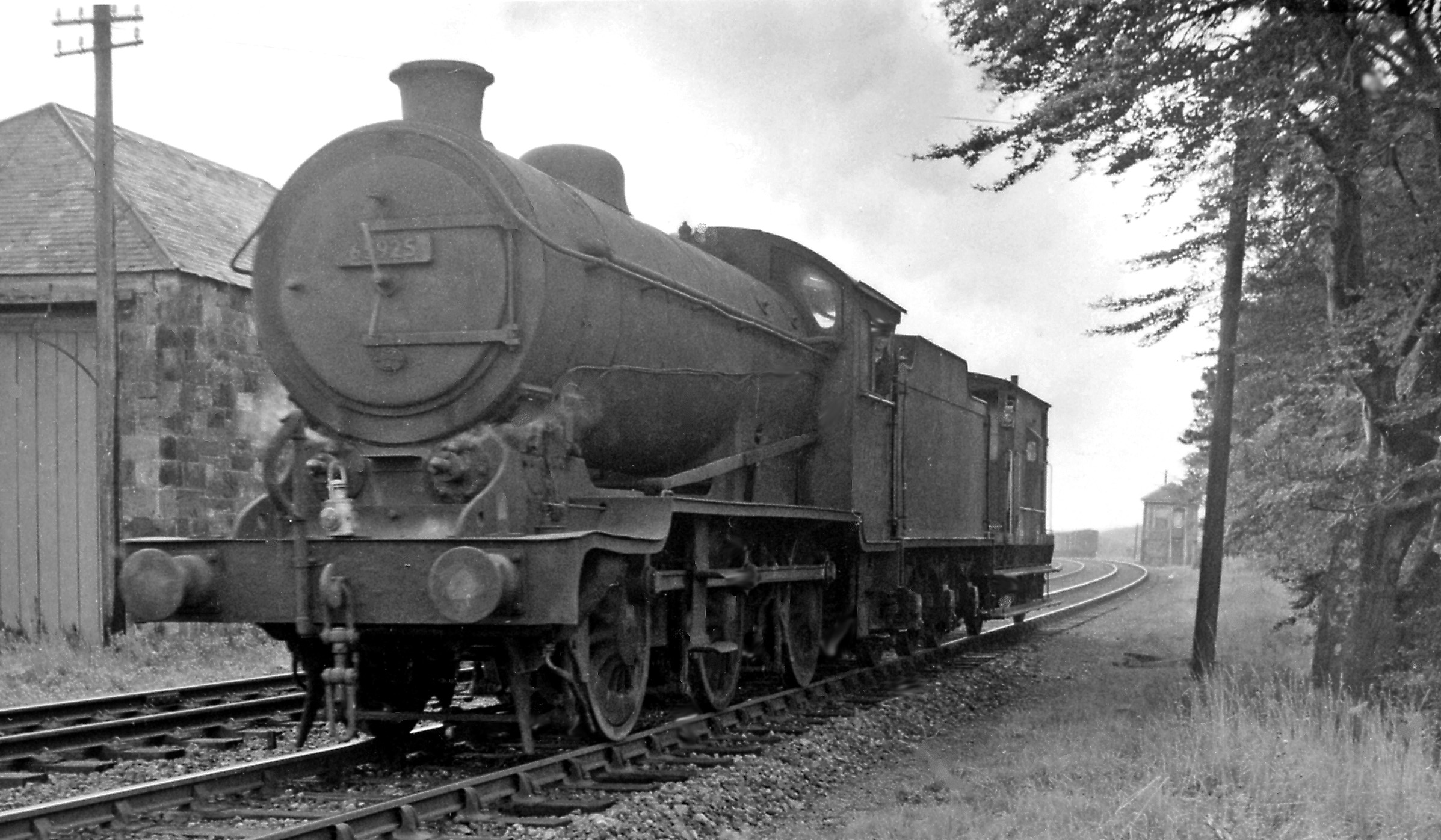
- A Gresley J38 0-6-0 at the site of Forest Mill station
Type and origin
- Power type: Steam
- Designer: Nigel Gresley
- Build date: 1926
- Total produced: 35
Specifications
- Configuration
  - Whyte: 0-6-0
  - UIC: Ch2g
- Gauge: 4 ft 8 1/2 in (1,435 mm) standard gauge
- Driver dia.: 56 in (1.422 m)
- Loco weight: 58.95 long tons (59.90 t; 66.02 short tons)
- Total weight: 103.15 long tons (104.81 t; 115.53 short tons)
- Fuel type: Coal
- Boiler pressure: 180 psi (1.24 MPa)
- Cylinders: Two, inside
- Cylinder size: 20 in × 26 in (508 mm × 660 mm)
- Valve gear: Stephenson
- Valve type: piston valves
Performance figures
- Tractive effort: 28,415 lbf (126.40 kN)
Career
- Operators: London and North Eastern Railway; British Railways
- Class: LNER: J38
- Power class: BR: 6F
- Retired: 1962–1967
- Disposition: All scrapped

The London and North Eastern Railway Class J38 was a class of steam locomotive designed for freight transport. They were designed by Nigel Gresley and introduced in 1926. A total of 35 were built at the LNER's Darlington Works in 1926 and they were used in Scotland. All passed into British Railways ownership in 1948 and they were renumbered from 5900–5934 to 65900–65934.

The far more numerous J39 class was a later development, exchanging the J38's 4 ft 8 in (1.422 m) driving wheels with larger 5 ft 2 in (1.575 m). Some of the J38s were later rebuilt with J39 boilers.

== Dimensions ==
- BR Power classification: 6F
- Locomotive weight: 58 long tons 19 cwt (132,000 lb or 59.9 t)
- Tender weight: 44 long tons 4 cwt (99,000 lb or 44.9 t)
- Boiler pressure: 180 psi (1,200 kPa)
- Superheater: Yes
- Cylinders: 20 in × 26 in (508 mm × 660 mm)
- Driving wheel diameter: 4 ft 8 in (1.422 m)
- Tractive effort: 28,415 lbf (126,400 N)
- Valve gear: Stephenson
  - piston valves

== Withdrawal ==
All J38s were withdrawn between 1962 and 1967, with the last two in service being No. 65901 and No. 65929. These two engines were the last Gresley-designed steam locomotives in service, and all were scrapped.

== Sources ==
- Ian Allan ABC of British Railways Locomotives (1962 ed.).
