= Locomotives of the London, Tilbury and Southend Railway =

From its opening in 1854, the London, Tilbury and Southend Railway (LTSR) hired locomotives from the Eastern Counties Railway (ECR), and this arrangement continued after the ECR amalgamated with other railways in 1862 to create the Great Eastern Railway (GER). In 1880 the LTSR bought its first locomotive, saving on hiring costs from the GER and further engines followed that year. The LTSR principally operated tank engines, which it named after towns on the route. The railway's first locomotive superintendent was Thomas Whitelegg, who in 1910 was succeeded by his son Robert. The LTSR became part of the Midland Railway (MR) in 1912, but nevertheless continued to be operated independently. The Midland removed locomotive names and renumbered engines. The Midland, and its successor the London, Midland and Scottish Railway (LMS), continued to build some LTSR designs until 1930.

== Locomotive classes ==
Steam locomotives are divided into the following classes:

LT&SR class	LT&SR Nos.	MR Nos.	Type	Quantity	Manufacturer	Date	Withdrawn	Notes
1	1–36	2110–2145	4-4-2T	36	Sharp, Stewart & Co. (30); Nasmyth, Wilson & Co. (6)	1880–1892	1929–1936	
37	37–48	2146–2157	4-4-2T	12	Sharp, Stewart & Co. (6); Dübs & Co. (6)	1897–1898	1951–1952	
49	49–50	2898–2899	0-6-0	2	Sharp, Stewart & Co.	1899	1933, 1936	
51	51–68	2158–2175	4-4-2T	18	Sharp, Stewart & Co. (12); North British Locomotive Co. (6)	1900–1903	1947–1953	
69	69–78	2180–2189	0-6-2T	10	North British Locomotive Co.	1903–1908	1958–1962	
79	79–82	2176–2179	4-4-2T	4	Robert Stephenson & Co.	1909	1951–1956	
Locomotives built to LT&SR designs after 1912
(69)	(83–86)	2190–2193	0-6-2T	4	Beyer, Peacock & Co.	1912	1959	Ordered by the LT&SR
(87)	(87–94)	2100–2107	4-6-4T	8	Beyer, Peacock & Co.	1912	1929–1934	Ordered by the LT&SR
(79)	—	LMS 2110–2119	4-4-2T	10	Derby Works	1923	1951–1959	Ordered by the Midland Railway
(79)	—	LMS 2120–2124	4-4-2T	6	Nasmyth, Wilson & Co.	1925	1952–1959	Ordered by the LMS
(79)	—	LMS 2125–2134	4-4-2T	10	Derby Works	1927	1956–1960	Ordered by the LMS
(79)	—	LMS 2151–2160	4-4-2T	10	Derby Works	1930	1955–1959	Ordered by the LMS

The LTSR 37, 51, and 79 classes were similar, with the 51 class being lighter (67.80 long tons or 68.89 tonnes) than the other two (71.50–71.75 long tons or 72.65–72.90 tonnes).

== Preservation ==
Only one LT&SR locomotive has survived into preservation:

Image	LTSR No.	LTSR class	Type	Manufacturer	Serial No.	Date	Notes
	80 Thundersley	79	4-4-2T	Robert Stephenson & Co.	3367	May; 1909	National collection; static display, Bressingham Steam and Gardens
