= Nippon Railway =

Overview
- Headquarters: Tokyo
- Locale: Japan
- Dates of operation: 1883–1906
- Successor: Japanese Government Railways

Technical
- Track gauge: 3 ft 6 in (1,067 mm)
- Length: 1,385.3 kilometers (1906)

Nippon Railway (日本鉄道, Nippon Tetsudō) was the first private railway company in the history of Japan. The company built trunk lines connecting Tokyo with the Tōhoku region to the northeast. Most of its lines came under the control of Japanese Government Railways following nationalization in 1906, and many are now operated by East Japan Railway Company.

== Outline ==
The company was incorporated in 1881 as the first privately funded railway company in Japan, where the railways had been built only by the imperial government since early 1870s. If, however, the definition of "railway" includes horsecars, Nippon Railway is behind Tokyo Bashatetsudō, established in 1880 as the first private railway in Japan.

Major investors to the company were kazoku, led by the highest-class court noble Iwakura Tomomi. The company, incorporated to help expansion of national railway network in line with the national policy, received strong support from the government, both technically and financially.

The first 38 miles (61 km) of the railway, between Ueno Station in Tokyo and Kumagaya Station in Kumagaya, Saitama, opened on July 28, 1883. The mainline to Aomori was completed in 1891.

The company expanded the railway by means of both construction and acquisition of other companies. As of 1906, it operated 860.8 miles (1,385.3 km) of railways including the present-day Tōhoku Main Line, Jōban Line, Takasaki Line and Yamanote Line.

On November 1, 1906, the entire operation of the company was purchased by the government of Japan under the Railway Nationalization Act. Consequently, the company was dissolved.

== List of lines ==
Operation of Nippon Railway as of October 31, 1906
Endpoints	Length (kilometers)	Line names (designated after nationalization)	Notes
Ueno – Aomori	735.3	Tōhoku Main Line	
Nippori – Mikawashima	1.3	Jōban Line	
Ōmiya – Maebashi	84.5	Takasaki Line, Ryōmō Line	
Oyama – Maebashi	81.9	Ryōmō Line	
Oyama – Tomobe	50.5	Mito Line	
Tabata – Iwanuma	343.8	Jōban Line	
Tabata – Ikebukuro	5.3	Yamanote Line	
Shinagawa – Akabane	20.9	Yamanote Line, Akabane Line	
Utsunomiya – Nikkō	40.2	Nikkō Line	
Iwakiri – Shiogama	6.9	Shiogama Line	
Shiriuchi (present-day Hachinohe) – Minato	8.2	Hachinohe Line	
Ueno – Akihabara	1.9	Tōhoku Main Line	Freight
Mikawashima – Sumidagawa	3.2	Jōban Line	Freight
Mito – Nakagawa	1.3	Jōban Line	Freight
Total	1,385.3		

== Rolling stock ==
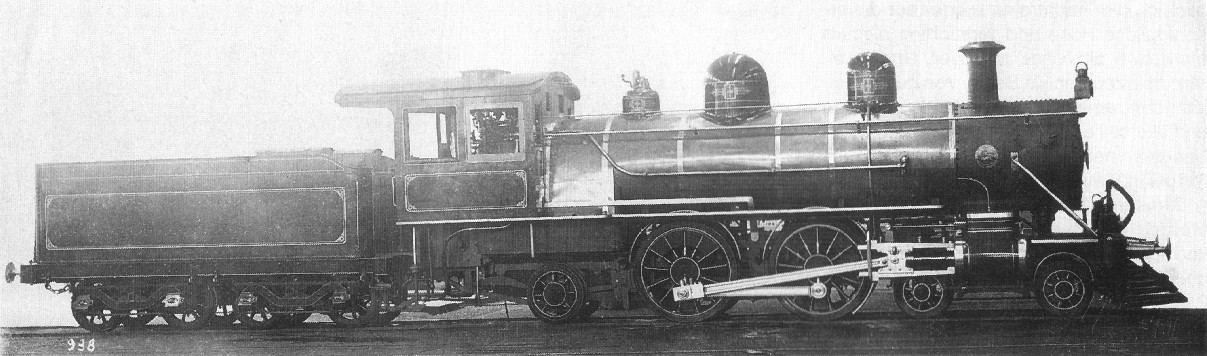
Baldwin built Bbt2/5 (JGR Class 6600) were the only Atlantics to operate in Japan

Fleet of Nippon Railway
Year	Steam locomotives	Passenger cars	Freight cars etc.	
Year	Steam locomotives	Passenger cars	Wagons	Trucks
1890	54	158	763	
1900	286	824	1,646	1,957
1905	356	857	2,345	3,386

Nippon Railway Steam Locomotives
Class	Road numbers	Wheel arrangement	Total	Builder	Build year	Works numbers	JGR Class and numbers (1909)
B3/5	501-503	2-6-2T	3	Baldwin	1893	13776, 13777, 13780	Class 3250 3250-3252
B3/5	504	2-6-2T	1	Baldwin	1893	13781	Class 3390 3390
B3/5	505	2-6-2T	1	Baldwin	1893	13782	Class 3250 3253
Bbt2/5	506-529	4-4-2	24	Baldwin	1897	15175-15198	Class 6600 6600-6623
Bt4/5	576-587	2-8-0	12	Baldwin	1906	28914-28917，28946-28947，28960-28965	Class 9300 9300-9311
Bt4/6	530-549	2-8-2	20	Baldwin	1897	15203-15222	Class 9700 9700-9719
D2/4	37-39	0-6-0T	3	Dübs	1888	2356-2358	Class 500 500-508
D2/4	66-71	0-6-0T	6	Dübs	1892	2874-2879	Class 500 500-508
D3/3	25-30	0-6-0T	6	Dübs	1887	2275-2280	Class 1850 1864-1881
D3/3	87-92	0-6-0T	6	Dübs	1894	3081-3086	Class 1850 1864-1881
D3/3	117-122	0-6-0T	6	Dübs	1896	3324-3329	Class 1850 1864-1881
D3/4	60-65	0-6-2T	6	Dübs	1891	2771-2776	Class 2100 2106-2111
Db3/6	201-204	4-6-2T	4	Dübs	1898	3653-3655, 3659	Class 3800 3800-3803
Dbt2/4	4-15	4-4-0	12	Dübs	1883	?	Class 5230 5230-5241
Dbt2/4	205-206	4-4-0	2	Dübs	1898	3657-3658	Class 5830 5830-5831
Dt3/4	326-331	0-6-2	6	Dübs	1902	4304-4309	Class 7050 7050-7055
H3/5	825-830	2-6-2T	6	Hanomag	1903	3046-3051	Class 3170 3170-3175
HS3/5	831-832	2-6-2T	2	Henschel	1904	6480-6481	Class 3240 3240-3241
M3/3	甲1	0-6-0T	1	Manning Wardle	1881	815	Class 1290 1292
Ma2/2+2/2	701	0-4-4-0	1	Maffei	1903	2314	Class 4500 4500
N3/3	105-116	0-6-0T	12	Neilson	1894	4776-4787	Class 1960 1960-1971
Nbt2/4	72-76	4-4-0	5	Neilson	1893	?	Class 5630 5636-5640
Nt3/4	77-86	2-6-0	10	Neilson	1893	4658 - 4665，4656，4657	Class 7750 7750-7759
NB3/4	833-844	0-6-2T	12	North British	1905	17021-17022, 17043-17052	Class 2120 2366-2377
NBt3/4	332-337	0-6-2	6	North British	1903	15951-15956	Class 7050 7056-7061
O3/3	401-406	0-6-0T	6	Ōmiya Works	1904	?	Class 1040 1040-1045
Obt2/4	3	4-4-0	1	Ōmiya Works	1901	1	Class 5270 5270
P3/3	123-128	0-6-0T	30	Dübs	1896	3802-3807	Class 1900 1900-1924
P3/3	129-152	0-6-0T	30	Dübs	1896	3828-3851	Class 1900 1900-1924
P3/5	801-824	2-6-2T	24	Beyer, Peacock	1904	4497-4520	Class 3200 3200-3223
Pbt2/4	1-2	4-4-0	2	Beyer, Peacock	1882	2161-2162	Class 5300 5312-5313
Pbt2/4	93-104	4-4-0	12	Beyer, Peacock	1894	3640-3651	Class 5500 5506-5565
Pbt2/4	153-188	4-4-0	36	Beyer, Peacock	1897	3889-3924	Class 5500 5506-5565
Pbt2/4	189-200	4-4-0	12	Beyer, Peacock	1898	4014-4025	Class 5500 5506-5565
Pbt2/4	213-218	4-4-0	6	Beyer, Peacock	1899	4038-4043	Class 5600 5600-5617
Pbt2/4	219-230	4-4-0	12	Beyer, Peacock	1902	4479-4490	Class 5600 5600-5617
Pt3/4	320-325	0-6-2	6	Beyer, Peacock	1902	4393-4398	Class 7080 7080-7085
Rt4/5	588-599	2-8-0	12	ALCo-Rogers	1906	41261-41272	Class 9400 9400-9411
S2/4	550-575	2-4-2T	26	Schenectady	1898	4863-4888	Class 900 900-925
SS2/3	16-17	2-4-0	2	Sharp, Stewart	1875	?	Class 140 140-141
SSbt2/4	207-212	4-4-2	6	Sharp, Stewart	1898	?	Class 5650 5650-5655
W2/4	18-19	2-4-2T	2	Nasmyth, Wilson	1895	467-468	Class 600 600-615
W2/4	31-36	2-4-2T	6	Nasmyth, Wilson	1887	326-331	Class 600 600-615
W2/4	40-41	2-4-2T	2	Nasmyth, Wilson	1888	342-434	Class 600 600-615
W2/4	42-47	2-4-2T	6	Nasmyth, Wilson	1889	383-388	Class 600 600-615
W2/4	48-53	2-4-2T	6	Nasmyth, Wilson	1890	396-401	Class 600 621, 616-620
W3/3	21-24	0-6-0T	4	Nasmyth, Wilson	1886-1898	524, 298, 307, 309	Class 1100 1105-1108
Wt3/4	54-59	2-6-0	6	Nasmyth, Wilson	1889	369-374	Class 7600 7600-7605
