= Ome Railway Park =

Railway museum in Ōme, Tokyo, Japan

Coordinates: 35.7923°N 139.2633°E

- 青梅鉄道公園
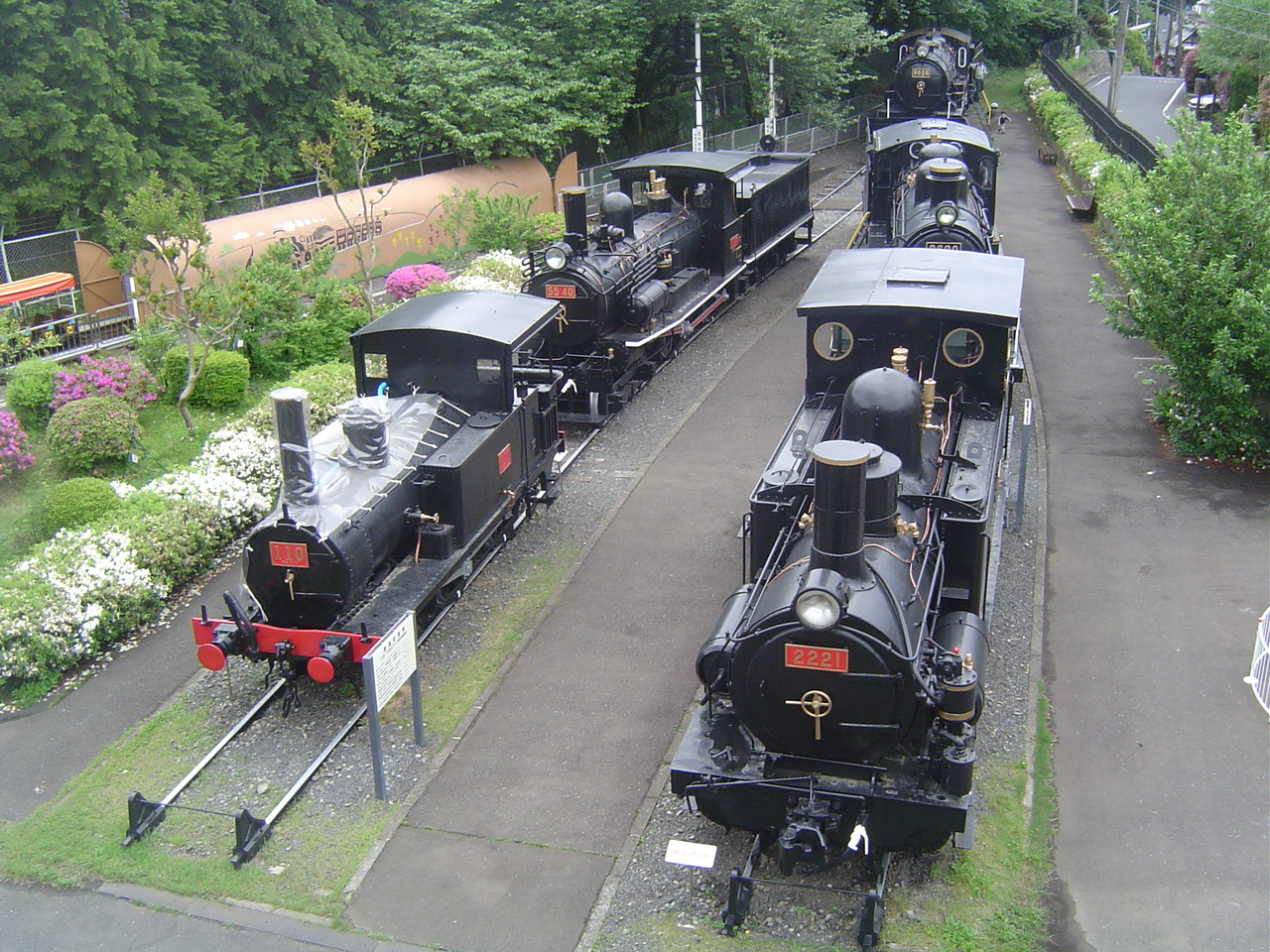
- Established: 1962
- Location: Ōme, Tokyo Japan
- Type: Railway museum
- Public transit access: Ōme Station
- Website: www.ejrcf.or.jp/ome/english/index.html

The Ome Railway Park (青梅鉄道公園, Ōme Tetsudō Kōen) is a railway museum in Ōme, Tokyo, Japan. It opened in 1962, and is operated by the East Japan Railway Culture Foundation, a foundation established by East Japan Railway Company.

== Exhibits ==
Seven steam locomotives, one electric locomotive and one 0 Series Shinkansen EMU car are on display. (as of July 2023)

Category	Number	Class	Builder	Year built	Image
Steam	2221	JGR Class 2120	North British Locomotive Company, Scotland	1905	
Steam	5540	JGR Class 5500	Beyer, Peacock & Company, England	1897	
Steam	8620	JGR Class 8620	Kisha Seizo, Japan	1914	
Steam	9608	JNR Class 9600	Kawasaki, Japan	1913	
Steam	C11 1	JNR Class C11	Kisha Seizo, Japan	1932	
Steam	D51 452	JNR Class D51	Kisha Seizo, Japan	1939	
Steam	E10 2	JNR Class E10	Kisha Seizo, Japan	1948	
Electric	ED16 1	JNR Class ED16	Mitsubishi, Japan	1936	
Shinkansen	22-75	0 series	Kisha Seizo, Japan	1969	

- Shinkansen car 22-75 was repainted into Tohoku ivory/green livery for short period in late 1980s.
- JNR Class C51 steam locomotive No. C51 5 was also preserved here until it was moved to the Railway Museum in Saitama, Saitama.
- JGR Class 110 steam locomotive No. 110 was also sectioned and put on display here, until its sectioned part was restored was moved to CIAL Sakuragichō Station in June 2020.

== Access ==
The museum is located 15 minutes walk from Ome Station on the Ome Line.

=== Address ===
2-155 Katsunuma, Ōme, Tokyo
