= JNR Class C11 =

Class of Japanese 2-6-4T locomotives

Class C11
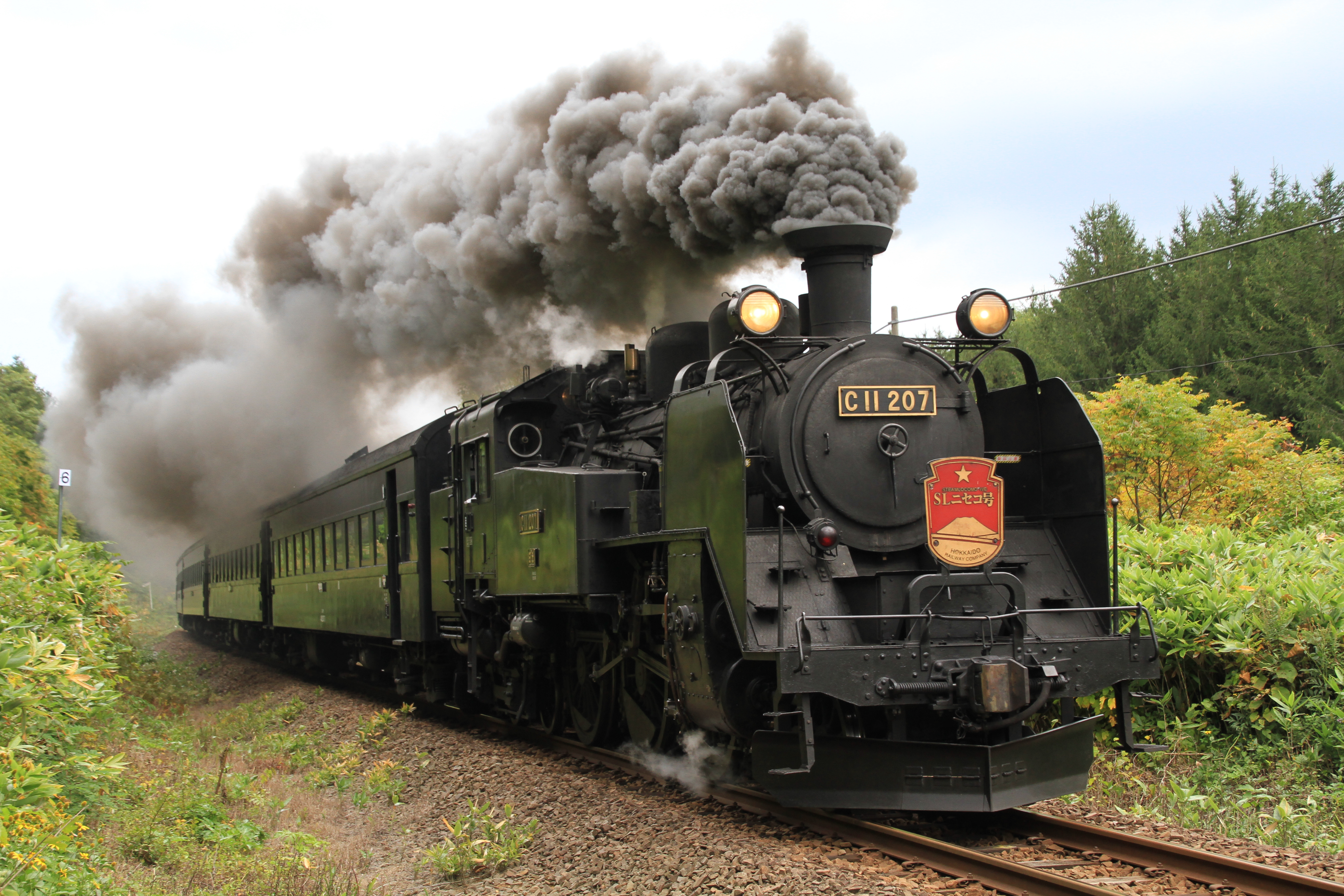
- JR Hokkaido C11 207 hauling a Niseko tourist service in September 2014
Type and origin
- Power type: Steam
- Designer: Hideo Shima
- Builder: Hitachi, Kisha, Kawasaki, Nippon Sharyo
- Build date: 1932-1947
- Total produced: 381
Specifications
- Configuration
  - Whyte: 2-6-4T
- Gauge: 1,067 mm (3 ft 6 in)
- Leading dia.: 860 mm (2 ft 10 in)
- Driver dia.: 1,520 mm (5 ft 0 in)
- Trailing dia.: 860 mm (2 ft 10 in)
- Length: 12,650 mm (41 ft 6 in)
- Width: 2,936 mm (9 ft 7.6 in)
- Height: 3,900 mm (12 ft 10 in)
- Loco weight: 66.05 t (72.81 short tons; 65.01 long tons)
- Fuel type: Coal
- Cylinders: 2
- Cylinder size: 450 mm × 610 mm (18 in × 24 in) (bore × stroke)
- Valve gear: Walschaerts
Performance figures
- Maximum speed: 85 km/h (53 mph)
- Tractive effort: 94.8 kN (21,300 lb_{f}) (Original Boiler Pressure); 101.6 kN (22,800 lb_{f}) (Increased Boiler Pressure)
Career
- Numbers: C11 1-C11 381
- Retired: 1971-1975
- Disposition: 52 preserved (6 operational), remainder scrapped

The Class C11 (C11形) is a type of 2-6-4T steam locomotive built by the Japanese Government Railways and the Japanese National Railways from 1932 to 1947. A total of 381 Class C11 locomotives were built and designed by Hideo Shima.

== Overview ==
The Class C11 was based on the earlier 2-6-4T Class C10 type built in 1930.

== Preserved examples ==
52 Class C11 locomotives are preserved, as listed below, with six in working order.

=== Operational ===
- C11 123: Operated by Tobu Railway in Tochigi Prefecture. Operating as SL Taiju. It was originally numbered C11 1 on a private railway.
- C11 171: Operated by JR Hokkaido and based at Asahikawa Depot
- C11 190: Operated by Oigawa Railway in Shizuoka Prefecture
- C11 207: Operated by Tobu Railway in Tochigi Prefecture. Operating as SL Taiju.
- C11 227: Operated by Oigawa Railway in Shizuoka Prefecture.
- C11 325: Operated by Tobu Railway in Tochigi Prefecture. Operating as SL Taiju.
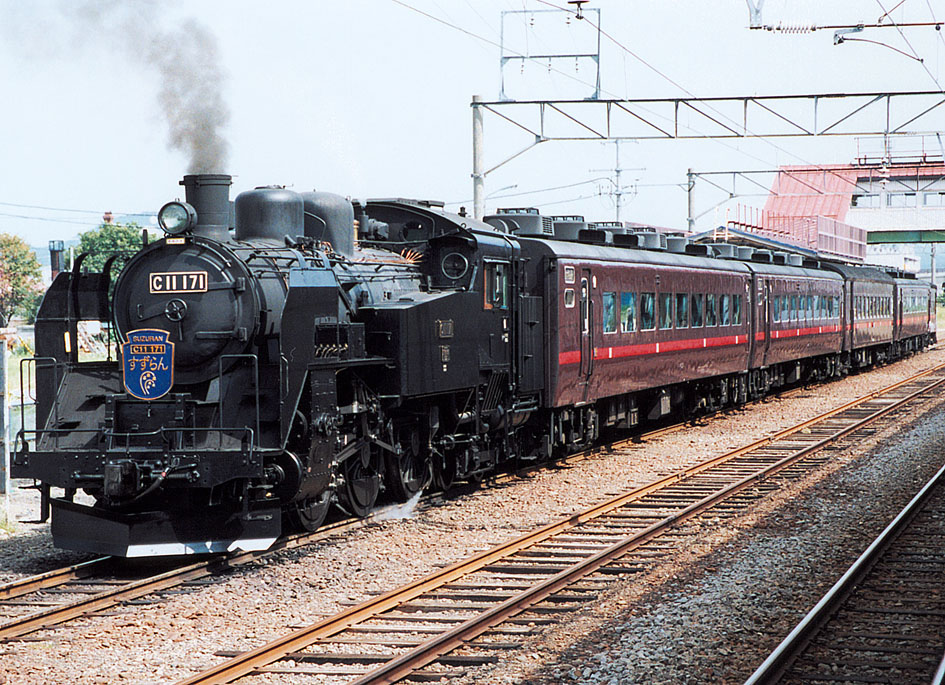
C11 171 in 2002

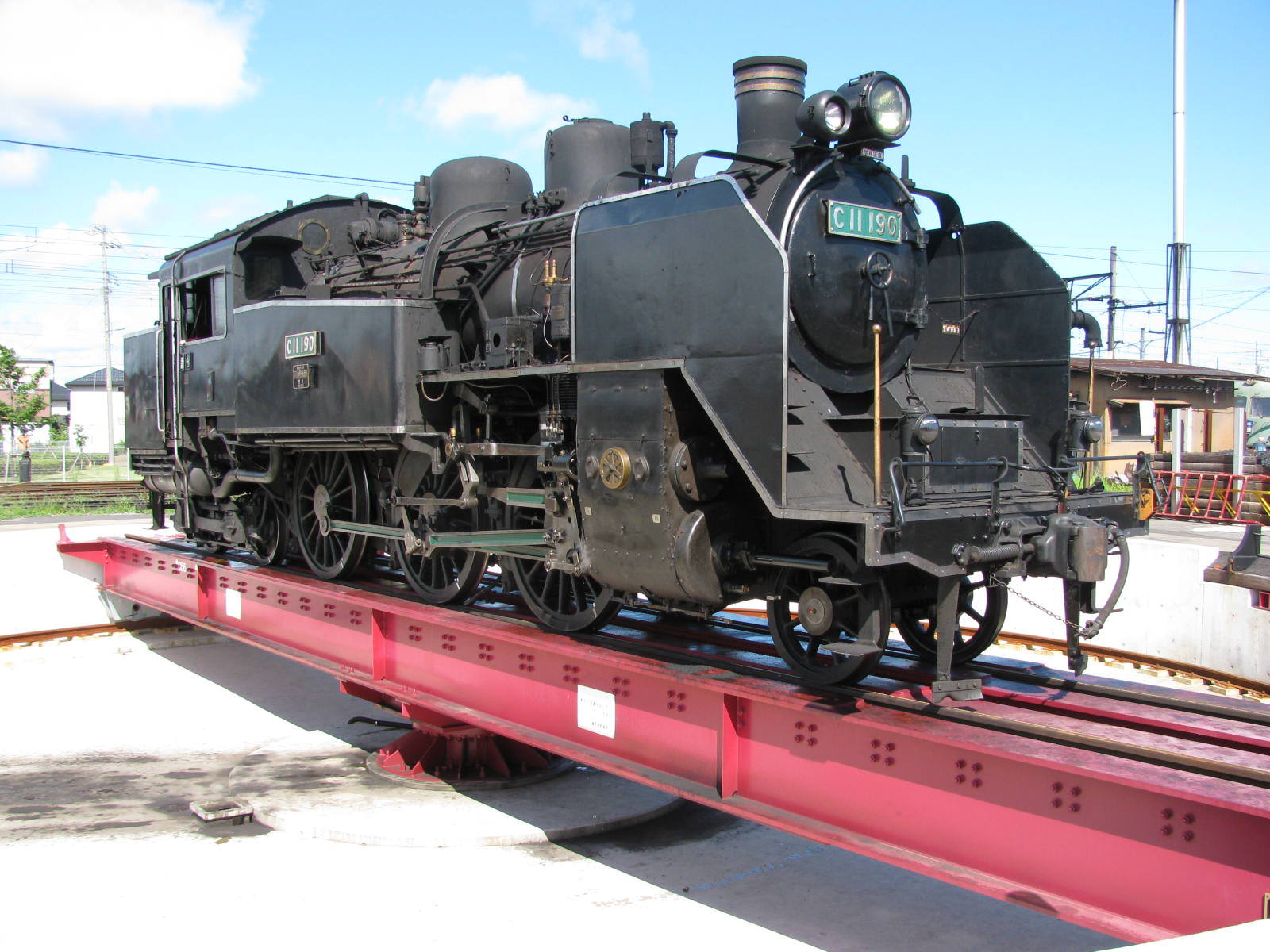
C11 190 in August 2012

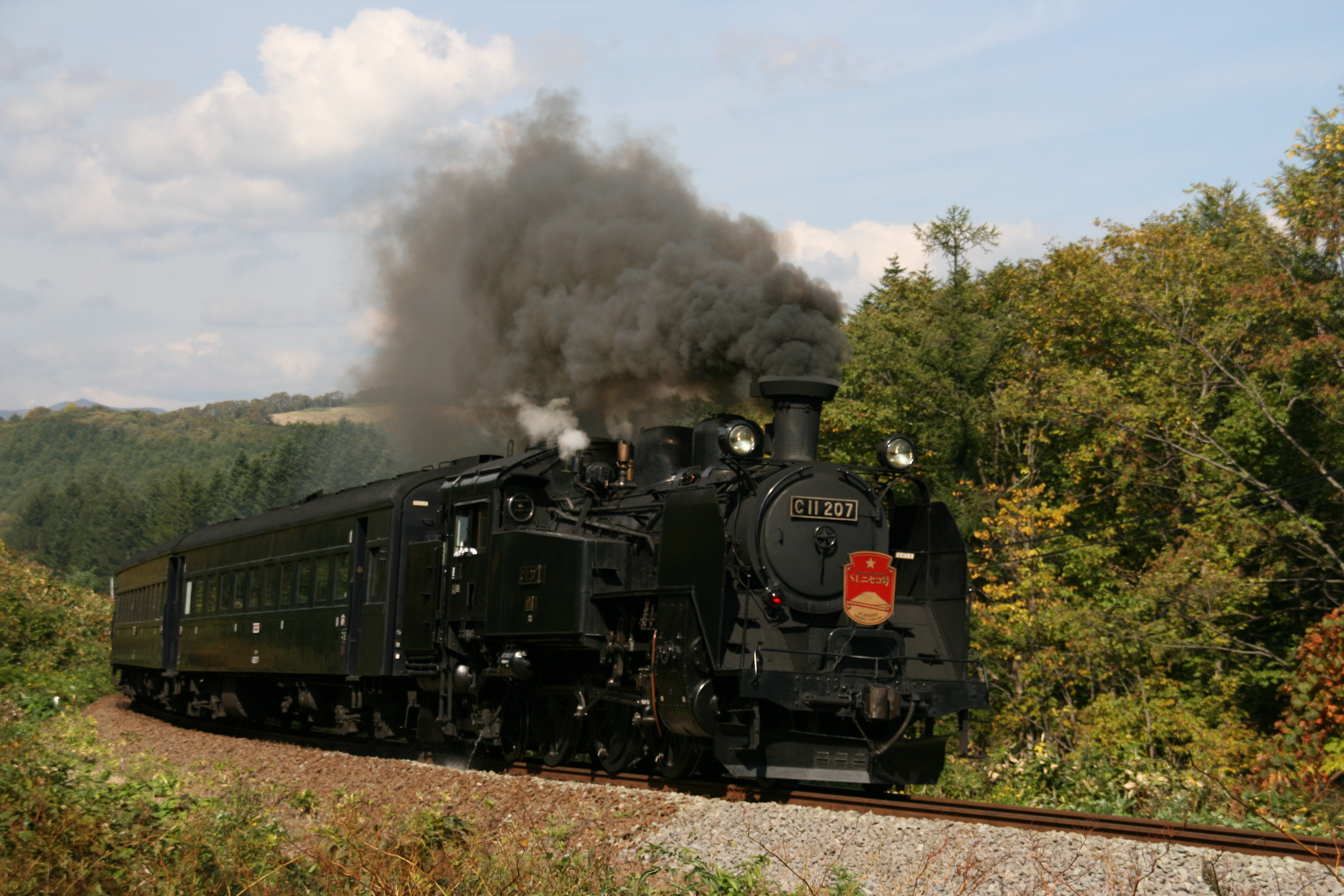
C11 207 in October 2007

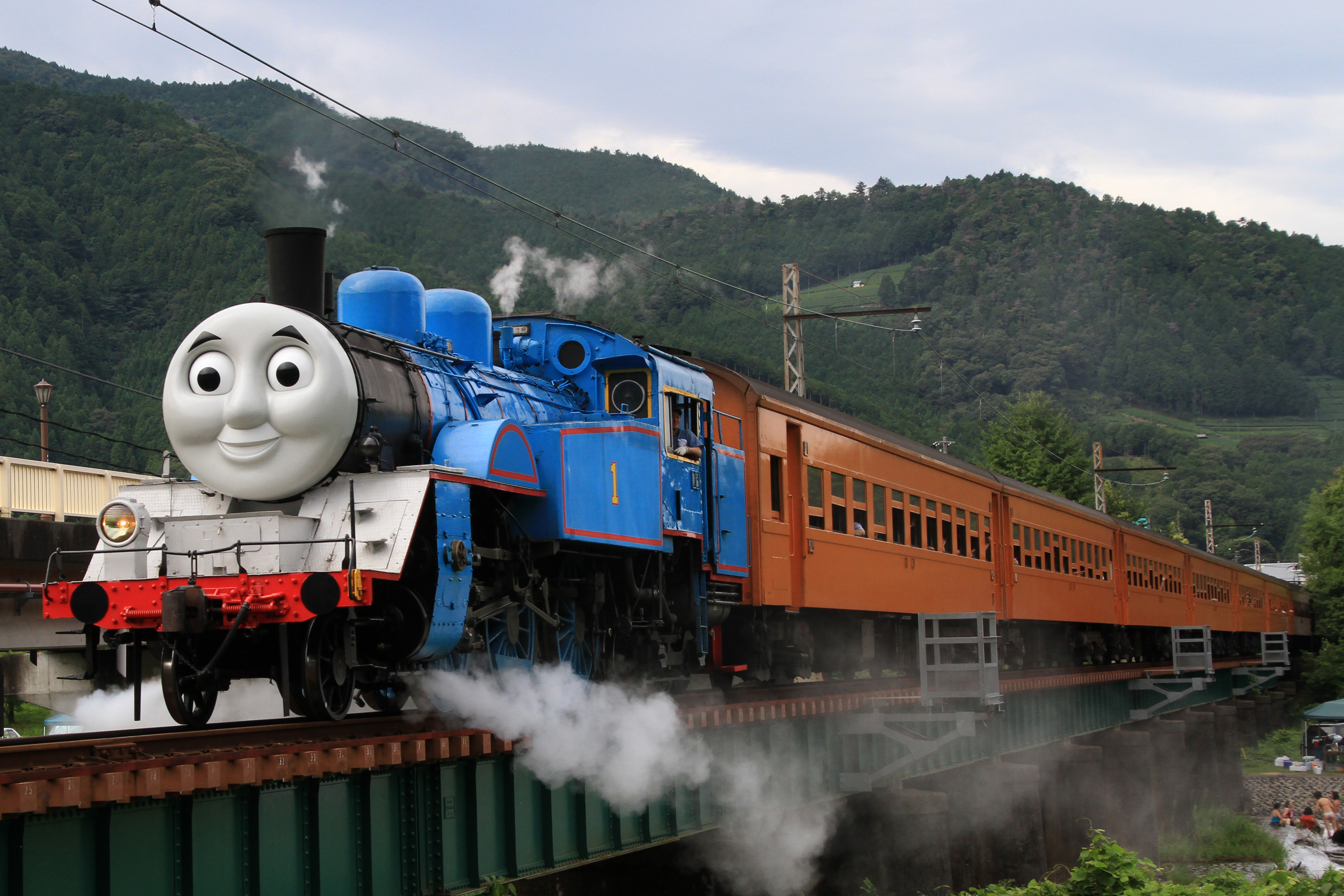
C11 227 repainted to look like Thomas the Tank Engine on the Oigawa Railway in August 2014

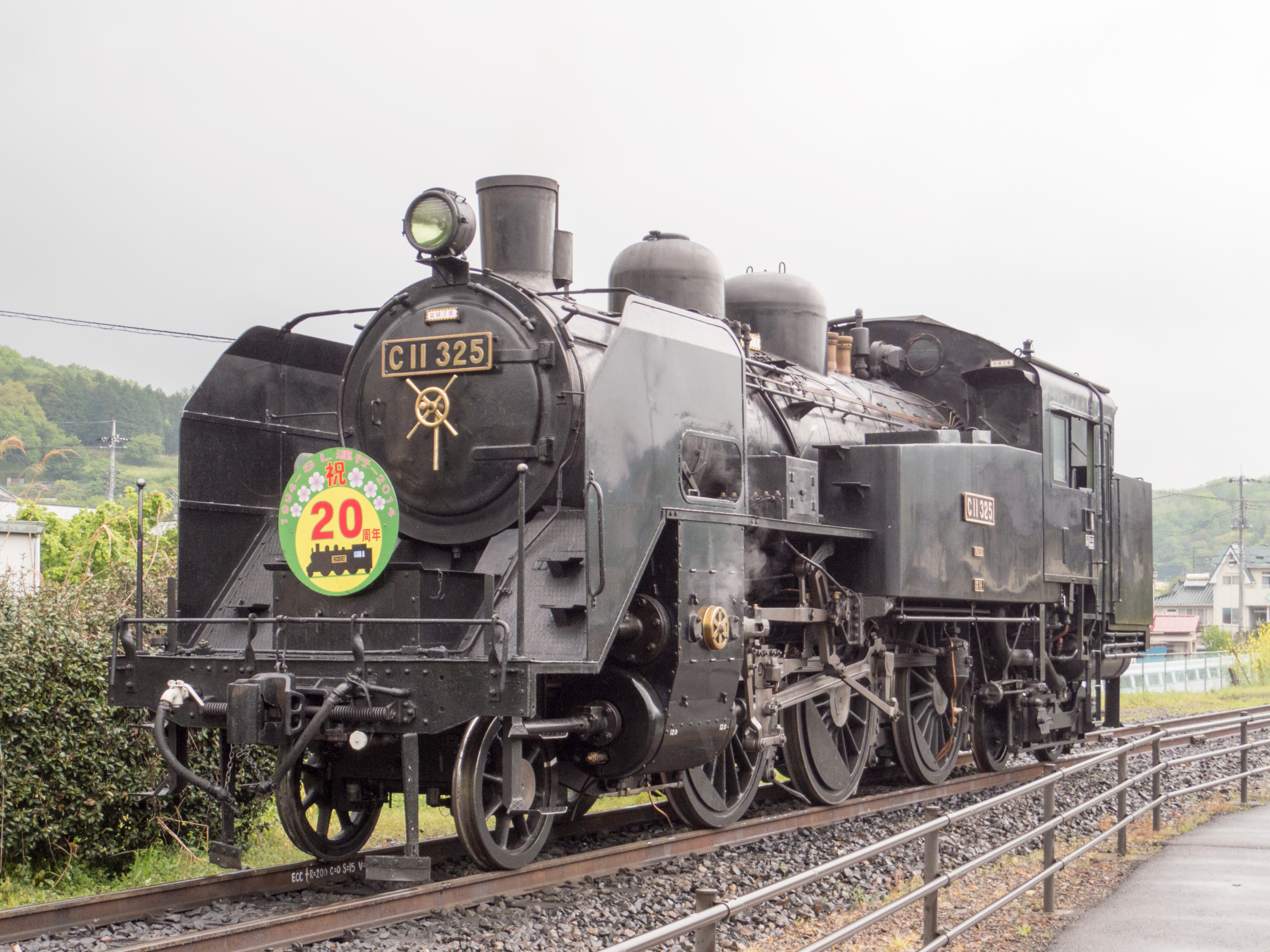
C11 325 in May 2014

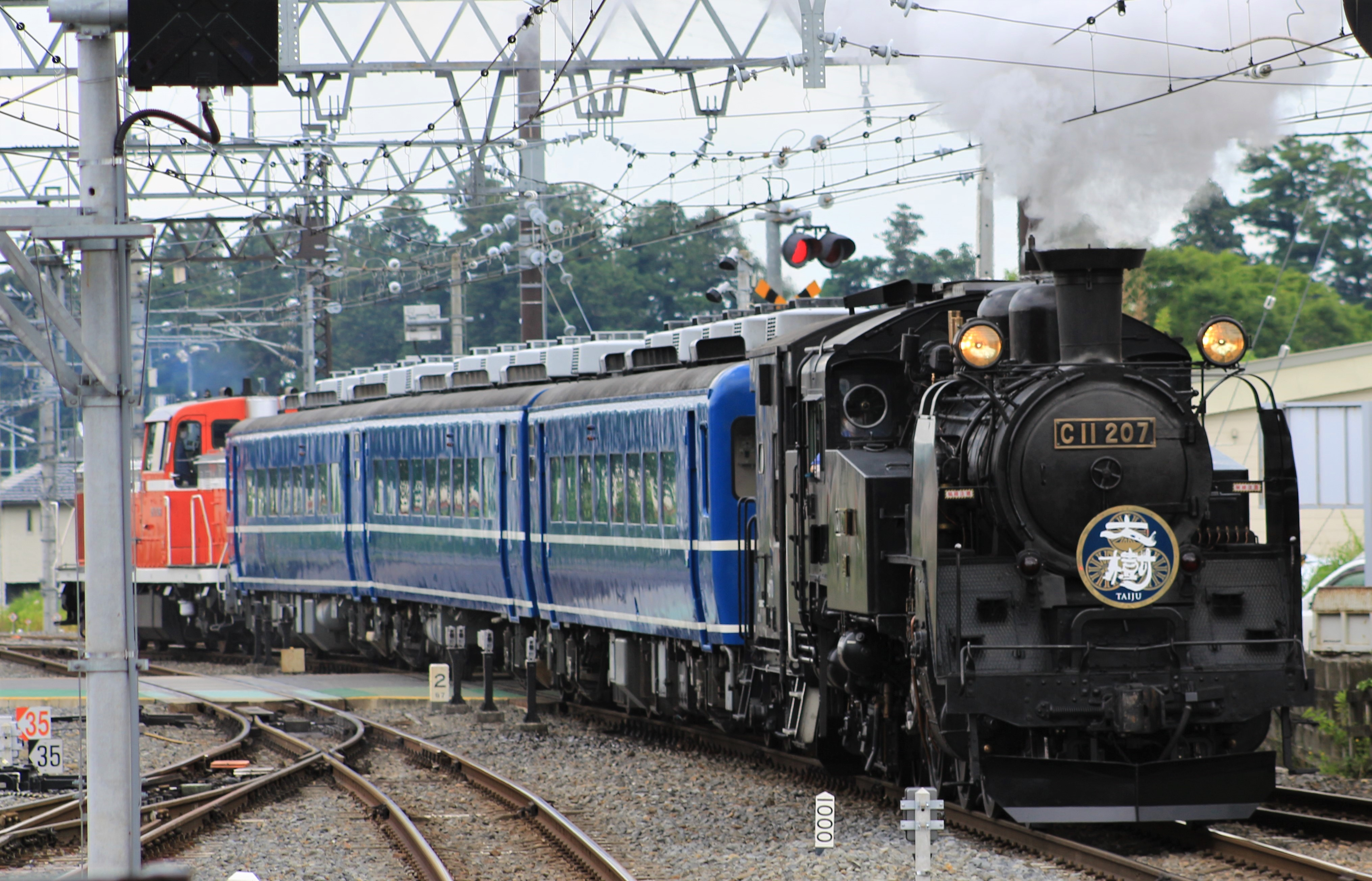
C11 207 in June 2020

=== Static ===
- C11 1: Ome Railway Park in Ome, Tokyo
- C11 40
- C11 46
- C11 61
- C11 63
- C11 64: Umekoji Steam Locomotive Museum in Kyoto
- C11 66
- C11 75
- C11 80
- C11 96
- C11 131
- C11 133
- C11 155
- C11 167
- C11 180
- C11 189
- C11 191
- C11 195
- C11 200
- C11 209
- C11 210
- C11 217
- C11 218 static display outdoors in poor state at Haya Sohonten Yakiniku in Mikunigaoka, Sakai City as of June 2020 (see Google Maps streetview). Still extant as of July 2024.
- C11 224
- C11 244
- C11 245
- C11 254
- C11 257
- C11 259
- C11 260
- C11 265
- C11 270
- C11 275
- C11 292: In front of Shimbashi Station in Minato, Tokyo. It blows its whistle every noon, 3 pm & 5 pm.
- C11 296
- C11 304
- C11 311
- C11 312: Oigawa Railway in Shizuoka Prefecture (used for spare parts). It made its final run on September 8, 2007.
- C11 322
- C11 324: Umekoji Steam Locomotive Museum in Kyoto (cab section only)
- C11 331
- C11 351: Sendai General Shinkansen Depot in Rifu, Miyagi
- C11 367
- C11 368
- C11 372
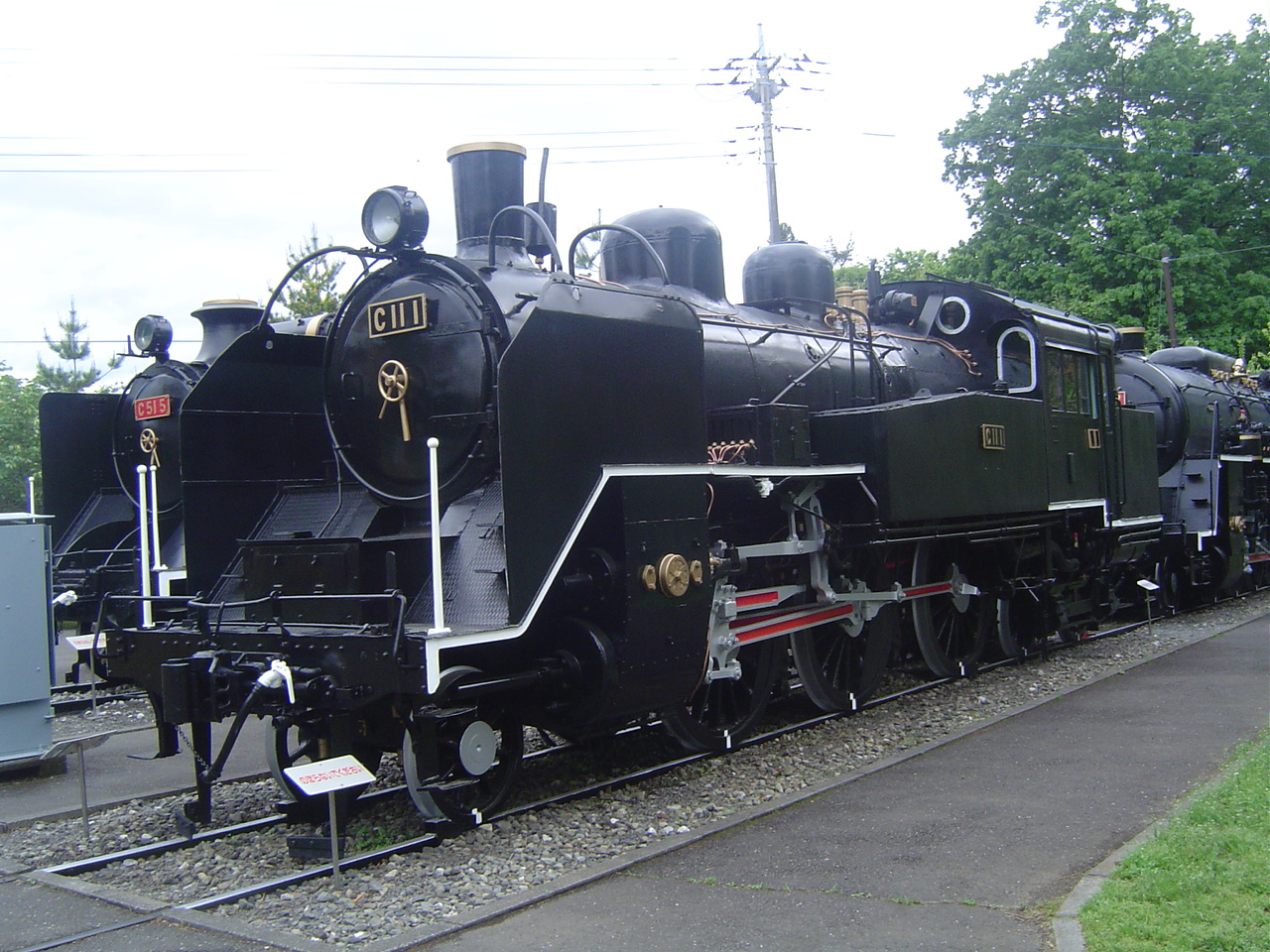
C11 1 at Ome Railway Park in May 2006

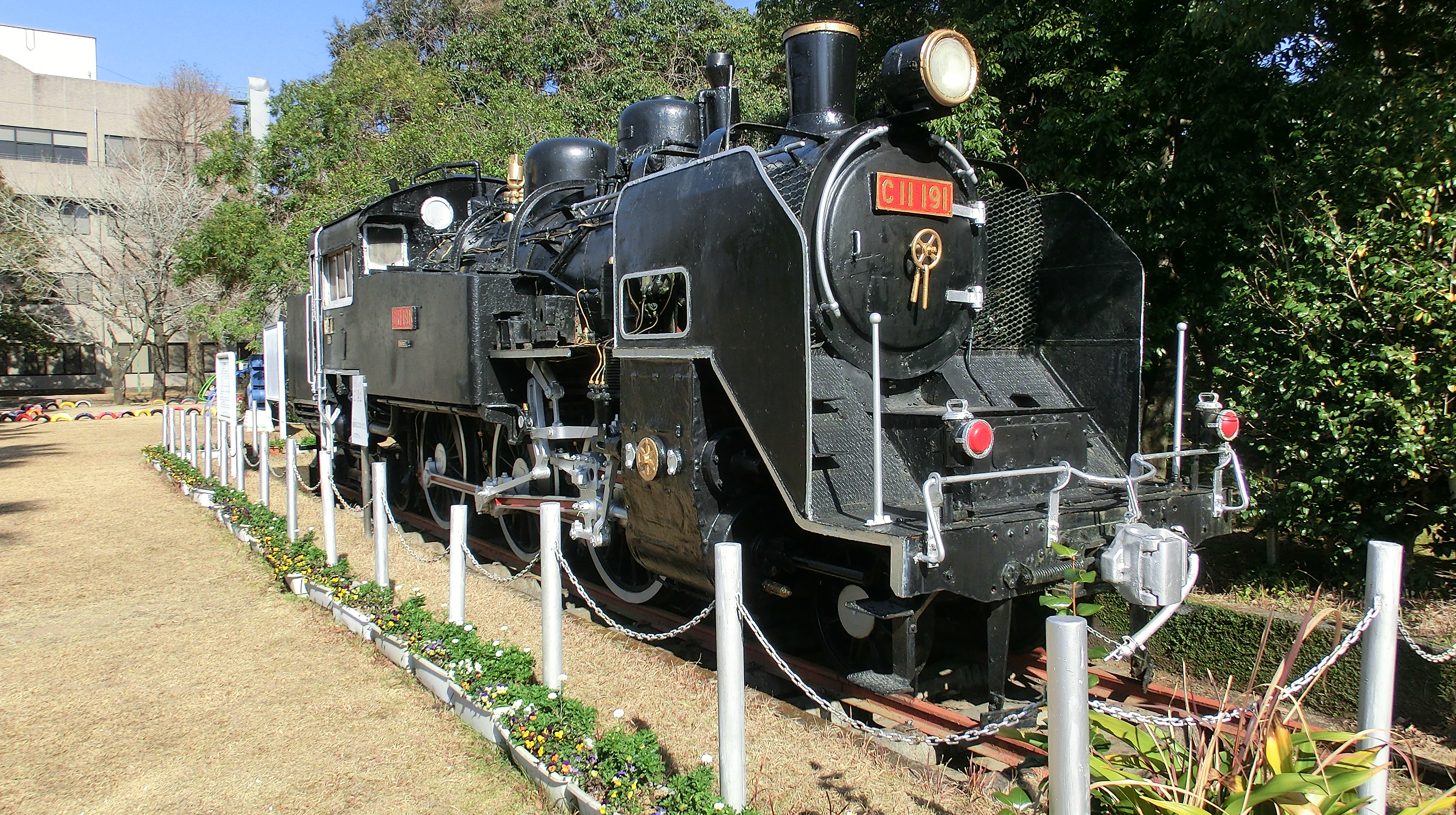
C11 191 in January 2015

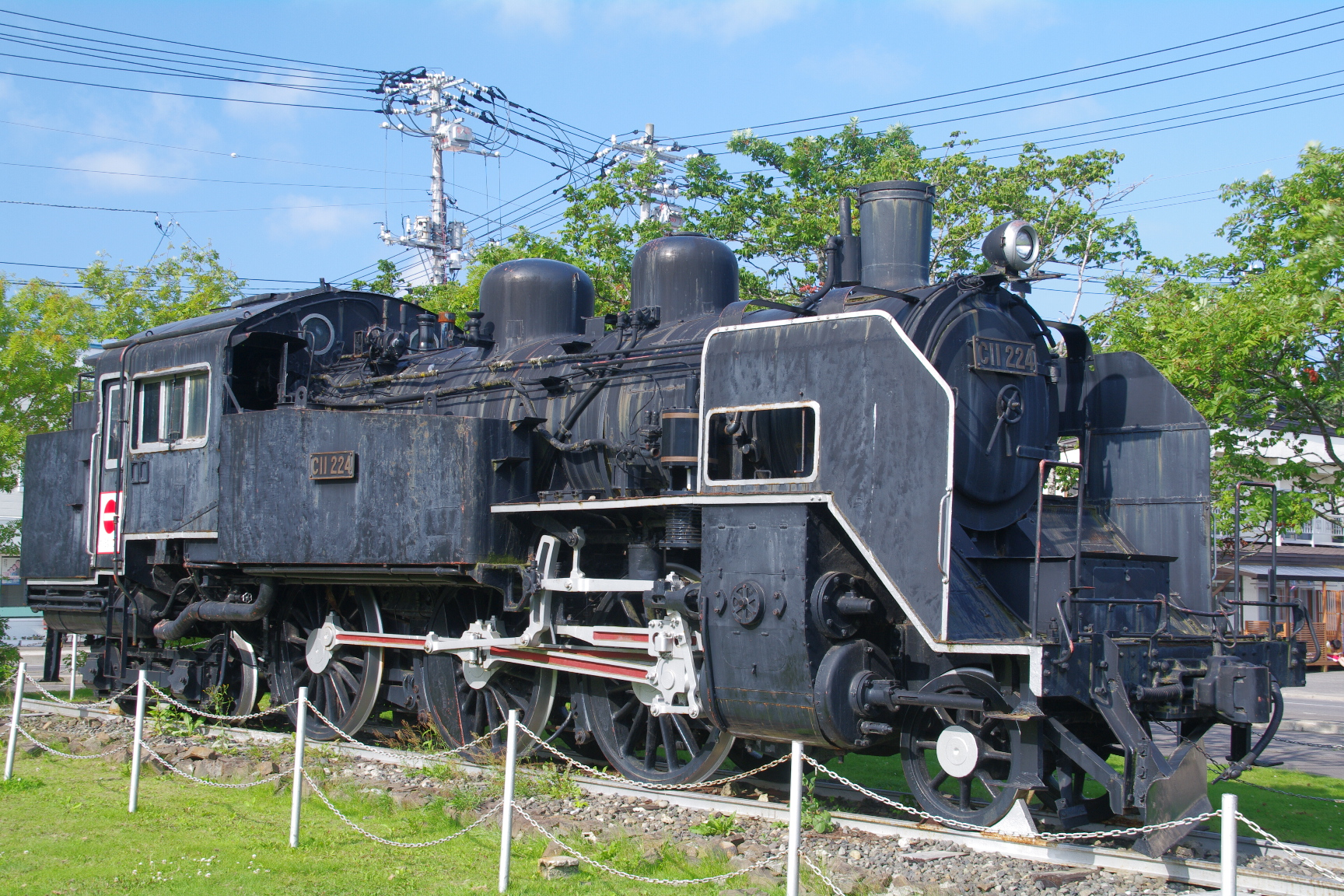
C11 224 in August 2009

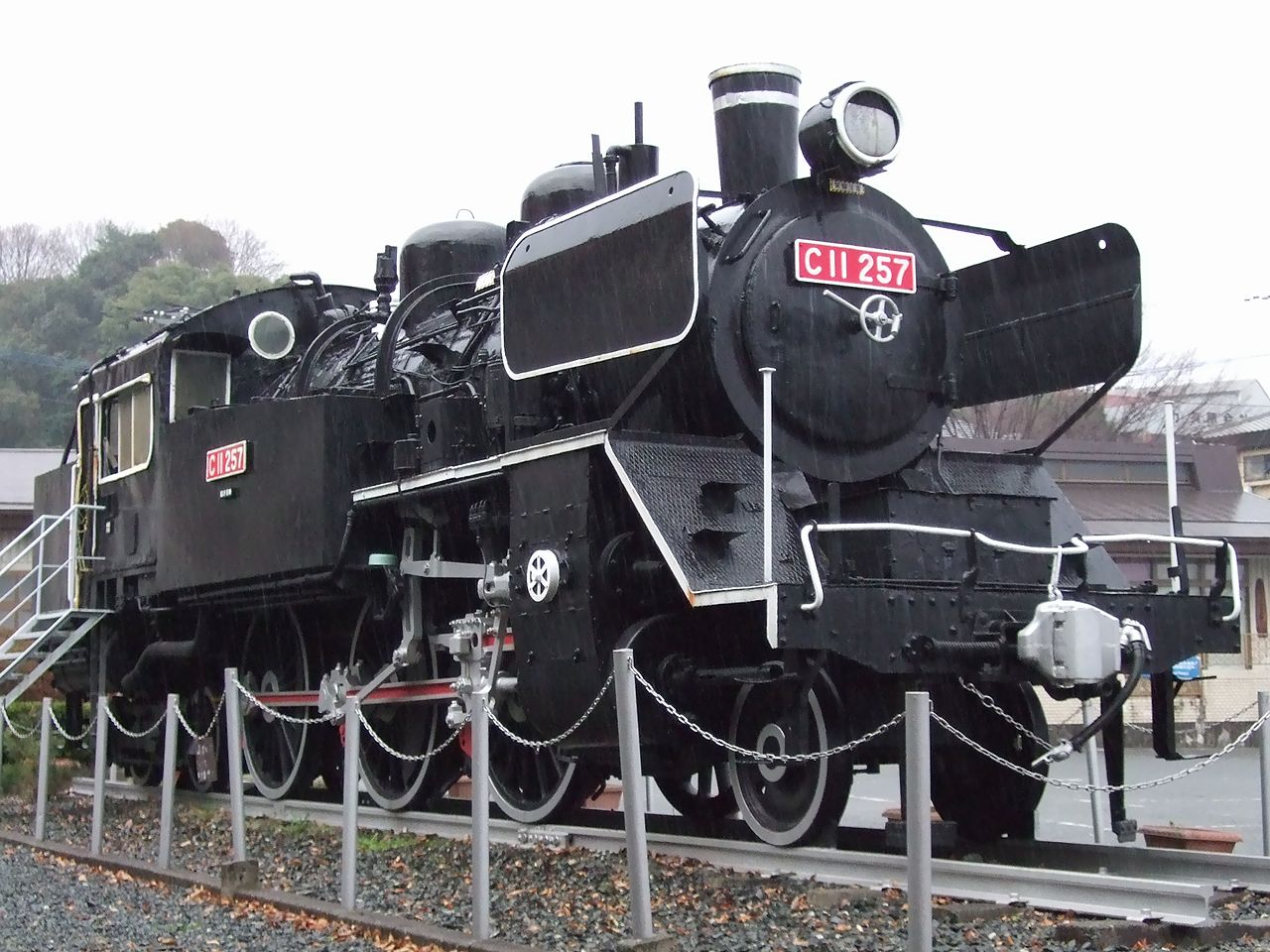
C11 257 in January 2009

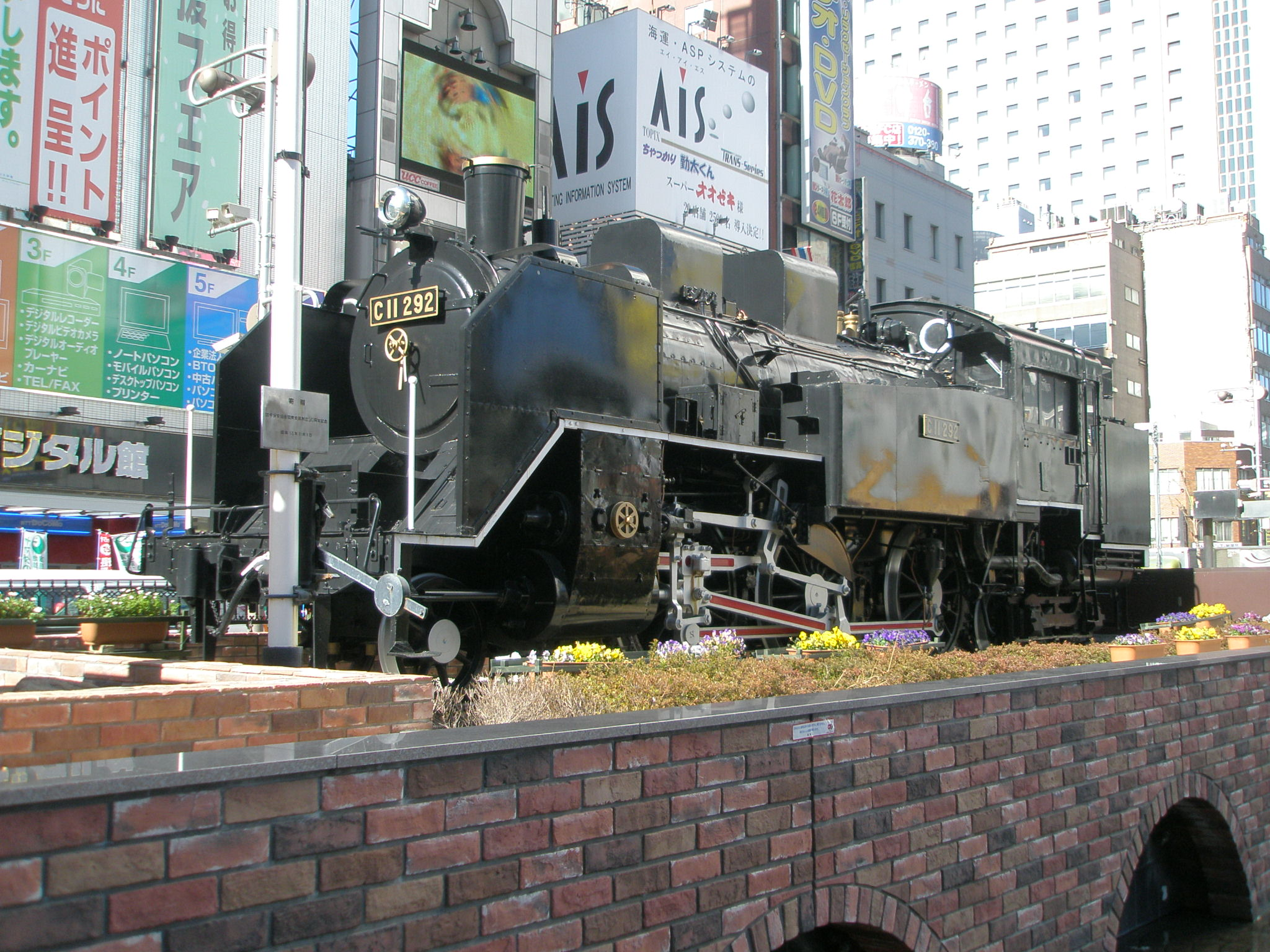
C11 292 in February 2008

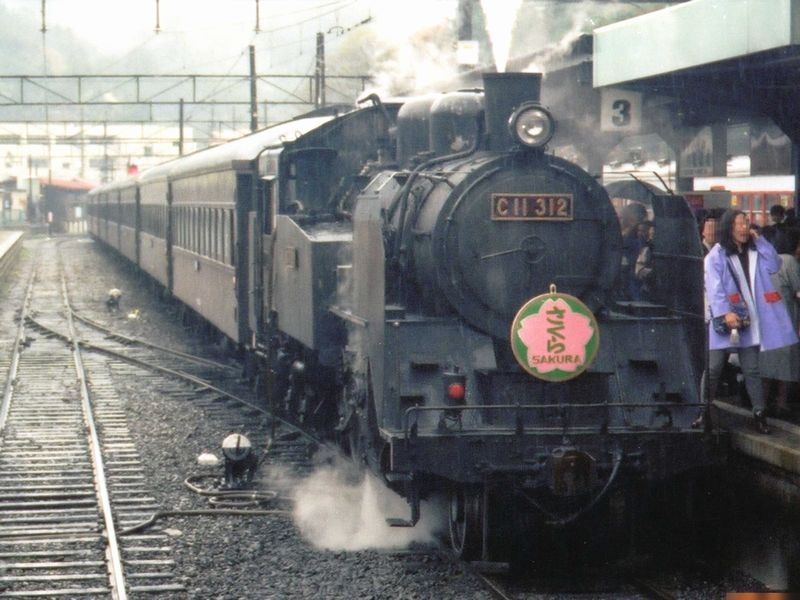
C11 312 while still in service, April 1997

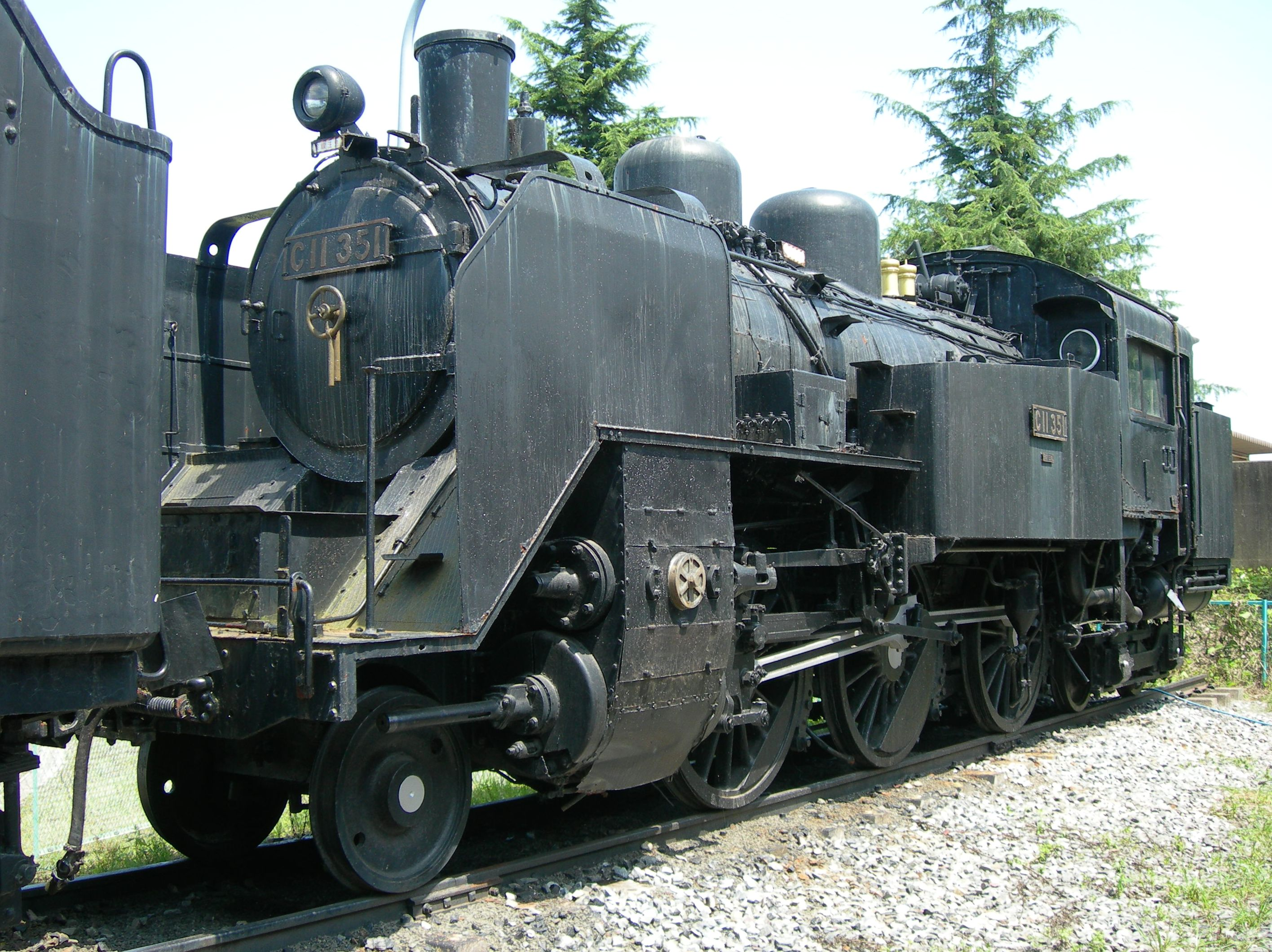
C11 351 in July 2009

== See also ==
- Japan Railways locomotive numbering and classification
- List of operational steam locomotives in Japan
