= GNRI Class T2 =

Class of two-cylinder 4-4-2T locomotives

GNR(I) class T2
Type and origin
- Power type: Steam
- Builder: Beyer, Peacock & Company (10); Nasmyth, Wilson & Company (10)
- Order number: BP: 01881 (1921), 147 (1929)
- Serial number: BP: 6035–6039, 6630–6634; NW 1423–1427, 1435–1439
- Build date: 1921, 1924 and 1929–30
- Total produced: 20
Specifications
- Configuration
  - Whyte: 4-4-2T
  - UIC: 2′B1′ h2t
- Gauge: 5 ft 3 in (1,600 mm)
- Driver dia.: 5 ft 9 in (1.753 m)
- Cylinders: Two, inside
- Cylinder size: 18 in × 24 in (457 mm × 610 mm)
Career
- Operators: GNR(I) → UTA and CIÉ

The Great Northern Railway (Ireland) T2 class was a class of 4-4-2T tank locomotives. The GNR(I) had introduced the T class numbered 185–189 in 1913. They were designed for both suburban services and longer runs such as Dublin to Drogheda and Belfast to Armagh. They proved so successful that a further twenty were commissioned in 1921, 1924 and 1929. Although externally identical in appearance to the T, they were classified as the T2 class having larger tanks and higher boiler pressure, and were used successfully on both fast passenger work and freight.

Roster
Manufacturer	Serial No.	Date	GNR(I) No.	1958 owner	1958 No.	Withdrawn	Notes
Beyer, Peacock & Company	6035	1921	1	CIÉ	—	1959	Fitted for oil-firing 1946–47
Beyer, Peacock & Company	6036	1921	2	UTA	2X	1960	Fitted for oil-firing 1946–47
Beyer, Peacock & Company	6037	1921	3	CIÉ	3N	1963	
Beyer, Peacock & Company	6038	1921	4	UTA	4X	1960	
Beyer, Peacock & Company	6039	1921	5	UTA	5X	1964	
Nasmyth, Wilson & Company	1423	1924	21	UTA	—	1958	
Nasmyth, Wilson & Company	1424	1924	30	UTA	30X	1961	
Nasmyth, Wilson & Company	1425	1924	115	CIÉ	—	1959	Fitted for oil-firing 1946–47
Nasmyth, Wilson & Company	1426	1924	116	CIÉ	116N	1961	Fitted for oil-firing 1946–47
Nasmyth, Wilson & Company	1427	1924	139	CIÉ	—	1959	
Nasmyth, Wilson & Company	1435	1924	142	UTA	142X	1960	
Nasmyth, Wilson & Company	1436	1924	143	CIÉ	143N	1963	
Nasmyth, Wilson & Company	1437	1924	144	CIÉ	—	1959	
Nasmyth, Wilson & Company	1438	1924	147	CIÉ	67N	1960	Renumbered 67 in 1948
Nasmyth, Wilson & Company	1439	1924	148	UTA	—	1958	Renumbered 69 in 1948
Beyer, Peacock & Company	6630	1929	62	CIÉ	62N	1960	
Beyer, Peacock & Company	6631	1929	63	CIÉ	—	1959	
Beyer, Peacock & Company	6632	1929	64	UTA	64X	1960	
Beyer, Peacock & Company	6633	1930	65	CIÉ	65N	1960	
Beyer, Peacock & Company	6634	1930	66	UTA	66X	1960	

== Model ==
The T2 is currently available as a 00 gauge etched-brass kit from Studio Scale Models. It includes transfers, brass etches, most nameplates and cast white metal parts.
