= 130T steam locomotive (Ferrocarriles Vascongados) =

Steam locomotive formerly operated by Ferrocarriles Vascongados

130T
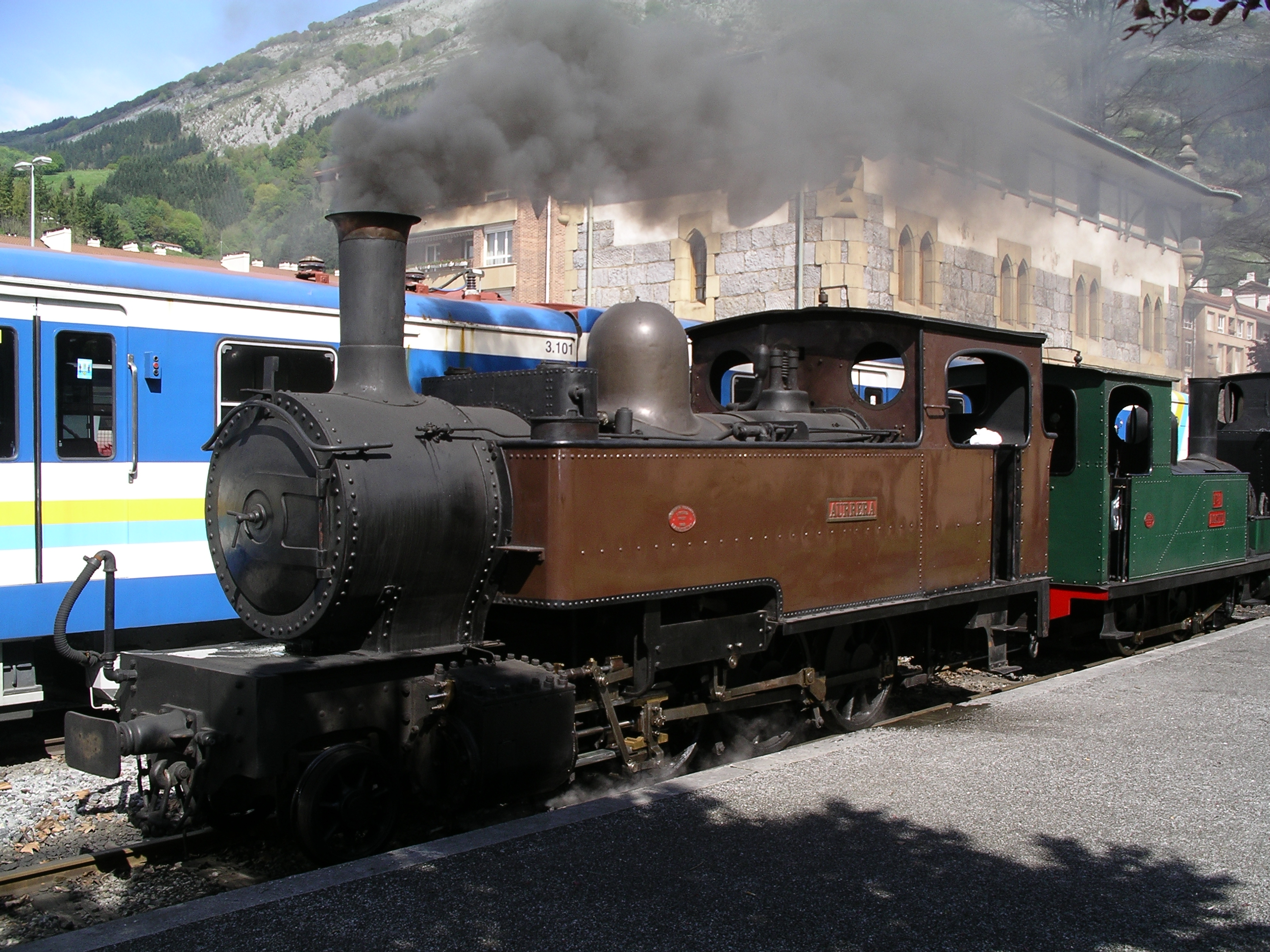
- The Aurrera locomotive, preserved at the Basque Railway Museum
Type and origin
- Power type: Steam
- Builder: Nasmyth & Wilson
- Build date: 1892-1898
- Total produced: 10
Specifications
- Configuration
  - Whyte: 2-6-0T
- Gauge: 1,000 mm (3 ft 3 3/8 in)
- Length: 8.25 m (27 ft 1 in)
- Width: 2.3 m (7 ft 7 in)
- Height: 3.5 m (11 ft 6 in)
- Loco weight: 35 t (77,162 lb)
Performance figures
- Power output: 250 hp (190 kW)
Career
- Operators: Ferrocarriles Vascongados
- Delivered: 1892
- Retired: 1964
- Disposition: One preserved, remainder scrapped

The 130T was a steam locomotive type originally operated by Ferrocarriles Vascongados in the Basque Country, Spain. One of the locomotives, named Aurrera, has been preserved at the Basque Railway Museum and is used regularly to haul heritage trains.

== History ==
The early light locomotives bought by the railway companies that would merge to form Ferrocarriles Vascongados were underpowered. The Elgoibar-San Sebastián Railway received six heavier locomotives from Nasmyth & Wilson in 1892, five of which were immediately transferred to the Biscay Central Railway, which needed a substitute for its light Hanomag locomotives. Two more locomotives of the same type were acquired by Biscay Central in 1894, and another one by each of the two companies in 1898.

On 2 April 1904, the four locomotives operated by the Elgoibar-San Sebastián Railway were transferred to the Durango-Zumárraga Railway, and renamed according to the scheme used by Biscay Central. All the locomotives were incorporated into the Ferrocarriles Vascongados fleet in 1906. However, after the introduction of the Euzkadi class locomotives in 1914, the 130T-s were gradually retired and sold to other operators. They were in service with Ferrocarriles Vascongados and other companies until 1964.

== List of locomotives ==
The individual details of the locomotives are as follows.

Original operator No.	FV No.	Name	N&B No.	Build date	Fate
Central 8	105	Igartua	435	1892	Relegated to shunting services after the electrification in 1929. Stored since the 1950s in Durango, it was scrapped in 1974.
Central 9		Ibaizábal	436	1892	Acquired by José de Uribasterra on 20 March 1915. Sold to the Vasco-Navarro railway in 1920 and to the Madrid-Almorox railway in 1942. Scrapped in 1964.
Central 10		Bilbao	439	1892	Acquired by José de Uribasterra on 20 March 1915, fate unknown.
Central 11	302	Tavira	438	1892	Sold to a mine railway in San Cebrián de Mudá, Palencia on 23 September 1935. It was later sold to a cement producer in Mataporquera. Scrapped in the early 1970s.
Central 12		Durango	437	1892	Relegated to shunting services after the electrification in 1929. Scrapped in Durango in 1963.
E.S.S. 1	102	Zarauz	440	1892	It was sold to the Bidasoa railway on 4 September 1915, where it remained in service until 1956. It was scrapped shortly thereafter.
E.S.S. 2	101	Deva	455	1894	During the Spanish Civil War it was leased and then sold to the Bilbao-Lezama railway, which was later merged into Ferrocarriles y Transportes Suburbanos. After the electrification of that line in 1951, it was used by EFE on the Castro-Traslaviña railway. It was scrapped in 1964.
E.S.S. 3	103	San Sebastián	456	1894	During the Spanish Civil War it was leased and then sold to the Bilbao-Lezama railway, which was later merged into Ferrocarriles y Transportes Suburbanos. It was scrapped in 1960.
Central 13		Vizcaya	550	1898	It was used in the early 1920s in the construction of the Calahorra-Arnedillo railway, and later acquired in the 1930s by Explotación de Ferrocarriles por el Estado for use on the Amorebieta-Pedernales railway. During the Spanish Civil War it was leased and then sold to the Bilbao-Lezama railway, which was later merged into Ferrocarriles y Transportes Suburbanos. After the electrification of that line in 1951, it was again used by EFE on the Amorebieta-Pedernales railway and on the Castro-Traslaviña railway. It was scrapped in the early 1960s.
E.S.S. 14	104	Aurrera	551	1898	Relegated to shunting services after the electrification in 1929. Its boiler was used in the 1960s for the production of distilled water for the batteries of the electric locomotives of the company. It was preserved, and from 1986 to 1990 it was placed outdoors in Oñati. It was then restored, and on 20 March 1992 it moved again on its own power. Since then, it has been used to haul heritage trains in the Basque Railway Museum.

== See also ==
- Ferrocarriles Vascongados § Rolling stock
