= GNRI Class T =

Class of Irish 4-4-2T locomotives

GNR(I) class T
Type and origin
- Power type: Steam
- Builder: Beyer, Peacock & Company
- Order number: BP: 0646
- Serial number: 5737–5741
- Build date: 1913
- Total produced: 5
Specifications
- Configuration
  - Whyte: 4-4-2T
  - UIC: 2′B1 n2t, later 2′B1 h2t
- Gauge: 5 ft 3 in (1,600 mm)
- Driver dia.: 5 ft 9 in (1.753 m)
- Fuel type: Coal
- Cylinders: Two
- Cylinder size: 18 in × 24 in (457 mm × 610 mm)
Career
- Operators: Great Northern Railway (Ireland); Ulster Transport Authority; Coras Iompair Eireann
- Numbers: GNRI: 185–189; UTA: 185x–187x, 189x; CIÉ: (none)
- Withdrawn: CIÉ: 1959; UTA: 1960:1964
- Disposition: All scrapped

The Great Northern Railway (Ireland) T class were 4-4-2T Atlantic locomotives built by Beyer, Peacock & Company in 1913. Five of this type were built. They were later rebuilt with superheaters as class T1.

As the T1 class, they featured 18 x 24 inch or 18½ x 24 inch cylinders with 5 foot 9 inch wheels, built to 5 feet 3 inches gauge.

Later, an improved version known as the T2 class was built, featuring higher boiler pressure and larger tanks.

The five locomotives were numbered 185–189 and were intended for passenger work. No. 187 was rebuilt as a T1 in 1926 and remained in service into the Ulster Transport Authority era, being withdrawn in 1964.
