= JNR Class E10 =

Class of 5 Japanese 2–10–4T locomotives

Class E10
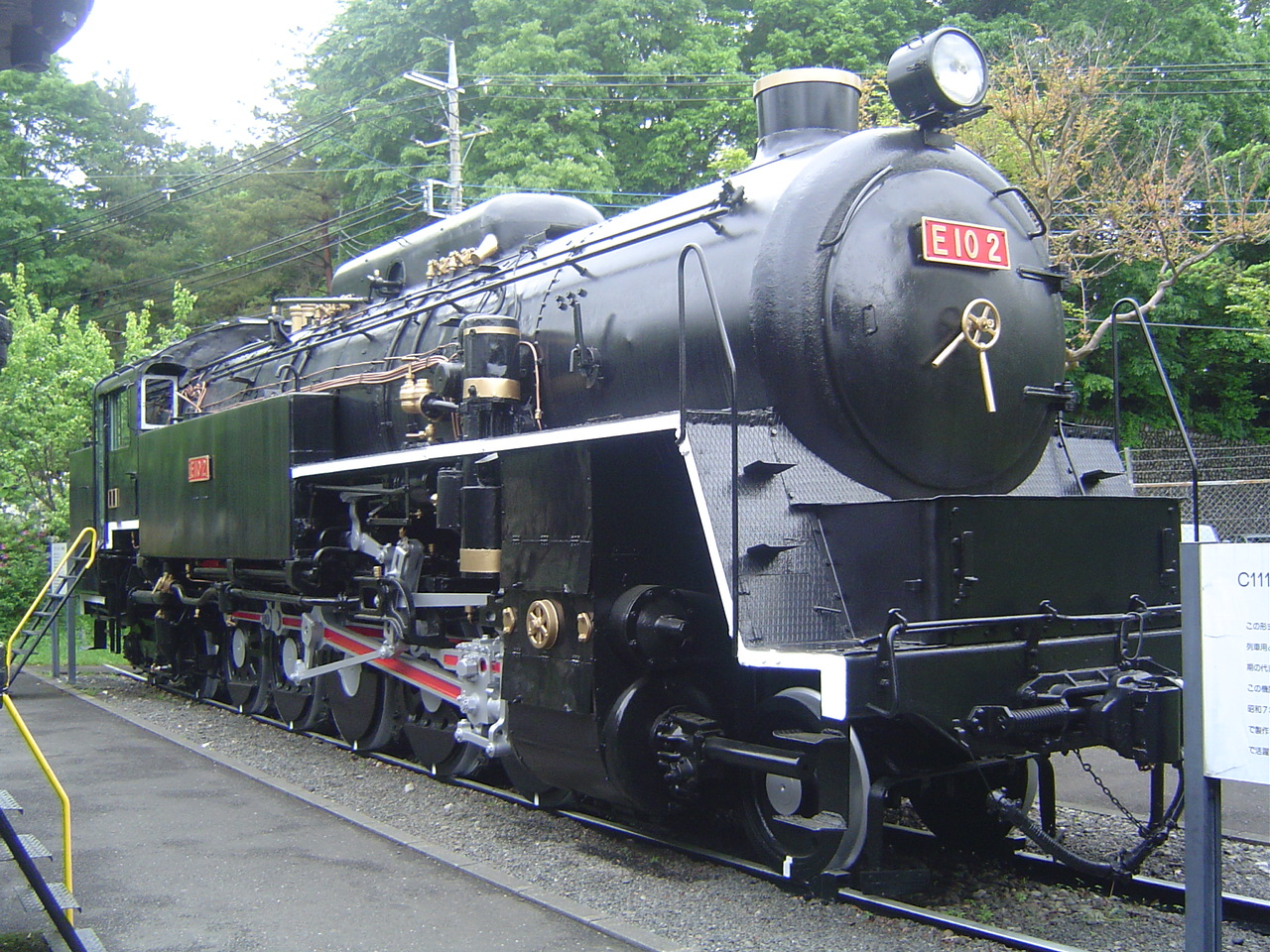
- Preserved E10 2 at Ōme Railway Park, May 2006
Type and origin
- Power type: Steam
- Designer: Atsuo Kinugasa, Eiichi Watabayashi
- Builder: Kisha Seizō
- Serial number: 2445 - 2449
- Build date: 1948
- Total produced: 5
Specifications
- Configuration
  - Whyte: 2-10-4T
  - UIC: 1'E2'2t
- Gauge: 1,067 mm (3 ft 6 in)
- Leading dia.: 860 mm (2 ft 10 in)
- Driver dia.: 1,250 mm (4 ft 1 in)
- Trailing dia.: 860 mm (2 ft 10 in)
- Length: 14,450 mm (47 ft 5 in)
- Height: 3,982 mm (13 ft 0.8 in)
- Axle load: 14.24 t (14.02 long tons; 15.70 short tons)
- Adhesive weight: 70.47 t (69.36 long tons; 77.68 short tons)
- Loco weight: 102.1 t (100.5 long tons; 112.5 short tons)
- Boiler pressure: 16.0 kg/cm^{2} (228 psi)
- Cylinders: 2
- Cylinder size: 550 mm × 660 mm (22 in × 26 in) (bore × stroke)
Performance figures
- Tractive effort: 213.0 kN (47,900 lb_{f})
Career
- Preserved: 1
- Scrapped: 1962
- Disposition: One preserved, four scrapped

The Class E10 (E10形) was a class of 2-10-4T steam locomotives built for the Japanese Government Railways (JGR) in 1948 and designed by Hideo Shima. They were numbered E10 1-E10 5.

Following the end of World War II the JGR was prohibited by GHQ from building new locomotives due to financial difficulties. However, an exception was granted for the E10s to replace the ageing JNR Class 4110 locomotives because it was not possible to substitute existing locomotives on the steep gradients of the Ōu Main Line where they were used.

The E10 boiler was a unique design based on the JNR Class D52 with the fire grate area reduced by 0.55 m^{2} (5.9 ft^{2}).

Five locomotives were built by Kisha Seizo in 1948. They were the last steam locomotives built for Japanese National Railways. The last examples were withdrawn in 1962.

== Preserved examples ==
One E10, E10 2, was preserved at Ome Railway Park in Ōme, Tokyo.

== See also ==
- Japan Railways locomotive numbering and classification
