= LT&SR 69 Class =

Class of British steam locomotives

LT&SR 69 class
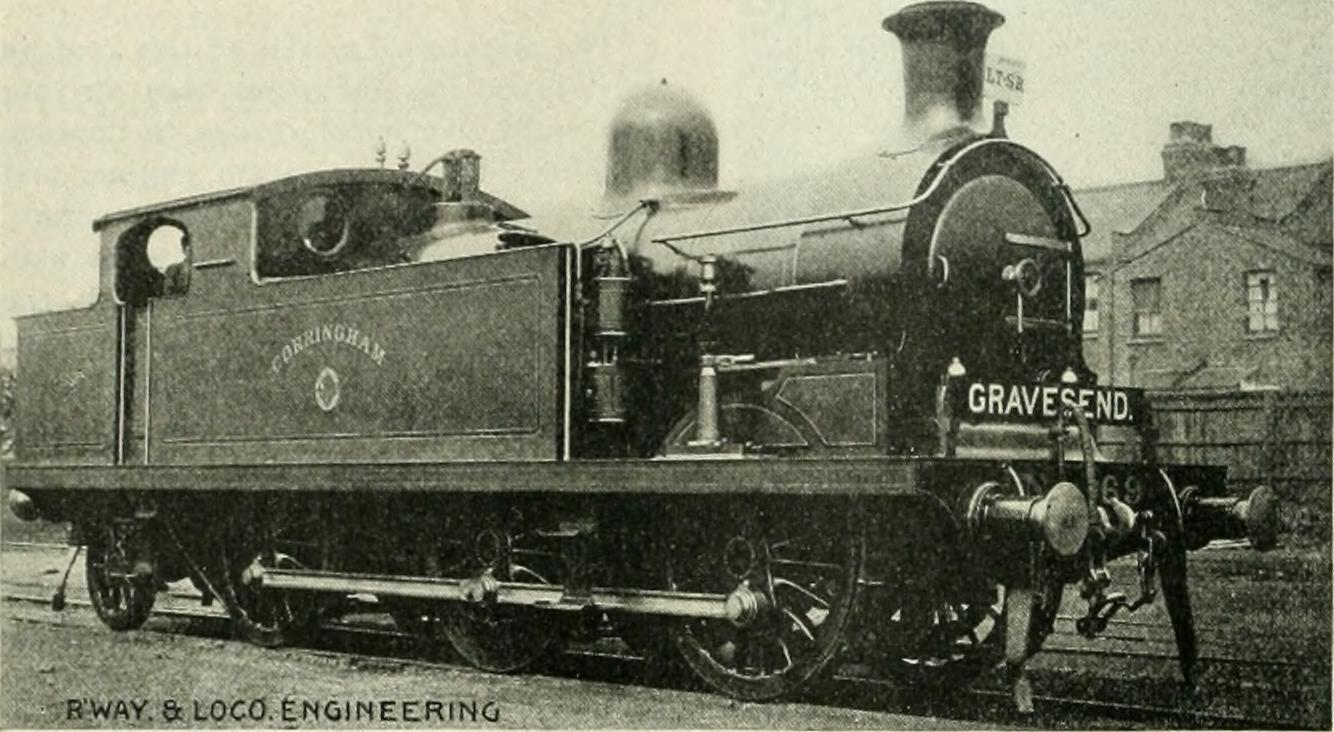
- LT&SR 69 Corringham in 1903.
Type and origin
- Power type: Steam
- Designer: Thomas Whitelegg
- Builder: North British Locomotive Co. (10), Beyer, Peacock & Co. (4)
- Serial number: BP 5604–5607
- Build date: 1903 (6), 1908 (4), 1912 (4)
- Total produced: 14
Specifications
- Configuration
  - Whyte: 0-6-2T
  - UIC: C1 t
- Gauge: 4 ft 8 1/2 in (1,435 mm)
- Driver dia.: 5 ft 3 in (1.600 m)
- Loco weight: 64.65 long tons (65.69 t)
- Boiler pressure: 170 psi (1.17 MPa)
- Cylinders: Two
- Cylinder size: 18 in × 26 in (457 mm × 660 mm)
- Valve gear: Stephenson
Performance figures
- Tractive effort: 19,320 lbf (85.9 kN)
Career
- Operators: London, Tilbury and Southend Railway; →Midland Railway; →London, Midland and Scottish Railway; →British Railways
- Class: LTSR: 69
- Power class: MR/LMS/BR: 2F
- Number in class: 1 January 1923: 14, 1 January 1948: 14
- Withdrawn: 1958 (3), 1959 (10), 1962 (1).
- Disposition: All scrapped.

The LT&SR 69 class was a class of 0-6-2T steam locomotives designed for freight work on the London, Tilbury and Southend Railway. Six were initially built in 1903 to the design of Thomas Whitelegg, four more followed in 1908, and a further four in 1912, after the LT&SR's takeover by the Midland Railway (MR) in that year, giving a total of 14. The Midland renumbered them 2180–2193, and all entered LMS stock upon the grouping of 1923. The LMS renumbered them 2220–2233 in 1923, but then took them back to 2180–2193 in 1939. In 1947 they were again renumbered 1980–1993 by the LMS, and in 1948 all were acquired by British Railways. BR added 40000 to their numbers so they became 41980–41993. Withdrawals started in 1958, and by 1959 all but 41981 had gone. It was withdrawn and scrapped in 1962.

== List of locomotives ==
LTSR No.	LTSR Name	Builder	Order No	Serial No	Built	MR No.	LMS 1923 No.	LMS 1939 No.	LMS 1947 No.	BR No.	Withdrawn
69	Corringham	D / NBL(QP)	4468E	4468 / 15750	06/1903	2180	2220	2180	1980	41980	1958
70	Basildon	D / NBL(QP)	4468E	4469 / 15751	06/1903	2181	2221	2181	1981	41981	1962
71	Wakering	D / NBL(QP)	4468E	4470 / 15752	06/1903	2182	2222	2182	1982	41982	1959
72	Hadleigh	D / NBL(QP)	4468E	4471 / 15753	06/1903	2183	2223	2183	1983	41983	1959
73	Cranham	D / NBL(QP)	4468E	4472 / 15754	07/1903	2184	2224	2184	1984	41984	1959
74	Orsett	D / NBL(QP)	4468E	4473 / 15755	07/1903	2185	2225	2185	1985	41985	1959
75	Canvey Island	NBL(QP)	L298	18504	1908	2186	2226	2186	1986	41986	1959
76	Dunton	NBL(QP)	L298	18505	1908	2187	2227	2187	1987	41987	1959
77	Fobbing	NBL(QP)	L298	18506	1908	2188	2228	2188	1988	41988	1958
78	Dagenham Dock	NBL(QP)	L298	18507	1908	2189	2229	2189	1989	41989	1958
—	—	BP		5604	1912	2190	2330	2190	1990	41990	1959
—	—	BP		5605	1912	2191	2331	2191	1991	41991	1959
—	—	BP		5606	1912	2192	2332	2192	1992	41992	1959
—	—	BP		5607	1912	2193	2333	2193	1993	41993	1959
