= Nasmyth, Gaskell and Company =

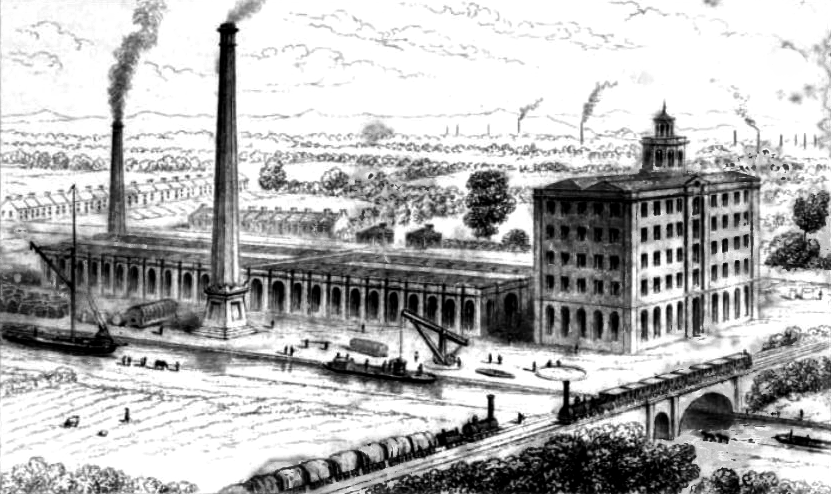
- The Liverpool and Manchester Railway, and Bridgewater Canal pass the Bridgewater Foundry, pictured in 1839
- Company type: General partnership
- Industry: Engineering; Heavy industry
- Predecessor: The Bridgewater Foundry
- Founded: 1836
- Founder: James Nasmyth; Holbrook Gaskell
- Defunct: 1940
- Successor: James Nasmyth and Co. Patricroft Ironworks; Nasmyth, Wilson and Co.
- Headquarters: Patricroft, Salford, United Kingdom
- Products: Heavy machine tools Locomotives

Nasmyth, Gaskell and Company, originally called The Bridgewater Foundry, specialised in the production of heavy machine tools and locomotives. It was located in Patricroft, in Salford England, close to the Liverpool and Manchester Railway, the Bridgewater Canal and the Manchester Ship Canal. The company was founded in 1836 and dissolved in 1940.

== Nasmyth ==
The company was founded in 1836 by James Nasmyth and Holbrook Gaskell. Nasmyth had previously been employed in Henry Maudslay's workshop in Lambeth and his interest was mainly, but not limited to, specialist machine tools.

== Modern materials handling ==
The Bridgewater Foundry is an example of modern materials handling that was part of the evolution of the assembly line.

The buildings were arranged in a line with a railway for carrying the work going through the buildings. Cranes were used for lifting the heavy work, which sometimes weighed in the tens of tons. The work passed sequentially through to the erection of the framework and final assembly.

== Locomotives ==
The company produced nine locomotives in 1839, thirteen in 1840, eight in 1841 and sixteen in 1842. These were sub-contracted from other makers such as Edward Bury, and produced to their designs. Those for the Midland Counties and London and Southampton Railways were 2-2-0 with 5-foot-6-inch (1.676 m) driving wheels and 12-by-18-inch (305 mm × 457 mm) cylinders, similar to those railway's Bury machines. (One Midland Counties locomotive was 2-2-2, and had smaller drivers, with 5 ft 0 in (1.524 m) and 14-by-18-inch (356 mm × 457 mm) cylinders.) In 1841 the Birmingham and Gloucester Railway had found some American Norris 4-2-0 locomotives very successful, especially on the notorious Lickey Incline, and the company built six similar ones for the line.

== Expansion ==
In 1850 the name of the firm was changed to James Nasmyth and Company, then in 1857 to Patricroft Ironworks. In 1867 Robert Wilson and Henry Garnett became the principal partners and the company's name changed again to Nasmyth, Wilson and Company.

From about 1873 the demand for locomotives from overseas increased. By 1938 over 1,650 locomotives had been produced, over one thousand of which were exported.

In 1883, Nasmyth Wilson and Co. produced the very first design of Prairie or 2-6-2 locomotives in the world, for the New Zealand Railways Department. These locomotives entered traffic between 1885 and 1890 after a somewhat rough start. several were dumped in rivers as flood protection in the 1920s, and have since been exhumed for preservation.

== Decline and closure ==
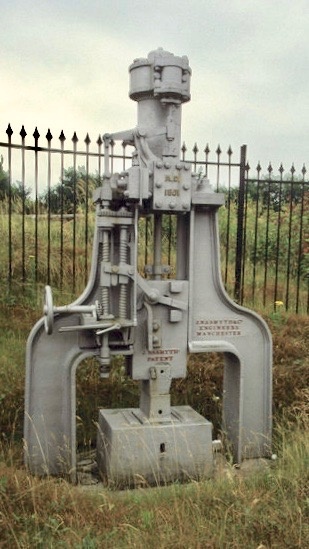
A Nasmyth steam hammer at the site of the former foundry

During World War I the factory was mainly engaged in munitions work, but it built twenty 2-8-0 locomotives for the French Chemin de fer de l'État (140-251 to 140-270) and 32 for India, along with a hundred small petrol driven locomotives.

Sales continued after the end of the war but by the early 1930s orders had begun to dwindle. In 1934 the works supplied four standard gauge N class 0-6-0T shunters to Palestine Railways. These were evidently satisfactory as Palestine Railways bought four more in 1935, two in 1936 and a final pair in 1938.

The last locomotive order was for two 2-6-4T metre gauge tank locomotives, Works No. 1649 and 1650, dispatched in 1938 to the South Indian Railways. Only two other locomotives were produced in 1938; these were the last pair of N class 0-6-0Ts for Palestine Railways, Works No. 1651 and 1652.

As part of a planned reorganisation of the industry, the company ceased manufacture of locomotives and handed over all its drawings and patterns to the British Locomotive Manufacturers Association. The company continued to make steam hammers and machine tools.

On 1 June 1940 the Ministry of Supply took over the factory and it became an engineering Royal Ordnance Factory, ROF Patricroft. The company, however, was formally wound up on 7 November 1940, having reported a loss of £2,663 for 1939.

In 1987, the Royal Ordnance Factories were bought by British Aerospace and in 1989 the Patricroft engineering works was closed down. The site, including some of the original buildings, is now used as a business and technology centre.

By 2009, a large section (the central building) had been demolished.

== Locomotive production list ==
Serial numbers	Year	Quantity	Customer	Class	Wheel arrangement	Road numbers	Notes
25–32	1841	8	Great Western Railway	Firefly	2-2-2	various names	7 ft 1/4 in (2,140 mm) gauge.
35–42	1842	8	Great Western Railway	Firefly	2-2-2	various names	7 ft 1/4 in (2,140 mm) gauge.
43–46	1842	4	Great Western Railway	Hurcules	0-6-0	various names	7 ft 1/4 in (2,140 mm) gauge.
120–124	1872	5	Great Eastern Railway	477	0-6-0	507–511	Renumbered 0507–0511 in 1899.
216–223	1882	8	Bengal Central Railway	H	4-4-0	1–8	5 ft 6 in (1,676 mm) gauge. Two to Nizam's Guaranteed State Railway, six to Eastern Bengal Railway
252–261	1884	10	New Zealand Government Railways	V	2-6-2	various	
262–263	1884	2	Provincia de Santa Fe Railway	1a	2-6-0/4	various	Road numbers 1-2
264–266	1884	3	Provincia de Santa Fe Railway	2a	4-4-0/4	various	Road numbers 3-5
272–281	1885	10	New Zealand Government Railways	P	2-8-0	various	
282–284	1885	3	Wellington and Manawatu Railway Company	V	2-6-2	6–8	later New Zealand Government Railways 450–452
287–290	1885	4	Provincia de Santa Fe Railway	1a'	4-6-0/4	various	Road numbers 6-9 - Different wheel arrangement than 1a Class
291–293	1886	3	Provincia de Santa Fe Railway	2a	4-4-0/4	various	Road numbers 10-12
294–295	1886	2	Provincia de Santa Fe Railway	2a'	2-6-0/4	various	Road numbers 13-14 - Larger diameter wheels than 2a Class
298	1886	1	Nippon Railway	W3/3	0-6-0T	22	later Japanese Government Railways Class 1100 1106
300-303	1887	4	Japanese Government Railways	J	2-4-2T	69-75 (odds)	later Japanese Government Railways Class 400 400-403
305-306	1887	2	Japanese Government Railways	I	0-6-0T	55, 57	later Japanese Government Railways Class 1100 1100-1101
307-308	1887	2	Nippon Railway	W3/3	0-6-0T	23-24	later Japanese Government Railways Class 1100 1107-1108
309	1887	1	Japanese Government Railways	I	0-6-0T	60	later Taiwan Government-General Railway E12
310	1887	1	Japanese Government Railways	I	0-6-0T	63	later Japanese Government Railways Class 1100 1102
326-331	1887	6	Nippon Railway	W2/4	2-4-2T	31-36	later Japanese Government Railways Class 600 602-607
334-335	1888	2	Japanese Government Railways	L	2-4-2T	121, 123	later Japanese Government Railways Class 600 665-666
336-337	1888	2	Japanese Government Railways	AB	2-6-2T	74, 76	later Japanese Government Railways Class 3080 3080-3081
338-339	1888	2	Hokkaidō Colliery Railway	ニ	0-6-0T	17-18	later Japanese Government Railways Class 1100 1112-1113
340	1887	1	Japanese Government Railways	I	0-6-0T	124	later Japanese Government Railways Class 1100 1104
342-343	1888	2	Nippon Railway	W2/4	2-4-2T	40-41	later Japanese Government Railways Class 600 608-609
346-347	1889	2	Japanese Government Railways	L	2-4-2T	86, 88	later Japanese Government Railways Class 600 663-664
354–365	1889	15	Queensland Railways	B15	4-6-0	206–219	
369-374	1889	6	Nippon Railway	Wt3/4	2-6-0	54-59	later Japanese Government Railways Class 7600 7600-7605
383-388	1889	6	Nippon Railway	W2/4	2-4-2T	42-47	later Japanese Government Railways Class 600 610-615
390-395	1890	6	Japanese Government Railways	L	2-4-2T	169-179 (odds)	later Japanese Government Railways Class 600 667-672
396-401	1890	6	Nippon Railway	W2/4	2-4-2T	48-53	later Japanese Government Railways Class 600 621. 616-620
425–430	1892	6	London, Tilbury and Southend Railway	1	4-4-2T	31–36	to Midland Railway 2140–2146 in 1912
435–440	1892	6	Elgoibar-San Sebastián	130T	2-6-0T	various	To Ferrocarriles Vascongados in 1906.
455–456	1894	2	Elgoibar-San Sebastián	130T	2-6-0T	various	To Ferrocarriles Vascongados in 1906.
460–462	1895	3	Cambrian Railways		0-4-4T	3, 5, 7	to Great Western Railway 10, 11, 15 in 1922
488-490	1896	3	Chūetsu Railway	1	0-6-0T	1-3	later Japanese Government Railways Class 1050 1050-1052
494-496		3	Nanao Railway	甲1	0-6-0T	1-3	later Japanese Government Railways Class 1200 1206-1208
498	1896	1	Sangū Railway	2	2-4-0T	5	later Japanese Government Railways Class 100 100
501-503	1897	3	Toyokawa Railway	機1	0-6-0T	1-3	later Japanese Government Railways Class 1280 1280
505-506	1897	2	Kansai Railway	磨墨 (Surusumi)	2-4-2T	21-22	later Japanese Government Railways Class 870 870-871
513-515	1897	3	Chūgoku Railway	2	0-6-0T	2-4	later Japanese Government Railways Class 1220 1221-1223
519-520	1897	2	Ohmi Railway	甲1 (Kou1)	2-4-2T	1-2	3 ft 6 in (1,067 mm) gauge.
542-547	1898	6	Kansai Railway	磨墨 (Surusumi)	2-4-2T	46-51	later Japanese Government Railways Class 870 872-877
550–551	1894	2	Elgoibar-San Sebastián, Biscay Central	130T	2-6-0T	various	To Ferrocarriles Vascongados in 1906.
552–557	1899	6	Furness Railway	7	0-6-0	7–12	to LMS 12468–12473 in 1923
558–560	1899	3	Cambrian Railways		0-4-4T	8, 9, 23	to Great Western Railway 19–21 in 1922
561–562	1899	2	Neath and Brecon Railway		0-6-0ST	7–8	to Great Western Railway 2174–2175 in 1922
584–586	1900	3	Brecon and Merthyr Railway		0-6-0T	27–29	later Great Western Railway 2171–2173
588–593	1900	6	North Staffordshire Railway	159	0-6-0	159–164	to LMS 2351–2356 in 1923
619-620	1901	2	Kansai Railway	磨墨 (Surusumi)	2-4-2T	?	later Japanese Government Railways Class 870 878-879
635-638	1902	4	Kansai Railway	磨墨 (Surusumi)	2-4-2T	74-77	later Japanese Government Railways Class 870 880-883
689–693	1904	5	Furness Railway	98	0-6-2T	98–102	to LMS 11625–11629 in 1923
697–700	1904	4	Donegal Railway	4	4-6-4T	12–15	3 ft (914 mm) gauge. To County Donegal Railways Joint Committee in 1906; renumbered 9–12 in 1937
701–706	1904	6	East Indian Railway		0-4-0ST	1/980 to 6/980	5 ft 6 in (1,676 mm) gauge. Construction locomotives.
748–750	1905	3	East Indian Railway		0-4-0ST	7/85 to 9/885	5 ft 6 in (1,676 mm) gauge. Construction locomotives.
794–798	1907	5	East Indian Railway	M	Railmotor	1350–1354	5 ft 6 in (1,676 mm) gauge. Rebuilt as works shunters between 1927 and 1929
800–809	1907	10	Buenos Aires Great Southern Railway	8B	2-6-2T	289–298	5 ft 6 in (1,676 mm) gauge. Renumbered 3401–3410 in 1912; to Ferrocarril General Roca in 1948
828–833	1907	5	County Donegal Railways Joint Committee	5	2-6-4T	16–20	3 ft (914 mm) gauge. Renumbered 4–8 in 1937; three preserved
834–836	1908	4	Federated Malay States Railways	H2	4-6-2	131–134	1,000 mm (3 ft 3 3/8 in) gauge.
839–842	1908	4	Federated Malay States Railways	H2	4-6-2	79–82	1,000 mm (3 ft 3 3/8 in) gauge.
864–869	1908	6	Assam Bengal Railway	K/2 (BESA G)	4-8-0	130–135	1,000 mm (3 ft 3 3/8 in) gauge.
870–875	1908	6	Assam Bengal Railway	C/1 (BESA T)	2-6-2T	70–75	1,000 mm (3 ft 3 3/8 in) gauge.
911	1910	1	Buenos Aires Midland Railway	F	4-6-0	38	1,000 mm (3 ft 3 3/8 in) gauge.
929–933	1911	5	Great Northern Railway (Ireland)	NQG	0-6-0	9, 109, 112, 38–39	5 ft 3 in (1,600 mm) gauge.
945–947	1911	3	Eastern Bengal Railway	SP	4-4-0	265–267	5 ft 6 in (1,676 mm) gauge. Renumbered 406–408.
950	1911	1	Great Northern Railway (Ireland)	NLQG	0-6-0	165	5 ft 3 in (1,600 mm) gauge.
951–955	1911–12	5	East Indian Railway	G	2-8-0	990–994	5 ft 6 in (1,676 mm) gauge.
956–958	1912	3	County Donegal Railways Joint Committee	5A	2-6-4T	2A, 3A, 21	3 ft (914 mm) gauge. Renumbered 2, 3, 1 in 1937; one preserved
995–1000	1913	6	Bombay Port Trust	A	2-6-0T	1–6	5 ft 6 in (1,676 mm) gauge
1009–1013	1913	5	Kenya-Uganda Railway	EE	2-6-4T	391–395	1,000 mm (3 ft 3 3/8 in) gauge. To East African Railways and Harbours Corporation 1001–1005; EAR&H class 10
1024–1023	1913	10	Bengal Nagpur Railway	B5	2-8-2	0066–0075 not in order	2 ft 6 in (762 mm) gauge.
1026–1031	1914	6	East Indian Railway	BT	2-6-4T	159–164	5 ft 6 in (1,676 mm) gauge. Five renumbered 26821–26825 in all-India scheme.
1032–1033	1914	2	Bombay Port Trust	A	2-6-0T	7–8	5 ft 6 in (1,676 mm) gauge
1041–1043	1913	3	Kenya-Uganda Railway	EE	2-6-4T	396–398	1,000 mm (3 ft 3 3/8 in) gauge. To East African Railways and Harbours Corporation 1006–1008; EAR&H class 10
1054–1059	1914	6	East Indian Railway	ST	0-6-0T	677–682	5 ft 6 in (1,676 mm) gauge. Renumbered 34364–36369 in all-India scheme.
1060–1065	1915	6	South African Railways	J	2-6-4T	341–346	3 ft 6 in (1,067 mm) gauge.
1087–1094	1915	8	Bengal Nagpur Railway	BS1	2-8-2	0076–0083	2 ft 6 in (762 mm) gauge.
1106–1111	1915	6	Bombay Port Trust	A	2-6-0T	9–14	5 ft 6 in (1,676 mm) gauge
1115–1119	1921	5	Great Northern Railway (Ireland)	T2	4-4-2T	1–5	5 ft 3 in (1,600 mm) gauge. Subcontracted to Beyer, Peacock & Co.
1120–1139	1916–17	20	Chemins de fer de l'État	140-101	2-8-0	140-251 to 140-270	
1244–1267	1917–1918	24	Railway Operating Division	ROD 2-8-0	2-8-0	1701–1724	
1269–1280	1919	12	Taff Vale Railway	A	0-6-2T	various	to Great Western Railway in 1922
1281–1288	1919	8	Railway Operating Division	ROD 2-8-0	2-8-0	1725–1732	
1322–1332	1921	11	Assam Bengal Railway	H/7 (BESA M)	4-6-0	143–153	1,000 mm (3 ft 3 3/8 in) gauge.
1352	1921	1	Assam Bengal Railway	H/7 (BESA M)	4-6-0	154	1,000 mm (3 ft 3 3/8 in) gauge.
1357–1358	1922	2	Bombay Port Trust	H	2-10-2T	25–26	5 ft 6 in (1,676 mm) gauge hump shunters
1359–1368	1921	10	Bombay Port Trust	A	2-6-0T	15–24	5 ft 6 in (1,676 mm) gauge.
1371–1375	1922	5	Bengal Nagpur Railway	BS3	2-8-2	0096–00100	2 ft 6 in (762 mm) gauge. Renumbered 632–636 in 1957 all-India scheme
1412-1413	1924	2	Royal State Railways of Siam		2-8-2	311-312	1,000 mm (3 ft 3 3/8 in) gauge.
1423–1427	1924	5	Great Northern Railway (Ireland)	T2	4-4-2T	21, 30, 115, 116, 139	5 ft 3 in (1,600 mm) gauge.
1428–1432	1924–25	5	Great Northern Railway (Ireland)	SG2	0-6-0	15–19	5 ft 3 in (1,600 mm) gauge.
1435–1439	1924	5	Great Northern Railway (Ireland)	T2	4-4-2T	142–144, 147, 148	5 ft 3 in (1,600 mm) gauge.
1448–1452	1925	5	London, Midland and Scottish Railway	3P	4-4-2T	2120–2124	Continuation of London, Tilbury and Southend Railway 79 class
1453–1462	1925	10	London, Midland and Scottish Railway	2P	0-4-4T	15260–15269	Continuation of Caledonian Railway 431 Class
1471–1476	1926	6	Nigerian Railways		4-6-2	405–410	3 ft 6 in (1,067 mm) gauge.
1482–1486	1926	5	Barsi Light Railway	F	2-8-2	19–23	2 ft 6 in (762 mm) gauge. Renumbered 712–716 in 1957 all-India scheme
1487–1488	1926	2	Great Indian Peninsula Railway	B/1	2-8-2	13–14	2 ft 6 in (762 mm) gauge. Renumbered 770–771 in 1957 all-India scheme
1489–1491	1926	3	Ceylon Government Railway	B8	4-6-0	229–231	5 ft 6 in (1,676 mm) gauge.
1497–1504	1927	8	South Indian Railway	K	0-6-0	K58–K65	5 ft 6 in (1,676 mm) gauge. Renumbered 37059–37066 in all-India scheme
1525–1526	1927	2	Barsi Light Railway	F	2-8-2	29–30	2 ft 6 in (762 mm) gauge. Renumbered 717–718 in 1957 all-India scheme
1531–1532	1928	2	North Western Railway (India)	ZE	2-8-2	190–191	2 ft 6 in (762 mm) gauge. Renumbered 221–222; renumbered 93–94 in all-India scheme
1533–1536	1928	4	Nigerian Railways		4-6-2	411–414	3 ft 6 in (1,067 mm) gauge.
1539–1543	1928	5	Barsi Light Railway	G	4-6-4	31–35	2 ft 6 in (762 mm) gauge. Renumbered 728–732 in 1957 all-India scheme
1550–1554	1928	5	Eastern Bengal Railway	YB	4-6-2	409–413	1,000 mm (3 ft 3 3/8 in) gauge. To Assam Bengal Railway 251–255 in 1936
1563–1566	1929	4	Bengal Nagpur Railway	RD	2-6-2	07–010	2 ft 6 in (762 mm) gauge, for Raipur–Dhamtari line; renumbered 687–690 in 1957 all-India scheme
1574–1576	1929	3	Barsi Light Railway	F	2-8-2	36–38	2 ft 6 in (762 mm) gauge. Renumbered 719–721 in 1957 all-India scheme
1586–1587	1930	2	Barsi Light Railway	G	4-6-4	4–5	2 ft 6 in (762 mm) gauge. Renumbered 725–726 in 1957 all-India scheme
	1934	4	Palestine Railway	N	0-6-0T		
	1935	4	Palestine Railway	N	0-6-0T		
1649–1650	1938	2	South Indian Railway	ST	2-6-4T	ST1–ST2	1,000 mm (3 ft 3 3/8 in) gauge. Renumbered 37366–37367 in all-India scheme
1651–1652	1938	2	Palestine Railway	N	0-6-0T		

== Bibliography ==
- Baxter, Bertram (1982). Baxter, David (ed.). British Locomotive Catalogue 1825–1923. Vol. 3A: Midland Railway and its constituent companies. Ashbourne, Derbyshire: Moorland Publishing Company. ISBN 9780903485524.
- Baxter, Bertram (1984). Baxter, David (ed.). British Locomotive Catalogue 1825–1923. Vol. 4: Scottish and remaining English Companies in the LMS Group. Ashbourne, Derbyshire: Moorland Publishing Company.
- Baxter, Bertram (2012). Baxter, David; Mitchell, Peter (eds.). British Locomotive Catalogue 1825–1923. Vol. 6: Great Eastern Railway, North British Railway, Great North of Scotland Railway, Midland & Great Northern Joint Railway, remaining companies in the LNER group. Southampton: Kestrel Railway Books. ISBN 978-1-905505-26-5.
- Boddy, M. G.; Brown, W. A.; Neve, E.; Yeadon, W. B. (November 1983). Fry, E. V. (ed.). Locomotives of the L.N.E.R., Part 6B: Tender Engines—Classes O1 to P2. Kenilworth: RCTS. ISBN 0-901115-54-1.
- Cantrell, John (April 2005). Nasmyth, Wilson & Co.: Patricroft Locomotive Builders. Stroud: Tempus Publishing Limited. ISBN 0-7524-3465-9.
- Bradley, D.L. (1965). Locomotives of the London and South Western Railway. Railway Correspondence and Travel Society.
- Cotterell, Paul (1984). The Railways of Palestine and Israel. Abingdon: Tourret Publishing. ISBN 0-905878-04-3.
- Davies, John (August 2001). Chemins de fer de l'État Locomotive List 1878–1938. Woodbridge, Queensland: Dr. John Davies. ISBN 0-7316-8442-7.
- Hughes, Hugh (1990). Indian Locomotives: Part 1 – Broad Gauge 1851–1940. Harrow, Middlesex: The Continental Railway Circle. ISBN 0-9503469-8-5. OCLC 21871114.
- Hughes, Hugh (1992). Indian Locomotives: Part 2 – Metre Gauge 1872–1940. Harrow, Middlesex: The Continental Railway Circle. ISBN 0-9503469-9-3. OCLC 26549293.
- Hughes, Hugh (1994). Indian Locomotives: Part 3 – Narrow Gauge 1863–1940. Harrow, Middlesex: The Continental Railway Circle. ISBN 0-9521655-0-3. OCLC 39496543.
- Holland, D. F. (1972). Steam Locomotives of the South African Railways. Vol. 2: 1910-1955 (1st ed.). Newton Abbott, England: David & Charles. ISBN 978-0-7153-5427-8.
- Lowe, J. W. (1989). British Steam Locomotive Builders. Guild Publishing.
- Musson, Albert Edward; Robinson, Eric (1969). Science and technology in the Industrial Revolution. Manchester University Press. p. 491. ISBN 978-0-7190-0370-7.
- Reed, P. J. T. (February 1953). White, D. E. (ed.). The Locomotives of the Great Western Railway, Part 2: Broad Gauge. Kenilworth: RCTS. ISBN 0-901115-32-0. OCLC 650490992.
- Rowledge, J.W.P. (1975). Engines of the LMS built 1923–51. Oxford: Oxford Publishing Company. ISBN 0-902888-59-5.
- Rowledge, J. W. P. (1993). Irish Steam Locomotive Register. Stockport, Merseyside: Irish Traction Group. ISBN 0-947773-33-9.
- Smiles, Samuel (1912). James Nasmyth Engineer: An Autobiography. John Murray.
- Inoue, Kouichi (2014). 図説国鉄蒸気機関車全史. JTB Publishing.
- Shirato, Sadao [in Japanese] (1 July 1970). "私鉄車両めぐり83 近江鉄道上(Shitetsu syaryo meguri 83 Ohmi tetsudo jo)". Tetsudo pictorial (239). Denkisha kenkyukai: 84–92.
