= LT&SR 79 Class =

4-4-2 tank locomotive class used by the London, Tilbury & Southend Railway

LT&SR 79 class
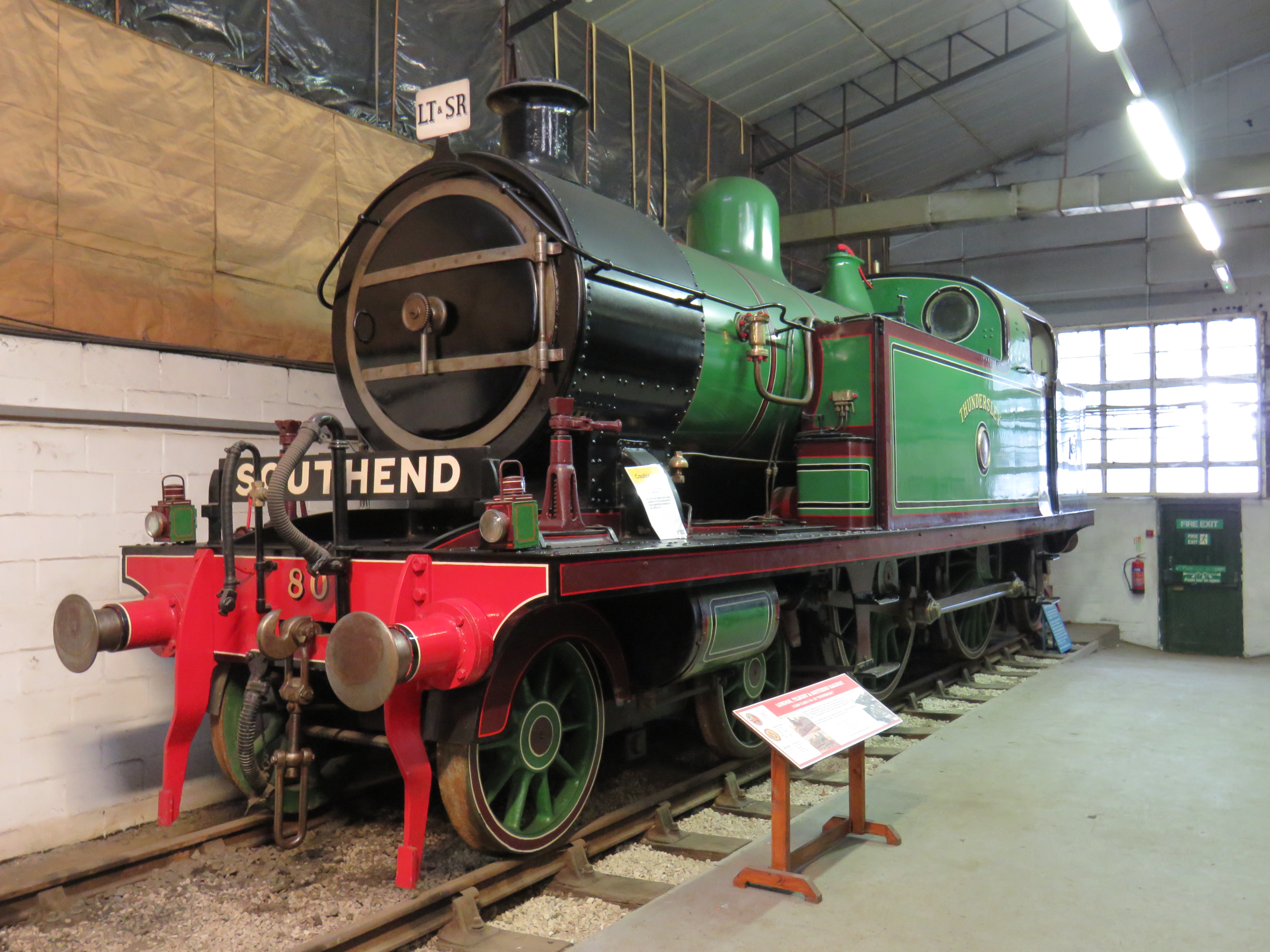
- Preserved LTSR 4-4-2T No. 80 Thundersley
Type and origin
- Power type: Steam
- Designer: Thomas Whitelegg
- Builder: Robert Stephenson & Co. (4), Nasmyth, Wilson & Co. (5), Derby Works (30)
- Serial number: RS 3366–3369, NW 1448–1452
- Build date: 1909–1930
- Total produced: 39
Specifications
- Configuration
  - Whyte: 4-4-2T
  - UIC: 2′B1 t
- Gauge: 4 ft 8 1/2 in (1,435 mm)
- Leading dia.: 3 ft 6 in (1.067 m)
- Driver dia.: 6 ft 6 in (1.981 m)
- Trailing dia.: 3 ft 6 in (1.067 m)
- Wheelbase: 30 ft 9 1/2 in (9.39 m)
- Length: 39 ft 0 in (11.89 m)
- Loco weight: 71.50 long tons (72.65 t)
- Fuel type: Coal
- Fuel capacity: 2.75 long tons (2.79 t)
- Water cap.: 1,800 imp gal (8,200 L; 2,200 US gal)
- Boiler pressure: 170 psi (1.17 MPa)
- Cylinders: Two, outside
- Cylinder size: 19 in × 26 in (483 mm × 660 mm)
- Valve gear: Stephenson
Performance figures
- Tractive effort: 17,390 lbf (77.4 kN)
Career
- Operators: LTSR; →MR; →LMS; →BR
- Power class: MR/LMS/BR: 3P
- Number in class: 1 January 1923: 4; 1 January 1948: 39
- Locale: London Midland Region
- Withdrawn: 1951–1960
- Disposition: One preserved, remainder scrapped

The London, Tilbury and Southend Railway (LTSR) 79 Class is a class of 4-4-2T suburban tank engines. They were designed by Thomas Whitelegg, as a development of the earlier 37 Class. They could reach a top speed of 65 mph (105 km/h).

The four locomotives ordered by the LTSR were numbered 79–82 and were named after places in Essex, near the LTSR route. After absorption by the Midland Railway in 1912, they were renumbered 2176–2179 and their names were removed. The Midland gave them the power classification 3P, and later continued construction; an order for 10 locomotives was delivered in 1923, just after grouping.

== Locomotives ==
LTSR No.	LTSR Name	Builder	Built	Midland/LMS 1923 No.	LMS 1930 No.	BR No.	Withdrawn
79	Rippleside	RS 3366	1909	2176	2147	41965	1951
80	Thundersley	RS 3367	1909	2177	2148	41966	1956
81	Aveley	RS 3368	1909	2178	2149	41967	1952
82	Crowstone	RS 3369	1909	2179	2150	41968	1951

== Additional orders ==
In addition to those constructed by the LTSR and MR, 35 were delivered to the London, Midland and Scottish Railway (LMS) – ten in 1923, five in 1925, ten in 1927, and a final 10 in 1930. The ten delivered in 1923 were to an outstanding order placed by the MR, the remainder were ordered by the LMS. The five delivered in 1925 were built by Nasmyth, Wilson and Company, with the other thirty built by the LMS's Derby Works. In 1947 the LMS assigned them the numbers 1928–1975, to clear their previous numbers for new LMS Fairburn 2-6-4T locomotives, but none of these was applied before nationalisation in 1948, leaving British Railways to apply the numbers 41928–41975.

LMS Lot No.	Built	Builder	LMS No.	BR No.	Withdrawn
Lot 5	1923	Derby Works	2110–2119	41928–41937	1951–1959
Lot 24	1925	NW 1448–1452	2120–2124	41938–41942	1952–1959
Lot 48	1927	Derby Works	2125–2134	41943–41952	1956–1960
Lot 70	1930	Derby Works	2151–2160	41969–41978	1955–1959

They were later displaced from the London, Tilbury and Southend Railway and found work on ex-Midland lines in the East Midlands.

== Preservation ==
One, 80 Thundersley has been preserved and is on static display at the Bressingham Steam and Gardens in Norfolk.
