= JGR Class 2120 =

Japanese steam locomotive type

JGR Class 2120 Mantetsu Class 2120 Taiwan Railways Class CK80
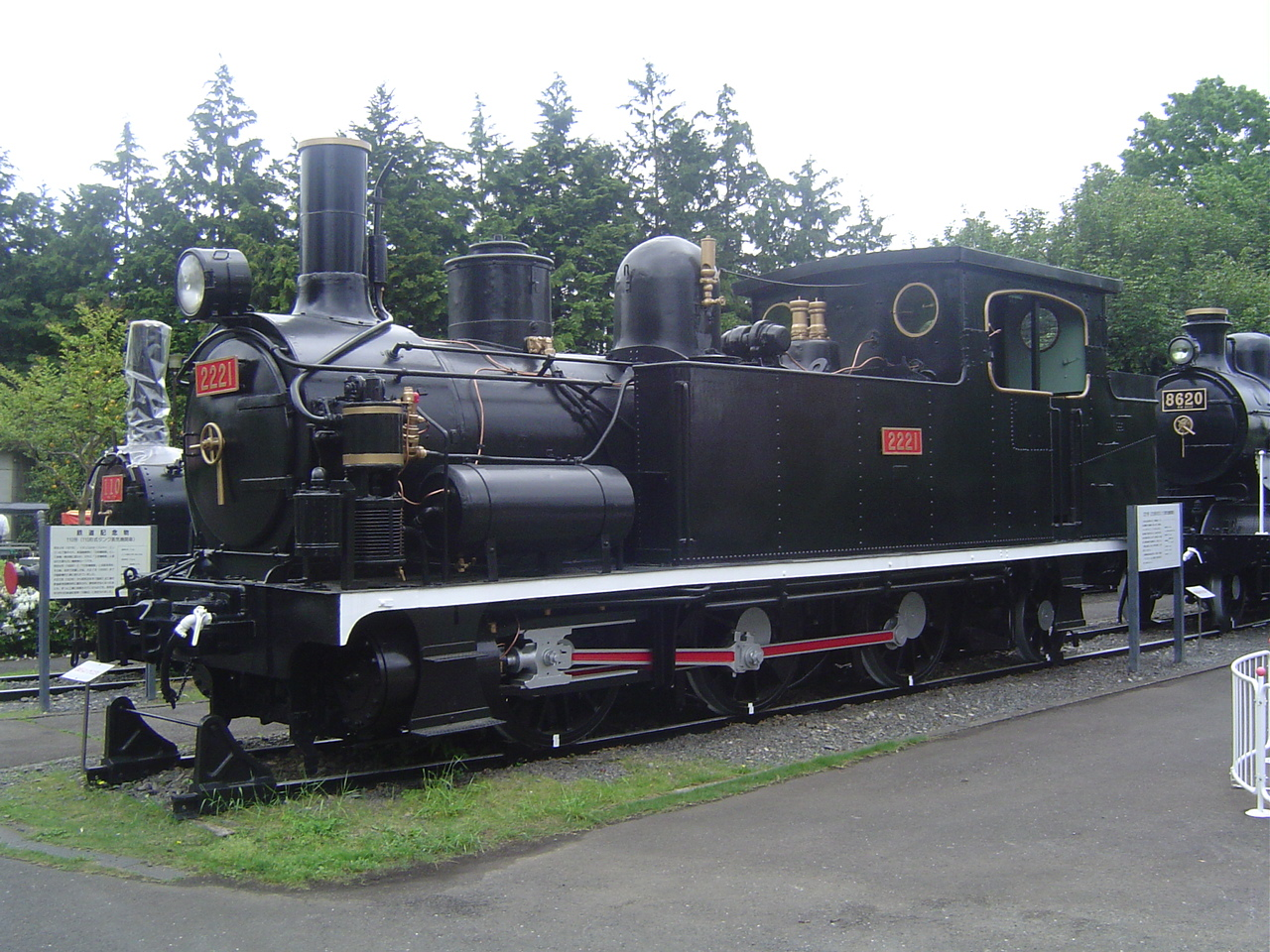
- Class 2120 locomotive preserved at Ome Railway Park
Type and origin
- Power type: Steam
- Builder: Dübs and Company, Sharp, Stewart and Company, North British Locomotive Company, JGR - Kobe
- Build date: 1890-
- Total produced: 268
Specifications
- Configuration
  - Whyte: 0-6-2T
- Gauge: 1,067 mm (3 ft 6 in)
- Driver dia.: 1,250 mm (49.21 in)
- Trailing dia.: 970 mm (38.19 in)
- Wheelbase: 6.02 m (19 ft 9 in)
- Length: 10.371 m (34 ft 1/4 in)
- Loco weight: 51.23 t (50.42 long tons; 56.47 short tons)
- Fuel type: Coal
- Fuel capacity: 1.9 t (1.87 long tons; 2.09 short tons)
- Water cap.: 7.8 m^{3} (2,061 US gal; 1,716 imp gal)
- Firebox
  - Grate area: 1.33 m^{2} (14 sq ft)
- Boiler pressure: 12 kg/cm^{2} (171 lbf/in^{2}; 1,177 kPa)
- Heating surface: 73 m^{2} (786 sq ft)
- Cylinders: Two
- Cylinder size: 40.6 cm × 55.9 cm (16 in × 22 in)
- Valve gear: Stephenson
Performance figures
- Tractive effort: 7,690kg

The JGR Class 2120 was a B6 type 0-6-2 steam tank locomotive used on Japanese Government Railways for shunting and pulling freight cars. The earliest locomotives of this type were imported from Great Britain. One is preserved at the Ome Railway Park in Ome, Tokyo.

During the Russo-Japanese War, the Imperial Japanese Army captured the southern portion of the Russian-owned Chinese Eastern Railway. The Japanese converted the lines under their control to Japanese 1,067 mm gauge, and sent 187 Class 2120 locomotives to the newly established South Manchuria Railway (Mantetsu) in 1905. However, in 1908, Mantetsu completed the conversion of its lines to standard gauge, rendering these locomotives useless. Five were sent directly to the Taiwan Government Railway, and the rest were returned to Japan. The Taiwan Government Railway eventually received a further ten, where they became class CK80.

Same type locomotives were also built in Germany and United States. They were called Class 2400 and Class 2500.

== See also ==
- Japan Railways locomotive numbering and classification
- List of operational steam locomotives in Japan
