= JGR Class 5500 =

Japanese type 4-4-0 steam locomotive

Class 5500
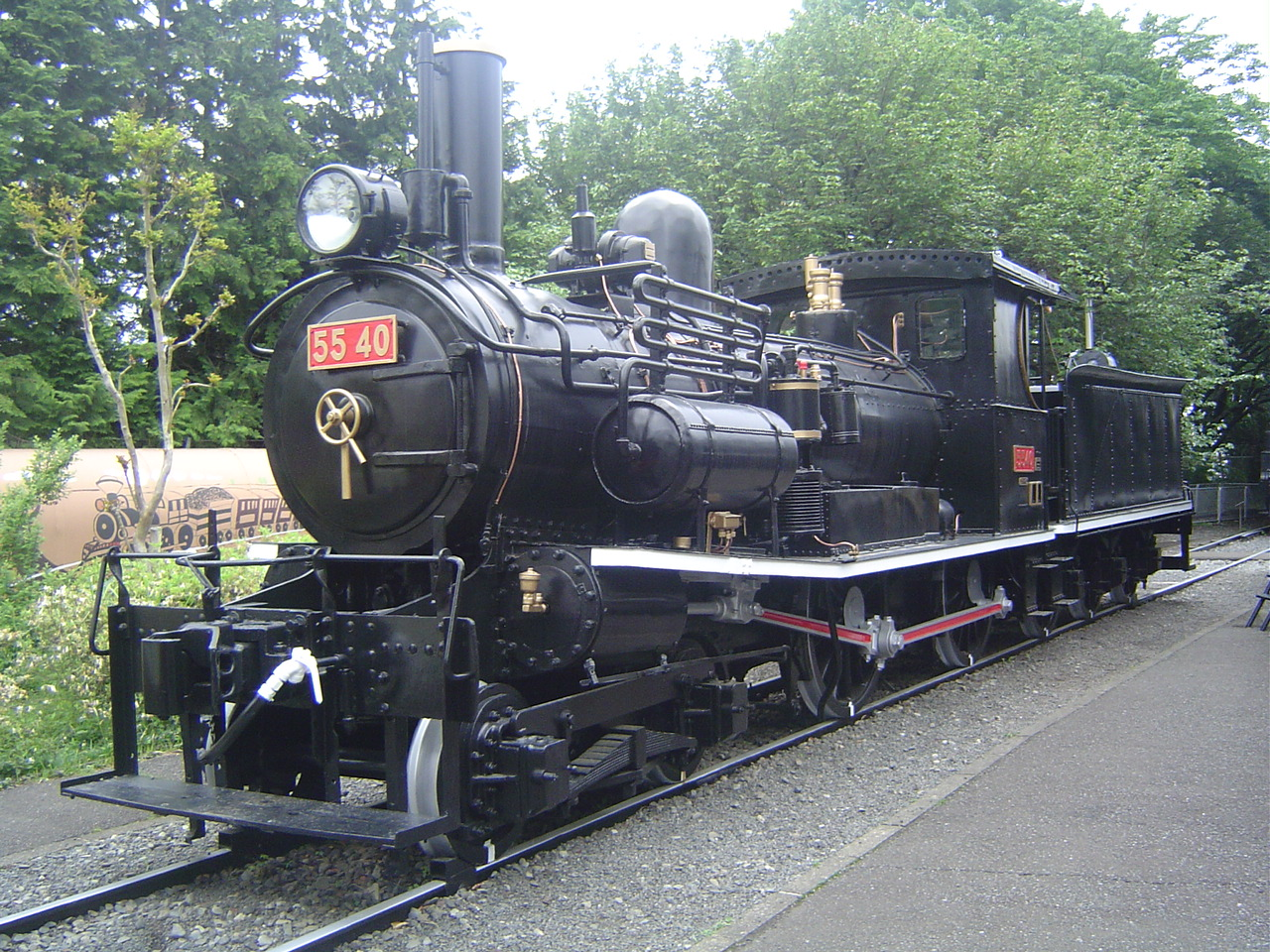
- Type 5500 locomotive preserved at Ome Railway Park
Type and origin
- Power type: Steam
- Builder: Beyer, Peacock & Company
- Build date: 1893-
- Total produced: 72
Specifications
- Configuration
  - Whyte: 4-4-0 Eight-wheeler
- Gauge: 1,067 mm (3 ft 6 in)
- Leading dia.: 730 mm (2 ft 5 in)
- Driver dia.: 1.4 m (4 ft 7 in)
- Wheelbase: 6.578 m (21 ft 7.0 in)
- Length: 13.91 m (45 ft 8 in)
- Loco weight: 31.65 t
- Total weight: 55.85 t
- Fuel type: Coal
- Fuel capacity: 3.46 t
- Water cap.: 9.1 m^{3} (2,404 US gal)
- Firebox
  - Grate area: 1.33 m^{2} (14 sq ft)
- Boiler pressure: 12 kg/cm^{2} (170 lbf/in^{2})
- Heating surface: 73 m^{2} (786 sq ft)
- Cylinders: Two
- Cylinder size: 40.6 cm × 55.9 cm (16 in × 22 in)
- Valve gear: Stephenson
Performance figures
- Tractive effort: 5,990 kg (13,210 lb)

The JGR Class 5500 was a type of 4-4-0 steam locomotive used for 60 years on Japanese Government Railways. The locomotives were built by Beyer, Peacock & Company in England. Sulfur was added to the forged steel used for the cylinders. The cylinders were set in a slightly canted position and were used without replacement for the entire life of the locomotive. Japan was unable to produce cylinders of comparable durability. In 1929, ten were converted to tank locomotives and reclassified as Class B10.

One Class 5500 locomotive, 5540, is preserved at the Ome Railway Park. A Class B10 locomotive, B104, is preserved at the Kominato Railway headquarters.

== See also ==
- Japan Railways locomotive numbering and classification
