= Locomotives of the Caledonian Railway =

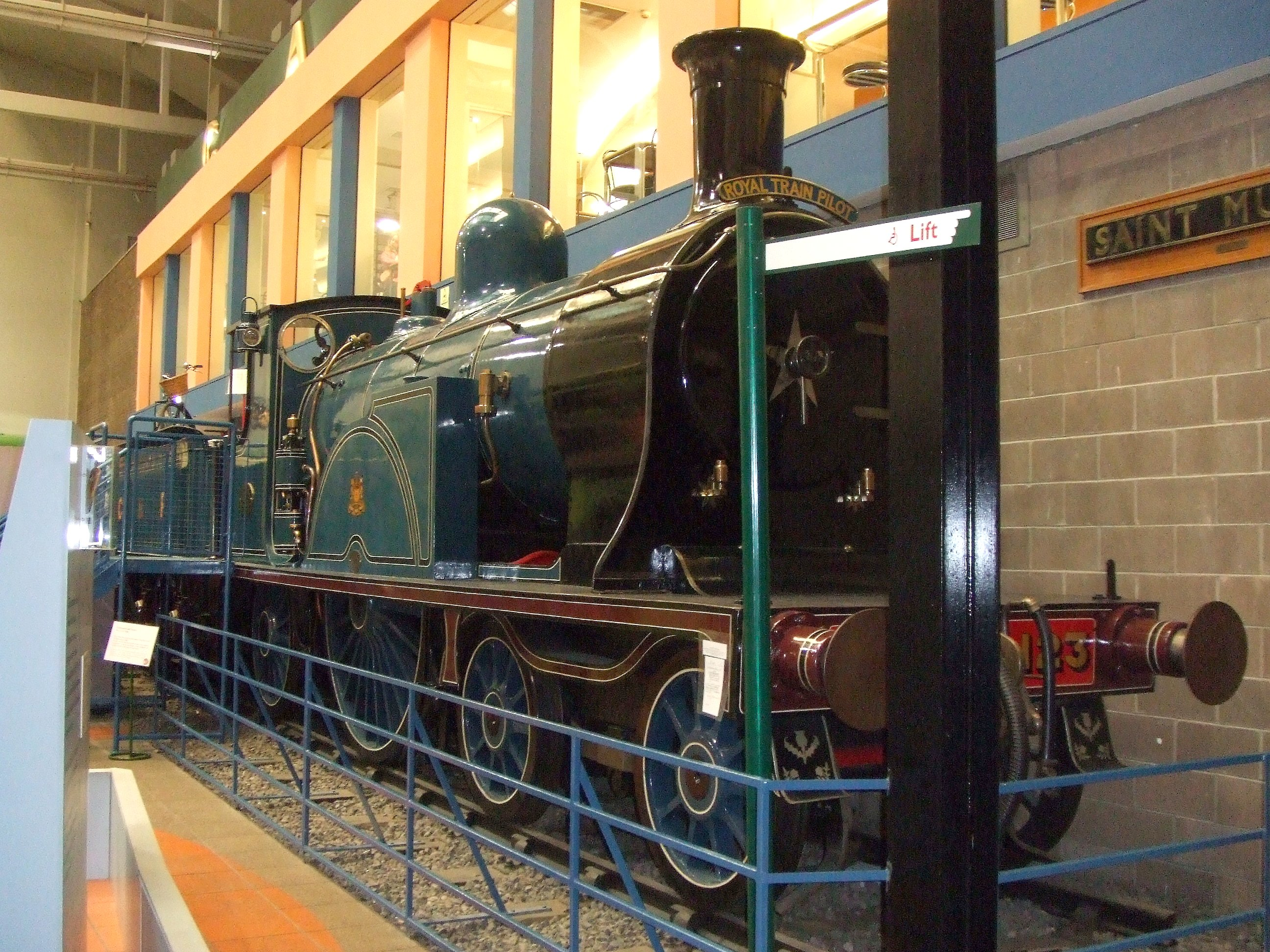
Caledonian Railway Class "123" 4-2-2 No.123, built in 1886 by Neilson (Works No.3553) specifically for the Edinburgh International Exhibition.

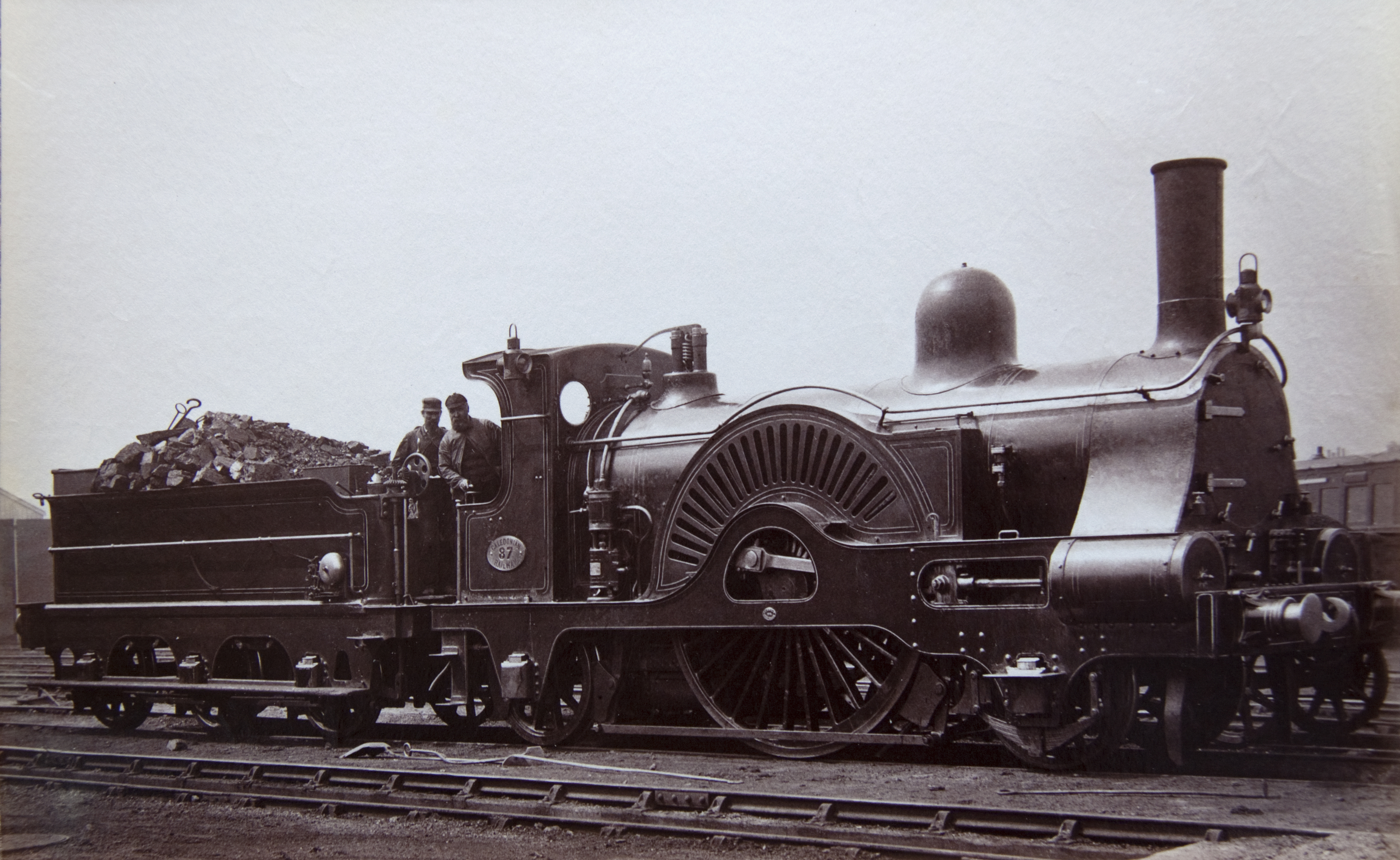
An example of the 8ft 2" wheeled Caledonian 2-2-2. They were built from 1859 onwards and served as the main express engine until 1885. The final engine was withdrawn from service in 1901.

Locomotives of the Caledonian Railway. The Caledonian Railway Locomotive Works were originally at Greenock but moved to St. Rollox, Glasgow, in 1856. The locomotive classes are listed under the names of the railway's Chief Mechanical Engineers.

== Locomotives ==
The class number used for Caledonian Railway engines was the stock number of the first member of the class to reach traffic. Hence earlier numbered classes could well have appeared later in time.

Until the appointment of Dugald Drummond, unlike most other British railways, almost all engines had outside cylinders, and the 0-6-0 arrangement was quite rare, goods engines being of type 2-4-0 or 0-4-2. Passenger engines were normally 2-2-2.

=== Robert Sinclair 1847–1856 ===
Wheel Arrangement	Class	Date	Builder	No. built	Notes
2-2-2	4	1847-9	CR Greenock (30); Vulcan Foundry (12); Jones & Potts (10); Scott Sinclair (3)	55	13 rebuilt as 2-4-0, 3 as 2-2-2WT
2-2-2	59	1848–52	Jones & Potts	6	all rebuilt 1857–65 as 2-4-0
2-2-2	65	1854-5	CR Greenock	12	
2-4-0	144	1854	George England	8	
2-4-0	152	1854-5	CR Greenock	13	
2-4-0	165	1855	CR Greenock	6	
0-4-2	111	1847-9	R&W Hawthorn	3	
0-4-2	113	1847	Neilson & Mitchell	6	
0-4-2	101	1848	CR Greenock	5	
0-4-2	106	1849	CR Greenock	5	
0-4-2	132	1853	Neilson	4	
0-4-2	171	1855	CR Greenock	3	
0-4-2	174	1856-8	St. Rollox	8	
2-4-0T	80	1854	Hawthorn of Leith	2	
0-4-0ST	136	1853	CR Greenock	8	6 later rebuilt as 0-4-2T
0-4-0ST	83	1854-5	Hawthorn of Leith	1	
0-4-2ST	87	1854-5	Hawthorn of Leith	2	
2-2-2WT	77	1851	CR Greenock	3	
0-4-0	116	1848	Fairbairn	2	1 rebuilt as 0-4-2T, both sold 1863
0-6-0	96	1849–50	Jones & Potts (5); CR Greenock (10)	15	later rebuilt to 0-4-2

=== Benjamin Conner 1856–1876 ===
Wheel Arrangement	Class	Dates	Builder	No. built	Notes
2-2-2	76	1859–64	St. Rollox	12	8 ft 2 in wheels
2-2-2	113	1875	St. Rollox	4	8 ft 2 in wheels
2-2-2	88	1864	St. Rollox	4	7 ft 2 in wheels
2-2-2	460	1871	A. Barclay	1	7 ft 2 in wheels – Experimental design
0-4-2	216	1861-6	Neilson (34)	64	
0-4-2	216	1861-6	Dübs (30)	64	
0-4-2	552	1870-1	Dübs (18)	31	
0-4-2	552	1870-1	Neilson (13)	31	
0-4-2	324	1872-4	Neilson	40	
2-4-0	189	1858-9	St. Rollox (4)	8	
2-4-0	189	1858-9	Neilson (4)	8	with steam tenders
2-4-0	197	1860-3	St. Rollox (10)	25	
2-4-0	197	1860-3	Neilson (9)	25	
2-4-0	197	1860-3	Beyer-Peacock (6)	25	
2-4-0	228	1861-6	Neilson (9)	18	
2-4-0	228	1861-6	Dübs (9)	18	
2-4-0	92	1865-7	St. Rollox	11	
2-4-0	288	1865-6	Dübs	10	
2-4-0	417	1866–70	Neilson	37	
2-4-0	98	1867–73	St. Rollox (10)	28	
2-4-0	98	1867–73	Neilson (18)	28	
2-4-0	472	1868	Caledonian Railway, Perth	2	
2-4-0	1	1869–74	Dübs (14)	35	
2-4-0	1	1869–74	Neilson (21)	35	
2-4-0	372	1870	Neilson	16	
2-4-0	583	1872-3	Dübs	31	
2-4-0	42	1874	Dübs	7	
2-4-0	55	1875	Neilson	4	
2-4-0	615	1874-8	Dübs (19)	29	
2-4-0	615	1874-8	Neilson (10)	29	
4-4-0	125	1877	Neilson	5	
0-4-0PT	236	1862	Neilson	4	
0-4-0PT	270	1865	A. Barclay	2	
0-4-0ST	123	1867	Neilson	1	
0-4-0ST	15	1869–72	A. Barclay	6	
0-4-0ST	133	1872-4	A. Barclay	2	
0-4-0T	446	1873	Dübs	2	
0-4-0ST	502	1876–81	Neilson	14	
0-4-4WT	488	1873-4	Neilson	4	
0-6-0ST	139	1870	Neilson	2	
0-6-0ST	536	1871-5	Neilson (8)	14	
0-6-0ST	536	1871-5	Dübs (6)	14	
0-6-0ST	141	1873	Neilson	1	
0-6-0	188	1858	Neilson	1	
0-6-0	120	1872	St. Rollox	1	
0-6-0	631	1874-7	Dübs	39	

=== George Brittain 1876–1882 ===
Wheel Arrangement	Class	Date	Builder	No. built	LMS power classification	LMS numbers	Notes
2-4-0	130	1878	Dübs	10			
0-4-2	670	1878–82	Dübs	30	U	17000–17020	
4-4-0	179	1882	Dübs	10	1P	14100–14107	"Oban bogie"
0-4-0T	485	1878	Neilson	1			Crane tank
2-4-0T	140	1879	Dübs	12			
2-4-2T	152	1880	Neilson	15			
2-2-2WT	1	1881	St. Rollox	1			For officer's saloon
0-6-0ST	486	1881	Neilson	6	1F	16150	Withdrawn before LMS number could be applied

=== Dugald Drummond 1882–1890 ===
Wheel Arrangement	Class	Date	Builder	No. built	LMS power classification	LMS numbers	Notes
4-2-2	123	1886	Neilson	1	1P	14010	Won Gold medal at Edinburgh International Exhibition 1886
4-4-0	80	1888–91	St. Rollox	12	1P	14108–14115	"Coast bogies"
4-4-0	66	1884–91	Neilson (10); St. Rollox (18)	28	1P	14290–14309	
4-4-0	124	1886	Dübs	1	1P	14296	Exhibition engine – related to "66" class
0-4-2ST	262	1885	St. Rollox	2	U	15000–15001	
0-4-4T	171	1884–91	St. Rollox	24	1P	15100–15114	
0-4-0ST	264	1885–90	St. Rollox	20	U	16008–16025	
0-6-0ST	272	1888	St. Rollox	6	U	16100–16102	
0-6-0ST	323	1887-8	St. Rollox	30	3F	16202–16224	
0-6-0	294	1883–95	Neilson (35); St. Rollox (128)	163	2F	17230–17392	

=== Hugh Smellie 1890 ===
Appointed 1 September 1890. Died 19 April 1891.

=== John Lambie 1891–1895 ===
Unless otherwise stated these were all built at the Caledonian Railway's St. Rollox railway works

Wheel Arrangement	Class	Date	No. built	LMS power classification	LMS numbers	Notes
4-4-0	13	1894	6	1P	14308–14310	
4-4-0T	1	1893-4	12	1P	15020–15031	
0-4-4T	19	1895	10	2P	15115–15124	
0-4-0ST	538A	1892	2			Second-hand – built 1872–3 by Dübs and Company
0-6-0ST	211	1895	5	3F	16225–16229	

=== John F. McIntosh 1895–1914 ===
Unless otherwise stated these were all built at the Caledonian Railway's St. Rollox railway works

Wheel Arrangement	Class	Date	No. built	LMS power classification	LMS numbers	Notes
4-4-0 (Dunalastairs)	721	1896	15	2P	14311–14325	Dunalastair I
4-4-0 (Dunalastairs)	766	1897–98	15	2P/3P	14326–14336 & 14430–14433	Dunalastair II – 4 rebuilt 1914 with superheaters
4-4-0 (Dunalastairs)	900	1899–1900	16	2P/3P	14337–14348 & 14434–14437	Dunalastair III – 6 rebuilt 1914–30 with superheaters
4-4-0 (Dunalastairs)	140	1904–10	19	2P/3P	14349–14365 & 14438–14439	Dunalastair IV – 4 rebuilt 1915–22 with superheaters
4-4-0 (Dunalastairs)	139	1910–12	11	3P	14440–14449	Schmidt superheater
4-4-0 (Dunalastairs)	43	1913–14	11	3P	14450–14460	Robinson superheater
4-6-0	55	1902–05	9	3P	14600–14608	
4-6-0	908	1906–07	10	3P	14609–14618	
4-6-0	49	1903	2	4P	14750–14751	rebuilt 1911 with Schmidt superheaters
4-6-0	903	1906	5	4P	14752–14755	"Cardeans", rebuilt 1911 with Schmidt superheaters
0-4-4T	92	1897	12	2P	15125–15136	
0-4-4T	879	1900	10	2P	15137–15146	
0-4-4T	104	1899	12	1P	15147–15158	
0-4-4T	439	1900–14	68	2P	15159–15226	
0-4-0ST	781	1896	1	U	16000	acquired second hand 1897. Built by A. Barclay
0-4-0ST	611	1895–1908	14	0F	16026–16039	continuation of 264 class
0-6-0T	498	1912–21	23	2F	16151–16173	Short wheelbase
0-6-0T	29	1895–96	9	3F	16231–16239	With condensers for Glasgow Central low-level line
0-6-0T	782	1898–1913	138	3F	16240–16376	
0-8-0T	492	1903–04	6	4F	16500–16505	
0-6-0	711	1895–97	81	2F	17393–17473	Similar to "294" class
0-6-0	812	1899–1900	79	3F	17550–17628	
0-6-0	652	1908–09	17	3F	17629–17645	Modified 812 class
0-6-0	30	1912	4	3F	17646–17649	652 class with superheater
2-6-0	34	1912	5	3F	17800–17804	"Converted 30 class"
4-6-0	918	1906	5	3F	17900–17904	
4-6-0	179	1913–14	5	3F	17905–17909	Superheated
4-6-0	184	1914–15	6	3F	17910–17915	Superheated
0-8-0	600	1901–03	8	4F	17990–17997	

=== William Pickersgill 1914–1923 ===
Wheel Arrangement	Class	Date	Builder	No. built	LMS power classification	LMS numbers	Notes
4-4-0	113	1916	St. Rollox (6); North British (10)	16	3P	14461–14476	
4-4-0	72	1920–2	St. Rollox (10); Armstrong Whitworth (10); North British (12)	32	3P	14477–14508	
4-6-0	191	1922	North British	8	3P	14619–14626	"New Oban Bogies", non-superheated
4-6-0	60	1916–7	St. Rollox	6	4P	14650–14655	"Greybacks", another 20 (14630–14649) built by LMS
4-6-0	938	1915	Hawthorn Leslie	6	4P	14756–14761	"River" class, originally built for Highland Railway.
4-6-0	956	1921	St. Rollox	4	5P	14800–14803	
0-4-4T	159	1915–22	St. Rollox	10	2P	15227–15236	non-superheated
0-4-4T	431	1922	St. Rollox	4	2P	15237–15240	non-superheated, another 10 (15260–15269) built by LMS
4-6-2T	944	1917	North British	12	4P	15350–15361	
0-6-0	300	1918–20	St. Rollox	43	3F	17650–17692	non-superheated (some later converted)
2-8-0	ROD 2-8-0	1919–20	Various	50			GCR design, built for the government. Disposed of 1925–7, many went to China.

== London, Midland and Scottish Railway ==
Caledonian Railway locomotives still existing in 1923 were taken into the stock of the London, Midland and Scottish Railway (LMS). The LMS built some locomotives to Caledonian Railway designs after 1923.

== Preservation ==
Image	CR No.	CR Class	Type	Manufacturer	Serial No.	Date	Notes
	123	Single	4-2-2	Neilson and Company	3553	1886	On static display at the Riverside Museum
	828	812 Class	0-6-0	St Rollox Works		August; 1899	Operational at the Strathspey Railway
	419	439 Class	0-4-4T	St Rollox Works		November; 1907	Operational at the Bo'ness and Kinneil Railway

== See also ==
- List of LMS locomotives as of 31 December 1947

== Sources ==
- Baxter, B., (1984) British Locomotive Catalogue 1825–1923 Vol.4, Moorland Publishing
- Haresnape, B. & Rowledge, P. (1982) Drummond Locomotives, a Pictorial History, Ian Allan
