= Caledonian Railway 55 Class =

Class of 9 British 4-6-0 locomotives

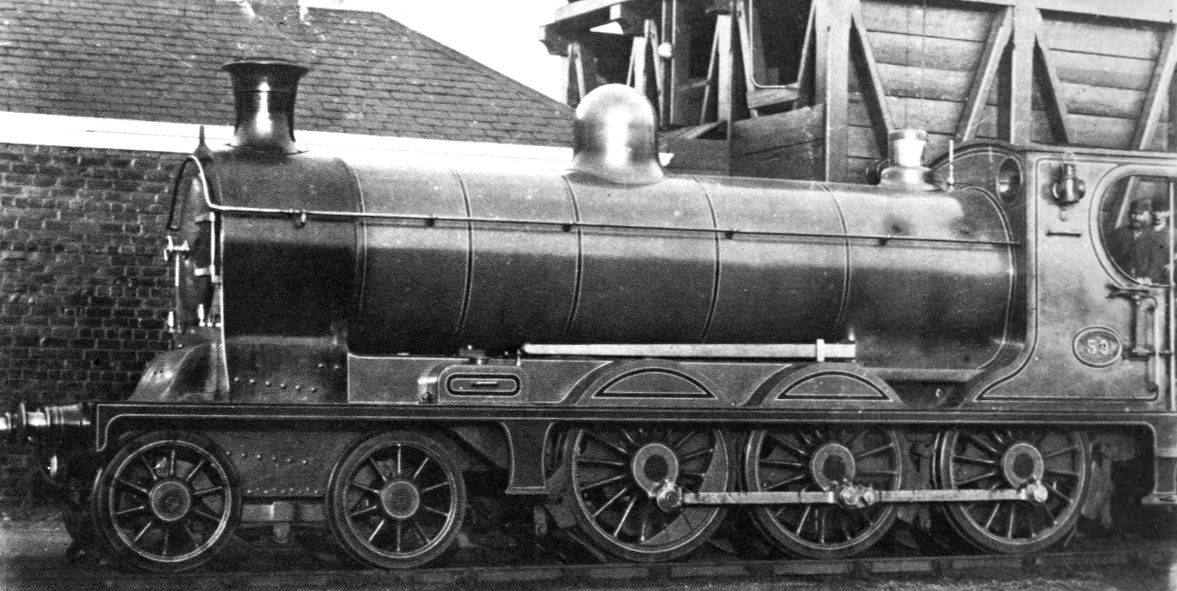
Type and origin
- Power type: Steam
- Designer: John F. McIntosh
- Builder: St. Rollox
- Build date: 1902-05
- Total produced: 9
Specifications
- Configuration
  - Whyte: 4-6-0
- Gauge: 4 ft 8 1/2 in (1,435 mm)
- Driver dia.: 5 ft 0 in (1.52 m)
- Loco weight: 57.4 tons
- Tender weight: 37.3 tons
- Boiler pressure: 175 psi (1,210 kPa)
- Superheater: not superheated
- Cylinders: two, inside
- Cylinder size: 19 in × 26 in (483 mm × 660 mm)
- Valve gear: Stephenson
Performance figures
- Tractive effort: 23,300 lbf (104 kN)
Career
- Operators: CR • LMS
- Class: CR: 55
- Power class: LMS: 3P
- Withdrawn: 1929-1935
- Disposition: All scrapped

The Caledonian Railway 55 Class were 4-6-0 mixed-traffic locomotives designed by John F. McIntosh and built at the railway’s St. Rollox works in Glasgow in 1902-1905. The class was intended for use on the Callander and Oban line and were sometimes known as Oban Bogies, a nickname they shared with the earlier Brittain 179 Class 4-4-0s and the subsequent Pickersgill 191 Class 4-6-0s, all of which were built for use on the same route.

== Design ==
The Oban line had numerous short but steep gradients along with tight curves and lightly constructed bridges, and was therefore a challenging route to operate. McIntosh therefore designed a small 4-6-0 which was essentially an elongated hybrid of his 812 Class 0-6-0 and Dunalastair series 4-4-0 types. The class featured a particularly short driving-wheel wheelbase to cope with the curvature of the line, and short tenders to enable the locomotives to fit onto the existing small turntable at Oban shed. The subsequent 918 Class was very similar to the 55 Class, but had a larger boiler and tender for express goods services on the mainline.

== Construction ==
The locomotives were built in two batches. Numbers 55-59 were built in 1902, whilst numbers 51-54 were built to a slightly modified design in 1905. Throughout their lives the locomotives were used primarily on the Oban line, although number 56 was on extended loan to the Highland Railway between 1916 and 1922.

== LMS ownership ==
The locomotives passed to the LMS upon its formation in 1923, and were renumbered 14600-14608 (ex 55-59, 51-54). The LMS rebuilt two locomotives (14606 and 14607) with larger boilers from withdrawn 918 Class engines in 1930. All were withdrawn and scrapped between 1928 and 1937, having been displaced from the Oban line by former Highland Railway Clan Class 4-6-0s.

== Numbering and locomotive histories ==
CR no.	LMS no.	Delivered	Withdrawn
55	14600	05/1902	09/1929
56	14601	05/1902	10/1934
57	14602	05/1902	02/1928
58	14603	06/1902	10/1935
59	14604	06/1902	12/1936
51	14605	08/1905	02/1937
52	14606	09/1905	11/1937
53	14607	09/1905	10/1934
54	14608	09/1905	11/1935

source: BritishSteam & BRDatabase

== See also ==
- Locomotives of the Caledonian Railway
