= Caledonian Railway 918 Class =

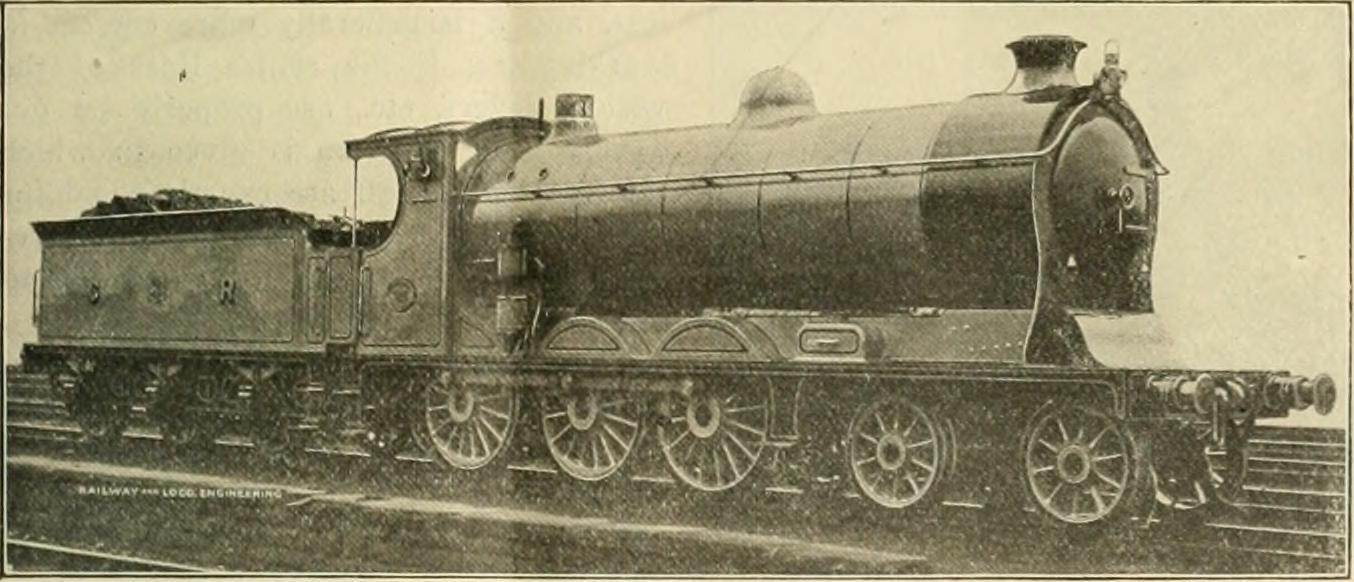
Type and origin
- Power type: Steam
- Designer: John F. McIntosh
- Builder: St. Rollox
- Build date: 1906
- Total produced: 5
Specifications
- Configuration
  - Whyte: 4-6-0
- Gauge: 4 ft 8 1/2 in (1,435 mm)
- Driver dia.: 5 ft 0 in (1.52 m)
- Length: 17.526 m (57.50 ft)
- Adhesive weight: 46.8 tons
- Loco weight: 60 tons 8 cwt
- Firebox
  - Grate area: 2.41 m^{2} (25.9 sq ft)
- Boiler pressure: 175psi
- Heating surface: 187.47 m (615.1 ft)
- Superheater: not equipped
- Cylinders: Two, inside
- Cylinder size: 19 in × 26 in (483 mm × 660 mm)
- Valve gear: Stephenson
Performance figures
- Tractive effort: 23,269 lbf (103.51 kN)
Career
- Operators: CR • LMS
- Class: CR: 918
- Power class: LMS: 3F
- Disposition: All scrapped

The Caledonian Railway 918 Class were 4-6-0 steam tender locomotives designed by John F. McIntosh and built in 1906, at the Caledonian Railway's own St. Rollox Works.

== Overview ==
McIntosh developed six different classes of 4-6-0 for the Caledonian Railway:

- large 49 and 903 Classes for express passenger traffic, with 6' 6" driving wheels
- intermediate 908 and 179 Classes for mixed traffic, with 5' 9" driving wheels
- small (5') wheeled 55 and 918 Classes for the Oban line and express goods traffic respectively

The 55 class had been introduced in 1902, specifically for use on the Caledonian's Oban line, and the 918 class was a development of the 55 class which was intended for express goods traffic on the main line. Whereas the 55s featured a relatively small boiler to keep axle weights low and very short tenders to keep within the length of the Oban shed turntable, the otherwise similar 918s had larger boilers and tenders.

Although built for freight service they were also used occasionally on passenger trains, and like all Caledonian 4-6-0s they were painted in the Railway's blue passenger livery.

== LMS ownership ==
The locomotives passed into the ownership of the London, Midland and Scottish Railway upon its formation in 1923, and were repainted into the LMS's unlined black freight livery.

They were displaced by new LMS standard locomotives such as the "Crab" 2-6-0s and were withdrawn for scrap between 1929 and 1930. Two of the boilers from the withdrawn 918s were transferred to 55 Class engines at that time, with the result that the receiving locomotives effectively became "quasi-918s" for their last few years.

== Numbering and locomotive histories ==
| CR no. | LMS no. | Delivered | Withdrawn |
|---|---|---|---|
| 918 | 17900 | 07/1906 | 12/1930 |
| 919 | 17901 | 07/1906 | 12/1930 |
| 920 | 17902 | 08/1906 | 12/1930 |
| 921 | 17903 | 08/1906 | 05/1929 |
| 922 | 17904 | 09/1906 | 04/1930 |

source: BritishSteam

== See also ==
- Locomotives of the Caledonian Railway
