= Caledonian Railway 908 Class =

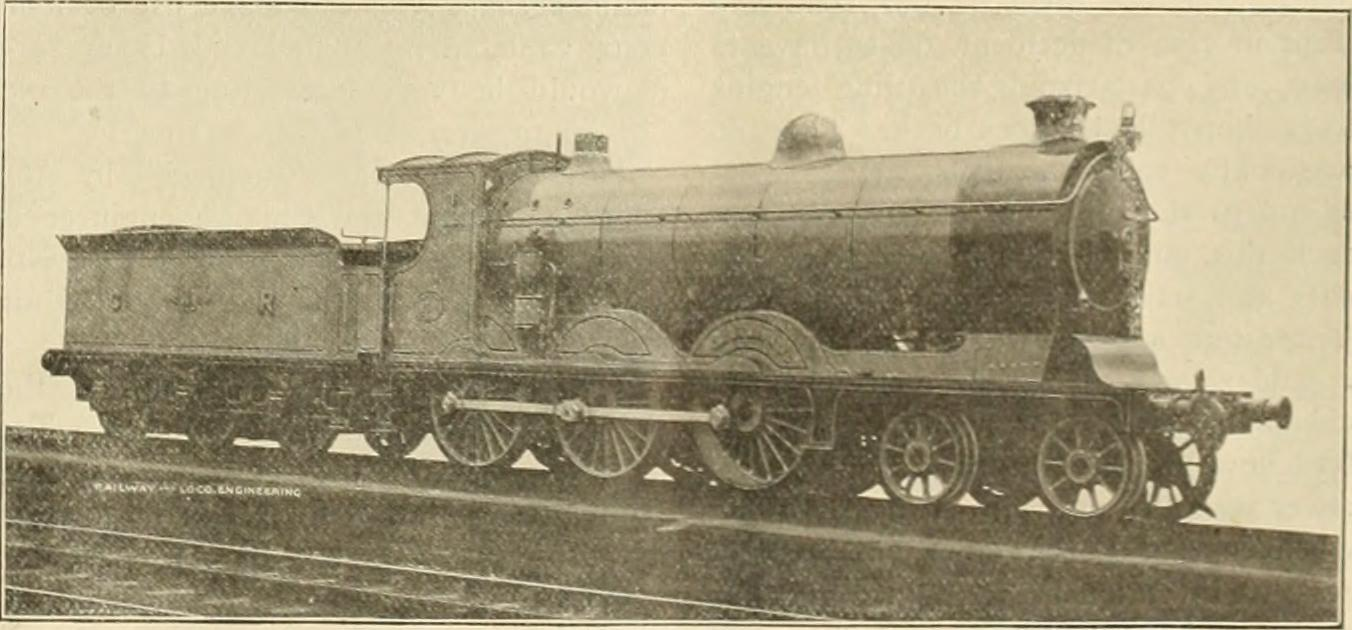
Type and origin
- Power type: Steam
- Designer: John F. McIntosh
- Builder: St. Rollox
- Build date: 1906
- Total produced: 10
Specifications
- Configuration
  - Whyte: 4-6-0
- Gauge: 4 ft 8 1/2 in (1,435 mm)
- Driver dia.: 5 ft 9 in (1.75 m)
- Wheelbase: 5 ft 9 in (1.75 m) + 6 ft 6 in (1.98 m) + 6 ft 8 in (2.03 m) + 6 ft 8 in (2.03 m)
- Length: 17.957 m (58.91 ft)
- Adhesive weight: 49 long tons (50 t; 55 short tons)
- Loco weight: 64 long tons (65 t; 72 short tons)
- Boiler pressure: 180 psi (1,200 kPa)
- Heating surface
  - Firebox: 1.95 m^{2} (21.0 sq ft)
  - Total surface: 202.34 m^{2} (2,178.0 sq ft)
- Superheater: not equipped
- Cylinders: Two, inside
- Cylinder size: 19 in × 26 in (483 mm × 660 mm)
- Valve gear: Stephenson
Performance figures
- Tractive effort: 20,812 lbf (92.58 kN)
Career
- Operators: CR • LMS
- Class: CR: 908
- Power class: LMS: 3P
- Disposition: All scrapped

The Caledonian Railway 908 Class were 4-6-0 mixed traffic locomotives designed by John F. McIntosh and built in 1906, at the Caledonian Railway's own St. Rollox Works.

== Overview ==
McIntosh developed six different classes of 4-6-0 for the Caledonian Railway:

- large 49 and 903 Classes for express passenger traffic, with 6 ft 6 in (1.98 m) driving wheels
- intermediate 908 and 179 Classes for mixed traffic, with 5 ft 9 in (1.75 m) driving wheels
- small (5 ft 0 in (1.52 m)) wheeled 55 and 918 Classes for the Oban line and express goods traffic respectively

Only one batch of ten 908 Class locomotives was built, but the subsequent 179 Class was essentially a superheated version of the 908. All were originally delivered in the Caledonian's blue passenger locomotive livery. Two locomotives were named "Sir James King" and "Barochan" (after the chairman of the Caledonian Railway and the home of its deputy chairman), though these names were later removed.

Although most of the locomotives had cabs of the standard Caledonian Railway style with curved cut-outs on the sides, the last of the batch (number 917) had a more modern style of cab with two arched windows on either cabside. Sources differ as to whether it was built in this form or whether the cab was modified early in the locomotive's life. Apart from No. 917 the only other Caledonian engines to carry side-window cabs were the 179 Class.

== LMS ownership ==
The locomotives passed into the ownership of the London, Midland and Scottish Railway upon its formation in 1923. They were classified as passenger locomotives by the LMS and were therefore repainted into crimson lake livery, although this later gave way to lined black. Oddly, the very similar 179 Class were treated as goods engines by the LMS.

They were displaced by new LMS standard locomotives such as the "Crab" 2-6-0s and were withdrawn for scrap between 1930 and 1935.

== Numbering and locomotive histories ==
CR no.	CR name	LMS no.	Delivered	Withdrawn
908		14609	10/1906	03/1933
909	Sir James King	14610	10/1906	07/1933
910		14611	10/1906	12/1931
911	Barochan	14612	11/1906	11/1931
912		14613	11/1906	09/1932
913		14614	11/1906	05/1930
914		14615	11/1906	11/1931
915		14616	11/1906	03/1930
916		14617	12/1906	04/1931
917		14618	12/1906	02/1935

source: BritishSteam

== See also ==
- Locomotives of the Caledonian Railway
