= 600 class =

600 class or Class 600 may refer to:

- British Rail Class 600, proposed hydrogen fuel cell-powered multiple units
- Caledonian Railway 600 Class, 0-8-0 steam locomotives
- FS Class 600, Italian 2-6-0 steam locomotives
- New South Wales 600/700 class railcar
- NS Class 600, diesel locomotives
- South Australian Railways 600 class (diesel)
- South Australian Railways 600 class (steam), 4-6-2 locomotives
