= Caledonian Railway 812 and 652 Classes =

0-6-0 steam tender locomotives

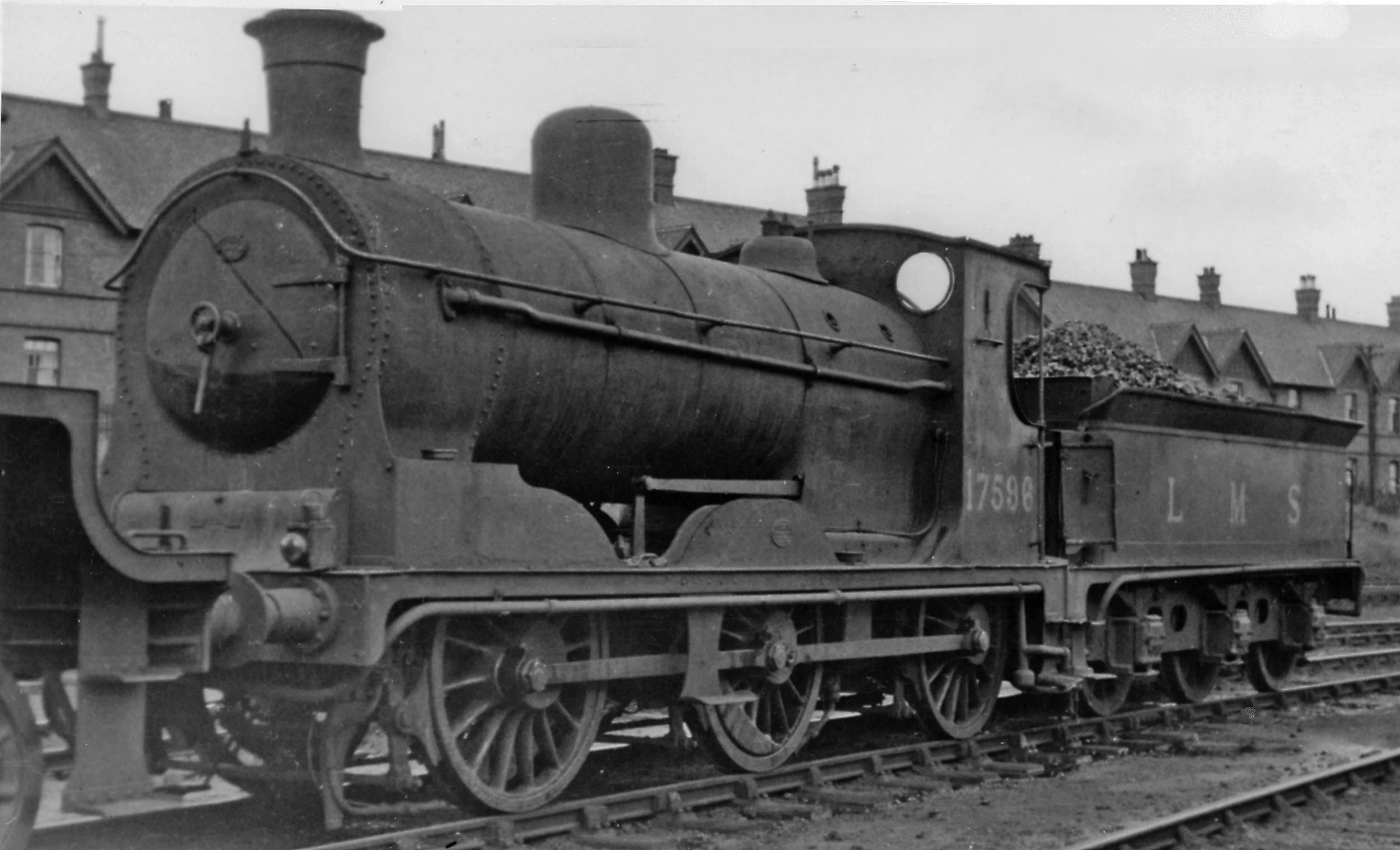
- Ex-CR 812 class No. 17596 at Corkerhill Locomotive Depot on 15 August 1948
Type and origin
- Power type: Steam
- Designer: John F. McIntosh
- Builder: CR St. Rollox Works(46); Dübs & Co. (15); Neilson, Reid & Co. (20); Sharp Stewart (15)
- Build date: 1899–1909
- Total produced: 79 (812) / 17 (652) / 96 (total)
Specifications
- Configuration
  - Whyte: 0-6-0
  - UIC: Cn
- Gauge: 4 ft 8 1/2 in (1,435 mm) standard gauge
- Driver dia.: 5 ft 0 in (1.524 m)
- Length: 56 ft 2 in (17.12 m)
- Width: 8 ft 8 in (2.64 m)
- Height: 12 ft 11 in (3.94 m)
- Loco weight: 45.65 long tons (46.38 t; 51.13 short tons)
- Fuel capacity: 4 long tons (4.1 t; 4.5 short tons)
- Water cap.: 3,000 imp gal (14,000 L; 3,600 US gal)
- Boiler pressure: 160 psi (1,100 kPa)
- Superheater: None
- Cylinders: Two, inside
- Cylinder size: 18.5 in × 26 in (470 mm × 660 mm)
- Valve gear: Stephenson
- Valve type: Slide valves
- Loco brake: Air brake
Performance figures
- Tractive effort: 20,170 lbf (89.7 kN)
Career
- Operators: Caledonian Railway; London, Midland and Scottish Railway; British Railways
- Class: CR: 812 and 652
- Power class: LMS/BR: 3F
- Number in class: 79 (812) 17 (652)
- Numbers: CR: 282-293, 812-878 (812) 325-328, 652-659, 661-665 (652); LMS: 17550-17628 (812) 17629-17645 (652); BR: 57550-57628 (812) 57629-57645 (652)
- Locale: Scottish Region
- Withdrawn: 1946–1963
- Preserved: No. 828
- Disposition: One 812 preserved, remainder scrapped

The Caledonian Railway 812 and 652 Classes were 0-6-0 steam tender locomotives designed by John F. McIntosh, and introduced in 1899 for express-freight and mixed traffic on the Caledonian Railway. They had the same large boiler type as 721 “Dunalastair” Class 4-4-0s which operated at 160 psi, and were fitted with additional tubes, making it a prodigious raiser of steam. They could easily reach speeds of up to 55 mph (89 km/h).

== Construction ==
Since the design was considered a development of an existing one and the need for locomotives was urgent, the company commissioned production directly from the drawing board. The need was so great that some had to be built by external contractors.

96 locomotives were built, as follows:

Table of locomotives, 812 Class
| Year | Quantity | CR Nos. | Builder | Builders No. | LMS Nos. | BR Nos. | Notes |
|---|---|---|---|---|---|---|---|
| 1899 | 17 | 812–828 | CR, St. Rollox | Y054 | 17550–17566 | 57550–57566 | 828 preserved |
| 1899 | 10 | 829–838 | Neilson, Reid & Co. | 5613–5622 | 17567–17576 | 57568–57576 | 17567 withdrawn before nationalisation |
| 1900 | 10 | 839–848 | Neilson, Reid & Co. | 5623–5632 | 17577–17586 | 57577–57586 | |
| 1900 | 15 | 849–863 | Sharp Stewart | 4633–4647 | 17587–17601 | 57587–57597, 57599–57601 | 17598 withdrawn before nationalisation |
| c.1900 | 15 | 864–878 | Dübs & Co. | 3880–3894 | 17602–17616 | 57602–57609, 57611–57616 | 17610 withdrawn before nationalisation |
| 1899 | 12 | 282–293 | CR, St. Rollox | Y058 | 17617–17628 | 57617–57628 | |

Subsequently, between 1908 and 1909, another batch of 17 locomotives was built with the same basic specifications, although with minor differences in the cab, reinforced frames, and the replacement of the old coil springs with laminated springs on the driving axle. These locomotives were designated the "652" class. It is worth noting that the Belgian State Railways copied the "812" design.

Table of locomotives, 652 Class
| Year | Quantity | CR Nos. | Builder | Builders No. | LMS Nos. | BR Nos. | Notes |
|---|---|---|---|---|---|---|---|
| 1908 | 8 | 652–659 | CR, St. Rollox | Y087-Y086 | 17629–17636 | 57629–57636 | |
| 1908 | 4 | 662–665 | CR, St. Rollox | Y086 | 17637–17640 | 57637–57640 | |
| 1909 | 4 | 325–328 | CR, St. Rollox | Y086 | 17641–17644 | 57641–57644 | |
| 1909 | 1 | 661 | CR, St. Rollox | Y086 | 17645 | 57645 | |

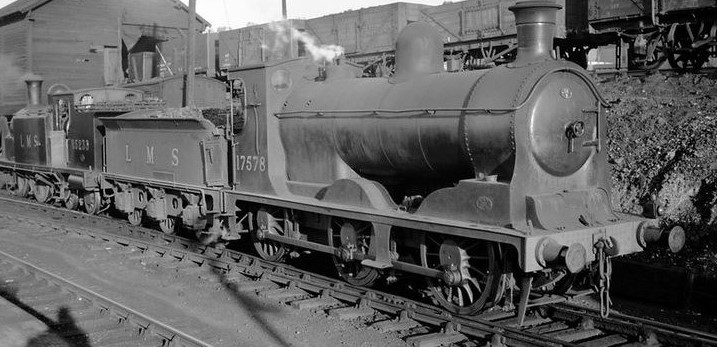
EX-CR Class 812. LMS Nos.17578

As built, seventeen were fitted with the Westinghouse air brakes for passenger train working: were turned out in Caledonian blue livery, while the rest of the class was lined black, while there were minor changes in appearance with the original safety valves being replaced, some receiving a flatter dome and others being fitted with an LMS-pattern boiler. As built all had 3,000 gallon six-wheel tenders but during the 1940s some were given 3,570 gallon versions from scrapped 4-4-0s, with the originals being cascaded to older ‘294’ class engines. All 96 locomotives passed to the London, Midland and Scottish Railway at the 1923 grouping: All engines were painted unlined black and remained so for the rest of their lives. The air brake equipment was removed in LMS days and instead some engines were fitted with vacuum brakes.

== Operations ==
Initial passenger duties included boat trains to Gourock and Wemyss Bay from Glasgow Central, with this work lasting until 1906, while some also worked turns around Perth and Dundee. Most of the others were employed on medium to long-distance freight trains with the class predominant on coal trains originating from the Lanarkshire coalfields. Some engines were also employed on fast fish trains and this led to examples being equipped with vacuum ejectors and through pipes to enable them to work fitted freight trains.

There was very little change in the work performed by the ‘812s’ under the Caledonian Railway but following the 1923 Grouping and later nationalisation, these engines began to operate in a wider area, with many being used on the Glasgow and South Western section as well as the wider area lines, but the class could be found in many locations in Scotland prior to their eventual withdrawal.

The class remained intact until 1946 when 17598 and 17610 were taken out of service and they were joined by 17567 the following year because this had been damaged in an accident at Leith . The remaining 76 survived into British Railways ownership and were renumbered by replacing the 17000 series numbers with 57000 series. There were three more withdrawals in 1947 and two more in 1949 with only a handful more until 1959 when five more were taken out of service. The biggest number withdrawn in any one year was 27 in 1962 and the class was rendered extinct in 1963 when the last 10 were laid aside. By this time every engine in the class had achieved more than one million miles in service with the top mileage recorded being of first-built 812, which had amassed 1,574,248 miles.

== Preservation ==
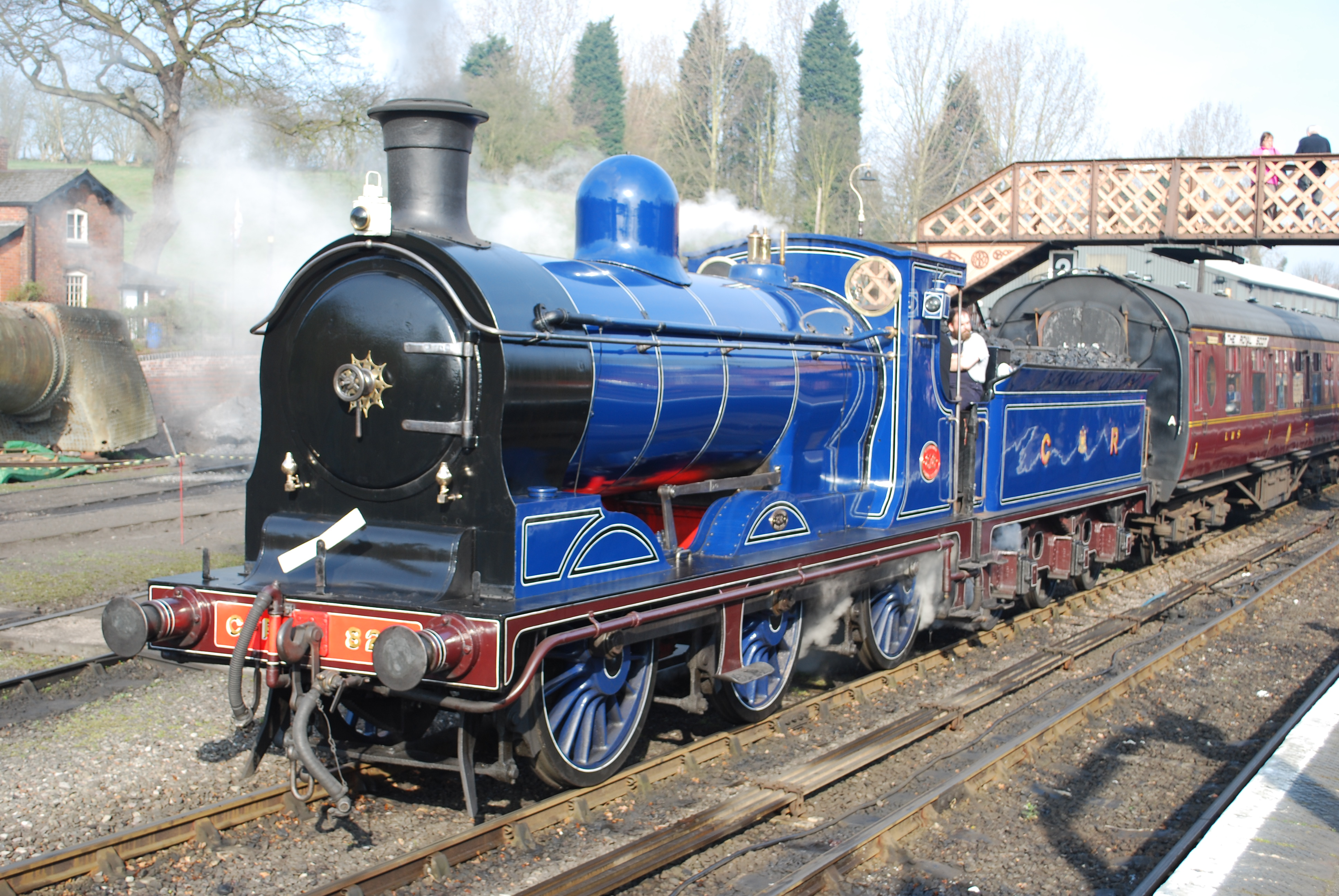
Locomotive 828 on the Severn Valley Railway, 25 March 2012

Fortunately the Caledonian Railway Trust identified the ‘812’ as one of the classes that should be preserved and it was successful. CR No. 828 (LMS 17566, BR 57566) is the sole survivor of the class and is an important example of Scottish industrial heritage. It is based at the Strathspey Railway. It was returned to regular service in 2010 and then again in March 2017 following heavy repairs. 828 is the final member of the first batch of engines built in 1899. Since 2022 it has been on long term hire to the Spa Valley Railway in Kent. where it joined fellow Caledonian survivor 419 during the Scottish Steam Up over Easter 2022.

== Belgian derivatives ==
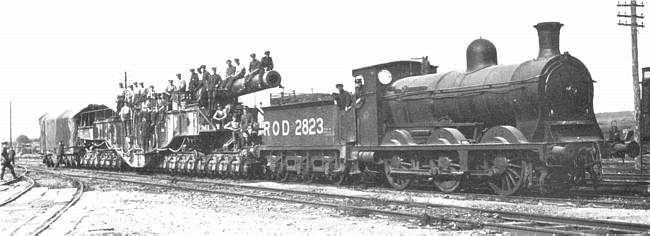
A Type 30 engine used by the Railway Operating Division

Belgian State Railways (SNCB-NMBS) derived three series of steam locomotives (891 units) from the class 812 between 1899 and 1914. They had a shallower firebox, able to burn semi-bituminous coal and briquettes, allowing a shorter wheelbase due to its positioning above the rear axle. There were three classes:

- Type 30 – first variant with several details in common with the Caledonian engines (cab windows, gauges, and tender coupling). 82 built between 1899 and 1901.
- Type 32 (later renamed Type 44) – more powerful and fitted with a Belgian cab, higher steam pressure, new gauges and tender coupling. 502 built between 1901 and 1910.
- Type 32S (later renamed Type 41) – same features but improved with a Schmidt superheater. 307 built between 1905 and 1914.

Until 1909, they were the only new engines used with freight trains. They were also used on suburban and local passenger trains and some expresses on hilly sections. Most of them were retired between 1947 and 1959. Some of them were then used as stationary boilers and two of them (44.225 and 41.195) survive in museums. A third one (44.021) was kept as a parts donor and scrapped in 2002.

== Models ==
Rails of Sheffield announced at the opening of Model Rail Scotland on 23 February 2018, that in conjunction with Bachmann Europe Plc they have reached agreement with The Caledonian Railway 828 Trust to produce OO scale models of the 812 Class 0-6-0 locomotives. Bachmann's American branch through their Thomas & Friends line offers models of Donald and Douglas in HO/OO scale, a pair of fictional 812 class locomotives that originated in The Railway Series.

== See also ==
- Locomotives of the Caledonian Railway
