= Caledonian Railway 179 and 184 Classes =

4-6-0 mixed-traffic locomotives

Type and origin
- Power type: Steam
- Designer: John F. McIntosh
- Builder: St. Rollox
- Build date: 1913-15
- Total produced: 11
Specifications
- Configuration
  - Whyte: 4-6-0
- Gauge: 4 ft 8 1/2 in (1,435 mm)
- Driver dia.: 5 ft 9 in (1.75 m)
- Loco weight: 68.5 long tons (69.6 t; 76.7 short tons)
- Tender weight: 38 long tons (39 t; 43 short tons)
- Water cap.: 3,570 imp gal (16,200 L; 4,290 US gal)
- Boiler pressure: 170 psi (1,200 kPa)
- Superheater: Robinson
- Cylinders: Two, inside
- Cylinder size: 19.5 in × 26 in (495 mm × 660 mm)
- Valve gear: Stephenson
Performance figures
- Tractive effort: 20,700 lbf (92 kN)
Career
- Operators: CR • LMS
- Class: CR: 179 and 184
- Power class: LMS: 3F
- Number in class: 11
- Numbers: CR: 179-189
- Withdrawn: 1934–1937, 1945, 1946
- Disposition: All scrapped

The Caledonian Railway 179 Class and 184 Class were 4-6-0 mixed-traffic locomotives designed by John F. McIntosh and built in two batches in 1913–14 and 1914–15 respectively, at the Caledonian Railway's own St. Rollox Works. The differences between the two batches were minor, and they are often considered to be a single class.

== Overview ==
They were the last new locomotives designed by McIntosh before his retirement. The type was essentially a superheated version of the earlier 908 Class and were built primarily for use on express goods trains, although they also worked on passenger traffic and were painted in the Caledonian's blue passenger livery. The locomotives were the most successful of McIntosh's various 4-6-0 designs.

== LMS ownership ==
The locomotives passed into the ownership of the London, Midland and Scottish Railway upon its formation in 1923. Although the older 908 Class were treated as passenger locomotives by the LMS, the 179s were classified as a freight type and were repainted into unlined black freight livery. They continued in use until they were displaced by new LMS standard locomotives such as the Black Five 4-6-0s.

== Disposal ==
9 of the class were withdrawn and scrapped between 1934 and 1937, with the last to going in 1945 and 1946 respectively.

== Numbering and locomotive histories ==
| CR no. | LMS no. | Delivered | Works | Withdrawn | Class |
|---|---|---|---|---|---|
| 179 | 17905 | Dec 1913 | St. Rollox | Dec 1945 | 179 Class |
| 180 | 17906 | Dec 1913 | St. Rollox | Feb 1936 | 179 Class |
| 181 | 17907 | Jan 1914 | St. Rollox | Nov 1935 | 179 Class |
| 182 | 17908 | Jan 1914 | St. Rollox | Feb 1946 | 179 Class |
| 183 | 17909 | Feb 1914 | St. Rollox | Nov 1936 | 179 Class |
| 184 | 17910 | Dec 1914 | St. Rollox | Sep 1936 | 184 Class |
| 185 | 17911 | Dec 1914 | St. Rollox | Apr 1935 | 184 Class |
| 186 | 17912 | Jan 1915 | St. Rollox | Jun 1937 | 184 Class |
| 187 | 17913 | Feb 1915 | St. Rollox | Nov 1934 | 184 Class |
| 188 | 17914 | Feb 1915 | St. Rollox | Jun 1935 | 184 Class |
| 189 | 17915 | Feb 1915 | St. Rollox | Mar 1935 | 184 Class |

source: BritishSteam

== See also ==
- Locomotives of the Caledonian Railway
