= Caledonian Railway 492 Class =

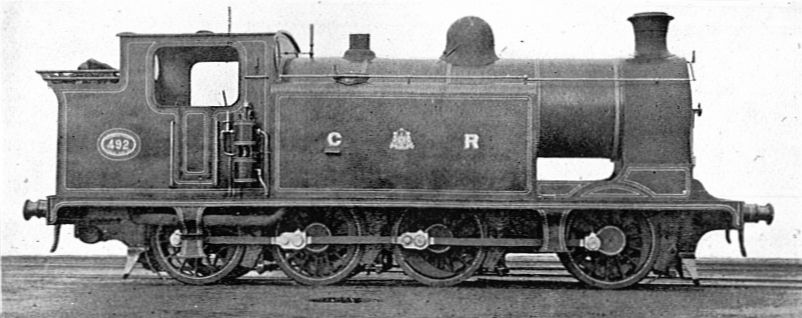
Type and origin
- Power type: Steam
- Designer: John F. McIntosh
- Builder: CR St. Rollox Works
- Order number: Y71
- Build date: 1903-1904
- Total produced: 6
Specifications
- Configuration
  - Whyte: 0-8-0T
- Gauge: 4 ft 8 1/2 in (1,435 mm) standard gauge
- Driver dia.: 4 ft 6 in (1.37 m)
- Length
  - Over buffers: 34 ft 3 in (10.44 m)
- Water cap.: 1,500 imp gal (1,800 US gal; 6.8 kL)
- Boiler pressure: 175 psi (12.1 bar)
- Cylinders: Two, inside
- Cylinder size: 19 in × 26 in (483 mm × 660 mm)
- Valve gear: Stephenson
- Valve type: Slide valves
- Loco brake: Westinghouse air brake
Performance figures
- Tractive effort: 22,813 lbf (101.48 kN)
Career
- Operators: Caledonian Railway; London, Midland and Scottish Railway
- Class: CR: 492
- Number in class: 6
- Numbers: CR: 492-497; LMS: 16500-16505; LMS (1926): 16950-16955
- Withdrawn: 1932-1939
- Disposition: All scrapped

The Caledonian Railway 492 Class were a class of six 0-8-0 tank engines that were built for the Caledonian Railway, in Scotland by St. Rollox Works from November 1903 to January 1904.

These engines were described as mineral engines with large cabs with doors fitted. The 2nd axle had flangeless wheels. All members survived into LMS ownership.

== History ==
Three locomotives, numbers 16950, 16952 and 16955, were allocated to Motherwell sheds during the days of the LMS, where the last of these were withdrawn in 1939. Another locomotive served as a banker for goods trains between Ninewells Junction, and Fairmuir and Maryfield yards, stationed at Dundee.

== Numbering ==
Table of locomotives
CR no.	LMS no.	LMS (1926) no.	Delivered	Withdrawn
492	16500	16950	1903	1936
493	16501	16951	1903	1932
494	16502	16952	1903	1936
495	16503	16953	1903	1935
496	16504	16954	1904	1932
497	16505	16955	1904	1939
