= Caledonian Railway 721 Class =

Class of 4-4-0 steam locomotives

Caledonian Railway 721 Class "Dunalastair" For variations see Table 1 below
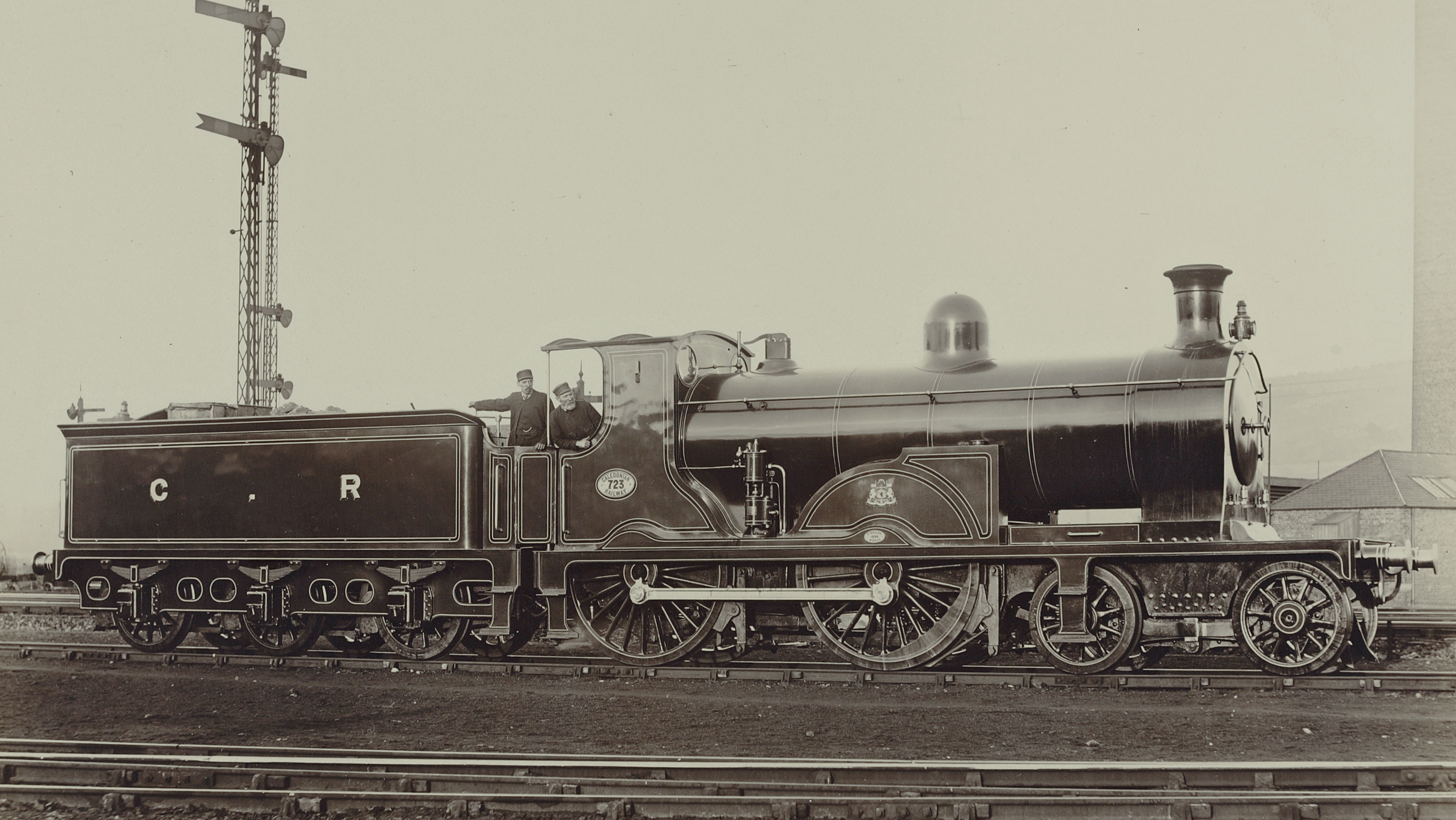
Type and origin
- Power type: Steam
- Designer: John F. McIntosh
- Builder: St. Rollox Works
- Build date: 1896
- Total produced: 15
Specifications
- Configuration
  - Whyte: 4-4-0
- Gauge: 4 ft 8 1/2 in (1,435 mm)
- Driver dia.: 6 ft 6 in (1.98 m)
- Loco weight: 47 long tons (48 t)
- Fuel type: coal
- Water cap.: 4,125 imp gal (18,750 L; 4,954 US gal)
- Boiler pressure: 160 psi (1,100 kPa)
- Cylinders: Two, inside
- Cylinder size: 18.25 in × 26 in (464 mm × 660 mm)
- Valve gear: Stephenson
- Valve type: Slide valves
Performance figures
- Tractive effort: 15,100 lbf (67 kN)
Career
- Operators: CR • LMS • British Railways
- Class: CR: 721
- Power class: LMS: 2P
- Withdrawn: 1930–1958
- Disposition: All scrapped

The Caledonian Railway 721 Class (known as the "Dunalastair" class) was a class of 4-4-0 steam locomotives designed by John F. McIntosh for the Caledonian Railway (CR) and introduced in 1896. Taking their name from the estate in Perthshire owned by the Caledonian's then deputy chairman, J.C.Bunten, all survived to be absorbed by the London, Midland and Scottish Railway (LMS) in 1923 and a few survived into British Railways (BR) ownership in 1948.

== Development ==
The "Dunalastair" class marked a new era of development in late-Victorian British steam locomotive design. The average weight of passenger trains had greatly increased in the 1880s and 1890s due to the demand for more comfortable, better-appointed and safer carriages. Combined with continually rising passenger volumes and the competition between railway companies to offer faster services and locomotive engineers were faced with producing engines that could operate longer, heavier trains at faster speeds. The existing pattern of inside-cylinder 4-4-0 express engine was reaching the limits of its development and many railways were resorting to the inefficient practice of double heading to maintain schedules.

McIntosh provided the solution with the original "Dunalastair" of 1896. In broad design this was identical to the conventional 4-4-0 engine drawn up by his predecessor Dugald Drummond, but it carried a boiler significantly larger than was usual for the time - almost to the full limits that the Caledonian's loading gauge would allow, operating at a relatively high pressure of 160 psi (1,103 kPa). The boiler also contained more fire tubes of a greater diameter than its predecessors, greatly increasing its steam generating capacity and overall steam volume.

While the top speed of the 721 Class and its developments was largely the same as other express 4-4-0s the more productive and capacious boiler meant the type offered a hugely improved ability to maintain high speeds with heavy loads on steep gradients, allowing the "Dunalastairs" to set high average speeds over the Caledonian's arduous main line over Beattock Summit. So confident was McIntosh that his new engine would do away with the need for double heading that the "Dunalastairs" were originally built without brake hoses on their front buffer beam, meaning that a second engine could not be coupled to them.

The principles of the 721 Class and its boiler were adopted by many other locomotive engineers and railways in the 1890s and early 20th century, leading to the so-called 'big engine' period of design. Other engine classes such as the GNR Class C1 and the GWR 4100 Class were inspired by the success of the "Dunalastairs".

The class was very successful and developed in four different versions:

- Dunalastair I (721 Class) built 1896
- Dunalastair II (766 Class) built 1897 (some rebuilt with superheaters 1914)
- Dunalastair III (900 Class) built 1899–1900 (some rebuilt with superheaters 1914–18)
- Dunalastair IV (140 Class) built 1904–10 (some rebuilt with superheaters 1915–17)

The rebuilding with superheaters was accompanied by a reduction in boiler pressure and an increase in cylinder diameter.

There are two further classes of McIntosh 4-4-0 locomotives which some authors have included in the Dunalastair series. These are:

- 139 Class, built 1910–12 with Schmidt superheaters
- 43 Class, built 1913–14 with Robinson superheaters

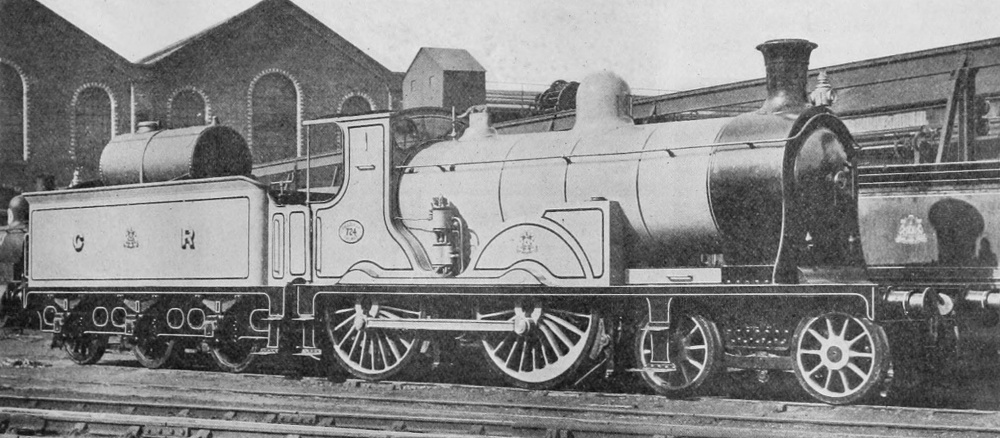
Dunalastair I No. 724 with Holden oil burners

During the national coal strike of 1912, some Caledonian locomotives, including Dunalastairs or 139 class engines, and two engines from class 812 were fitted with Holden oil burners for a short time. They received a 520 imperial gallons (2,400 L) fuel tank atop the tender and more refractory bricks in the firebox.

=== Tenders ===
Classes 766 and 900 were built with eight-wheel bogie tenders with capacities for 4,125 imperial gallons (18,750 L) of water and 4.5 tons of coal. In the 1930s newer and more powerful LMS locomotives took over their most long-distance duties and the company cascaded the 900 Class to other work. This made eight-wheel tenders superfluous so the company substituted smaller, lighter and simpler six-wheel tenders from scrapped Caledonian locomotives. Most members of the class received McIntosh tenders that had been built for classes 179, 600, 908 and 918. The six-wheel tenders had the same 4.5 ton coal capacity but carried only 3,570 imperial gallons (16,200 L) of water.

=== Names ===
The Caledonian named only a handful of locomotives, eleven in total, five of which were Dunalastairs:

- Dunalastair I (721 Class) 721 Dunalastair, 723 Victoria, 724 Jubilee
- Dunalastair II (766 Class) 766 Dunalastair 2nd/II*, 779 Breadalbane

No. 766 was the first of the "second class of Dunalastairs". It took the name Dunalastair 2nd but this was likely very short-lived, perhaps only between May and June 1898. Beyond this, it appears to have simply worn the name Dunalastair and seemingly never wore the Roman 'II' as is often quoted. What is certain is the name was removed completely before 1914.

== Accidents and incidents ==
- On 22 May 1915 three of these locomotives, no. 121 of the 139 Class, no. 140 of the Dunalastair IV Class and no. 48 of the 43 Class, were involved in the Quintinshill rail disaster. A down local train from Carlisle (hauled by no. 907, a 4-6-0 of the 903 Class) had been crossed from the down line to the up line in order to allow a late-running down express from London Euston to pass it. An up troop train from Larbert, hauled by no. 121, was incorrectly given clear signals and collided with the stationary local train, and the express from London, double-headed by nos. 140 and 48, then collided with the wreckage of the first collision. One of them, no. 121 was damaged beyond repair by the impact and scrapped whilst the other two were repaired.
- On 25 October 1928, locomotive No. 14435 was one of two hauling an express passenger train that was in a rear-end collision at 60 miles per hour (97 km/h) with a freight train at Dinwoodie, Dumfriesshire due to errors by the guard of the freight train and the Dinwoodie signalman. Four enginemen were killed and five people were injured.

== Dimensions ==
Table 1
Class	Weight	Boiler pressure	Cylinders	Driving wheels	Tractive effort	LMS power class
Dunalastair I	47 tons	160 psi	18.25" × 26"	6' 6"	15,100 lbf	2P
Dunalastair II	49 tons	175 psi	19" × 26"	6' 6"	17,900 lbf	2P
Dunalastair III	51.7 tons	180 psi	19" × 26"	6' 6"	18,411 lbf	2P
Dunalastair IV	56.5 tons	180 psi	19" × 26"	6' 6"	18,411 lbf	2P
Rebuilt II	52 tons	170 psi	19.5" × 26"	6' 6"	18,315 lbf	3P
Rebuilt III	54.5 tons	170 psi	19.5" × 26"	6' 6"	18,315 lbf	3P
Rebuilt IV	56.5 tons	170 psi	20.25" × 26"	6' 6"	19,751 lbf	3P
139 and 43	59 tons	170 psi	20.25" × 26"	6' 6"	19,751 lbf	3P

== Numbering ==
Table 2
Class	CR no.	LMS no.	BR no. (Note: BR renumbered the engines by adding 40000 to the LMS numbers. The BR number series are not continuous because some engines were withdrawn before 1948.)	Withdrawal dates
Dunalastair I	721–735	14311–14325	–	1930–35
Dunalastair II	766–780	14326–14336	–	1936–47
Dunalastair III	900–902, 887–899	14337–14348	–	1932–47
Dunalastair IV	140–150, 923–927, 137, 138, 136	14349–14365	54363	1937–48
Rebuilt II	766, 769, 771, 772	14430–14433	–	1935–37
Rebuilt III	894, 900, 901, 898	14434–14437	54434	1928–48
Rebuilt IV	923, 924	14438–14439	54438–54439	1955–58
139 Class	139, 132–135, 117–122	14440–14449	54440–54449	1915–57 (Note: CR number 121 was withdrawn in 1915 after the Quintinshill disaster so did not receive an LMS number.)
43 Class	43–48, 39–42, 123	14450–14460	54450–54460	1954–57

The 139 Class and 43 Class are included in the Dunalastair series by some authors. Some locomotives survived into British Railways (BR) ownership in 1948.

== Belgian derivatives ==
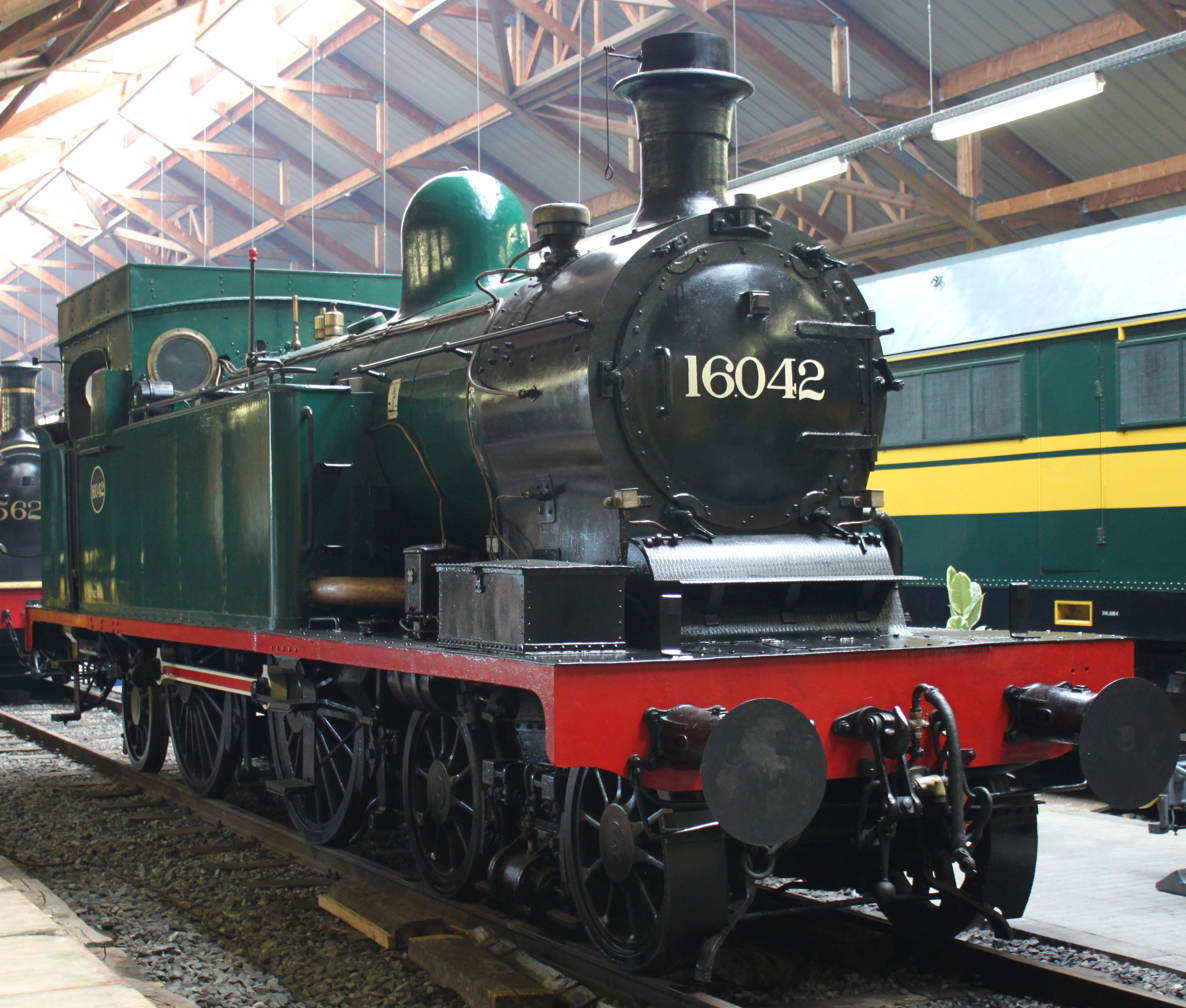
SNCB-NMBS Class 16

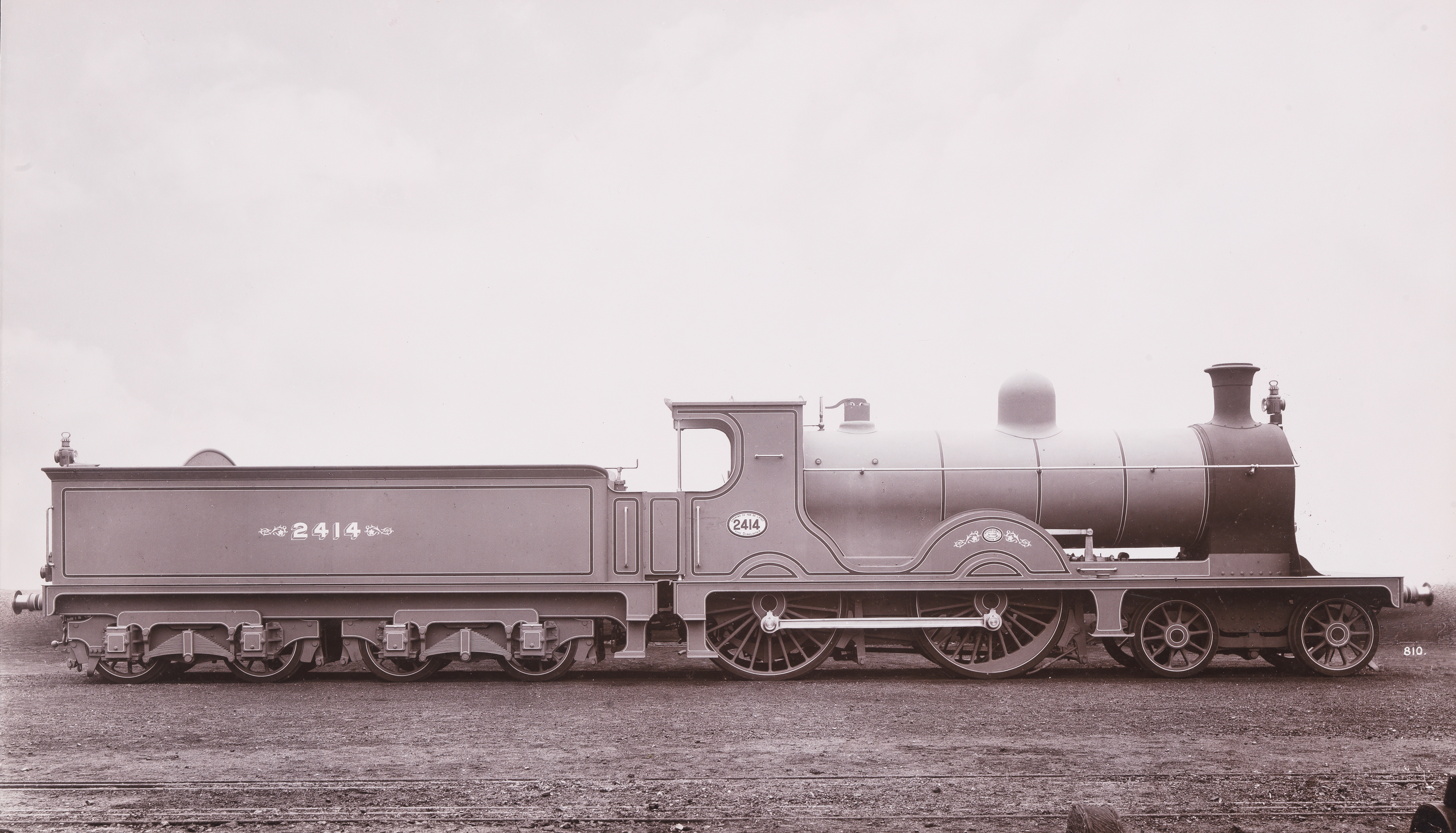
SNCB-NMBS Type 17 No. 2414, built by Neilson Reid

The Belgian State Railways (SNCB-NMBS) derived six series of steam locomotives (424 units) from the Dunalastair design between 1899 and 1913:

- Type 17 – regular 4-4-0 Dunalastair III design: driving wheel 1.98 m, 52.5 tons (built 1899–1901, 95 units, including five supplied by Neilson Reid)
- Type 18 – more powerful than Type 17: 53.3 tons (built 1902–05, 128 units)
- Type 19 – (initially Type 18S): superheated version of type 18: 57.8 tons (built 1905, 6 units)
- Type 20 – (initially Type 18bis): upgraded (superheated and more powerful) type 18: 60.0 tons (15 units)
- Type 14 – (initially Type 15bis): 4-4-2T tank locomotive based on Dunalastair III design: driving wheel 1.8 m, 62.0 tons, deep firebox (built 1900–01, 49 units)
- Type 15 – same as Type 14, but with mid-deep firebox: 64.0 tons (built 1900–08, 73 units)
- Type 16 – (initially Type 15S) superheated version of Type 15 with mid-deep firebox : 69.4 tons (built 1905–13, 78 units)

Two of them are preserved in cosmetic state by SNCB: 4-4-2 tank locomotive 16.042 and express locomotive 18.051.

18.051 also features an eight-wheel bogie tender similar to the Caledonian eight-wheel tender. This kind of tender was used on Type 17 and some of the first Type 18 while the rest (including 18.051) had wider and larger six-wheel Belgian tenders. That one was salvaged when 18.051 was restored and was originally built for an older Type 18.

== Withdrawal ==
The original Dunalastair (721 Class) locomotives were withdrawn between 1930 and 1935. The Dunalastair II (766 Class) were withdrawn between 1936 and 1947, but the four rebuilt with superheater went earlier, in 1935–36. The Dunalastair III (900 Class) were mostly withdrawn between 1937 and 1948, although two had been scrapped in 1928 and 1932. No. 14434 was the only Rebuilt Dunalastair III' to survive into British Railways ownership. The non-superheater Dunalastair IV (140 Class) were withdrawn between 1937 and 1948, with No. 14363 being the only non-superheated Dunalastair IV to be inherited by British Railways. Meanwhile, the two Rebuilt Dunalastair IVs, Nos. 14438 and 14439, also both survived into British Railways days, receiving the numbers 54438 and 54439. No. 54438 was withdrawn from Dumfries on 20 May 1955, with No. 54439 being withdrawn from Wick on 18 August 1958. Those built (or rebuilt) with superheater and piston valves (139 and 43 Classes) lasted longer, mostly being withdrawn between 1952 and 1959, although two were withdrawn in 1915 and 1946.

== See also ==
- Locomotives of the Caledonian Railway

== Sources and further reading ==
- Allen, Cecil J, ed. (1948). The ABC of British Locomotives. Vol. 3, 40000–59999 Steam Locomotives: London Midland Region Scottish (ex. LMS) Region. London: Ian Allan.
- Baxter, Bertram (1984). Baxter, David (ed.). British Locomotive Catalogue 1825–1923. Vol. 4: Scottish and remaining English Companies in the LMS Group. Ashbourne: Moorland Publishing. pp. 85–87.
- Casserley, HC; Johnston, SW (1966). Locomotives at the Grouping. Vol. 3: London Midland and Scottish. London: Ian Allan. pp. 138–144.
- Cornwell, HJ Campbell (1974). Forty Years of Caledonian Locomotives, 1882–1922. Newton Abbott: David & Charles. ISBN 0-715365339.
- Dunbar, AG; Reed, B (1973). Caledonian 4-4-0s. Locomotive Profiles. Vol. 34. Windsor: Profile Publications.
- Earnshaw, Alan (1991). Trains in Trouble. Vol. 7. Penryn: Atlantic Books. p. 21. ISBN 0-906899-50-8.
- Ellis, Hamilton (1959). British Railway History. Vol. 2. London: George Allan & Unwin.
- Essery, R; Jenkinson, D (1986). LMS Group Locomotives. Vol. 3: Absorbed Pre-Group Classes, Northern Division. Poole: Oxford Publishing Co. ISBN 0-860932664.
- MacLeod, AB (1948) [1944]. The McIntosh locomotives of the Caledonian Railway, 1895–1914. Famous Locomotive Types. London: Ian Allan.
- Nock, OS (1968). The Caledonian Dunalastairs and Associated Classes. Newton Abbott: David & Charles. ISBN 0-715342517.
- Nock, OS; Cooper, BK (1992) [1966]. Historic Railway Disasters (4th ed.). London: Book Club Associates. pp. 88–90, 92. ISBN 0-711017522. CN 6843.
