= Caledonian Railway 294 and 711 Classes =

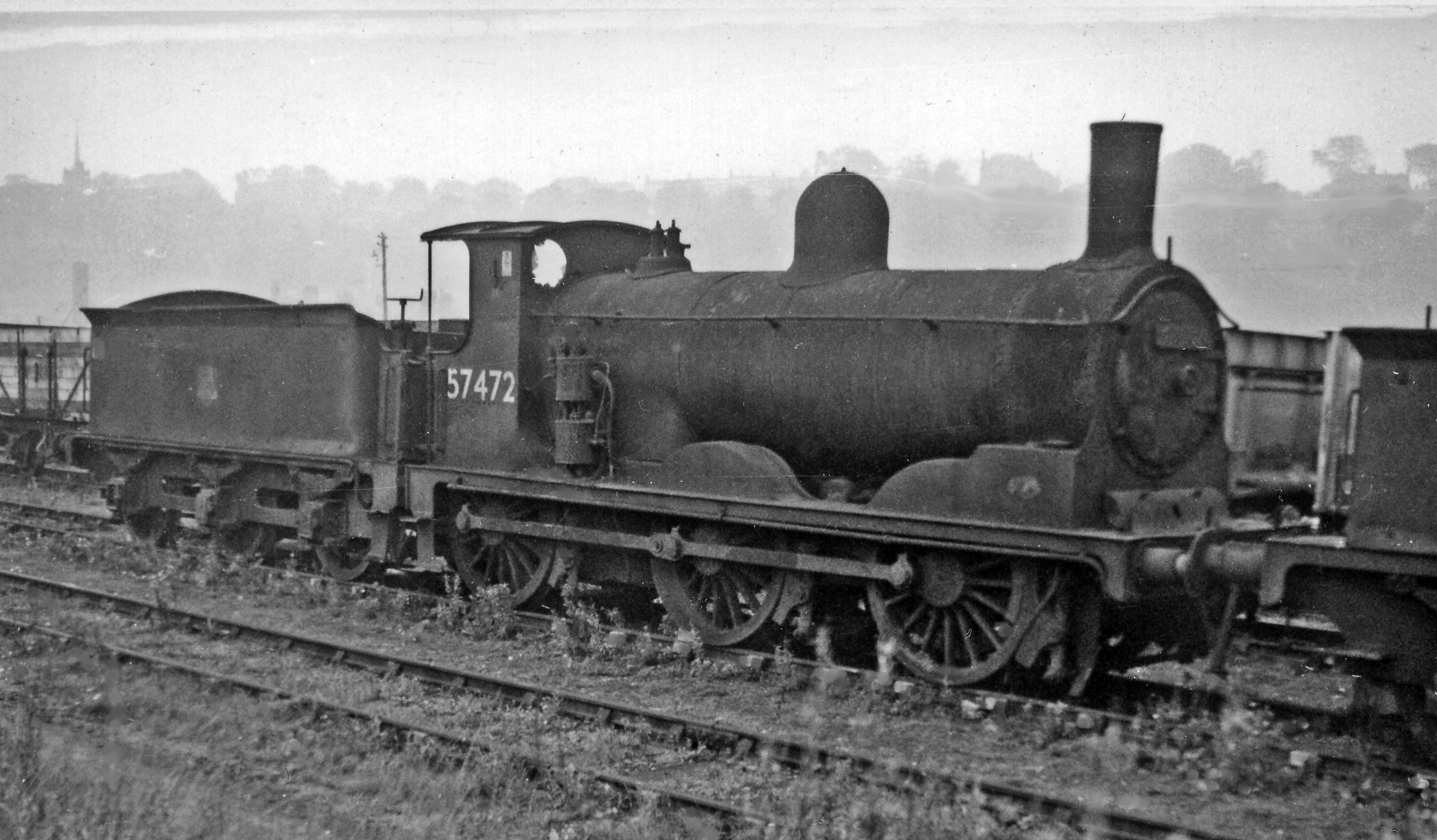
- 711 class No. 57472 at Bo'ness 4 October 1961
Type and origin
- Power type: Steam
- Designer: Dugald Drummond
- Build date: 1883-1897
- Total produced: 244
Specifications
- Configuration
  - Whyte: 0-6-0
- Gauge: 4 ft 8 1/2 in (1,435 mm)
- Driver dia.: 5 ft 0 in (1.52 m)
- Loco weight: 41.3 long tons (42.0 t)
- Fuel type: coal
- Boiler pressure: 150 psi (1,000 kPa)
- Cylinders: Two, inside
- Cylinder size: 18 in × 26 in (457 mm × 660 mm)
- Valve gear: Stephenson
Performance figures
- Tractive effort: 17,901 lbf (79.63 kN)
Career
- Operators: Caledonian Railway; London, Midland and Scottish Railway; British Railways
- Class: CR: 294 and 711
- Power class: LMS: 2F
- Numbers: LMS:17230-17392 (294) 17393-17473 (711); BR:57230-57392 (294) 57393-57473 (711)
- Nicknames: Jumbo
- Locale: Scottish Region
- Withdrawn: 1946-1962
- Disposition: All scrapped

The Caledonian Railway 294 and 711 Classes (nicknamed "Jumbo") were 0-6-0 steam locomotives designed by Dugald Drummond for the Caledonian Railway (CR) and introduced in 1883. After Drummond's retirement, construction of the class continued under Smellie, Lambie and McIntosh.

== Ownership changes ==
All 244 locomotives survived to be absorbed by the London, Midland and Scottish Railway (LMS) in 1923 and 238 survived into British Railways (BR) ownership in 1948.

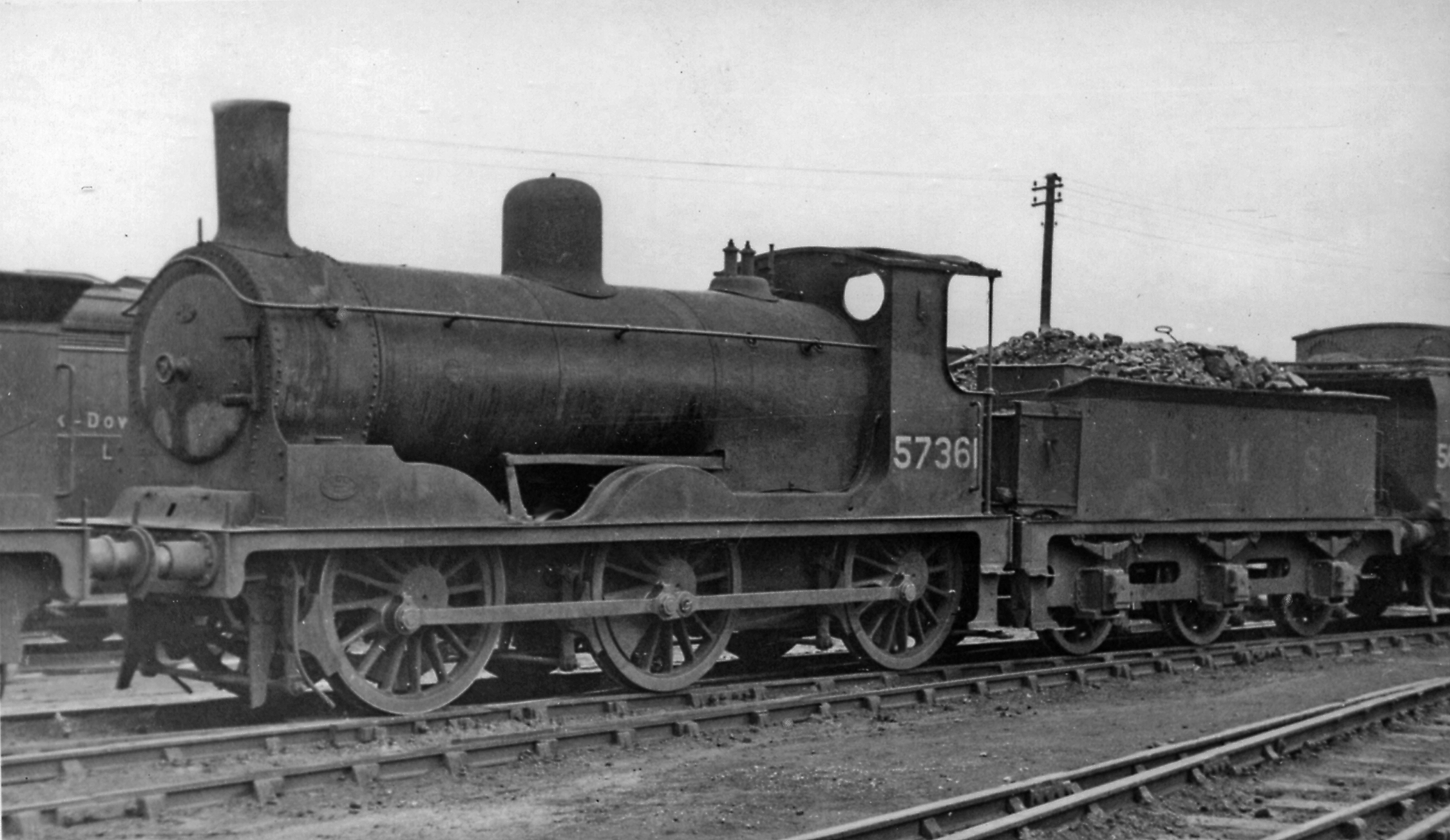
294 class No. 57361 at Polmadie Depot 15 August 1948

== Numbering ==
294 Class

| CR nos. | LMS nos. | BR nos. |
|---|---|---|
| Various | 17230–17392 | 57230–57392 |

711 Class

| CR nos. | LMS nos. | BR nos. |
|---|---|---|
| Various | 17393–17473 | 57393–57473 |

The BR number series are not continuous because some locomotives were withdrawn before 1948.

== See also ==
- Locomotives of the Caledonian Railway
