= John F. McIntosh =

Scottish engineer

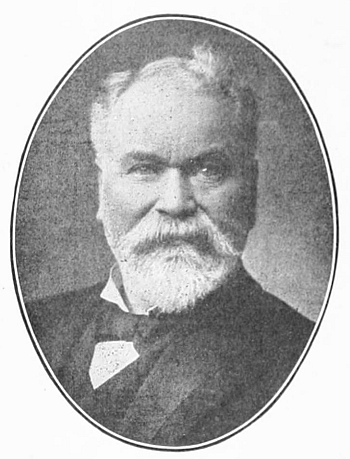
- Born: John Farquharson MacIntosh; 28 February 1846; Haugh of Kinnaird; Farnell, Angus
- Died: 6 February 1918 (aged 71); Springburn, Glasgow, Scotland
- Spouse: Jeanie Fleming Logan
- Children: 3 sons 4 daughters
- Engineering career
- Discipline: Mechanical engineering

John Farquharson McIntosh (1846-1918) was a Scottish engineer. He was Chief Mechanical Engineer of the Caledonian Railway from 1895 to 1914. He was succeeded by William Pickersgill.

== Early life ==
Born in Farnell, Angus, Scotland, in February 1846, McIntosh would be famous for working at St. Rollox railway works, in Springburn, in Glasgow.

== Career ==
John F. McIntosh became an apprentice with the Scottish North Eastern Railway, at the Arbroath workshops, at the age of 14. In 1865 he passed out as a fireman and in 1867 he qualified as a driver and moved to Montrose. By this time he was employed by the Caledonian Railway (CR) which had taken over the SNER in 1866. He lost his right hand in an accident in 1876 or 1877. At about the same time he became Locomotive Inspector for the northern section of the CR. He was later given responsibility for all locations north of Greenhill. By 1881 he was living in Perth. Several appointments followed – Locomotive Foreman at Aberdeen, Carstairs and Polmadie (Glasgow); Chief Inspector; Locomotive Running Superintendent and deputy to John Lambie. Lambie died suddenly on 1 February 1895 and McIntosh replaced him as Chief Mechanical Engineer.

== Locomotive designs ==
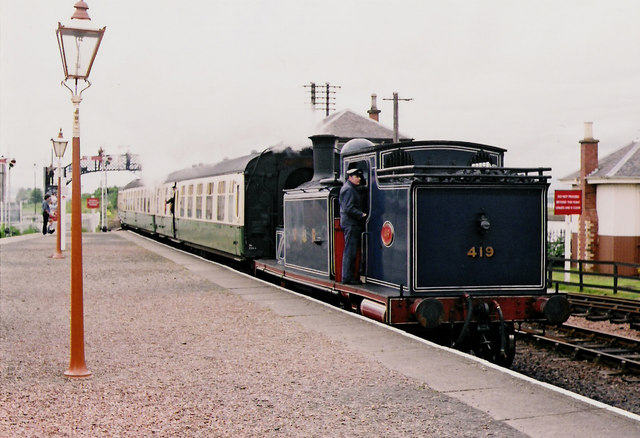
Preserved Caledonian Railway 439 Class number 419 in June 2005

McIntosh's most famous design is the Dunalastair Class 4-4-0. Other designs include:

- Caledonian Railway 19, 92 and 439 classes 0-4-4T (2P)
- Caledonian Railway 29 & 782 classes 0-6-0T (3F)
- Caledonian Railway 498 Class 0-6-0T (2F)
- Caledonian Railway 104 Class 0-4-4T (1P)
- Caledonian Railway 781 Class 0-4-0T
- Caledonian Railway 492 Class 0-8-0T (4F)
- Caledonian Railway 600 Class 0-8-0 (4F)
- Caledonian Railway 652 and 812 classes 0-6-0 (3F)
- Caledonian Railway 611 class 0-4-0T (0F)
- Caledonian Railway 711 Class 0-6-0
- Caledonian Railway Class 30 0-6-0
- Caledonian Railway Class 34 2-6-0 (3F)
- Caledonian Railway 721 Class 4-4-0 Dunalastair I
- Caledonian Railway 766 Class 4-4-0 Dunalastair II
- Caledonian Railway 900 Class 4-4-0 Dunalastair III
- Caledonian Railway 140 Class 4-4-0 Dunalastair IV
- Caledonian Railway 139 Class 4-4-0
- Caledonian Railway 43 Class 4-4-0
- Caledonian Railway 55 Class 4-6-0 (3P)
- Caledonian Railway 908 Class 4-6-0 (3P)
- Caledonian Railway 49 Class 4-6-0 (4P)
- Caledonian Railway 903 Class 4-6-0 (4P)
- Caledonian Railway 918 Class 4-6-0 (3F)
- Caledonian Railway 179 Class 4-6-0 (3F)
- Caledonian Railway 184 Class 4-6-0 (3F)

Preservation

Two McIntosh locomotives are preserved:

- 439 Class, number 419 at the Bo'ness and Kinneil Railway
- 812 Class, number 828 at the Strathspey Railway

== Patents ==
He obtained patents for a spark arrestor and a gauge glass protector.

List of patents

- GB189823849 (with Archibald St Clair Ruthven), published 31 May 1899, Improvements in or relating to railway wagon brakes
- GB190004019 (with Archibald St Clair Ruthven), published 16 February 1901, Improvements in or relating to railway wagon brakes
- GB190207009 (with John Riekie), published 22 April 1903, Improvements in and connected with engine valve gear
- GB190822998 (with Walter Reuben Preston), published 28 October 1909, Improvements in or relating to the smoke boxes of locomotive boilers

== Family ==
He married Jeanie Fleming Logan, a close relative to author Ian Fleming, and they had 3 sons and 4 daughters.

== Death ==
McIntosh died suddenly while working at St. Rollox railway works, on 6 February 1918, 22 days before his 72nd birthday. The cause of death was never confirmed.

== See also ==
- Locomotives of the Caledonian Railway
- Locomotives of the London, Midland and Scottish Railway

Business positions
Preceded by John Lambie	Chief Mechanical Engineer of the Caledonian Railway; 1895–1914	Succeeded by William Pickersgill
