= Belgian State Railways Type 30 =

Class of 82 Belgian 0-6-0 locomotives

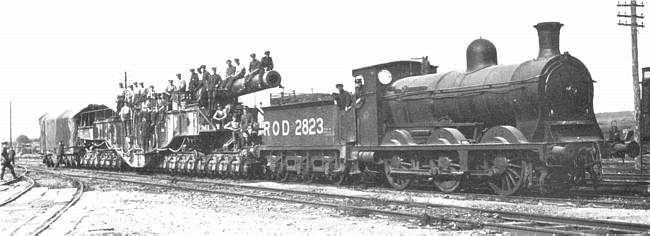
- Belgian Type 30 locomotive requisitioned by the Railway Operating Division in the First World War.
Type and origin
- Power type: Steam
- Build date: 1900–1901
- Total produced: 82
Specifications
- Configuration
  - Whyte: 0-6-0
  - UIC: C n2
- Gauge: 1,435 mm (4 ft 8 1/2 in)
- Driver dia.: 1,520 mm (4 ft 11 7/8 in)
- Wheelbase: 4.572 m (15 ft 0 in)
- Length: 9.209 m (30 ft 2 1/2 in)
- Loco weight: 46 t (101,000 lb)
- Firebox
  - Grate area: 2.5235 m^{2} (27.163 sq ft)
- Boiler pressure: 12 atm (1.22 MPa; 176 psi)
- Heating surface: 104.2948 m^{2} (1,122.620 sq ft)
- Cylinders: Two, inside
- Cylinder size: 457 mm × 660 mm (18.0 in × 26.0 in)
- Valve gear: Stephenson
Performance figures
- Tractive effort: 7,294 kg (16,081 lb)
Career
- Operators: Belgian State Railways
- Class: Type 30
- Numbers: État Belge: 2503–2514, 2823–2892
- Withdrawn: 1948
- Disposition: Most Scrapped

The Belgian State Railways Type 30 was a class of 0-6-0 steam locomotives for mixed service, introduced in 1900.

== Construction history ==
The locomotives were built by various manufacturers from 1900 to 1901. The machines had an inside frame with the cylinders and the Stephenson valve gear also located inside.

Production quantities
Manufacturer	Serial numbers	Quantity	Date in service	État Belge Numbers
Saint-Léonard	1190–1194	5	1900	EB 2503–2506, 2514
Haine-Saint-Pierre	638–644	7	1900	EB 2507–2513
Saint-Léonard	1270–1277	8	1901–1902	EB 2823–2830
Haine-Saint-Pierre	690–698	9	1901–1902	EB 2831–2839
Carels Frères	380–385	6	1901	EB 2840–2845
Zimmermann-Hanrez	582–585	4	1901	EB 2846–2849
Couillet	1320–1327	8	1901–1902	EB 2850–2857
Tubize	1275–1283	9	1901	EB 2858–2866
Franco-Belge	1349–1358	10	1901	EB 2867–2876
Cockerill	2322–2329	8	1901–1902	EB 2877–2884
Énergie (Marcinelle)	61–68	8	1901	EB 2885–2892

== Bibliography ==
- Tordeur, Emile (1909). Le Machiniste des Chemins de Fer Belges (in French).
- Dambly, Phil (Apr 1967). "Septième période, 1898-1908. - Régime Mac Intosh". Le Rail (in French). No. 128.
- Vandenberghen, J. (1988). Periode Mac Intosh 1898-1904 (in French). Bruxelles: SNCB.
- Dagant, André (1974). "Cent vingt-cinq ans de construction de locomotives à vapeur en Belgique". Bulletin de l'Institut archéologique liégeois (in French). 86. Liège: Maison Curtius: 23–244.
- Société de Saint-Léonard (1903). Catalogue de présentation - avec une planche par locomotive (PDF) (in French). Liège.
- Delporte, Luc (11 Jun 2019). "Locomotive à marchandises – Tubize type 72 (type 30 EB)". Musée 'de la Porte'.
