= Caledonian Railway 600 Class =

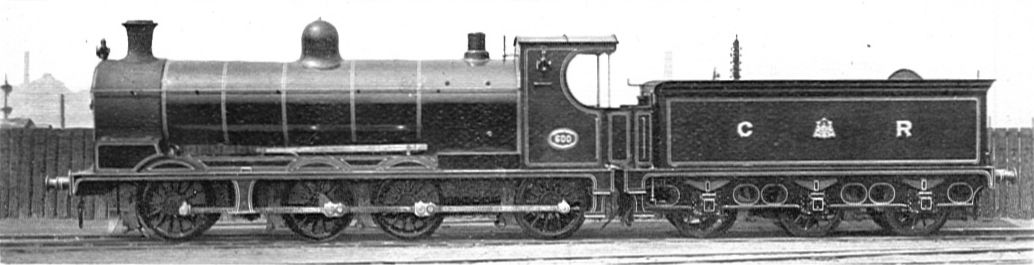
Type and origin
- Power type: Steam
- Designer: John F. McIntosh
- Build date: 1901-1903
- Total produced: 8
Specifications
- Configuration
  - Whyte: 0-8-0
- Gauge: 4 ft 8 1/2 in (1,435 mm)
- Coupled dia.: 4 ft 6 in (1.37 m)
- Boiler pressure: 175 psi (1,210 kPa; 12.1 bar)
- Cylinders: Two, inside
- Cylinder size: 21 in × 26 in (530 mm × 660 mm)
- Train brakes: Westinghouse
Career
- Operators: Caledonian Railway; London, Midland and Scottish Railway
- Numbers: 600-607
- Withdrawn: 1930
- Disposition: All scrapped

The Caledonian Railway 600 Class was a class of eight 0-8-0 steam locomotives, designed by John F. McIntosh for mineral traffic on the Caledonian Railway.

== History ==
In the early 1900s, the Caledonian Railway acquired about 2,400 30-ton bogie wagons fitted with Westinghouse air brakes. To handle the new rolling stock, John F. McIntosh designed an 0-8-0 locomotive design, also fitted with Westinghouse brakes to handle heavier loads.

Class leader, number 600, entered service in 1901, with the other seven followed within three years; all eight locomotives were outshopped in the black livery. In 1903, number 602 hauled 30 bogie wagons in a trial run from Perth to Motherwell. O.S. Nock stated that the 600 Class could handle 60 loaded bogie wagons.

The 600 Class worked mineral trains in the Lanarkshire and Ayrshire counties. Due to the lack of sidings capable of handling long trains, the haulage capacity was limited to 15 bogie wagons, compromising the effectiveness of the class. Niall Ferguson and David Stirling regarded the class as unsuccessful, with the last examples being withdrawn at the hands of the London, Midland and Scottish Railway in 1930.

== Bibliography ==
- Glen, A.E.; Glen, I.A.; Dunbar, A.G. (1979). Caledonian Cavalcade. London: Ian Allan Publishing. ISBN 0711009198 – via Internet Archive.
- Nock, O.S. (1982). British Locomotives of the 20th Century. Vol. 1. Cambridge: Patrick Stephens Limited. ISBN 0850595959 – via Internet Archive.
- Ferguson, Niall; Stirling, David (2007). Caledonian in LMS Days. Railways in Retrospect (5 ed.). Easingwold: Pendragon Publishing. ISBN 9781899816156 – via Internet Archive.
