= Caledonian Railway 49 and 903 Classes =

British steam locomotives (built 1903–1906)

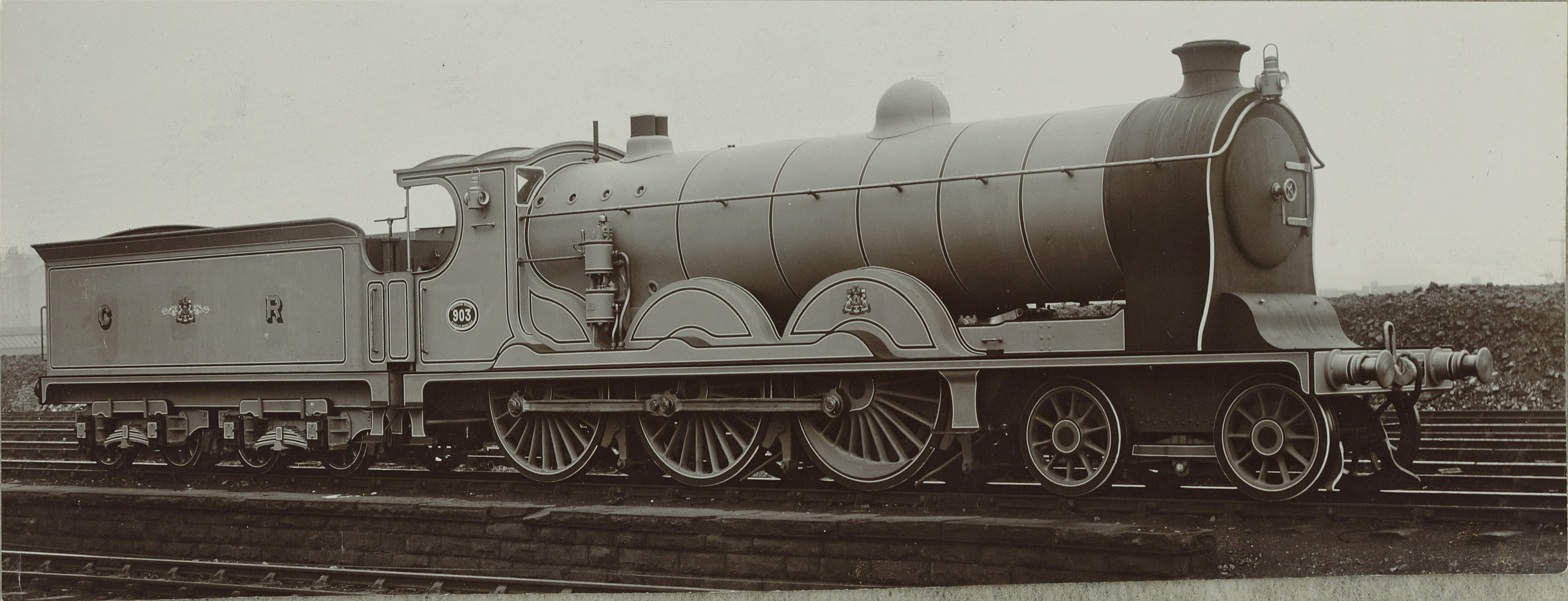
- CR 903 Cardean in 1906.
Type and origin
- Power type: Steam
- Designer: John F. McIntosh
- Builder: St. Rollox Works
- Build date: 49: 1903; 903: 1906
- Total produced: 49: 2; 903: 5
Specifications
- Configuration
  - Whyte: 4-6-0
  - UIC: 2′C n2
- Gauge: 4 ft 8 1/2 in (1,435 mm)
- Driver dia.: 6 ft 6 in (1.98 m)
- Loco weight: 70 long tons (71.1 t; 78.4 short tons) (as built); 71.5 long tons (72.6 t; 80.1 short tons) (as rebuilt)
- Tender weight: 55 long tons (55.9 t; 61.6 short tons)
- Boiler pressure: 200 psi (1,380 kPa) when built, 175 psi (1,210 kPa) as rebuilt
- Superheater: Schmidt (as rebuilt)
- Cylinders: Two, inside
- Cylinder size: New: 21 in × 26 in (533 mm × 660 mm) [20 in × 26 in (508 mm × 660 mm)] Rebuilt: 20.75 in × 26 in (527 mm × 660 mm)
- Valve gear: Stephenson
Performance figures
- Tractive effort: 25,000 lbf (110 kN) [22,700 lbf (101 kN)] when built, 21,300 lbf (95 kN) as rebuilt
Career
- Operators: Caledonian Railway; → London, Midland and Scottish Railway
- Class: CR: 49 and 903 classes
- Power class: LMS: 4P
- Numbers: CR: 49–50, 903–907; LMS: 14750–14755
- Withdrawn: 49: 1933; 903: 1915, 1927–1930
- Disposition: All scrapped

The Caledonian Railway 49 Class and 903 Class were 4-6-0 express passenger locomotives designed by John F. McIntosh and built at the Caledonian Railway's own St. Rollox Works in 1903 and 1906 respectively.

== 49 Class ==
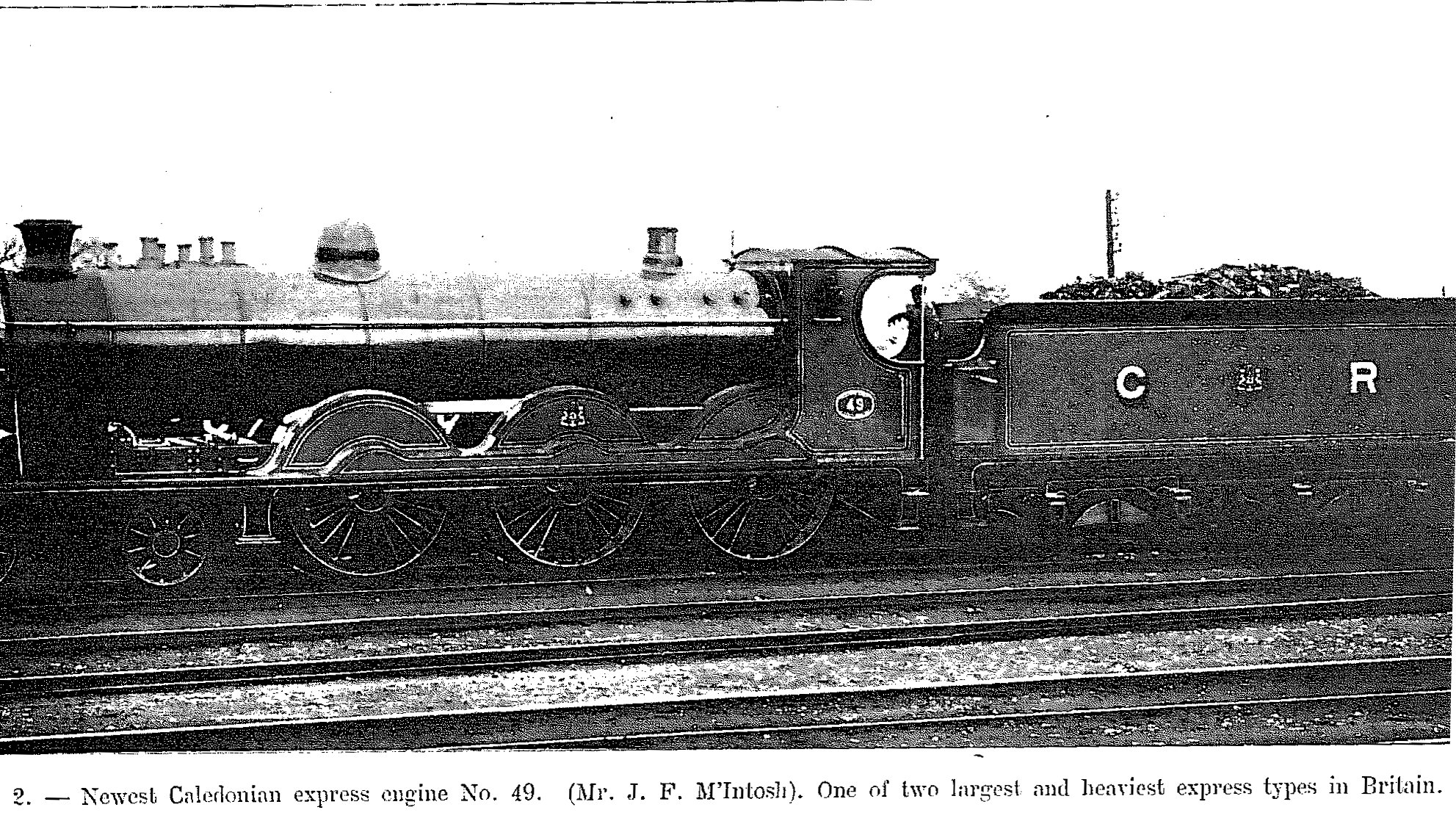
Locomotive No. 49 in 1903

In 1903, the Caledonian Railway had no passenger locomotives larger than 4-4-0s, and the heaviest trains over its main line between Glasgow and Carlisle required to be double headed, even in the less demanding southbound ('up') direction. Northbound ('down') trains also required banking assistance on the climb to Beattock Summit. In an effort to avoid these requirements, McIntosh designed a large 4-6-0 based on his 'Dunalastair' series of 4-4-0s. Two locomotives were built in 1903, and immediately became the Caledonian's flagship locomotives. Nonetheless, their performance did not live up to expectations, and it was soon clear that banking assistance was still required over Beattock. Until 1906 the Caledonian railway had no turntables long enough for the 49 Class, and arrangements for turning them included use of the Cathcart Circle or turning locomotive and tender separately.

== 903 Class ==
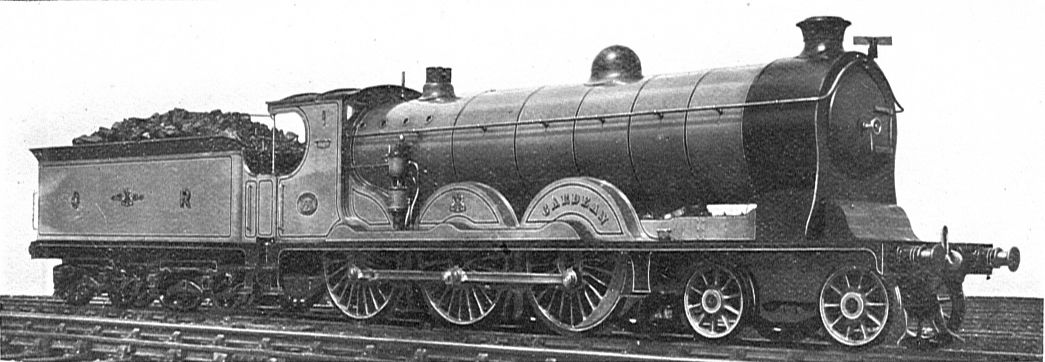
No. 903 "Cardean"

By 1906, experience with the 49 Class had enabled McIntosh to design an improved version, and the installation of new turntables at major engine sheds presaged the arrival of five new locomotives. The first of these, number 903, was named "Cardean" after the country estate of one of the CR directors, and immediately became the company's new flagship locomotive, with its name becoming a nickname for the whole class. The Caledonian gave the new locomotives a great deal of publicity and "Cardean" thus achieved some fame. Even so, the performance of the 903s was still unremarkable.

== Rebuilding and subsequent service ==
Neither class was equipped with superheating when built, but all seven locomotives were rebuilt with Schmidt superheaters and new cylinders during 1911. These modifications reduced coal consumption but made little difference to the locomotives' performance, and McIntosh built no more large passenger 4-6-0s (although he did build smaller 4-6-0s for goods traffic). His successor William Pickersgill had no greater success with his inadequate, outside-cylindered 60 Class or the highly unsuccessful three-cylinder 956 Class, so the Caledonian Railway continued to rely heavily upon 4-4-0s for express passenger traffic until the Grouping.

One 903 class locomotive was withdrawn in 1915 due to accident damage, but the other six locomotives passed to the London, Midland and Scottish Railway in 1923. The two 49 class locomotives were extensively renewed around 1924 with new frames and cylinders, but all of the Caledonian passenger 4-6-0s were quickly eclipsed by new LMS Compound 4-4-0 and Royal Scot 4-6-0s. The four surviving 903s were withdrawn in 1927–30, whilst the two 49s lasted until 1933. All were scrapped.

== Accidents and incidents ==
- On 2 April 1909, locomotive No. 903 Cardean was hauling a passenger train that became divided and was derailed at Crawford, Lanarkshire due to the failure of the crank axle of the locomotive. A few passengers suffered minor injuries.
- On 22 May 1915, locomotive No. 907 was hauling a local passenger train involved in Britain's worst ever railway accident, the double collision and fire at Quintinshill, Dumfriesshire in which at least 226 people were killed. The locomotive was taken to St Rollox works to be repaired, but due to the extent of the damage its rebuilding was abandoned and 907 was withdrawn and scrapped.

== Numbering and locomotive histories ==
Table of locomotives
CR no.	CR name	LMS no.	Delivered	Works	Withdrawn	Class	Notes
49		14750	March 1903	St. Rollox	March 1933	49 Class	
50	Sir James Thompson	14751	April 1903	St. Rollox	December 1933	49 Class	Last to be withdrawn
903	Cardean	14752	May 1906	St. Rollox	December 1930	903 Class	
904		14753	June 1906	St. Rollox	May 1929	903 Class	
905		14754	June 1906	St. Rollox	September 1927	903 Class	First to be withdrawn
906		14755	June 1906	St. Rollox	February 1928	903 Class	
907			July 1906	St. Rollox	May 1915	903 Class	Accident write-off

== See also ==
- Locomotives of the Caledonian Railway
