= Caledonian Railway 179 Class =

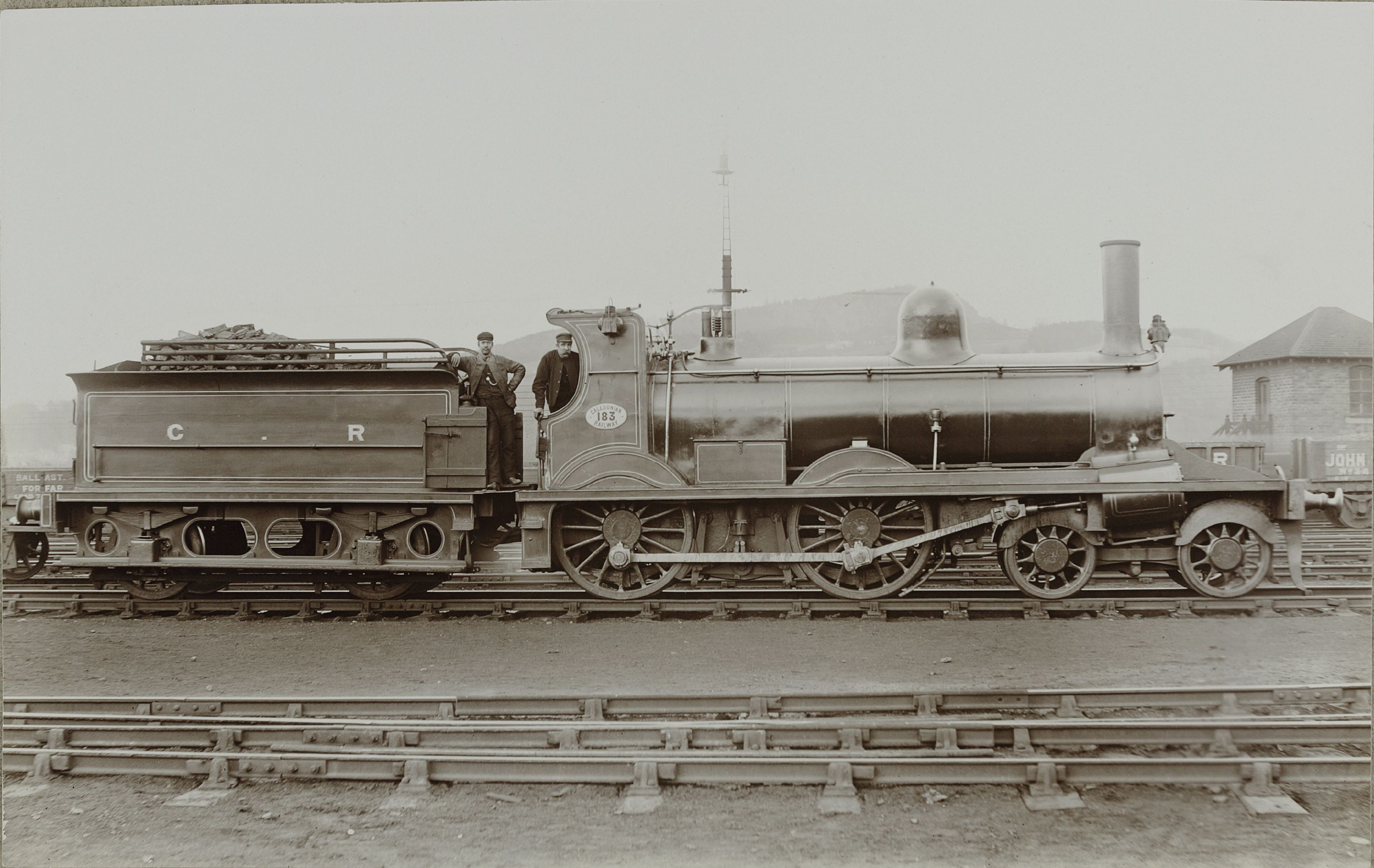
Type and origin
- Power type: Steam
- Designer: George Brittain
- Builder: Dübs & Co.
- Serial number: 1672–1681
- Build date: 1882
- Total produced: 10
Specifications
- Configuration
  - Whyte: 4-4-0
  - UIC: 2′B n2
- Gauge: 4 ft 8 1/2 in (1,435 mm)
- Driver dia.: 5 ft 2 in (1,575 mm)
- Minimum curve: 3 ft 2 in (965 mm)
- Loco weight: Originally: 41 long tons 11 3/4 cwt (42.25 t); Rebuilt: 40 long tons 17 1/2 cwt (41.53 t)
- Boiler pressure: Originally: 130 lbf/in^{2} (0.90 MPa); Rebuilt: 150 lbf/in^{2} (1.03 MPa)
- Heating surface: Originally: 1,146.42 sq ft (106.506 m^{2}); Rebuilt: 1,085.9 sq ft (100.88 m^{2})
- Cylinders: Two, outside
- Cylinder size: 18 in × 24 in (457 mm × 610 mm)
- Valve gear: Stephenson
Performance figures
- Tractive effort: Originally: 13,858 lbf (61.64 kN); Rebuilt: 15,991 lbf (71.13 kN)
Career
- Operators: Caledonian Railway; → London, Midland and Scottish Railway
- Class: CR: 179
- Power class: LMS: 1P
- Withdrawn: 1922–1930
- Disposition: All scrapped

The Caledonian Railway 179 Class (nicknamed Oban bogie) was a class of 4-4-0 steam locomotives designed by George Brittain for the Caledonian Railway (CR) and introduced in 1882.

Table of orders and numbers
CR nos.	Quantity	LMS nos.	Notes
179–188	10	14100–14107	CR 1184 and 1185 withdrawn 1922

All ten were built by Dübs and Company in 1882; they came with 4-wheel tenders to reduce the overall length in order to fit on the turntables. They were rebuilt and reboilered between 1898 and 1901. They were placed on the duplicate list (by adding 1000 to their original fleet number) between 1913 and 1914.

Two locomotives (1184 and 1185) were withdrawn in 1922. Eight survived into the ownership of the London, Midland and Scottish Railway (LMS) in 1923; who allocated them fleet numbers 14100–14107, but only three (14100/03/05) were renumbered. All had been withdrawn by 1930.

Table of withdrawals
Year	Quantity in service at start of year	Quantity withdrawn	Locomotive numbers	Notes
1922	10	2	1184, 1185	
1923	8	1	1181	
1924	7	1	1187	
1925	6	2	1180, 1188	
1927	4	1	1183	
1930	3	3	14100, 14103, 14105 (ex 1179, 1182, 1186)	
