= Glasgow Works =

Railway workshops in Glasgow, Scotland

Coordinates: 55.872°N 4.232°W

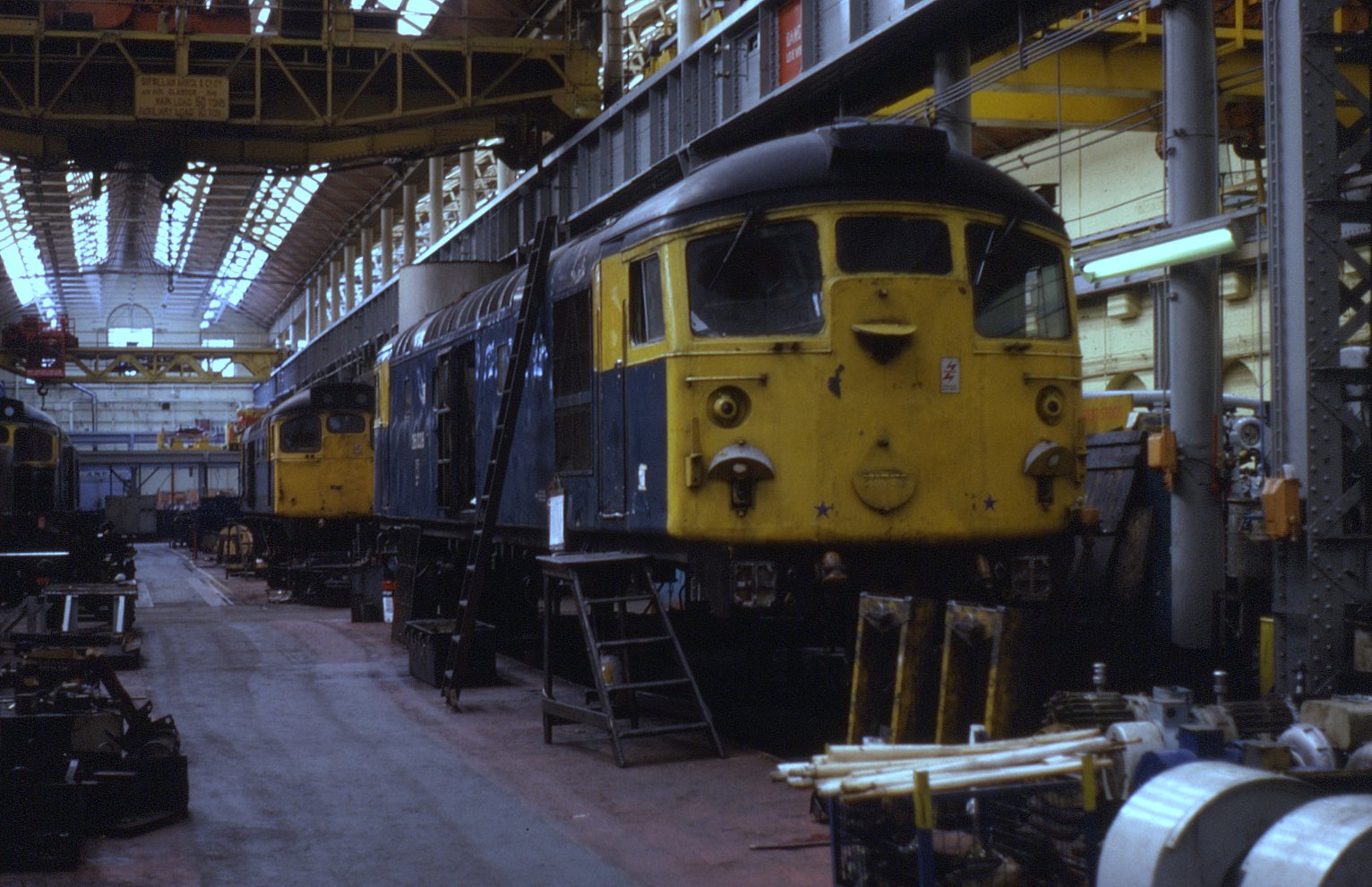
Inside the St Rollox Works, 1982

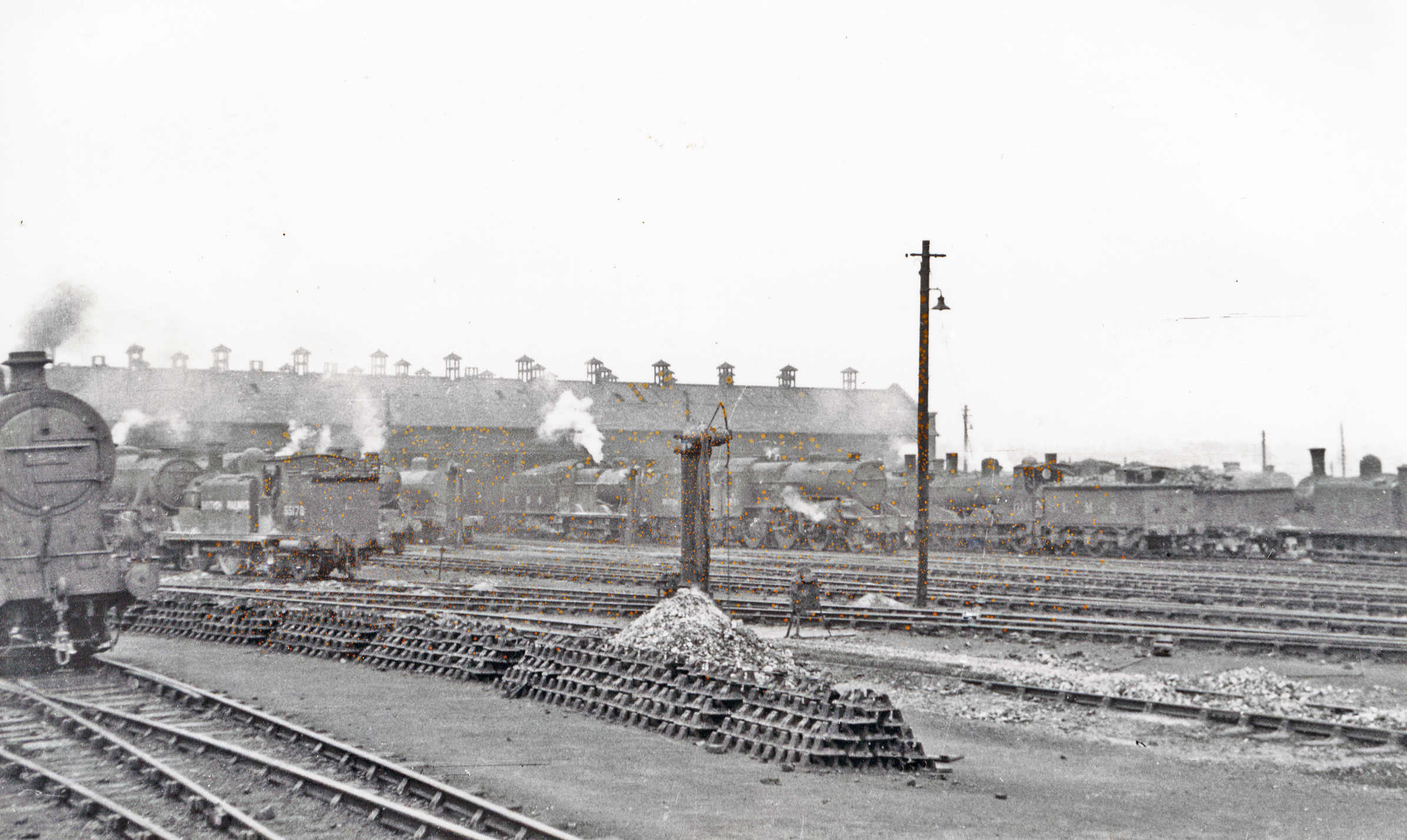
St Rollox Works and Depot, 1948

Glasgow Works, formerly the St Rollox Works, is a railway rolling stock heavy maintenance and repair works established in the 1850s in the Glasgow district of Springburn by the Caledonian Railway Company, and known locally as 'the Caley'.

Ownership of the works passed to the LMS in the 1920s and then to British Rail in the 1940s, with the size of the works reduced in the 1980s under British Rail Engineering Limited management. It was sold as part of the privatisation of British Rail in 1995 and after numerous ownership changes the site was operated by Mutares-owned subsidiary Gemini Rail under a lease from the landlord, Hansteen Holdings.

The site was purchased by businessman and philanthropist David Moulsdale in 2021 before achieving listed status in 2022. The site has since been fully restored, opened and connected to the railway mainline, and operates as a joint venture with Gibsons Engineering Ltd who maintain, repair and build rolling stock for the mainline railway and light rail tram systems. There are future plans to create a high-tech heavy engineering and manufacturing site, and the depot is currently undergoing electrification to allow EMU/electric rail vehicles to enter unaided from the mainline.

== History ==
=== Caledonian Railway ===
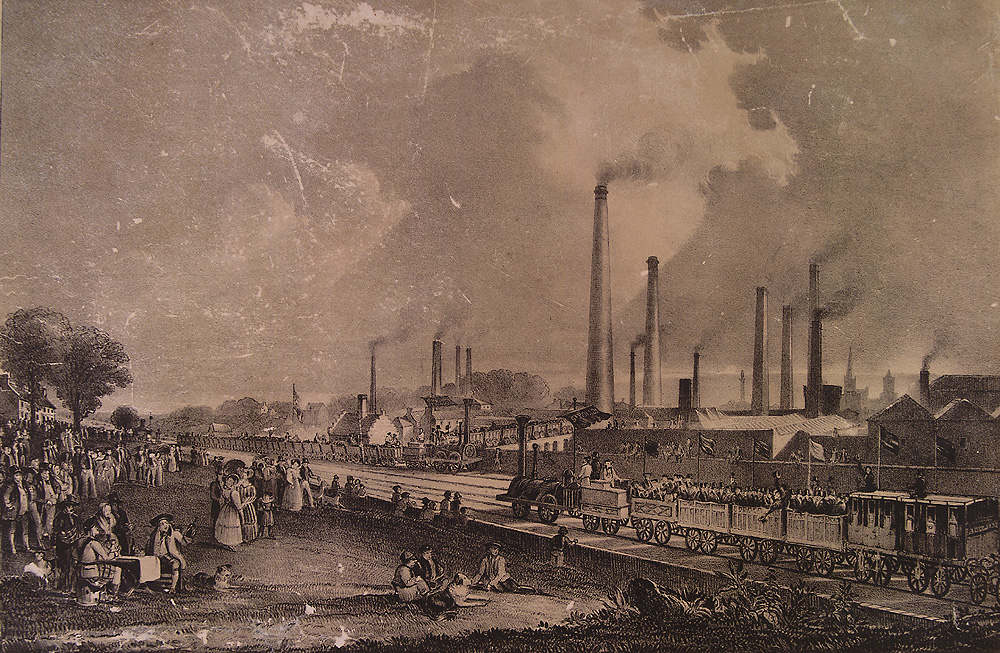
The Opening of the Garnkirk and Glasgow Railway by David Octavius Hill

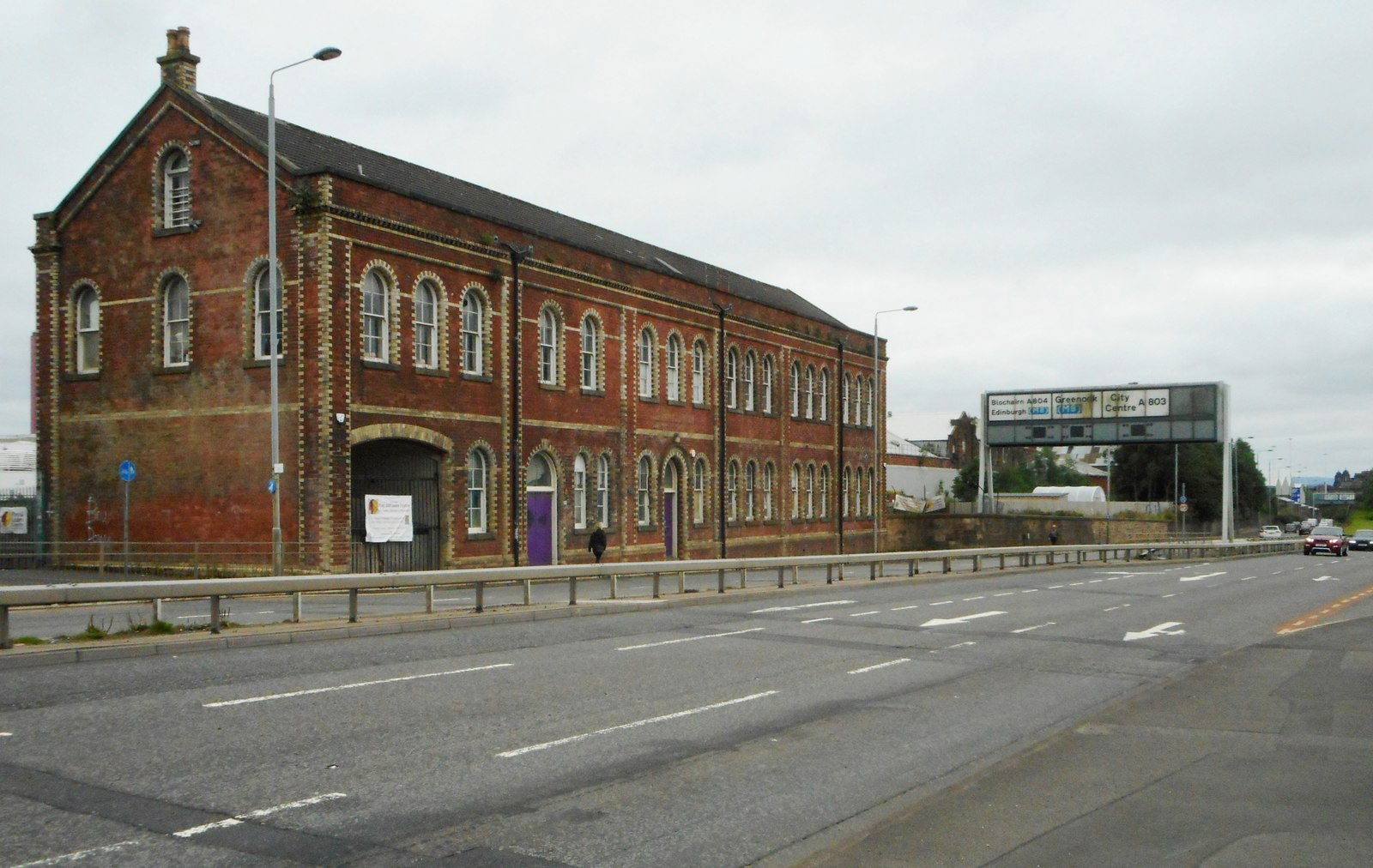
St Rollox House was originally the drawing office for the works, and is now used as offices by a charity

St Rollox Locomotive Works and St Rollox Carriage & Wagon Works were built in 1856 in Springburn, an area in the north-east of Glasgow, Scotland, for the Caledonian Railway, which had moved away from its works at Greenock to Springburn. The new works was built by the Caledonian Railway's locomotive superintendent Robert Sinclair near to the St Rollox Chemical Works of Charles Tennant on the north bank of the Monkland Canal and adjacent to the site of the St Rollox station on the Garnkirk and Glasgow Railway, one of the first railways in Scotland. The works and the terminus station was named after the nearby parish church of St Roche. The Caledonian Railway had previously acquired the Glasgow, Garnkirk and Coatbridge Railway in 1846, extending the line west to their new Glasgow terminus at Buchanan Street railway station in 1849, now the site of Glasgow Caledonian University.

The works was extended eastwards in 1864 and 1870, before being fully reconstructed by Dugald Drummond from 1882 to designs by Robert Dundas, which forms the remaining works buildings on the site today. The works was served by 30 sidings to the east and was capable of building carriages, wagons and locomotives, rather than just maintenance. The red-brick works offices facing Springburn Road were also built at this time. Among the locomotives produced for the Caledonian Railway were the Cardean and Dunalastair Classes.

=== London, Midland and Scottish Railway ===
After the First World War, the Railways Act 1921 also known as the Grouping Act, merged the Caledonian Railway Company into the newly created London, Midland and Scottish Railway (LMS). St Rollox became the main works of the Northern Division of the LMS but ceased building new locomotives by 1930. The final batches of main line locomotives built on site were lot 11-30 LMS class 4F 0-6-0 freight engines numbers 4177-4206 completed in 1925, and lot 45 comprising 10 locomotives of the same class completed in 1928. In 1929 wagon repairs were moved to the former Glasgow and South Western Railway's Barassie Works, leaving St Rollox as the locomotive and carriage repair centre.

=== War work ===
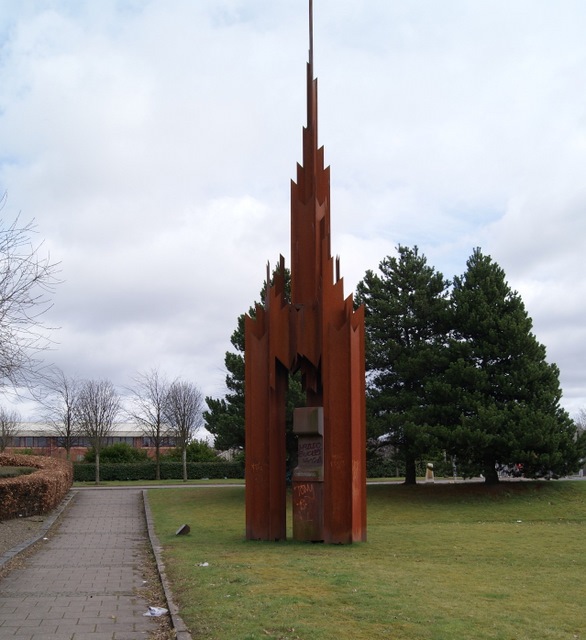
Monument to those who built locomotives at St Rollox, by Jack Sloan in 1995

During the Second World War, St Rollox joined in the war effort, producing, among other things, Airspeed Horsa gliders for the Normandy landing airborne assault. The nearby Cowlairs railway works also produced 200,000 bearing shells for Rolls-Royce Merlin engines. The Springburn-based North British Locomotive Company was also involved in wartime production.

=== British Rail ===
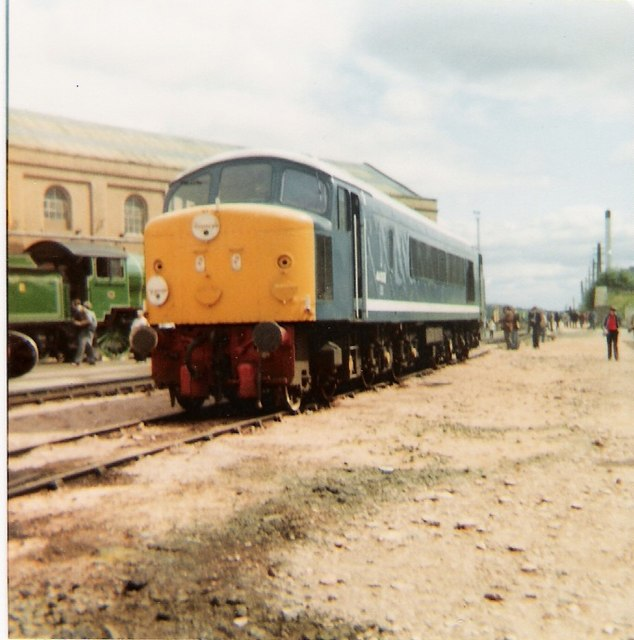
Steam and diesel locomotives on display at the Glasgow Works open day, 1981

After World War II, the railways were nationalised by the Transport Act 1947 into British Railways. The Scottish network was reorganised as the Scottish Region (ScR), one of six new regions of British Railways. The St Rollox works was designated as the primary Scottish repair centre for carriages and locomotives, as well as undertaking work for the London Midland Region of British Railways. In 1968, the nearby Cowlairs railway works, that had been previously operated as the main Scottish works for the North British Railway (NBR) then the London and North Eastern Railway (LNER), closed and merged into St Rollox under consolidation measures to form British Rail Engineering Limited (BREL) in 1969, with the loss of over 1,000 jobs in the Springburn area.

In 1972 the site was renamed from St Rollox Works to the Glasgow Works. In 1986, a major downsizing of the works was announced by the Transport Secretary Nicholas Ridley, with the loss of 1,206 jobs out of a workforce of 2,400, and a large section of the carriage works becoming disused. The northern part of the site was occupied for a time during the 1980s and early 1990s by MC Metals, which undertook the scrapping of old rolling stock.

=== Privatisation ===
After BREL was privatised in 1988, the site was kept in public ownership as a rail maintenance facility under British Rail Maintenance Limited (BRML) along with Eastleigh, Doncaster and Wolverton. In 1995 BRML was privatised and the site was sold to Railcare Ltd., a Babcock International/Siemens consortium, along with the Wolverton site for £6 million. During 1997 the disused part of the carriage works was demolished and surplus land was sold off to become the site of a large Tesco supermarket, which opened in 2001. A Costco, Lidl, new Springburn fire station and a Royal Mail sorting office were developed in the early 1990s to the north of the site on the former Sighthill Railfreight goods depot, which closed in 1981, forming the St Rollox Retail Park.

In 2002 the remaining St Rollox Works site was sold to Alstom, along with the Wolverton Works, which became the larger parent site of the operation. Alstom also sold the site to St Modwen Properties in a sale-and-leaseback deal. In 2007, the lease to operate the site was taken over by RailCare Ltd.

RailCare Ltd was placed in administration in July 2013. In August 2013 the operating lease was taken over by Knorr-Bremse, who in 2018 transferred it to Mutares and its new subsidiary, Gemini Rail. St Modwen's industrial property interests, including St Rollox, were acquired by Hansteen Holdings in 2018. Recent work included overhauls of Class 156, Class 158 and Class 320s for Abellio ScotRail.

=== Closure ===
In December 2018, the planned closure of St Rollox in July 2019 was announced by Gemini Rail and its German owner Mutares, despite the site running at a profit, with the loss of over 200 jobs and centralisation of maintenance work at the company's larger works in Wolverton. The workforce led a campaign against the closure in concert with the Unite and RMT trade unions, lobbying both the UK and Scottish Governments to renationalise the works, and putting forward several proposals to save the site from closure, even including a plan to commission the restoration of the Springburn-built South African Class GMA 4-8-2+2-8-4 'Springbok' locomotive, in storage at Summerlee, Museum of Scottish Industrial Life in Coatbridge, and local MP Paul Sweeney raised the matter at Theresa May's final Prime Minister's Questions. The workers held a rally as the final shift walked out after 163 years, on 26 July 2019.

In January 2020 that Jeremy Hosking's Locomotive Services Limited made an offer to purchase the St Rollox Works site for use as a heritage locomotive maintenance depot, but agreement could not be reached with the landlord on a price for the site. In April 2021, the works were purchased by Springburn Depot (SPV) Limited, a special-purpose vehicle owned by the Optical Express billionaire, David Moulsdale.

There are 2 preserved steam locomotives built by St Rollox.

- Caledonian Railway 812 Class 0-6-0 No. 828 of 1899, preserved at the Strathspey Railway
- Caledonian Railway 439 Class 0-4-4T No. 419 of 1907, preserved at the Bo'ness and Kinneil Railway

=== Listing ===
In May 2022, it was reported that an application by Paul Sweeney MSP for the site to be designated as listed by Historic Environment Scotland was successful, with the buildings and railway sidings awarded a category B listing. Historic Environment Scotland described it as "retaining many features which demonstrate its previous function, including its interconnected workshop design of high-quality ironwork". Dara Parsons, Head of Designations at HES, said: "The former St Rollox Works is a significant piece of Scotland's industrial and transport heritage, and a worthy addition to the list of Scotland's special buildings. It made an important contribution to railway history and to Springburn's role as a major centre for rail manufacture and repair in the 19th and 20th centuries."
