= Birkhill railway station =

Railway station in Falkirk, Scotland

Birkhill
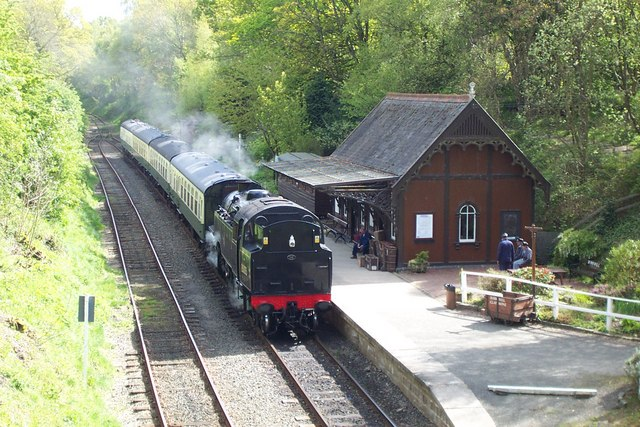

General information
- Location: Near Bo'ness, Falkirk (council area); Scotland
- Coordinates: 55°59′36″N 3°39′38″W
- Grid reference: NS965790
- System: Station on heritage railway
- Manager: Scottish Railway Preservation Society
- Platforms: 1

Key dates
- 1989: opened
Location

Birkhill railway station is a railway station on the Bo'ness and Kinneil Railway in Scotland, equidistant from Grangemouth, Bo'ness, Linlithgow and Polmont. The station was opened on 6 October 1838.

There was no station here until the Scottish Railway Preservation Society took over the branch line. The parts of the building were recovered from Monifieth railway station and were originally rebuilt in 1988 by Central Regional Council as their display at the Glasgow Garden Festival. When this closed the building was relocated to Birkhill. The summit of the line, located to the south of the station, was regraded and lowered to avoid the new platform being on an excessive gradient, and the station was opened to passengers in 1989. The station was the limit of regular train operations from Bo'ness until 2010 when the services were extended to Manuel. The adjacent Birkhill Fireclay Mine is in the Bo'ness area and an integral part of the town's history but the Fireclay mine closed in 2013. There is a station building. which houses a shop, a cafe, and the former access the Birkhill Fireclay Mine.

== History ==
There was no station at Birkhill in its working days but there was a loop, just north of the present station, a water column and a short siding off to the clay mine.

== Track layout ==
The track layout at Birkhill features a simple passing loop with two-lever ground frames at either end to control the points. The single platform was recently extended along with track realignment to accommodate 7-coach trains. The construction of a Caledonian Railway style signal box with as many as 20 levers, a water column for steam locomotives and a second platform has been proposed, however no date has been set for completion.

Preceding station	Heritage railways	Following station
Kinneil towards Bo'ness	Bo'ness & Kinneil Railway	Manuel Junction Terminus
Historical railways
Kinneil	Slamannan and Borrowstounness Railway	Manuel Junction
