= Polmont railway station =

Railway station in Falkirk, Scotland

Polmont Scottish Gaelic: Poll-Mhonadh
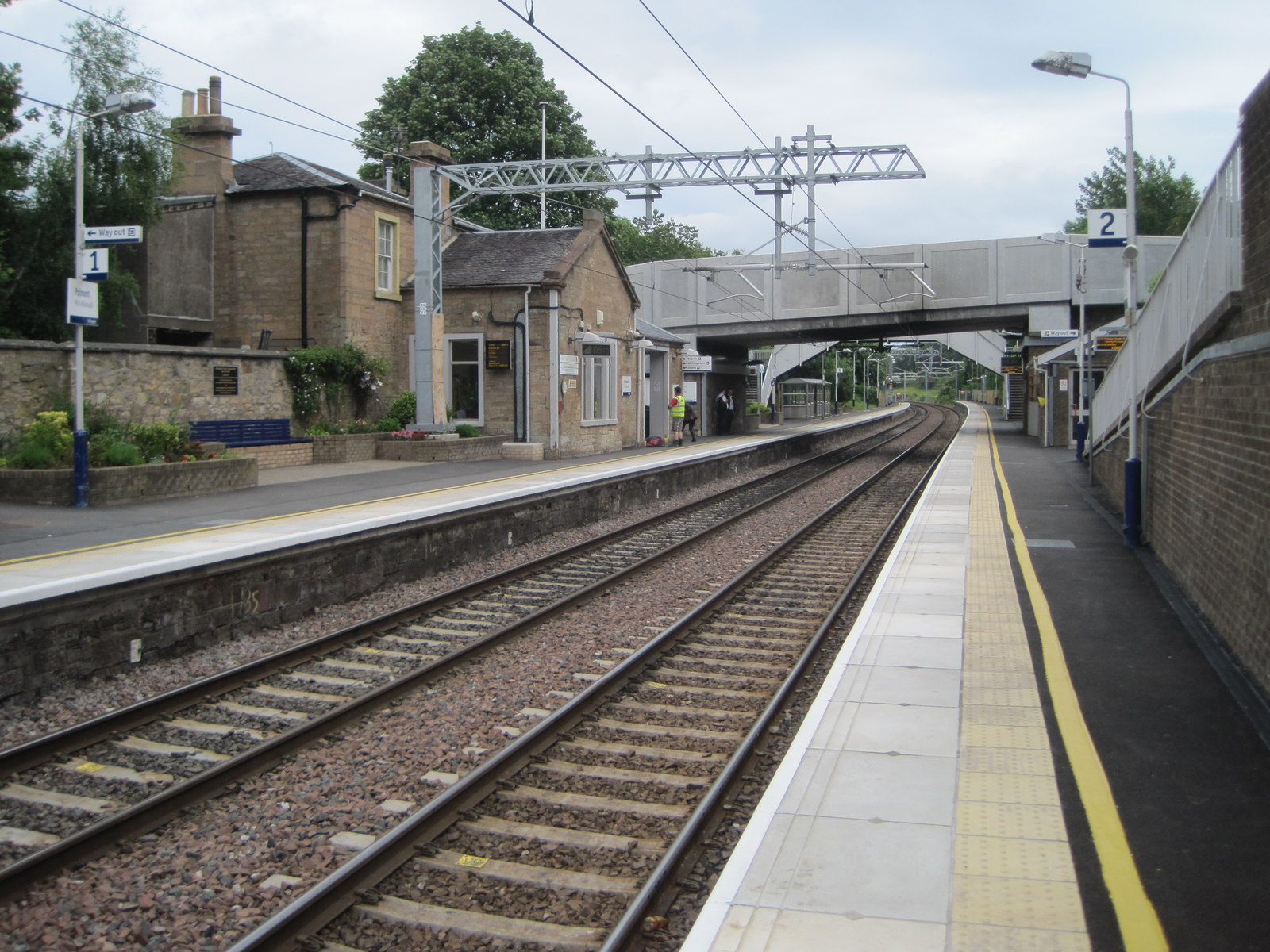
- Polmont station in 2018, following bridge rebuilding and electrification works

General information
- Location: Polmont, Falkirk; Scotland
- Coordinates: 55.9846°N 3.7149°W
- Grid reference: NS930781
- Manager: ScotRail
- Platforms: 2

Other information
- Station code: PMT

History
- Opened: 1842
- Original company: Edinburgh and Glasgow Railway
- Pre-grouping: North British Railway
- Post-grouping: London and North Eastern Railway

Passengers
- 2020/21: ▼69,402
- 2021/22: ▲0.340 million
- 2022/23: ▲0.521 million
- 2023/24: ▲0.649 million
- 2024/25: ▲0.696 million
Location
Notes
- Passenger statistics from the Office of Rail and Road

Polmont railway station is a railway station serving the village of Polmont, Scotland as well as the other Falkirk Braes villages. It is located on the Glasgow to Edinburgh via Falkirk Line and is also served by ScotRail services from Edinburgh to Stirling and Dunblane. It is the nearest station to much of the town of Grangemouth.

== History ==
It is situated on the Edinburgh and Glasgow Railway, which was the first railway to be built between the two cities. It opened with the line in 1842 and became a junction eight years later with the opening of the Stirlingshire Middle Junction Railway to Larbert via Falkirk Grahamston. This linked the E&G main line with the Scottish Central Railway route northwards to Perth via Stirling, creating a direct route from Edinburgh to Stirling & Dunblane. The SMJR was taken over by the E&GR prior to opening on 1 October 1850, with the E&GR being absorbed in turn by the North British Railway in 1865. The NBR then became part of the London and North Eastern Railway on 1 January 1923.

The station also later served as the main line interchange for the Slamannan and Borrowstounness Railway's branch line to Bo'ness, access to the branch being made by a west facing chord near to the point where the Slamannan line passed beneath the E&GR. A bay platform was provided at Polmont for use by branch trains, though it wasn't until 1933 that services began running there - prior to that they had used a bi-level station further east at Manuel. The branch passenger service was withdrawn by the British Transport Commission on 7 May 1956, but it remained in use for freight until 1975 and has since been reopened as the heritage Bo'ness and Kinneil Railway.

The station gained a (somewhat unwanted) place in British railway history in the mid-1980s, as it was near here that the Polmont rail accident occurred in July 1984. 13 people died and more than 60 were injured when an Edinburgh to Glasgow express derailed at speed in a cutting just west of the junction, after colliding with a cow that had escaped from a field adjacent to the line (through damaged fencing) and wandered onto the track.

== Services ==
- 2 trains per hour (tph) to Glasgow Queen Street via Falkirk High
- 2 trains per hour to Dunblane via Stirling
- 4 tph to Edinburgh Waverley

This means there is roughly a train every 15 minutes to/from Edinburgh.

Previously, there was services to Glasgow Queen Street via Cumbernauld, and a daily return peak time service to Fife (from Kirkcaldy in the morning, returning to Markinch in the evening).

The Highland Chieftain, a service operated by London North Eastern Railway from London King's Cross to Inverness passes through the station, as does the Caledonian Sleeper service between Inverness and London Euston. However neither stops here.

Preceding station	National Rail	Following station
Linlithgow	ScotRail; Glasgow-Edinburgh via Falkirk line	Falkirk High
Linlithgow	ScotRail; Edinburgh–Dunblane Line	Falkirk Grahamston
	Historical railways	
Manuel; Line open, station closed	North British Railway; Edinburgh and Glasgow Railway	Falkirk High; Line and station open
Manuel; Line open, station closed	North British Railway; Stirlingshire Midland Junction Railway	Falkirk Grahamston; Line and station open
