= Kinneil =

Kinneil may refer to:

- Kinneil House, a historic house near Bo'ness, Scotland
- Kinneil railway station, in Bo'ness
- The Bo'ness and Kinneil Railway
- SS Telefon, a Norwegian cargo ship renamed SS Kinneil under British ownership
