= Bo'ness Junction rail crash =

1874 railway incident in Scotland

Details
- Date: 27 January 1874; 07:15
- Location: Bo'ness Junction, Falkirk
- Coordinates: 55.9778°N 3.6585°W
- Country: Scotland
- Line: Edinburgh and Glasgow Railway
- Cause: Signaller's error

Statistics
- Trains: 2
- Deaths: 16
- Injured: 28

Bo'ness Junction rail crash occurred at Bo'ness Junction in Falkirk, Scotland on 27 January 1874. A passenger express train collided with a goods train – 16 people were killed and 28 injured.

The junction lies on the Edinburgh and Glasgow Railway between Falkirk and Linlithgow where the line to Bo'ness joined from the north near Manuel station.

On the morning of 27 January 1874 the East Coast Scotch express had been divided at Edinburgh and was due to pass the junction in two portions; the first bound for Glasgow at 07:02 and the second bound for Perth at 07:07, but were running 8 minutes late. As soon as the Glasgow express passed, a goods train waiting in sidings at the junction was shunted across onto the main line, and the Perth express collided with it. It is believed that the station staff mistook the late-running Glasgow train for the second Perth express. Signals should have prevented the disaster but it is believed they were incorrectly set. Only when the roar of the approaching express could be heard were the signals were put back to danger, but it was too late to prevent the collision. 16 people were killed and 28 injured. A road bridge near the point of impact was so badly damaged it had to be demolished.

The tragedy was heightened by the fact that the absolute block signalling system which would have prevented the disaster (by preventing more than one train from occupying a section of route at the same time) was being installed at the time, and was due to be switched on only 10 days later.
