= Class 159 =

Class 159 may refer to:

- British Rail Class 159
- Caledonian Railway 0-4-4T#William Pickersgill
