= Polmont rail accident =

1984 Scotland train disaster

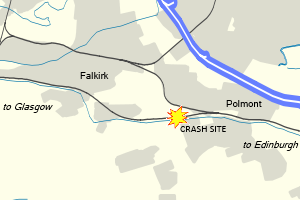
- Approximate location of the Polmont rail accident

Details
- Date: 30 July 1984; 17:55 (BST)
- Location: West of Polmont; 21.5 mi (34.6 km) west-northwest from Edinburgh
- Coordinates: 55.9845°N 3.7450°W
- Country: Scotland
- Line: Glasgow to Edinburgh via Falkirk Line
- Operator: British Railways Scottish Region
- Incident type: Derailment
- Cause: Obstruction on line

Statistics
- Trains: 1
- Passengers: 150+
- Deaths: 13
- Injured: 61 (17 serious)

The Polmont rail accident, also known as the Polmont rail disaster, occurred on 30 July 1984 to the west of Polmont, near Falkirk, in Scotland. A westbound push–pull express train travelling from Edinburgh to Glasgow struck a cow which had gained access to the track through a damaged fence from a field near Polmont railway station, causing all six carriages and the locomotive of the train to derail. 13 people were killed and 61 others were injured, 17 of them seriously. The accident led to a debate about the safety of push–pull trains on British Rail.

== Background ==
The accident happened on one of the busiest commuter lines in Scotland. At the time of the accident, British Rail passenger trains between Glasgow Queen Street and Edinburgh Waverley were operated by the push–pull technique with a single British Rail Class 47 locomotive located at one end of the train at all times – the locomotive usually pulled the carriages from Glasgow to Edinburgh and pushed them on the return journey.

At the other end of the train was a Driving Brake Standard Open (DBSO). DBSO carriages were introduced on the line in 1980 and consisted of a passenger carriage with a control cab at the front for the driver; a DBSO would be situated at the front of the train allowing the driver to control the locomotive with a set of remote controls from which control signals were sent through the lighting circuits of the train to the locomotive pushing from behind. This system meant that the train could continuously run between the two cities without having to allow time to switch the locomotive to the front of the train between departures. However, it left the front of the train vulnerable when being pushed from behind because the front end was lighter than the rear and had the risk of being pushed over an obstruction, leading to derailment.

== Accident ==
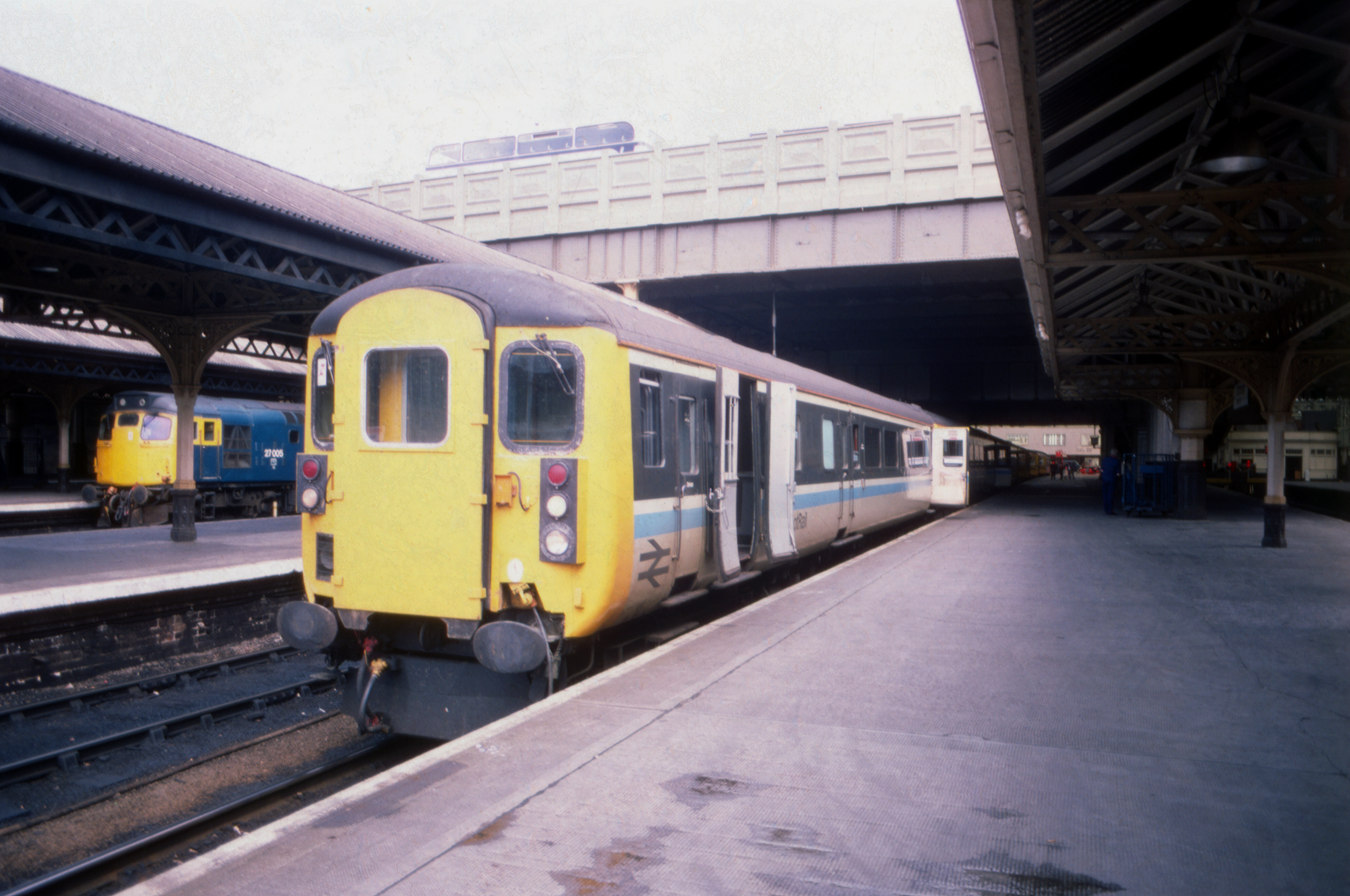
A DBSO similar to the one involved in the accident.

On Monday 30 July 1984, a westbound express train, the 17:30 service from Edinburgh Waverley to Glasgow Queen Street – consisting of a British Rail Class 47/7 diesel–electric locomotive pushing five Mark 3 coaches and fronted by a DBSO (no. 9706) – made a scheduled stop at Linlithgow station and accelerated to approximately 85 mph (137 km/h), passing through Polmont station shortly afterwards.

To the west of Polmont, the track curved left and passed the junction for Stirling, then curved right with a steady gradient towards Falkirk High station. After passing the junction the train driver, John Tennant, spotted a cow on the line in the cutting on the approach to Falkirk High and made an emergency brake application; he had only between six and 12 seconds to react to the obstruction and apply the emergency brakes because of the curvature of the track. The dynamics of the train, with the locomotive pushing from behind, meant that when the brakes were applied from the DBSO at the front; there was a delay in transmission of the signal to the locomotive brakes to prevent a sudden backlash to the carriages in front; this caused the train to decelerate only slightly. The train hit the cow, an adult Ayrshire weighing 320–450 kg (710–990 lb), at 17:55 (BST).

The cow was killed on impact, but a significant part of the carcass, later thought to be a leg bone, became trapped under the leading bogie of the DBSO, lifting it off the track and derailing it. The DBSO ran derailed for approximately 100 yards (90 m) and then veered to the left, before running up the edge of the cutting into trees at the top. It then turned on its side, as it was pushed around by the force of the train behind. The second vehicle, after climbing over the rear end of the DBSO, somersaulted end over end, eventually hitting the fifth vehicle as it ran past it. The third vehicle was hit by the DBSO, as it fell back down the wall of the cutting, after rebounding from the trees. The DBSO and third vehicle were so badly damaged that they had to be cut up on site.

Casualties were mainly in the two leading vehicles; most fatalities were due to passengers being ejected through windows, being hit by other passengers or by objects as the vehicles were thrown about. The possibility of trains being fitted with seatbelts was raised and rejected, as it was again 20 years later after the derailment at Ufton Nervet in 2004.

The main focus was that the light axle-loading of the DBSO had led to its being more easily derailed than a heavier vehicle would have been; modifications were put in place to lessen the chances of a recurrence of the derailment. This problem was to be revisited in the Great Heck accident in 2001, where a leading coach of a train being powered from the rear was again derailed by an object (this time a motor vehicle) on the line.

== Recommendations ==
The inquiry made recommendations which were followed; the main ones of which were:

- Object deflectors were to be fitted to the leading vehicles of all trains that had an axle load of less than 16 tonnes.
- Improvements to fencing where livestock were adjacent to the railway.

== Memorial ==
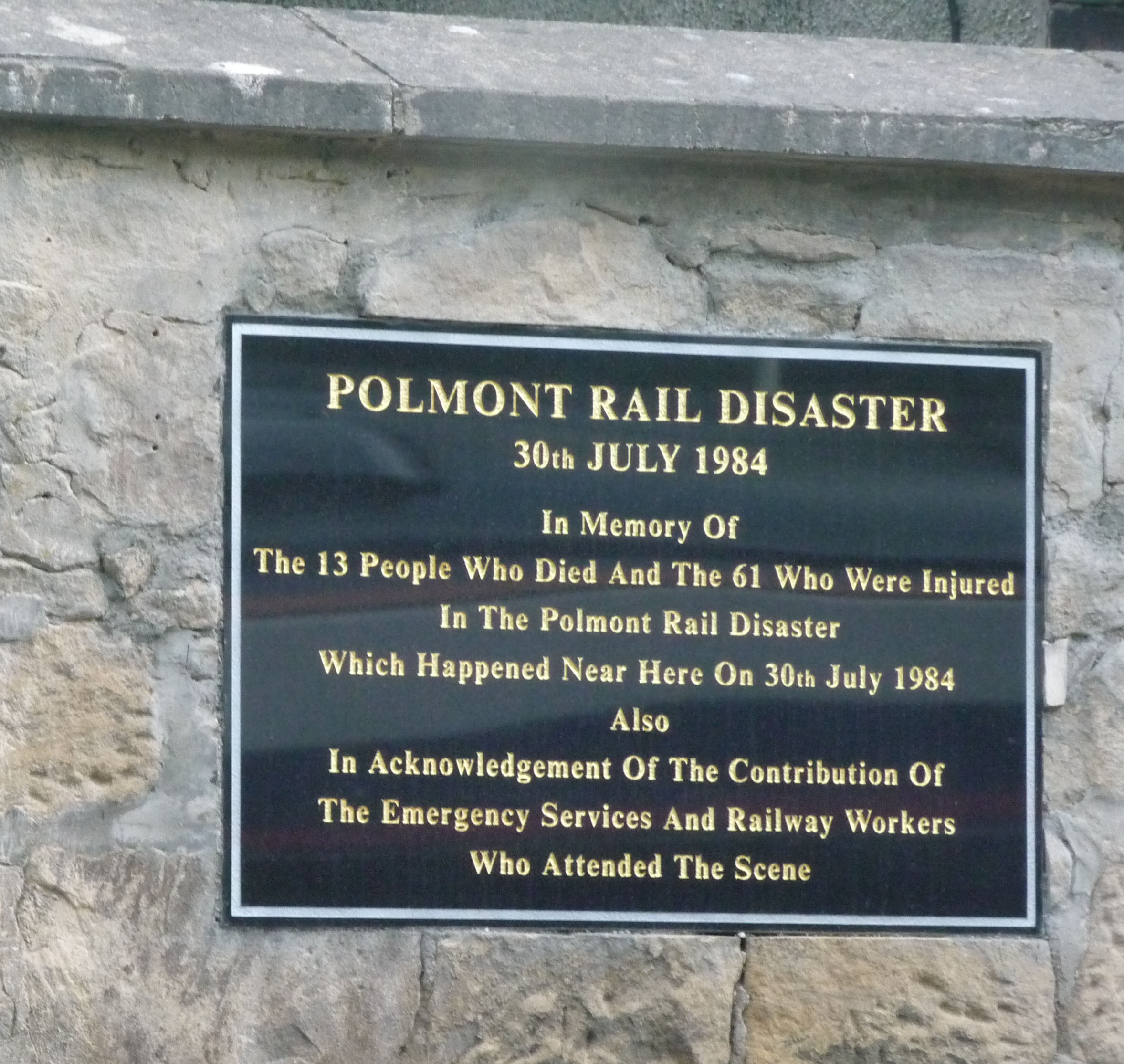
Memorial plaque at Polmont station

In 2009, on the 25th anniversary of the accident, a memorial plaque at Polmont station was erected and unveiled by Falkirk Council, First ScotRail and the local emergency services, to remember those who died and were injured. The memorial also commended the actions of the emergency services, railway workers and others who responded to the incident.
