= Bo'ness railway station =

Disused railway station in Falkirk, Scotland

Bo'ness
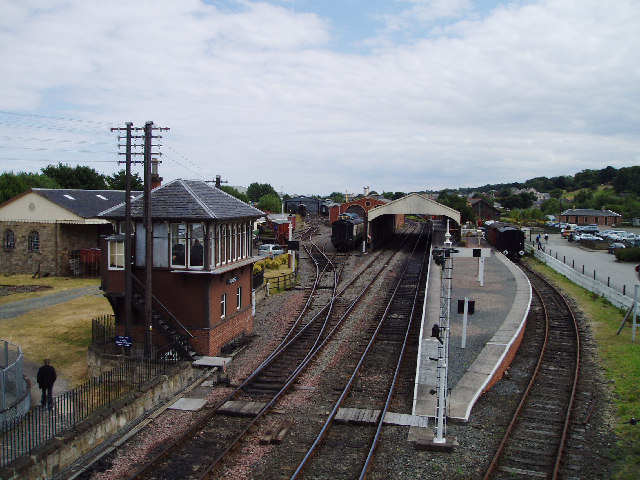

General information
- Location: Bo'ness, Falkirk (council area); Scotland
- Coordinates: 56°01′05″N 3°36′02″W
- Grid reference: NT003817
- System: Station on heritage railway
- Manager: Scottish Railway Preservation Society
- Platforms: 2

History
- Original company: Slamannan and Borrowstounness Railway
- Pre-grouping: North British Railway
- Post-grouping: LNER

Key dates
- 1 March 1856: first station opened
- 20 March 1856: closed
- 20 June 1856: reopened
- 7 May 1956: closed
- 1981: present heritage railway station opened
Location

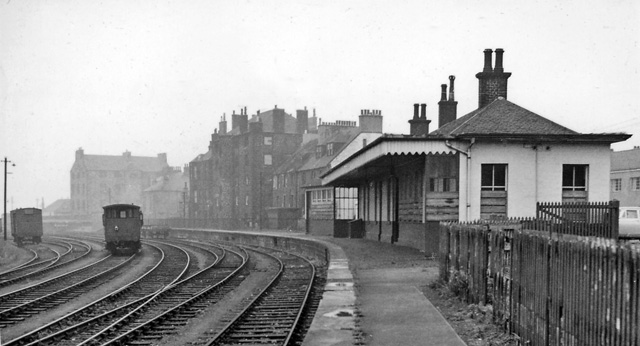
Remains of the original Bo'ness station in 1961

Bo'ness railway station is a heritage railway station in Bo'ness, Falkirk, Scotland. It is not the original Bo'ness railway station, which was located roughly a quarter mile west on Seaview Place, now the site of a car park.

The station has a booking office, buffet, shop, information desk, large free car park, bay platform, footbridge and trainshed which covers the platforms. This is the easternmost station of the Bo'ness and Kinneil Railway, operated by volunteer members of the Scottish Railway Preservation Society.

The buildings in the station area were brought to Bo'ness in the 1980s, saving each of them from permanent demolition elsewhere. Of these, the trainshed is the most important historically. It was originally built at Edinburgh Haymarket station, and was the original Edinburgh terminus of the Edinburgh and Glasgow Railway, which opened in February 1842. At Haymarket, two similar trainshed bays stood side by side and abutted the two-storey station offices building which still stands today. Haymarket station remained a terminus only until 1846, when the railway was extended partly in tunnel and partly in cutting through Princes Street Gardens to Waverley station. The extension passed by the Haymarket trainshed on its southern side. When traffic through Haymarket increased after the opening of the Forth Bridge, the tracks into Waverley were quadrupled. To make space for these tracks, the southern bay of the original trainshed was demolished. The northern bay remained standing, latterly providing no more than car parking space, until plans for alterations to the station in the 1980s required its removal. As the building was listed, it was carefully removed for re-erection at Bo'ness. This work was managed by Sir Robert McAlpine & Sons.

Cast iron columns and arched spans support the trainshed roof, which is slated on wooden sarking in the standard Scottish manner. The roof trusses are of wrought iron tension members and cast iron posts, and all the ironwork is detailed in a light classical style. At Bo'ness, as at Haymarket, there are no smoke ventilators, though smoke troughs have been added to reduce soiling from locomotive exhausts.

The station office building at Bo'ness was originally built by the North British Railway at Wormit, on the south shore of the Tay facing Dundee. This station was located on the Tayport branch, close to the end of the Tay Bridge, and opened at the same time as the second bridge, in 1887.

Bo'ness signal box is a standard Caledonian Railway structure. It was originally Garnqueen South Junction box, the location where the route of the Caledonian Railway Main Line, heading north, diverged from the route of the Monkland and Kirkintilloch Railway.

The footbridge adjacent originally stood at Murthly station, on the Highland Railway main line north of Perth.

As a group, the buildings are listed by Historic Scotland in Category A.

The stone built goods shed and the Buffet/Shop building housing the Visitor Information Point are modern construction.

Being base of the SRPS's many operational fields such as railtours, steam and diesel locomotive restoration and maintenance and facilities for maintenance of the Bo'ness and Kinneil Railway itself requires a sizable yard, a diesel MMPD, a steam traction running shed and restoration building (Romney Hut), a coaling stage and water column, a carriage and wagon restoration and storage building and signalling stores among other facilities.

A new Display Shed between the MMPD and the carriage and wagon building was erected in 2011 to provide housing for railway artifacts that were previously left out in the open such as the Class 303 EMU "Blue Train" and the Class 126 Inter-City DMU along with various rolling stock and diesel locomotives which is open for the general public to view the artifacts stored within the shed. A Visitor Trail public walkway from the car park at the southern edge runs along its eastern boundary, to the Display Shed, and continues around past the MMPD and along the northern edge of the site, providing a new disabled-friendly access route to the Museum of Scottish Railways. The walkway also passes a model railway (open to the public on weekends and bank holidays) housed in two wooden Norwegian carriages, which contains a small village and station, Glenauchter, although this is based on Gleneagles railway station rather than Bo'ness.

Preceding station	Heritage railways	Following station
Kinneil towards Manuel Junction	Bo'ness & Kinneil Railway	Terminus
Historical railways
Kinneil	North British Railway; Slamannan and Borrowstounness Railway	Terminus
