= Kinneil railway station =

Former railway station in Scotland

Kinneil

General information
- Location: Bo'ness, Falkirk (council area); Scotland
- Coordinates: 56.0148°N 3.6258°W
- Grid reference: NS987814
- System: Station on heritage railway
- Manager: Scottish Railway Preservation Society
- Platforms: 1

Key dates
- 1899: original station opened
- 22 Sept.1930: original station closed
- 1985: present station opened
Location

Kinneil railway station, also known as Kinneil Halt, is a railway station in Bo'ness, Scotland. The station is a request stop to start the tour of the Kinneil nature reserve. It is located in the area previously occupied by Kinneil Colliery and as a result, the railway in the vicinity is very tightly curved and has a speed limit of just 10 mph due to possible subsidence. Between 1985 and 1989 it was the line's terminus and included a loop which has now been partially removed.

== Original station ==
The original station was opened by the North British Railway on 2 January 1899 and closed on 22 September 1930. It was subsequently demolished after closure.

Preceding station	Heritage railways	Following station
Birkhill towards Manuel Junction	Bo'ness & Kinneil Railway	Bo'ness Terminus
Historical railways
Manuel Junction	Slamannan and Borrowstounness Railway	Bo'ness
