= Whitecross, Falkirk =

Coordinates: 55.9739°N 3.6568°W

Whitecross
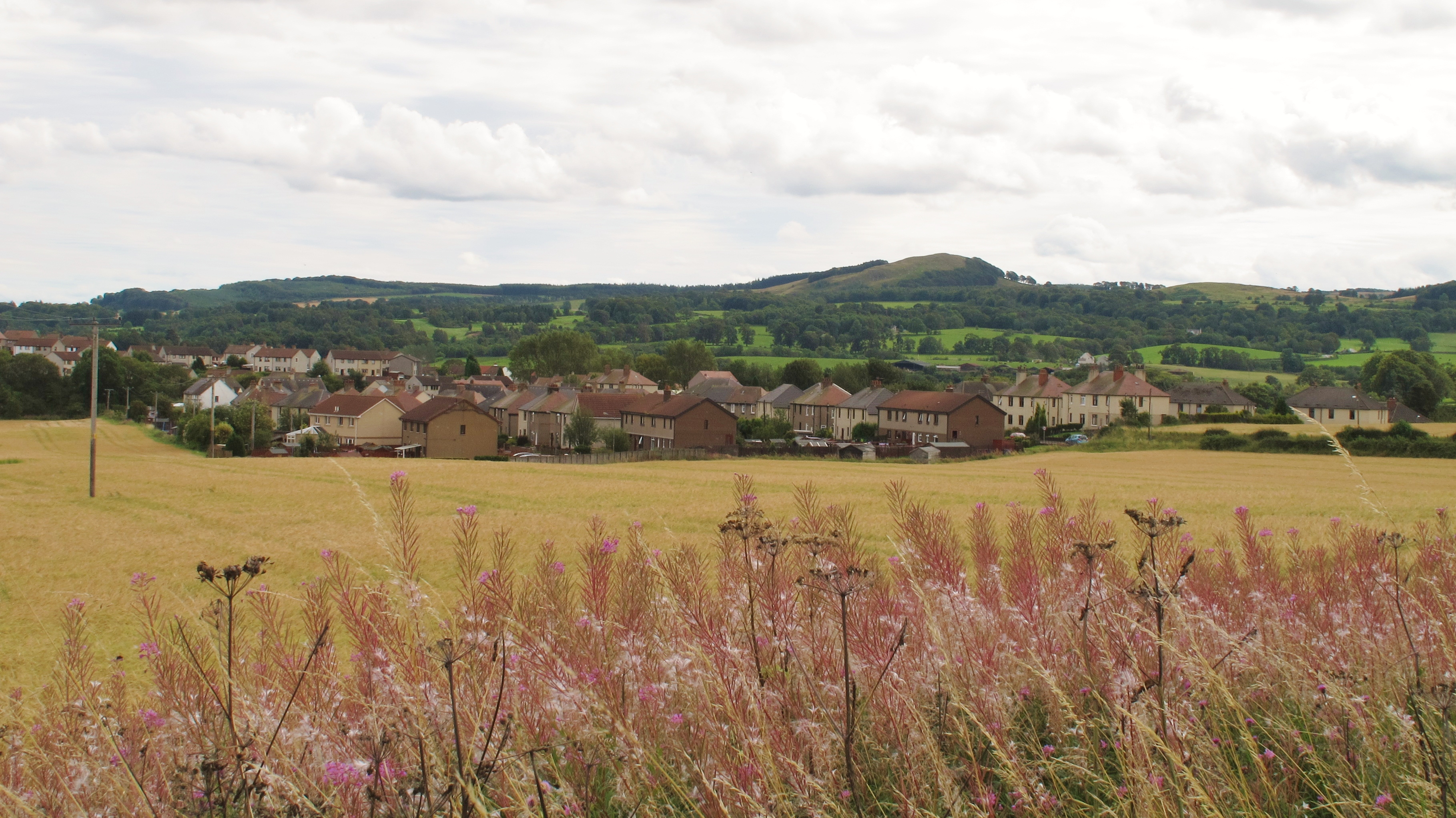
- Whitecross village, with Cockleroi beyond

- Location within the Falkirk council area
- Area: 0.06 sq mi (0.16 km^{2})
- Population: 750 (2020)
  - Density: 12,500/sq mi (4,800/km^{2})
- OS grid reference: NS968769
  - Edinburgh: 18.1 mi (29.1 km) ESE
  - London: 341 mi (549 km) SSE
- Civil parish: Muiravonside
- Council area: Falkirk
- Lieutenancy area: Stirling and Falkirk
- Country: Scotland
- Sovereign state: United Kingdom
- Post town: LINLITHGOW
- Postcode district: EH49
- Dialling code: 01506
- Police: Scotland
- Fire: Scottish
- Ambulance: Scottish
- UK Parliament: Falkirk
- Scottish Parliament: Falkirk East
- Website: falkirk.gov.uk

Whitecross is a small village within the Falkirk council area, close to the boundary of West Lothian council in Scotland. It lies 2.0 miles (3.2 km) west-southwest of Linlithgow and 2.5 miles (4.0 km) south-east of Polmont on the west bank of the River Avon. Until the end of World War II it was literally a handful of buildings, but expanded thereafter with a housing estate planned by Stirlingshire County Council in 1945.

The United Kingdom 2001 census reported the population as 819.

Manuel Junction, where the branch line from Bo'ness used by the Scottish Railway Preservation Society meets the Glasgow-Edinburgh via Falkirk line, lies north-east of Whitecross. The main local industries were a brickworks and coal mining, both now ceased. The Avon Aqueduct carries the Union Canal across the River Avon just south of Whitecross.

The ruins of Manuel Priory are close to Whitecross on the eastern, West Lothian, bank of the Avon. This was a Cistercian convent founded, or perhaps re-founded, in the reign of King Malcolm IV of Scotland (1153–1165). The remains of the 15th century Haining Castle lie in the grounds of the former Manuel brickwork north-east of Whitecross.

== See also ==
- Falkirk Braes villages
- List of places in Falkirk council area
