= Manuel Junction =

Railway junction in Scotland

Manuel Manuel Junction

General information
- Location: Near Whitecross, Falkirk (council area); Scotland
- Coordinates: 55.9776°N 3.6562°W
- Grid reference: NS966773
- System: Station on heritage railway
- Operator: Scottish Railway Preservation Society
- Platforms: Historic - 3 (2 Upper, 1 Lower), Preservation - 1

History
- Original company: Edinburgh and Glasgow Railway and Slamannan and Borrowstounness Railway
- Pre-grouping: North British Railway
- Post-grouping: London and North Eastern Railway

Key dates
- 21 February 1842: Bo'ness Junction (high level) opened on E&GR
- 10 June 1856: Manuel (low level) opened on S&BR (Monkland Railways)
- January 1866: High level station renamed Manuel
- Unknown: High level station renamed Manuel High Level; Low Level station rename Manuel Low Level
- 1 May 1933: Manuel Low Level closed
- 6 March 1967: Manuel High Level closed
- 1990: Track restored between Birkhill and Manuel by BR
- 9 May 2010: Bo'ness and Kinneil Railway service extended to Manuel
- 29 June 2013: New-built platform opened at Manuel
Location

Manuel Junction is a railway junction near the village of Whitecross, Falkirk, Scotland. It is the terminus of the Bo'ness and Kinneil Railway (operated by the Scottish Railway Preservation Society (SRPS)) and forms a connection between it and the Glasgow–Edinburgh via Falkirk line.

It is not to be confused with Bo'ness Junction, which refers rather to the mainline junction adjacent to Manuel Junction on the Edinburgh–Glasgow line. There is no station here but services operated almost entirely by ScotRail pass on the Edinburgh–Glasgow service and Edinburgh–Dunblane service. The area's signals are controlled by Edinburgh Signalling Centre (SC). There is a loop on the westbound side and a disused west facing siding. The siding leading to the Bo'ness and Kinneil Railway and Manuel Junction is east facing on the eastbound side and is controlled by Bo'ness ground frame, which is released by Edinburgh SC.

== History ==
The junction is constructed on the site of the original Edinburgh and Glasgow Railway Bo'ness Junction station, which was first opened on 21 February, 1842. The original station had two platforms on the E&G (upper) line. In 1856 a single platform was opened with the (lower) Slamannan and Borrowstounness Railway line, part of the Monkland Railways and connected to the Slamannan Railway. Trains going from Bo'ness to the E&GR (westbound) used a steeply graded curve which the modern trackbed shares which rose from the north-facing Bo'ness Low Junction up to the west-facing Bo'ness High Junction. To the west of the Bo'ness High Junction was the east-facing Coatbridge Line Junction which allowed trains from the Linlithgow direction to head southbound on the Monkland Railways.

The low-level station was closed in 1933. The upper station at Manuel survived until 1967 at which time the branch was cut back to Kinneil Colliery.

Preceding station	Heritage railways	Following station
Terminus	Bo'ness & Kinneil Railway	Birkhill towards Bo'ness
Historical railways
Causewayend; Line and station closed	North British Railway; Slamannan and Borrowstounness Railway	Kinneil; Line open as a heritage line, station closed
Linlithgow	North British Railway; Edinburgh and Glasgow Railway	Polmont

== Preservation ==
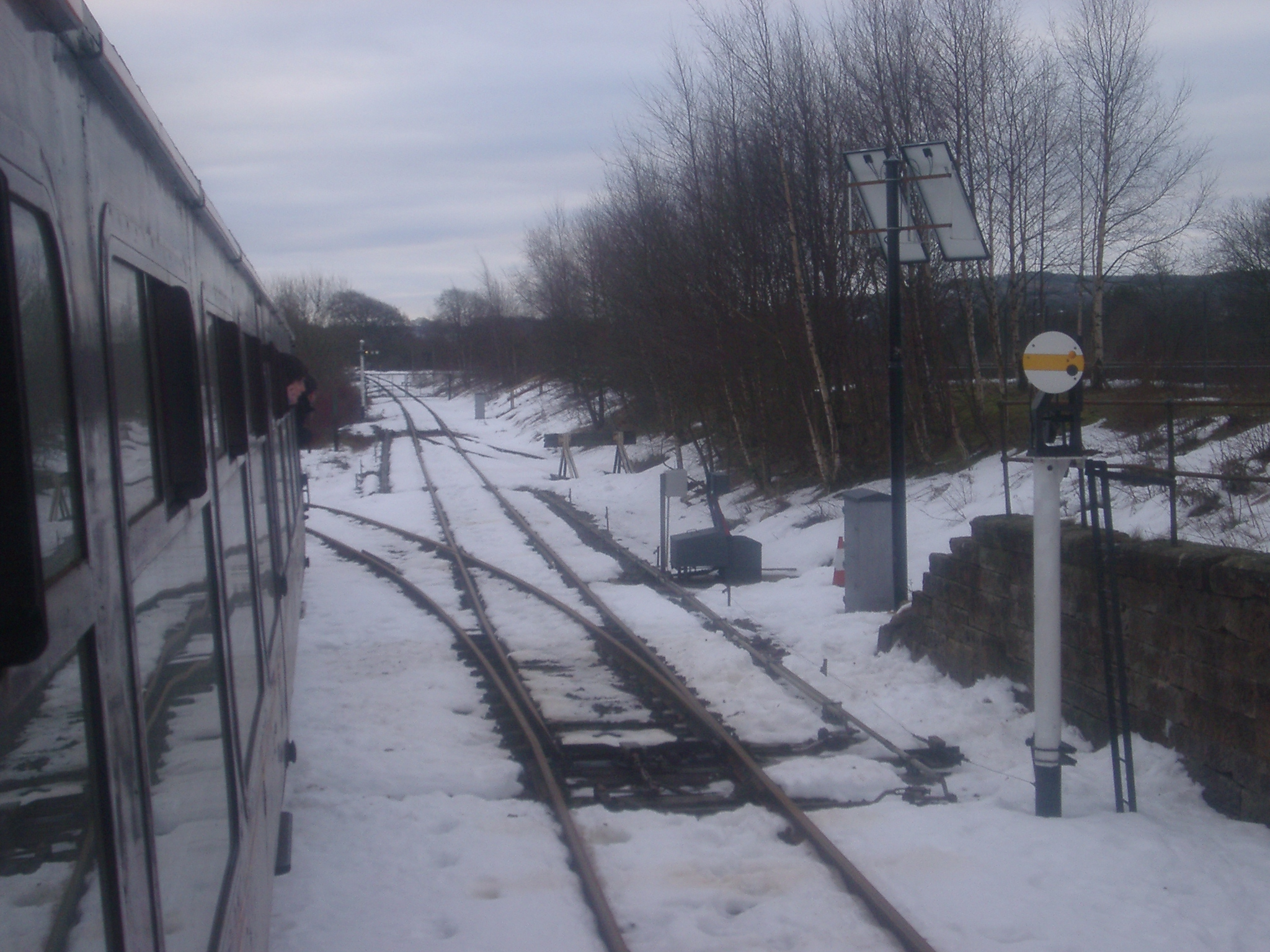
A view of the track layout controlled by Manuel Link Ground Frame leading to the mainline

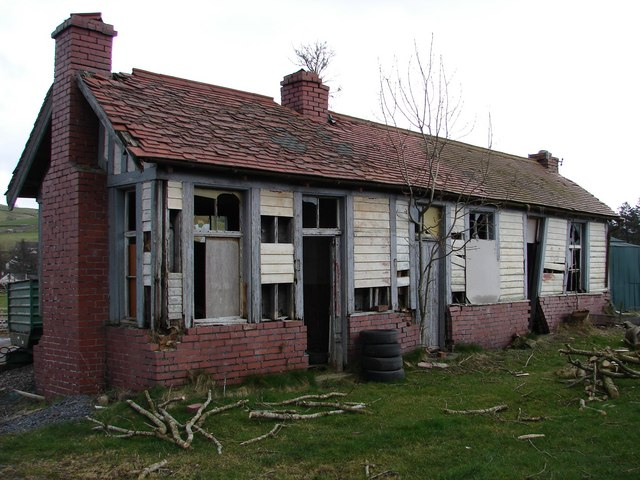
The old station building from Moniaive

The line to the junction was relaid in 1990 by British Rail with funding from Tesco PLC so that SRPS Railtours could relocate their base of operations and coaching stock to Bo'ness from its previous base at Perth which was too crowded. The current junction with Network Rail is east-facing.

There is now a platform at Manuel and passengers on the branch service can now be able to alight and disembark whilst the train waits for the locomotive to run-round each and every trip. The newly constructed platform finally opened (officially to the public) on 29 June 2013.

The old station building at Moniaive has been offered to the SRPS as a suitable structure for the site.

=== Track layout ===
Manuel's track layout features a long curving loop with a short headshunt at the west end. The link-line leaves the loop approximately 13 BR Mk1 coach lengths from the end of the headshunt. A small trap point is located some way up the link line and further up, a gate, signifying the edge of the SRPS's ground. On the approach to Manuel, a fixed distant signal is encountered shortly before the line curves and climbs steeply up to the junction itself. The points at the north-west end of the loop are controlled by a 3-lever ground frame known as Manuel North. The east-facing link line is controlled by a 5-lever ground frame which includes mechanical control of two signals: a raised yellow disc signal reads up the link line and up onto Network Rail and a small arm signal prevents moves onto the B&KR. The points at the west end are hand points. Both ground frames are controlled by the train staff using Annett's locks and all signals are tubular upper quadrant in design. The points at the Network Rail end of the link-line are controlled from a ground frame released from Edinburgh SC.
