= Caledonian Railway 439 Class =

Class of 0-4-4T steam locomotive

Caledonian Railway 0-4-4T
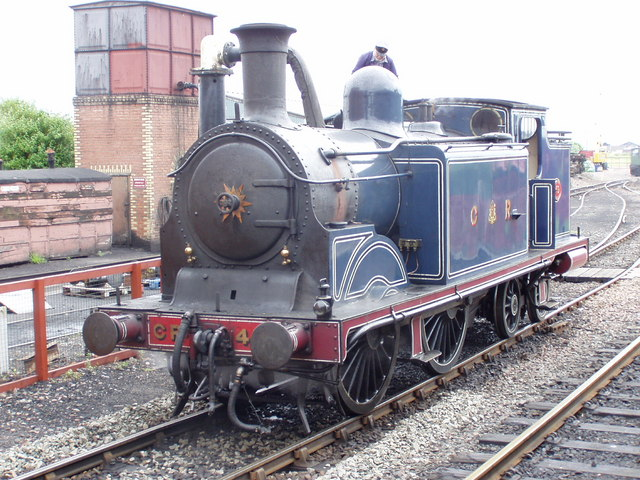
- 419 at Bo’ness
Type and origin
- Power type: Steam
- Designer: John F. McIntosh
- Build date: 1895–1925
- Total produced: 92
Specifications
- Configuration
  - Whyte: 0-4-4T
- Gauge: 4 ft 8 1/2 in (1,435 mm) standard gauge
- Driver dia.: 5 ft 9 in (1.753 m)
- Loco weight: 53 long tons 16 cwt (120,500 lb or 54.7 t) to 59 long tons 12 cwt (133,500 lb or 60.6 t)
- Fuel type: Coal
- Boiler pressure: 180 psi (1,200 kPa)
- Cylinders: Two, inside
- Cylinder size: 18 in × 26 in (457 mm × 660 mm) or 18 1/4 in × 26 in (464 mm × 660 mm)
Performance figures
- Tractive effort: 18,680 or 19,200 lbf (83.1 or 85.4 kN)
Career
- Class: CR: 439
- Power class: 2P
- Disposition: One preserved, remainder scrapped

The Caledonian Railway 439 Class is a class of 0-4-4T steam locomotive. It was a development of earlier Caledonian Railway 0-4-4T locomotives, including the 19 Class and 92 Class, and predecessor of the 431 Class. The 439 Class was introduced by John F. McIntosh in 1900 and a modified version was introduced by William Pickersgill in 1915.

== Introduction ==
92 engines were built between 1900 and 1925, 74 of which passed into British Railways ownership in 1948, renumbered 55159-55236 (with gaps).

== Earlier versions ==
- 19 Class Introduced 1895
- 92 Class Introduced 1897, developed from 29 Class 0-6-0T

The 19 and 92 Classes were originally fitted with condensing apparatus for use on Glasgow Central Low Level lines. Twenty-four of them passed into British Railways ownership and they were numbered 55119-55146 (with gaps).

== Later versions ==
In 1922 Pickersgill introduced the 431 Class with larger cylinders and a cast-iron front buffer beam for banking. This was possibly to move the centre of gravity forwards and put more weight on the driving wheels. However, it was unusual to use a large-wheeled 0-4-4T (rather than a small-wheeled 0-6-0T) for banking. The 431 Class was numbered 431–434 by the Caledonian, 15237–15240 by the LMS, and 55237–55240 by British Railways.

In 1925 the LMS introduced their own version of the 439 Class and these were numbered 55260–55269 by British Railways.

In the 431 and LMS classes, the cylinder bore was increased to 18 1/4 in (460 mm), increasing the tractive effort to 19,200 lbf (85,000 N).

== Preservation ==
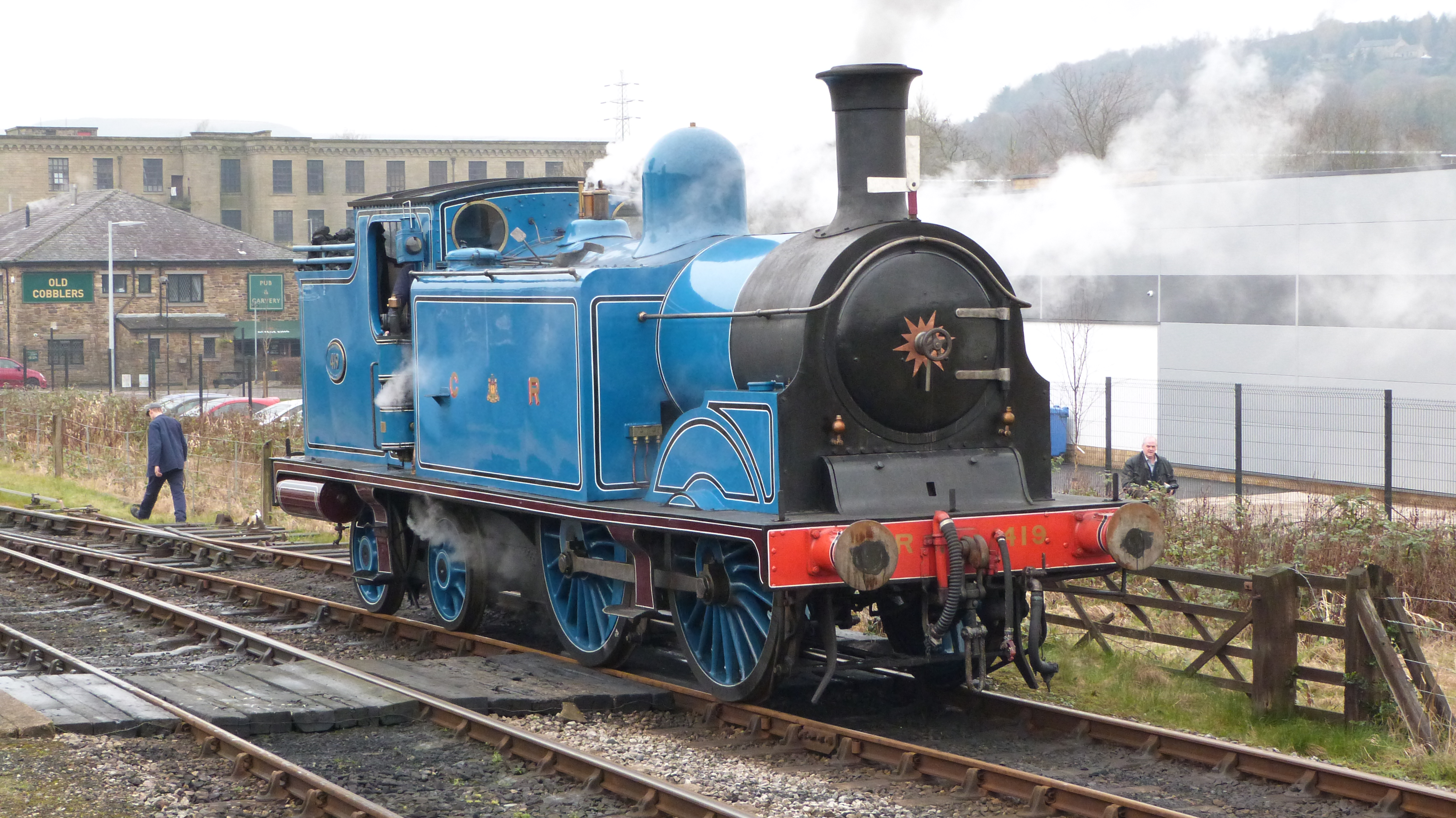
Caledonian Railway 419

One example, CR 419, (later LMS number 15189, BR 55189) has been preserved and is the flagship locomotive of the Scottish Railway Preservation Society.

== See also ==
- Caledonian Railway 0-4-4T
- Locomotives of the Caledonian Railway

== Sources ==
- Ian Allan ABC of British Railways Locomotives, 1948 edition, part 3, pages 45–46 and 1961 edition, part 3, page 54
