= John Lambie (engineer) =

Scottish engineer

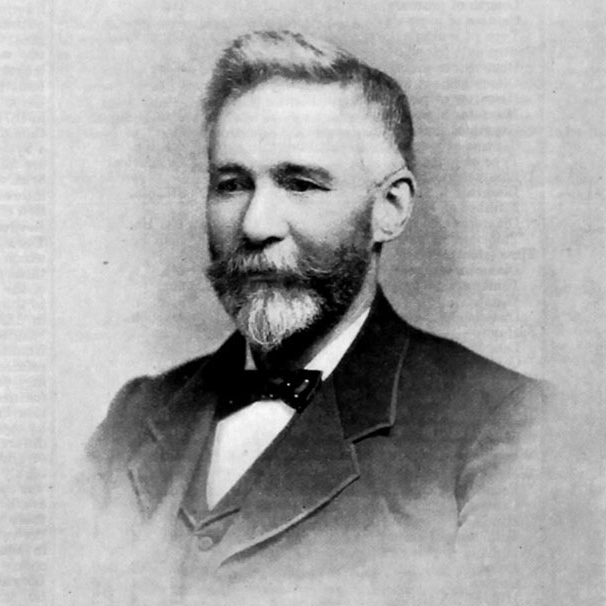
- Born: 29 October 1833; Saltcoats, Ayrshire
- Died: 1 February 1895 (aged 61); Glasgow
- Engineering career
- Discipline: Mechanical engineering

John Lambie was a Scottish engineer. He was born in Saltcoats, Ayrshire, on 29 October 1833 and died in Glasgow on 1 February 1895. He was Locomotive Superintendent of the Caledonian Railway from 1891 to 1895.

== Career ==
John Lambie became Locomotive Superintendent of the Caledonian Railway on 1 April 1891. He came from a railway background as his father had been Traffic Manager of the Wishaw and Coltness Railway until it was absorbed by the Caledonian Railway in 1848.

== Innovations ==
John Lambie improved conditions for enginemen by fitting cab doors, better handrails and footsteps to locomotives. He improved on Dugald Drummond's 4-4-0 design in 1894 and he introduced condensing steam locomotives of the 4-4-0T and 0-4-4T types for underground lines.

== See also ==
- Locomotives of the Caledonian Railway
- Locomotives of the London, Midland and Scottish Railway

Business positions
Preceded by Hugh Smellie	Locomotive Superintendent of the Caledonian Railway; 1891-1895	Succeeded by John F. McIntosh
