= British Rail Class 126 =

British diesel multiple unit train

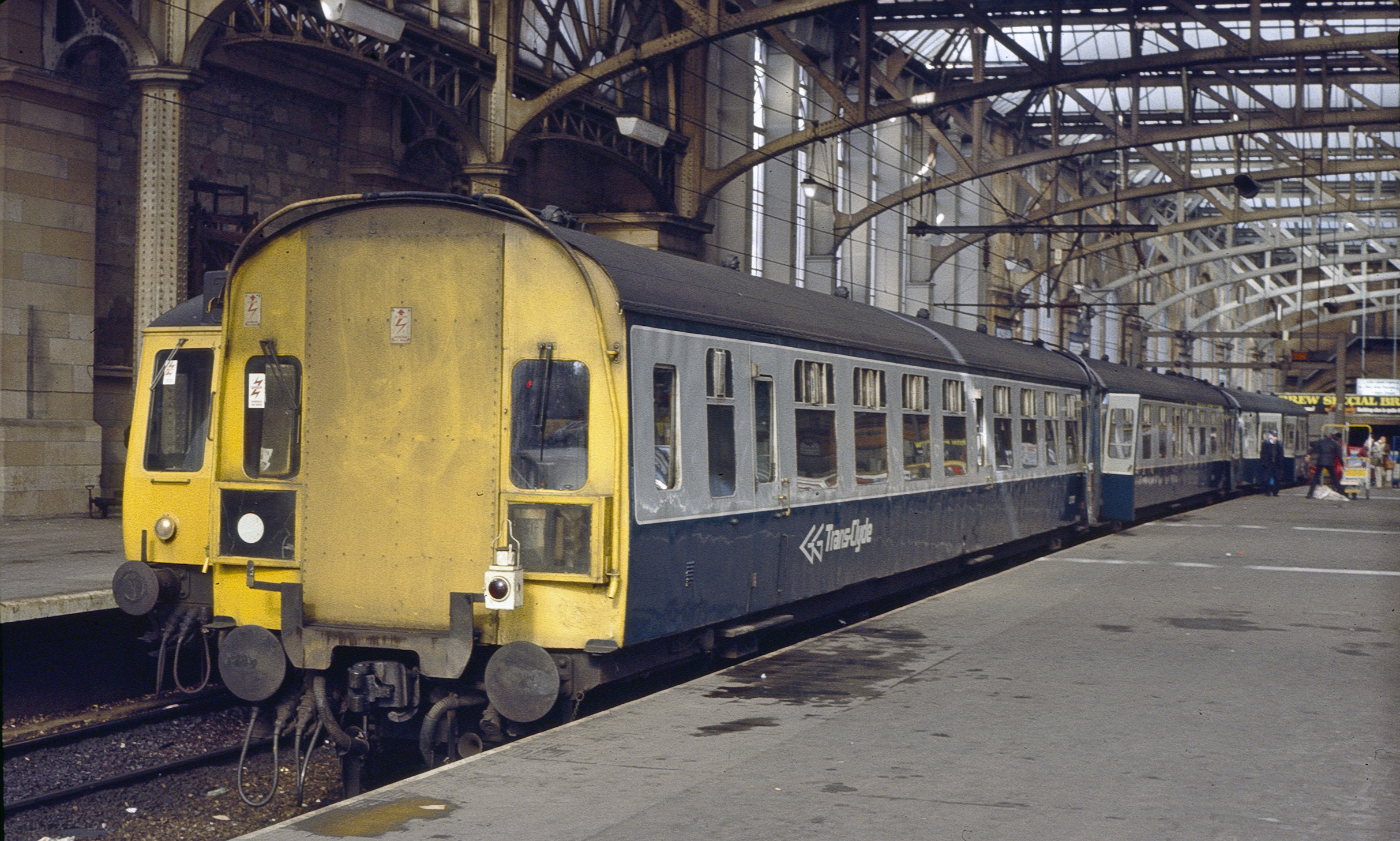
- The blanked-off gangway end of a Class 126 at Glasgow Central in 1982
- In service: 1959–1983
- Manufacturer: BR
- Built at: Swindon Works
- Family name: First generation
- Replaced: Steam locomotives and carriages
- Constructed: 1959–1960
- Entered service: 1959
- Number built: 132 vehicles
- Number preserved: 4 vehicles
- Formation: 3-car
- Operator: British Rail
- Depot: Ayr
- Line served: Glasgow - Ayr - Girvan - Stranraer

Specifications
- Car body construction: Steel
- Car length: 64 ft 6 in (19.66 m)
- Width: 9 ft 3 in (2.82 m)
- Height: 12 ft 9 1/2 in (3.899 m)
- Doors: Slam
- Maximum speed: 70 mph (113 km/h)
- Weight: 38 long tons (39 t; 43 short tons)
- Prime movers: 150-horsepower (110 kW) BUT (AEC), 2 per power car
- Cylinder count: 6
- Power output: 300 hp (220 kW)
- Transmission: 4 speed mechanical
- Multiple working: White Circle
- Track gauge: 4 ft 8 1/2 in (1,435 mm)

The British Rail Class 126 diesel multiple unit was built by BR Swindon Works in 1959/60 to work services from Glasgow to Ayrshire and comprised 22 3-car sets and were a development of the earlier Swindon-built trainsets that had been introduced in 1955 to work the Edinburgh Waverley - Glasgow Queen St services. These vehicles formed the first Inter City service to be operated by diesel units in Great Britain.

The introduction of these early diesel multiple units originated in a British Transport Commission report of 1952 that suggested the trial use of diesel railcars. BR's Swindon Works were chosen to design and build express units for the ex-North British Railway Edinburgh Waverley to Glasgow Queen Street route.

== Description ==
The cars were of integral steel construction using the bodywork as a stressed member, as opposed to the contemporary Mk1 coach design which relied on the strength of a trussed underframe. The design featured Pullman gangways and buckeye couplings.

Each of the two power cars was fitted with two AEC 150 hp underfloor engines with mechanical transmission giving a maximum speed of 70 mph. Initially termed "Inter-urban", this was soon changed to "Inter-City" long before that branding was used for mainline express services. The type was intended for longer distance services and a number of buffet vehicles were included in the orders. One of the buffet vehicles survives in preservation.

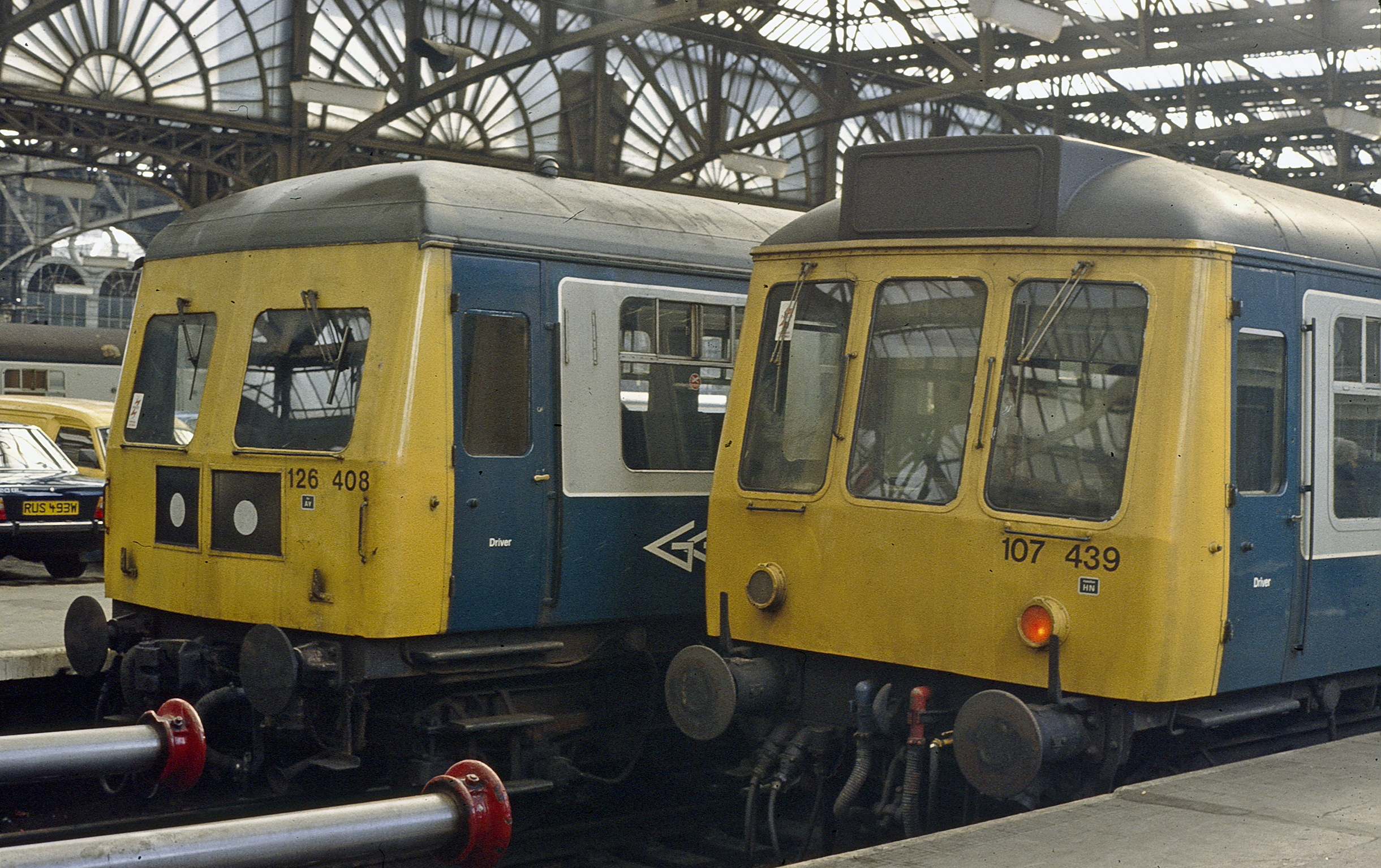
The non-gangwayed end of a Class 126 (left) next to a Class 107

These trains had two completely different front-end designs: either a full-width cab or a half-cab with central gangway connection. The latter "intermediate" driving car allowed through access within a six-car set. Neither end featured any destination blinds or marker lights, only a box holding a stencil indicating the train classification (A, B or C; later changed to 1, 2 or 3).

== Operations ==
The 1970s saw the first class accommodation downgraded. Being of a non-standard design, the class was not included in the DMU refurbishment programme and so remained in close-to-original condition. The main alteration was the plating over of the outer gangway connection on the DMS vehicles in 1979–81, following drivers' complaints of draughts.

== Post-BR use ==
Five of the ex-E&G leading power cars were overhauled and exported to Liberia for use by LAMCO mining company for staff trains.

BR Number	LAMCO Number
79091	91
79093	93
79094	94
79096	96
79097	97

== Preservation ==
Four vehicles (51017, 51043, 59404 from the Ayrshire build & 79443 from the Edinburgh to Glasgow sets) survive in preservation, owned by the Scottish Railway Preservation Society and based at the Bo'ness and Kinneil Railway. The three Ayrshire vehicles have been completely overhauled inside and out with the assistance of the Heritage Lottery Fund and are currently in early DMU Green livery.

A buffet car from the earlier batch (79443) is currently undergoing complete restoration.
