= Museum of Scottish Railways =

Coordinates: 56.0185°N 3.5989°W

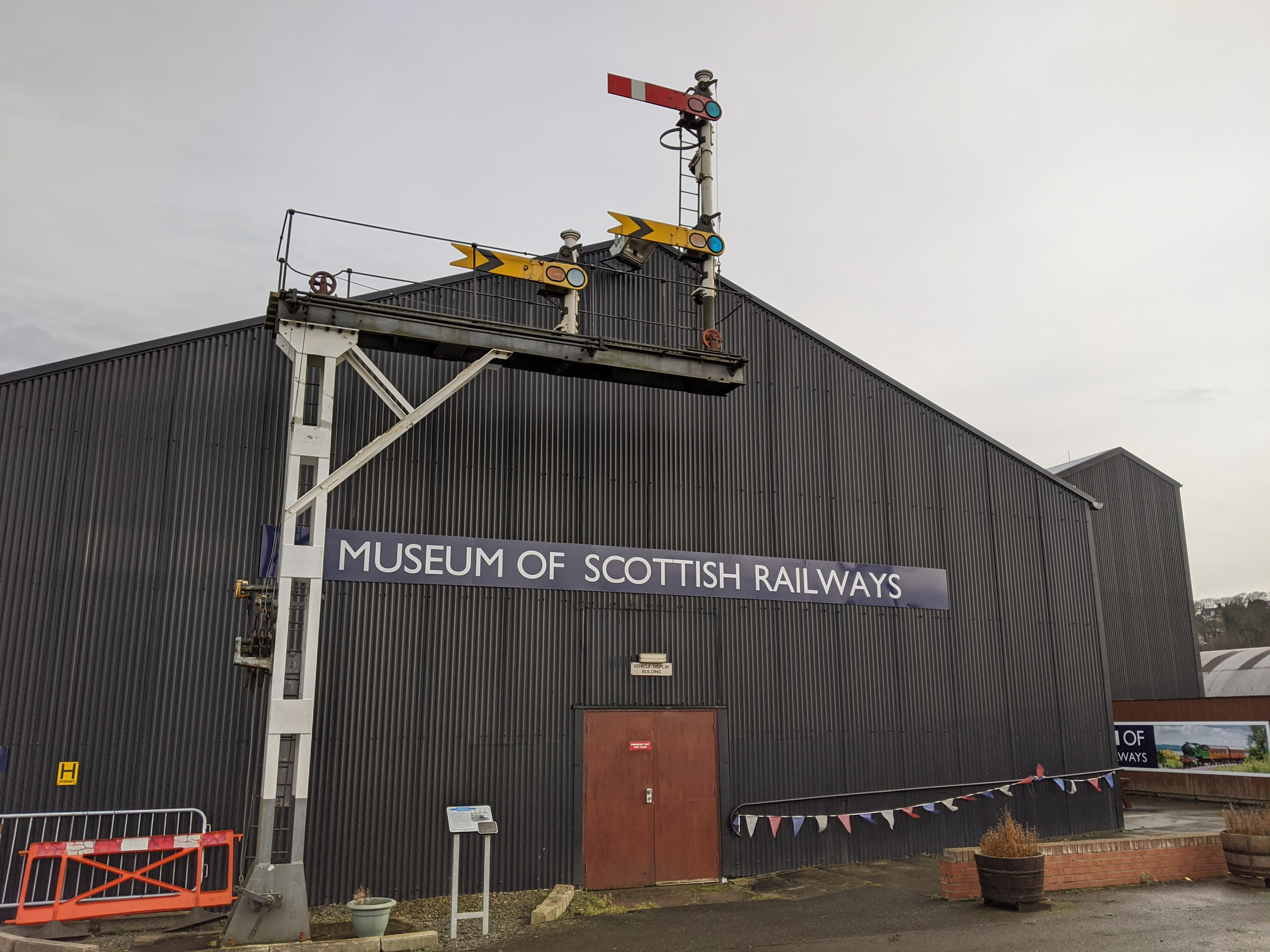
- Established: 1995
- Location: Bo'ness, Scotland
- Type: Transport Museum
- Website: museumofscottishrailways.org.uk

The Museum of Scottish Railways is a railway museum operated by the Scottish Railway Preservation Society (SRPS). It is based on the SRPS's large collection of railway artefacts from across Scotland. The museum is located at the Bo'ness and Kinneil Railway, and is the largest building on site.

It is the largest railway museum in Scotland, consisting of three large buildings which contain heritage locomotives, coaches, wagons and other exhibits.

== Collections ==
The Museum of Scottish Railways collection ranges from large locomotives, carriages, sleeping cars, wagons and signalling systems as well as smaller objects including oil cans, crockery, books and photographs. The core collection is a Recognised Collection of National Significance.

== Rolling stock ==
Rolling stock collections are anything (such a locomotives or carriages) which move on rails.

=== Locomotives ===
Class	Number & name	Type	Status	Livery	Built	Image
3 ft gauge Andrew Barclay Sons & Co. 0-4-0T	Fair Maid of Foyer	Steam	On static display	Green	1899	
NBR G Class (LNER Y9 Class) 0-4-0ST	No. 42 (68095)	Steam	On static display	NBR Brown/Green	1887	
North British Railway Class C (LNER Class J36) 0-6-0	No. 673 (65243) Maude	Steam	On static display	BR Black	1891	
Great North of Scotland Railway Class F (LNER Class D40) 4-4-0	No. 49 (62277) Gordon Highlander	Steam	On static display. On loan from Riverside Museum.	GNSR Green	1920	
North Metropolitan Power Station Co. 0-6-0F	Lord Ashford	Steam - Fireless	On static display	North Metropolitan Power Station Co.	1931	
English Electric Type 3b	No. 1131	Electric	On static display	Fairfield Blue	1940	
British Rail Class 91	91131	Electric	On static display	LNER ex Virgin Trains East Coast	1991	

==== Coaches ====
Type	Number	Status	Livery/Operator	Image
Duke of Sutherland’s Saloon	10168	On Static Display	Highland Railway	
NBR Invalid Saloon	461	On Static Display	North British Railway	
LNER Gresley Buffet Car	644	Not on Display.	London and North Eastern Railway	
LNER Gresley Sleeper	178	On Static Display	BR Blue-Grey	
British Rail Mark 1 Post Office Sorting	80382	On Static Display	Royal Mail	
British Rail Mark 3 Sleeper	10580	On Static Display	Caledonian Sleeper	
First Generation Glasgow Subway rolling stock	No. 55	On Static Display	Glasgow Corporation Transport Red and Cream	

== Location ==
The Museum of Scottish Railways is located behind Bo'ness Station which is on the Bo'ness and Kinneil Railway branch line. The line is now operated by the Scottish Railway Preservation Society. The branch line, and museum, sit near the historic Bo'ness Harbour and are on National Cycle Route 76.
