= Linlithgow railway station =

Railway station in West Lothian, Scotland

Linlithgow Scottish Gaelic: Gleann Iucha
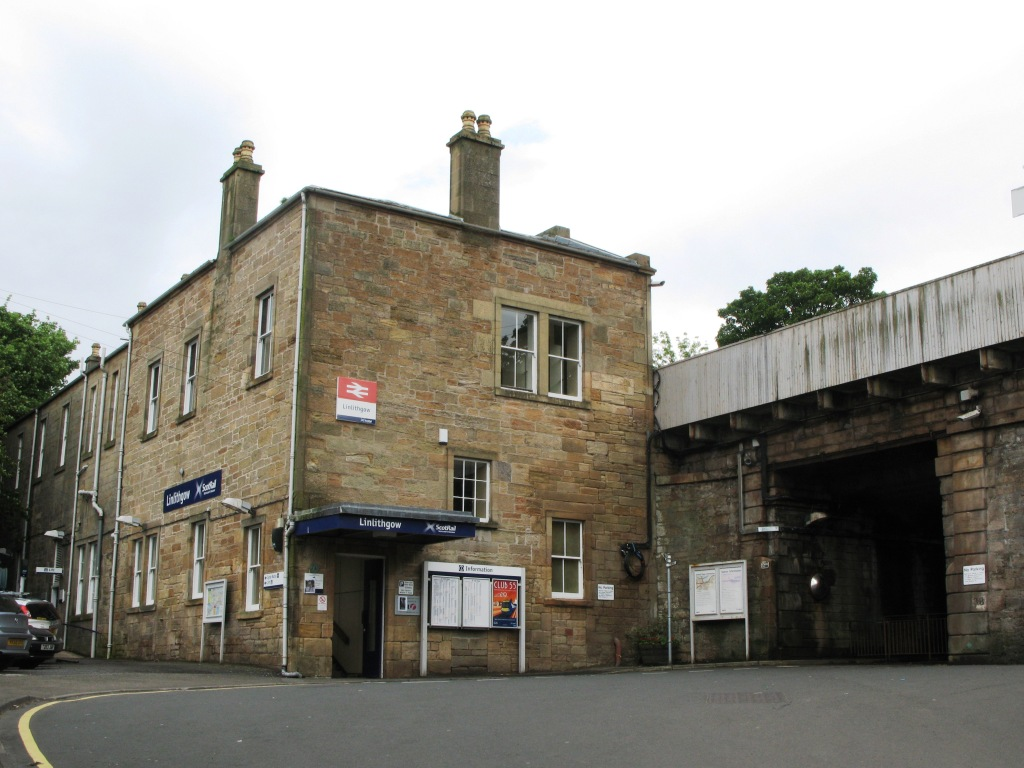

General information
- Location: Linlithgow, West Lothian; Scotland
- Coordinates: 55.9764°N 3.5957°W
- Grid reference: NT005770
- Manager: ScotRail
- Platforms: 2

Other information
- Station code: LIN

History
- Original company: Edinburgh and Glasgow Railway
- Pre-grouping: North British Railway
- Post-grouping: London and North Eastern Railway

Key dates
- 21 February 1842: Opened

Passengers
- 2020/21: ▼0.120 million
- 2021/22: ▲0.519 million
- 2022/23: ▲0.798 million
- 2023/24: ▲0.990 million
- 2024/25: ▲1.059 million

Listed Building – Category C(S)
- Designated: 16 March 1992
- Reference no.: LB37472
Location
Notes
- Passenger statistics from the Office of Rail and Road

Linlithgow railway station is a railway station serving the town of Linlithgow in West Lothian, Scotland. It is located on the Glasgow to Edinburgh via Falkirk Line, and is also served by ScotRail services from Edinburgh Waverley to Dunblane.

== History ==
Linlithgow station was opened by the Edinburgh and Glasgow Railway on 21 February 1842. It once featured an east-facing bay platform and a small goods yard, where the carpark is today. The station also had a railway hotel, the Star and Garter, which was involved in a devastating fire in October 2010.

Photographs of the station taken in 1845 are believed to be the oldest photographic images of a railway subject anywhere in the world.

The building is Category C listed by Historic Scotland due to it being one of the only two surviving stations (with Croy) of the original Edinburgh and Glasgow Railway.

== Services ==
The Edinburgh to Dunblane service calls here half-hourly, except on Sundays where one train an hour terminates at Stirling instead.

Linlithgow also receives a half-hourly service Monday-Friday and Sunday between Edinburgh and Glasgow, whilst operating every 15 minutes during the Monday-Friday peak and also on Saturdays.

A limited number of Sunday services start or terminate at Perth, running via Stirling and Gleneagles.

Preceding station	National Rail	Following station
Haymarket	ScotRail; Glasgow–Edinburgh via Falkirk line	Polmont
Edinburgh Park	ScotRail; Edinburgh–Dunblane line	Polmont
	Historical railways	
Philpstoun; Line open, station closed	North British Railway; Edinburgh and Glasgow Railway	Manuel High Level; Line open, station closed

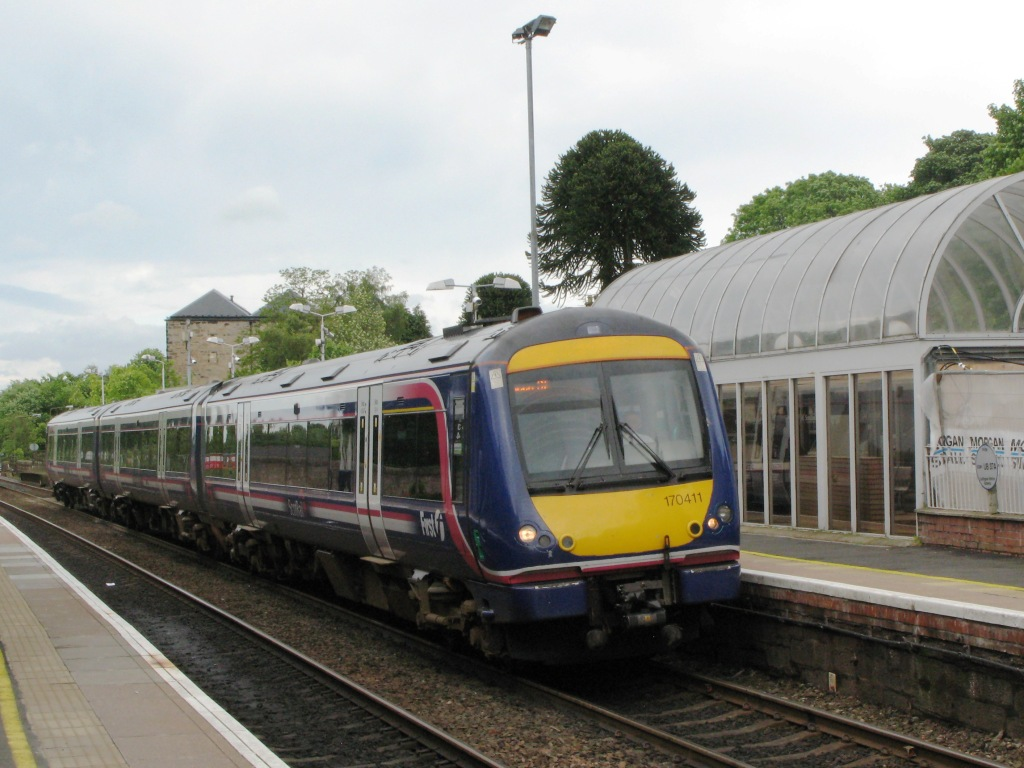
A Class 170 working an Edinburgh to Glasgow service. Taken prior to electrification works

== Electrification ==
As part of the Edinburgh to Glasgow Improvement Programme, the line through the station has been electrified and the platforms extended.

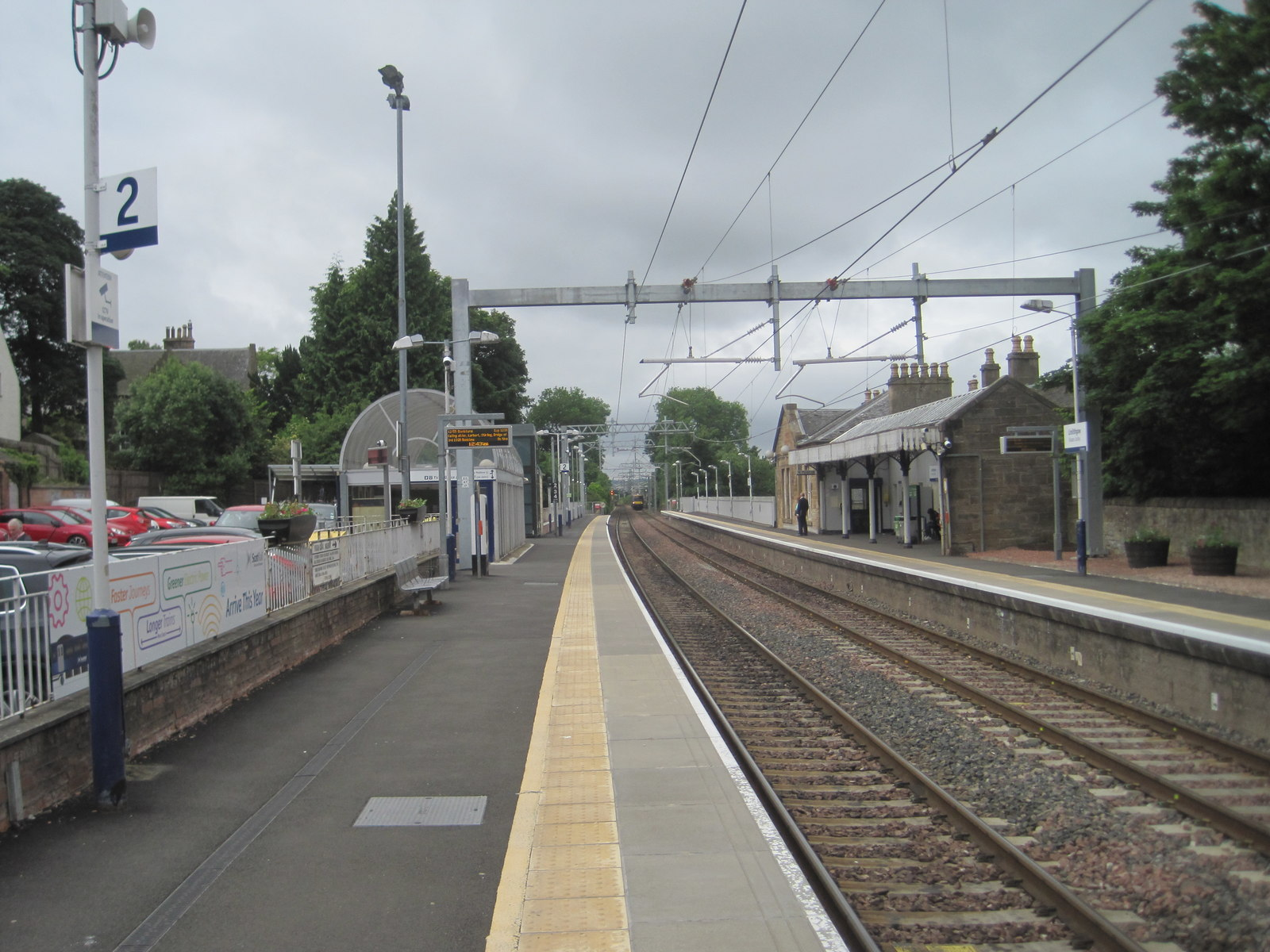
Linlithgow station in 2018, following electrification of the line
