= Bo'ness and Kinneil Railway =

Heritage railway line in Scotland

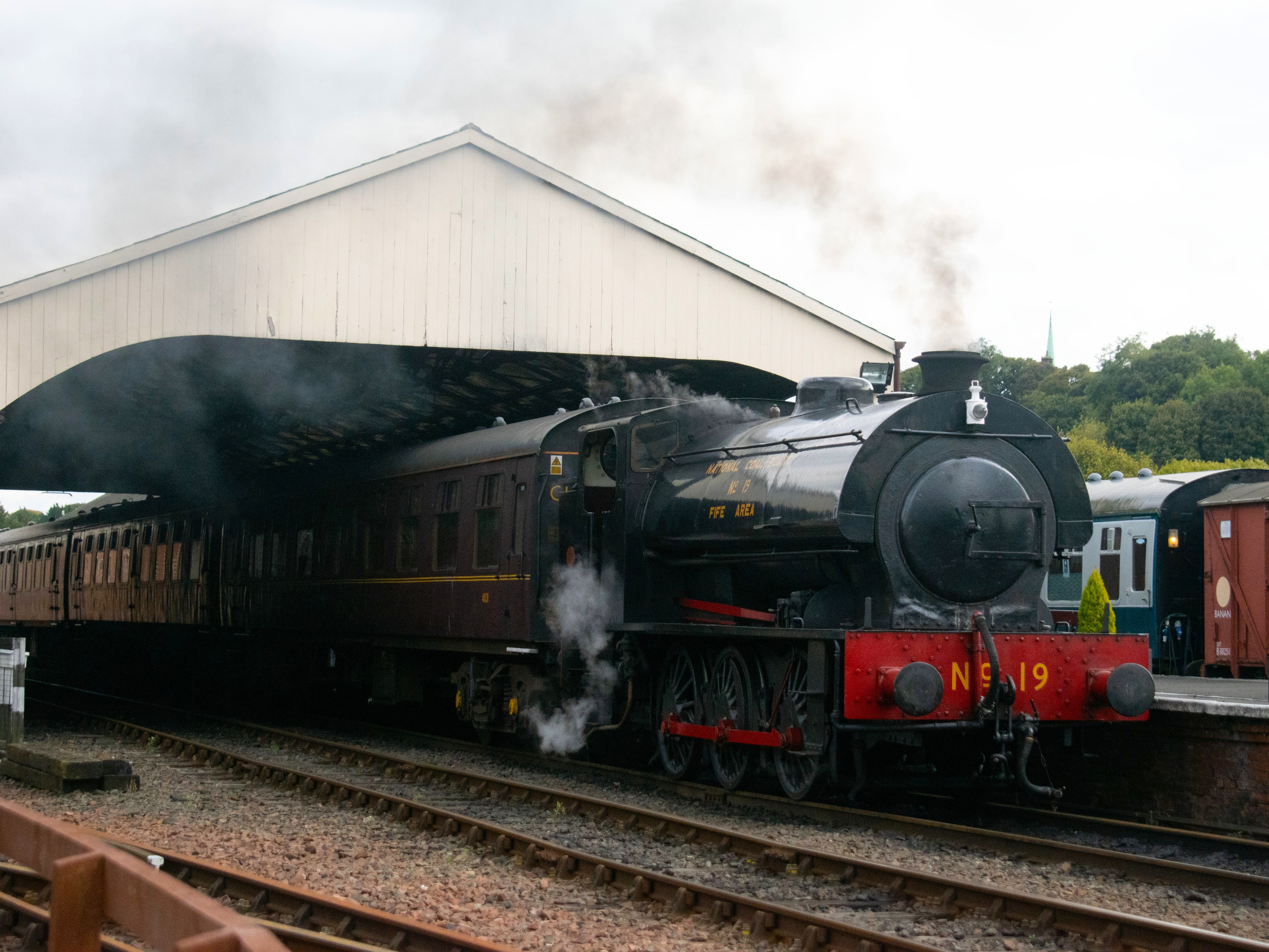
No.19 Awaiting Departure at Bo'ness

The Bo’ness and Kinneil Railway is a heritage railway in Bo'ness, Scotland. It is operated by the Scottish Railway Preservation Society (SRPS), a registered charity, and operates a total of over 5 miles (8 km) of track (between Bo'ness and Manuel Junction, via Kinneil and Birkhill), virtually the entire Slamannan and Borrowstounness Railway that became part of the former North British Railway on the Firth of Forth.

== Stations ==
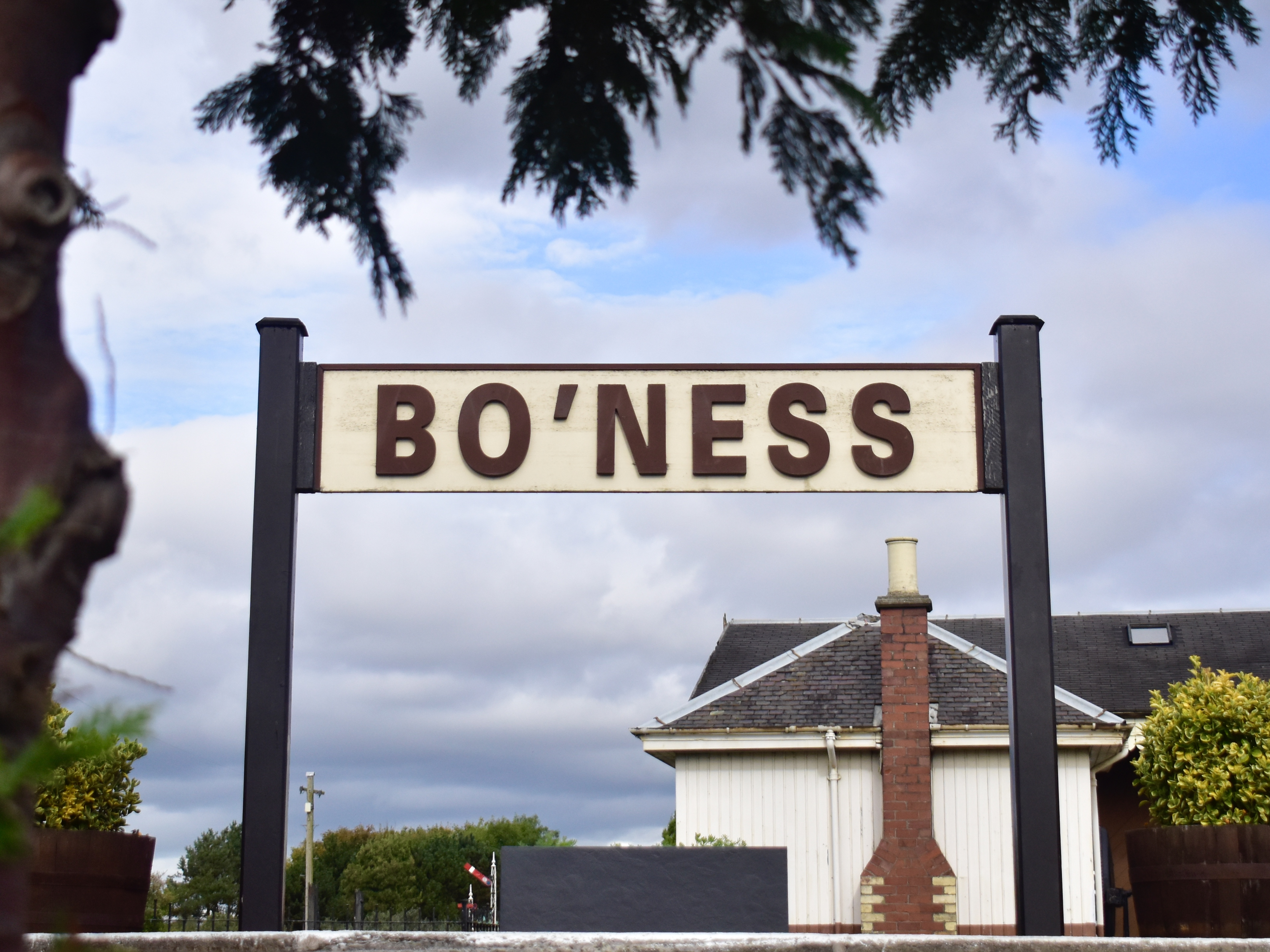
Bo'ness Station Sign

The Bo'ness and Kinneil Railway has four stations: Bo'ness, Kinneil Halt, Birkhill and Manuel.

== Museum of Scottish Railways ==
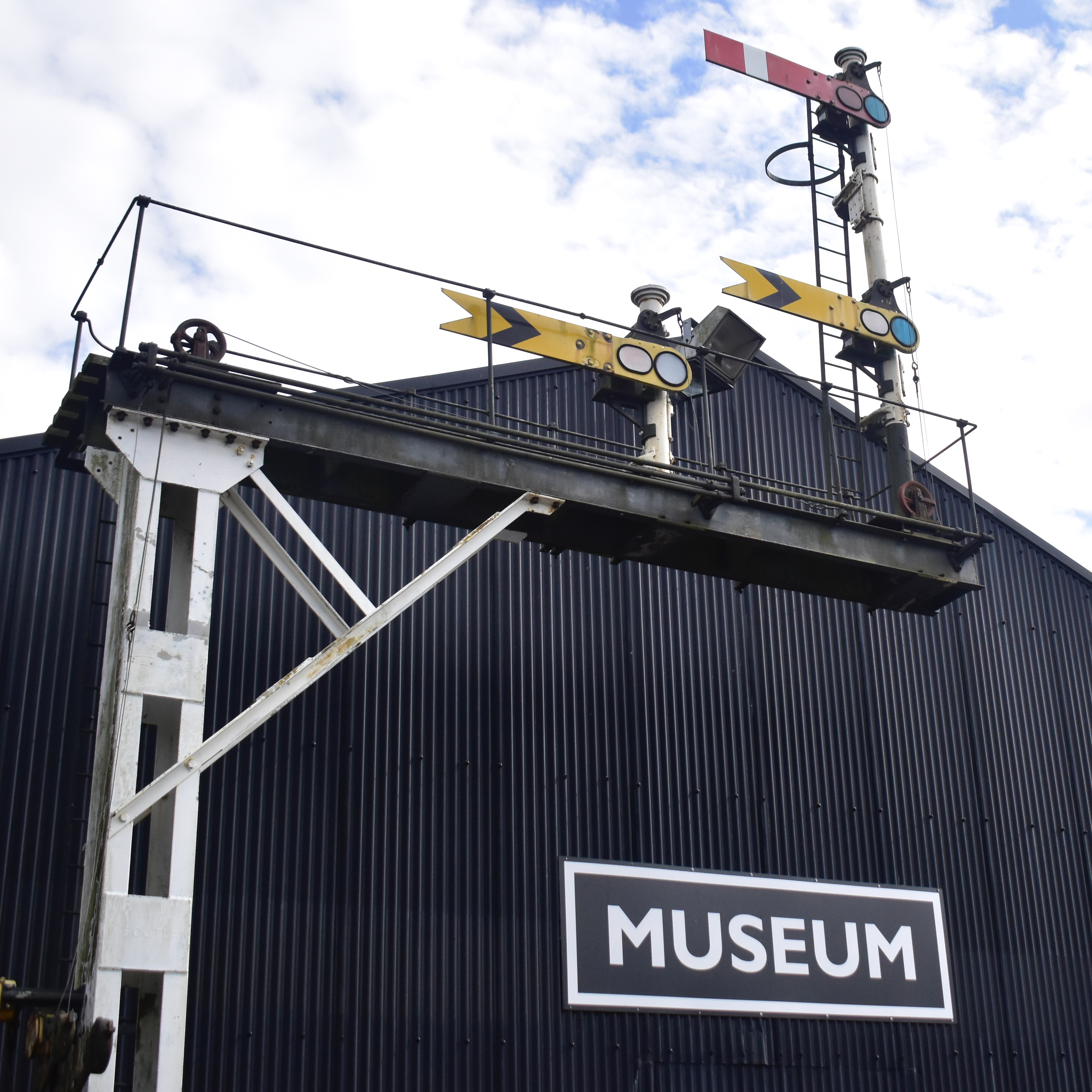
Museum of Scottish Railways building

The Bo'ness and Kinneil Railway is also the home of the Museum of Scottish Railways. The Museum is located on the opposite side of the line from Bo'ness station, and entry is paid separately.

== Model railway ==
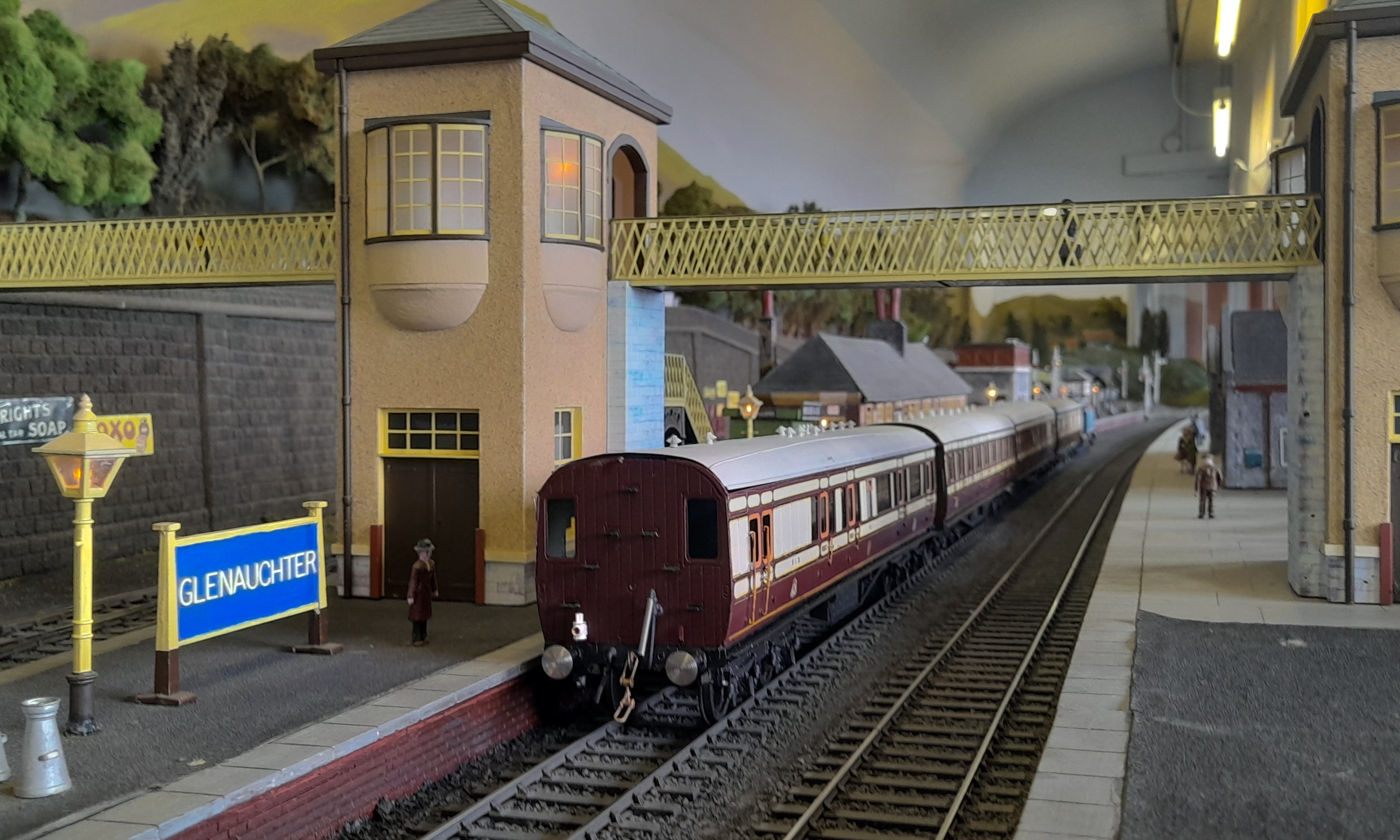
Glenauchter model railway station

Operated by the Bo'ness Gauge O Group, the model railway operates alongside the full-size railway between Easter and December. It is free to enter for visitors but donations are accepted. It is housed inside two Norwegian Railway coaches with the 'viewing coach' open to the public and the 'fiddle yard' coach for staff only.

== Rolling stock ==
=== Steam locomotives ===
Most of the steam fleet have had major industrial careers in Scotland, but a few ex-mainline types are also in service.

Type	Number & name	Status	Livery	Notes	Photograph
Neilson Reid 1899 0-6-0T	No. 1 "Lord Roberts"	Operational	Coltness Ironworks Blue	Used for Days Out With Thomas. Returned to service 13 May 2017.	
Hunslet Austerity 0-6-0ST	No. 5	Out of Service	N/A	There are no plans to restore this locomotive to operational condition in the foreseeable future.	
Andrew Barclay 1942 0-4-0TC	No. 6	Out of Service	NCB Green		
Hawthorn, Leslie 0-4-0ST	No.24 "Lord King"	Out of Service	NWR Green	Formerly used for Days Out With Thomas.	
Hunslet Austerity 0-6-0ST	No. 7	Out of Service. Undergoing overhaul	Under Repaint	The intention was to return the locomotive to service with a new 10 year boiler ticket in 2022.	
Hunslet Austerity 0-6-0ST	No. 19	Out of Service	NCB Blue & Yellow	Recently repainted into the striking NCB Blue & Yellow livery. Returned to service in March 2015 following overhaul. Boiler ticket expires in 2025.	
Andrew Barclay 1939 0-6-0T	No. 20	Out of Service	N/A	Under overhaul, Restoration started in Spring 2019 with the stripping of components.	
Caledonian Railway 439 Class 0-4-4T	No. 15189	Operational	LMS Crimson	Returned to traffic in the middle of October 2018 after an absence of 9 1/2 years.	Taken at Bo'ness
LNER Class D49 4-4-0	No. 62712 "Morayshire"	Out of Service	Under Repaint	The only LNER D49 left in the world. Under overhaul.	
LMS Stanier Class 8F 2-8-0	No. 45170 "Sir William McAlpine"	Out of Service	N/A	Repatriated from Sivas in November 2010. Arrived at Bo'ness in November 2014 and currently awaiting restoration to working order, tender now being overhauled in the running shed.	

- BR Standard Class 4 2-6-4T no. 80105 was formerly based at the railway but moved to the Strathspey Railway in May 2026 for overhaul under a 'repair-and-run' agreement.

=== Diesels ===
Former main-line diesel locomotives are abundant at the Bo'ness & Kinneil Railway, and a Summer and Winter Diesel Gala are held each year.

Class	Number & Name	Status	Livery	Notes	Photograph
Ruston and Hornsby 1951 4w 0-4-0	P6687	Operational	Green		
British Rail Class D2/10	D2767	Operational	BR Green	Came back into service in 2025	
British Rail Class 08	08443/D3558	Operational	BR Green	Came back into service in 2025	
British Rail Class 20	20020	Out of Service	BR Blue		
British Rail Class 25	25235	Out of Service. Undergoing overhaul	BR Blue		
British Rail Class 26	26038 "Tom Clift"	Operational	BR Blue		
British Rail Class 26	26024	Out of Service	BR Blue		
British Rail Class 27	27005/D5351	Out of Service. Undergoing overhaul	Under Repaint		
British Rail Class 37	37025 "Inverness TMD"	Operational and Mainline certified	BR Large Logo	Owned by the Scottish 37 Group, Next in line for an Overhaul	
British Rail Class 37	37214	Spares Donor	BR Blue	Owned by the Scottish 37 Group. Repainted into BR Blue in late 2024.	
British Rail Class 37	37261 "Caithness"	Out of Service	Debranded DRS Compass	Owned by the Scottish 37 Group	
British Rail Class 37	37403 "Isle of Mull"	Operational and Mainline certified	BR Large Logo	Often goes out on the Mainline for SRPS Railtours.	
British Rail Class 47	47643	Currently Out of Service. Undergoing overhaul	Scotrail Executive Red-Stripe		

=== Multiple units ===
Type	Power	Number & name	Current status	Livery	Notes	Photograph
British Rail Class 117	DMU Diesel	Set L425, (51363, 59510, 51405). And 51372 for spares.	Operational	BR Green with speed whiskers (51372 in BR Blue)	Purchased from the Cotswold Diesel Railcar Group in 2024.	
British Rail Class 126	DMU Diesel	(formed of 51017, 59404, 79443, 51043)	Out of Service. Undergoing overhaul	BR Green with speed whiskers	79443 is undergoing a heavy body restoration.	
British Rail Class 303	EMU Electric	303032 (formed of 75597, 61503, 75602)	Out of Service	Strathclyde Orange and Black (61503 in Carmine/Cream)	61503 was taken from unit 023 after 032's MBSO was damaged during its stay at Immingham docks.	

== See also ==
- Scottish Railway Preservation Society
- Museum of Scottish Railways
- List of British heritage and private railways
- List of closed railway lines in Great Britain
