= Caledonian Railway 0-4-4T =

Steam locomotives built in Scotland

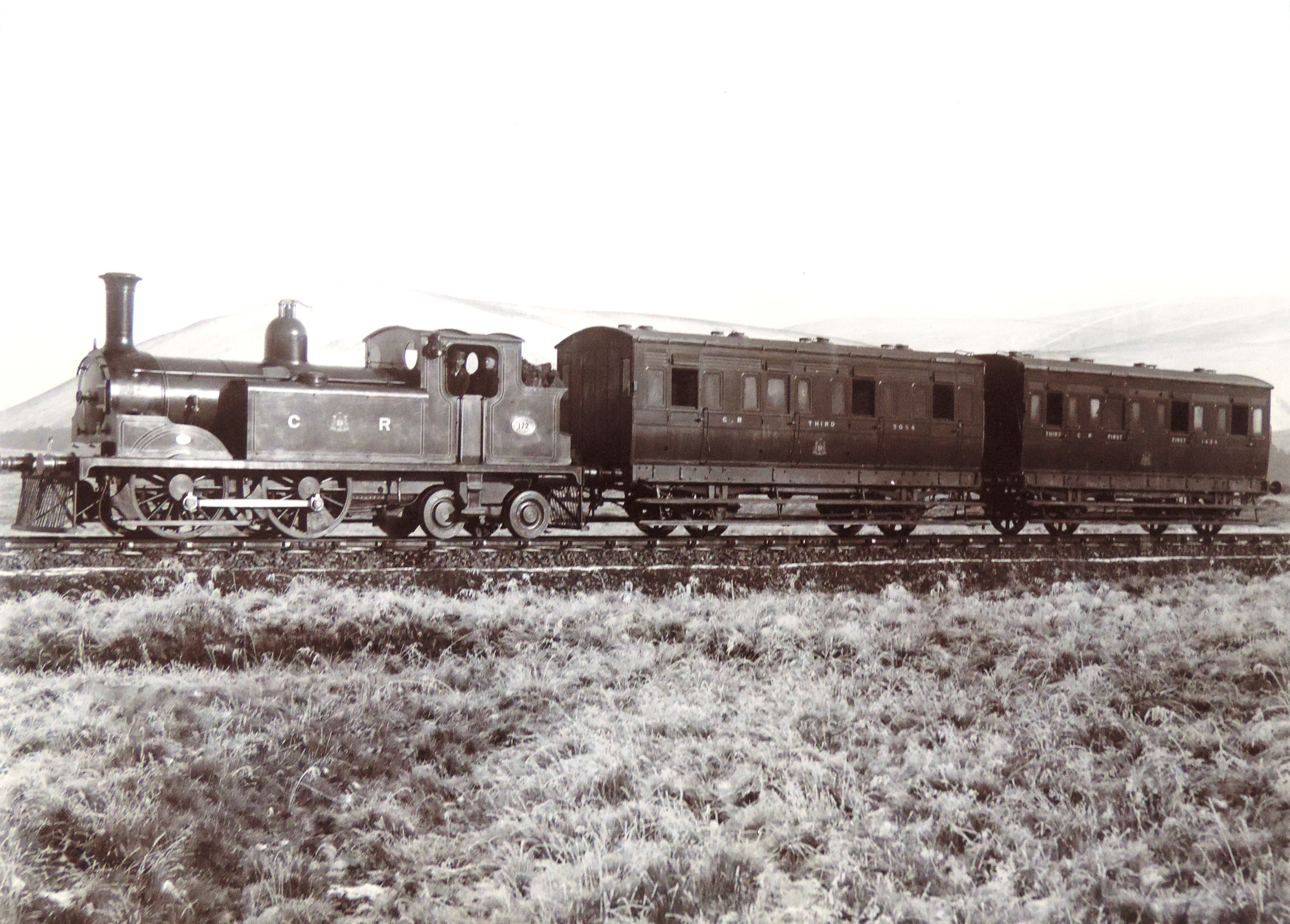
No. 172 with Cowcatcher

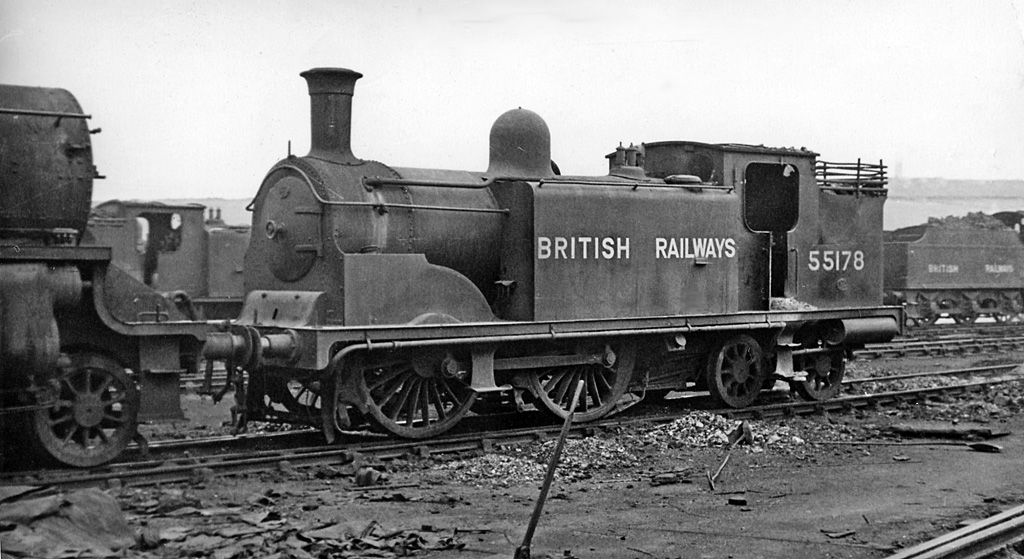
Ex-Caledonian Railway 0-4-4T no. 55178 at Balornock (St Rollox) Locomotive Depot in 1948

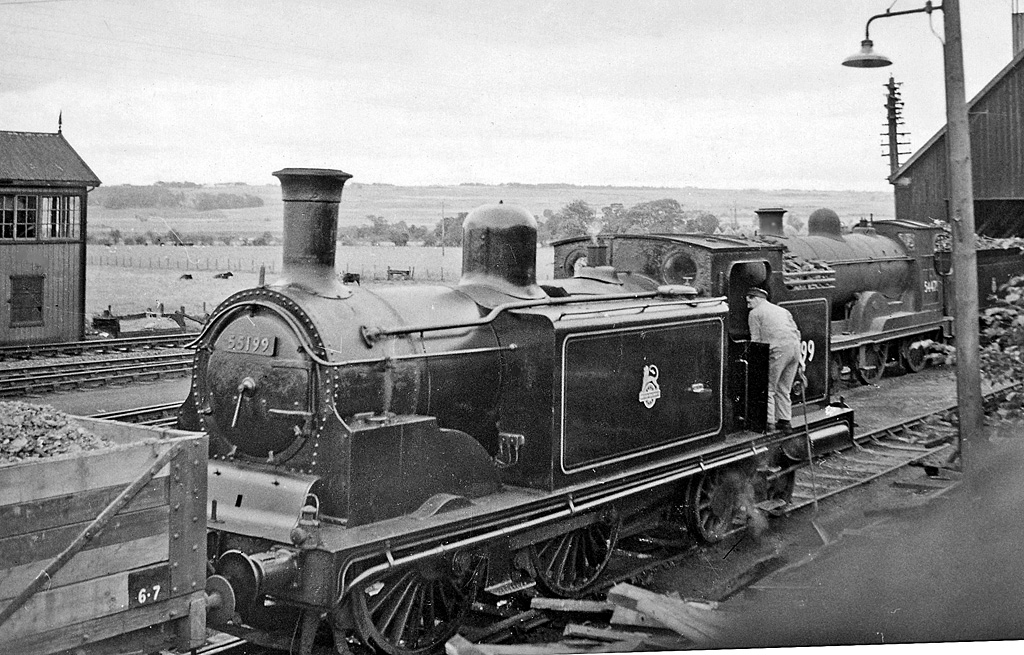
Ex-Caledonian Railway 0-4-4T no. 55199 at Dingwall Locomotive Depot in 1957

Caledonian Railway 0-4-4T steam locomotives were built for the Caledonian Railway, in Scotland, over many years. Most survived into London, Midland and Scottish Railway (LMS) ownership in 1923 and some into British Railways (BR) ownership in 1948. Designers included Dugald Drummond, John Lambie, John F. McIntosh and William Pickersgill. A development of the Pickersgill design was introduced by the LMS in 1925.

== Benjamin Connor ==
488 Class, 4 built 1873–74

- Original CR numbers 488–491; subsequently 167–170 (1881), 167A–170A (1899), 1350–3 (1899–1900), 1167–9 (1900)
- Withdrawn 1900–13.

== Dugald Drummond ==
171 Class, 24 built 1884–1891

- Built at St Rollox Works to orders SN (12), Y19 (6) and Y26 (6)
- CR numbers 171–8, 228–231, 222–7, 189–194; numbers increased by 1000 between 1912 and 1922, except for no. 190.
- Nine withdrawn 1917–23; remainder allotted LMS numbers 15100–15114 of which only 15103/4/7/8/10/4 were actually renumbered. All withdrawn by 1944.

== John Lambie ==
19 Class, 10 built 1895

- Built at St Rollox Works to order Y40
- CR numbers 19–28
- LMS numbers 15115–15124
- BR numbers 55119 and 55121–55124 (three had been withdrawn before 1948)

== John F. McIntosh ==
92 Class, 12 built 1897

- Built at St Rollox Works to order Y48
- CR numbers 13–18, 98–103
- LMS numbers 15125–15136
- BR numbers 55125–55127, 55129, 55130, 55132–55136 (two withdrawn before 1948)

104 Balerno Class, 12 built 1899

- Built at St Rollox Works to order Y56
- CR numbers 104–111, 167–170
- LMS numbers 15147–15158 (all withdrawn by 1938)

879 Class, 10 built 1900

- Built at St Rollox Works to orders Y59 (8) and Y60 (2)
- CR numbers 879–886, 437–438
- LMS numbers 15137–15146
- BR numbers 55138–55146 (55137 withdrawn before 1948)

439 Class, 68 built 1900–1914

- Built at St Rollox Works to orders Y61 (5), Y64 (12), Y77 (3), Y78 (9), Y84 (5), Y90 (10), Y94 (4), Y96 (6), Y102 (4), Y106 (4), Y110 (3) and Y114 (3)
- CR numbers 439–455, 151, 423, 473, 112, 125, 424, 463–466, 660, 666, 158, 419, 422, 429, 470, 126–127, 420–421, 427–428, 456, 467–469, 155, 160, 459, 461, 152–154, 156, 460, 462, 157, 164, 457–458, 228–231, 222–227
- LMS numbers 15159–15226
- BR numbers 55159–55226

== William Pickersgill ==
159 Class, 10 built 1915-1922

- Built at St Rollox Works to orders Y114 (4) and Y130 (6)
- CR numbers 159, 161–163, 418, 425–426, 430, 435–436
- LMS numbers 15227-15236
- BR numbers 55227-55236

431 Class, 4 built 1922

- Built at St Rollox Works to order Y130
- CR numbers 431–434
- LMS numbers 15237–15240
- BR numbers 55237–55240

== LMS locomotives ==
Class 2P, 10 built 1925

- Built by Nasmyth Wilson (works numbers 1453–1462) to LMS lot no. 23
- LMS numbers 15260–15269
- BR numbers 55260–55269

== Dimensions ==
CR class	LMS class	Boiler pressure	Cylinders	Driving wheels	Weight
488	—		17″ × 22″, outside	4′ 8 1/2″	42 tons 3 1/2 cwt
171	1P	150 psi	16″ × 22″	5′ 0″	37 tons 15 cwt
19	2P	180 psi	18″ x 26″	5′ 9″	53 tons 16 cwt
92	2P	180 psi	18″ x 26″	5′ 9″	53 tons 19 cwt
104	1P	150 psi	17″ x 24″	4′ 6″	51 tons 2½ cwt
879	2P	180 psi	18″ x 26″	5′ 9″	53 tons 16 cwt
439	2P	180 psi	18″ x 26″	5′ 9″	53 tons 19 cwt
159	2P	180 psi	18″ x 26″	5′ 9″	57 tons 12 cwt
431	2P	180 psi	18¼″ x 26″	5′ 9″	57 tons 17 cwt
—	LMS 2P	180 psi	18¼″ x 26″	5′ 9″	59 tons 12 cwt

Note

The weight figures differ by up to 3 cwt between sources. This may simply reflect the amount of fuel and water on board.

== Condensing locomotives ==
The 19 and 92 Classes were originally fitted with condensing apparatus for use on Glasgow Central Low Level lines.

== See also ==
- Caledonian Railway 439 Class
- Locomotives of the Caledonian Railway
