= Caledonian Railway 782 Class =

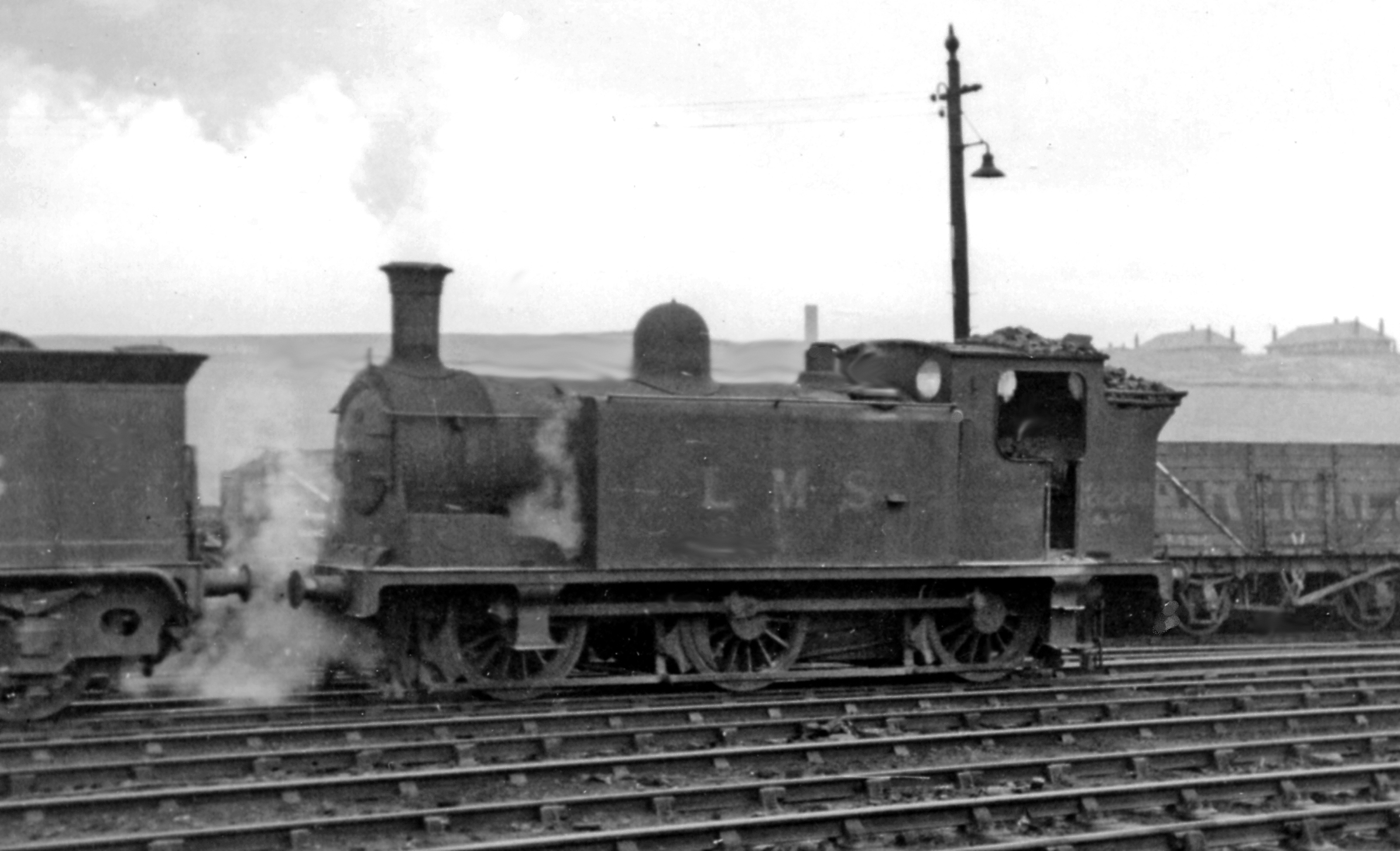
- No. 16289 at Balornock (St Rollox) Locomotive Depot 15 August 1948
Type and origin
- Power type: Steam
- Designer: John F. McIntosh
- Builder: CR St. Rollox Works
- Build date: 1896
- Total produced: 137
Specifications
- Configuration
  - Whyte: 0-6-0T
- Gauge: 4 ft 8 1/2 in (1,435 mm) standard gauge
- Driver dia.: 4 ft 6 in (1.37 m)
- Loco weight: 49 long tons 15 cwt (111,400 lb or 50.5 t)
- Fuel type: Coal
- Boiler pressure: 160 psi (1,100 kPa)
- Cylinders: Two, inside
- Cylinder size: 18 in × 26 in (460 mm × 660 mm)
- Valve gear: Stephenson
Performance figures
- Tractive effort: 21,215 lbf (94.37 kN)
Career
- Operators: Caledonian Railway, London Midland and Scottish Railway, British Railways
- Class: 3F
- First run: 1896
- Withdrawn: 1959-1962
- Disposition: All scrapped

The Caledonian Railway 782 Class was a class of 0-6-0T steam locomotives designed by John F. McIntosh and introduced in 1896. The 29 Class was similar but fitted with condensing apparatus. The locomotives were taken into London, Midland and Scottish Railway (LMS) ownership in 1923 and into British Railways (BR) ownership in 1948. All 137 members of the class were withdrawn between 1959-1962, and none have been preserved.

== Numbering ==
29 Class

- LMS numbers 16231–16239
- BR numbers 56231–56239

782 Class

- LMS numbers 16240–16376
- BR numbers 56240–56376

== Sources ==
- Ian Allan ABC of British Railways Locomotives, 1948 edition, part 3, pp. 46–47

== See also ==
- Locomotives of the Caledonian Railway
