= Slamannan and Borrowstounness Railway =

UK railway line

The Slamannan and Borrowstounness Railway was a railway built in Scotland in 1848 to extend the Slamannan Railway to the harbour at Borrowstounness (now called Bo'ness) on the Firth of Forth, and to connect with the Edinburgh and Glasgow Railway. It was not commercially successful, but in recent years part of it was taken over by the Scottish Railway Preservation Society, which operates the Bo'ness and Kinneil Railway.

== Background ==
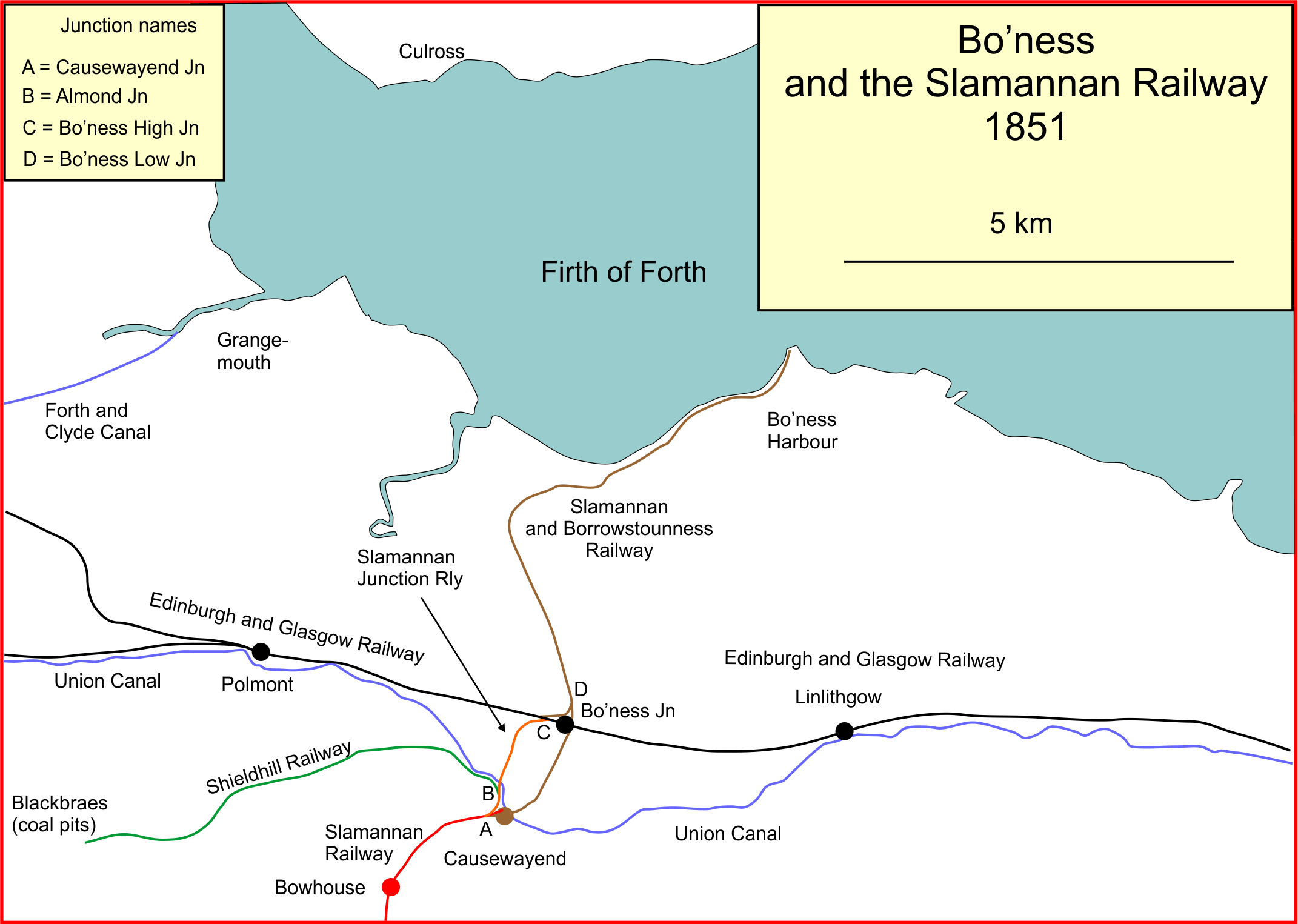
Bo'ness and railway connections to the Slamannan Rly and the E&GR

The Slamannan Railway had been opened in 1840 between Arbuckle (near Airdrie) and Causewayend (on the Union Canal, west of Linlithgow). It was built with the hope of opening up mineral extraction in the otherwise undeveloped land that it crossed. The mineral workings proved disappointing, and an early intercity passenger service between Edinburgh and Glasgow over the line and associated lines and the Union Canal was wiped out when the more technologically advanced Edinburgh and Glasgow Railway (E&GR) opened in 1842.

Looking for opportunities to revive the company's fortunes, the Slamannan company decided to extend from Causewayend to form a junction with the E&GR, and to extend to the harbour at Borrowstounness (Bo'ness). Connection to the E&GR would give onward transport opportunities for minerals from the Slamannan area and the Monkland coalfields and ironworks; the Bo'ness Harbour connection was to give export and import potential. The port was declining in importance, particularly due to nearby Grangemouth, which benefitted from the termination of the Forth and Clyde Canal and the authorities at Bo'ness welcomed the prospect of a railway connection. In 1845 a blast furnace was started at Kinneil, processing the ironstone that was already being mined in the vicinity.

The Slamannan proprietors arranged for friendly interests to promote a nominally independent company to get to Bo'ness, and the Slamannan and Borrowstounness Railway (S&BR) was authorised by the Slamannan and Borrowstounness Railway Act 1846 (9 & 10 Vict. c. cvii) on 26 June 1846 to make the line. The main line from Causewayend to Bo'ness Harbour was to be 5 1/2 miles (8.9 km) long, with a spur from the E&GR line so arranged as to allow through running from the Polmont direction to Bo'ness. The capital was to be £105,000 with borrowing powers of £35,000.

Carter (1959) says that there were two branches to connect to the E&GR line, aggregating to 1 1/4 miles (2.0 km), but he was probably including the separate Slamannan Junction Railway, which built a south-to-east spur from the Slamannan Railway to Manuel on the E&GR. That railway got its act of Parliament, the Slamannan Junction Railway Act 1844 (7 & 8 Vict. c. lxx), on 4 July 1844 and opened in August 1847.

The S&BR line was to leave the Slamannan main line at Causewayend, and cross the Union Canal by a moveable bridge, turning north and passing under the E&GR main line near Myrehead Farm, with one or more branches to the E&GR line near there.

== Construction not started ==
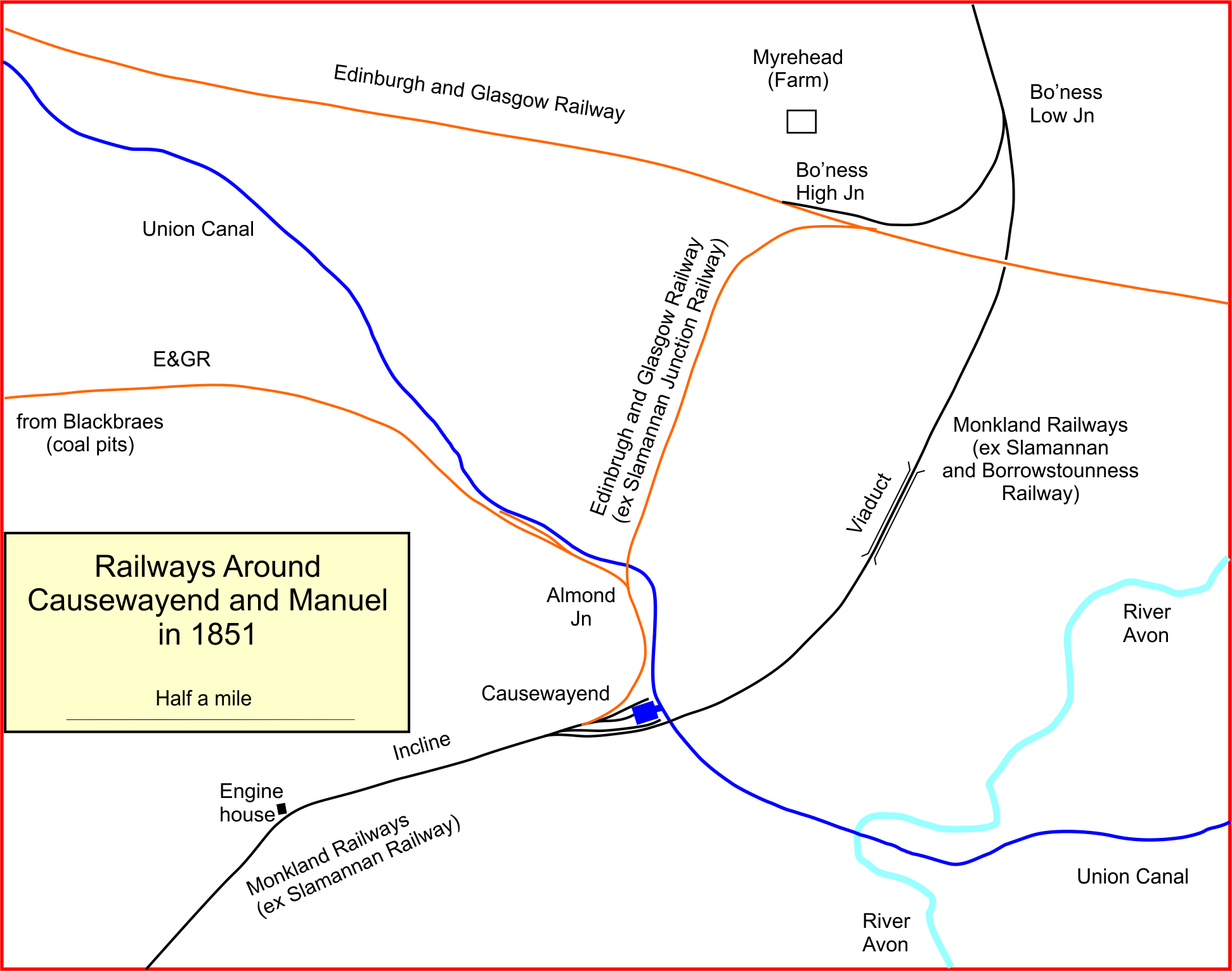
Railways around Causewayend and Manuel in 1851

Relations with the E&GR became difficult at this stage, and a start on construction was frustrated for some time. In the interval the Slamannan Railway and the other "coal railways" in west Central Scotland changed their gauge from 4 ft 6 in (1,372 mm) to standard gauge 4 ft 8 1/2 in (1,435 mm) in July 1847, and they merged, forming the Monkland Railways on 14 August 1848. The powers to build the Slamannan and Borrowstounness Railway were transferred to the Monkland Railways at the same time.

When there was a reconciliation, it was proposed that Slamannan trains for Bo'ness should use the now-completed Slamannan Junction line from Causewayend, joining and immediately leaving the E&GR line and descending to what became Bo'ness Lower Junction. At a stroke this would save the cost of constructing the "low level" line from Causewayend, with its civil engineering challenges in crossing the Union Canal, the viaduct over the low ground south of Whitecross, and the bridge under the E&GR near Myrehead.

Evidently there had been a cooling off over building the line at all, for the directors addressed the shareholders reminding them of the advantages of the connection to Bo'ness, emphasising that at the time the Monkland company had no ultimate terminal of their own, relying on onward conveyance by other railways or by canals. The powers for land acquisition under the Slamannan and Borrowstounness Railway Act 1846 were close to being out of time.

Even then there was dubiety over the profitability of the new line, but this was laid to rest when John Wilson, owner of the Kinneil iron works, guaranteed annual traffic to the value of £3,000, and at a shareholders' meeting on 12 June 1849—fourteen days before the land purchase powers were due to lapse—the decision to actually build the line was taken—but even now this was subject to getting Wilson's undertaking properly formalised. The actual decision to start was taken at another shareholders' meeting on 28 September 1849—still omitting the "low level line".

== A start in building the line at last ==
Contracts for building the line between Myrehead and Bo'ness were let to John Barr & Co in October 1849, the works to be finished by April 1851.

While the work proceeded satisfactorily, the Directors now reconsidered their decision to run trains via the E&GR at Myrehead. It was realised that, for a train from Slamannan, the point of convergence with the E&GR would be after the point of divergence of the line to Bo'ness, so that a backshunt on the busy E&GR main line would be required. Moreover, the E&GR were now making technical stipulations regarding the composition of wagon wheels, which would be extremely expensive to comply with.

The shareholders now decided (on 28 May 1850) to build the "low level line" after all, crossing under the E&GR near Myrehead Farm (later to be known as Manuel). The E&GR took umbrage at this change of heart, and put further obstructions in the way of the work, especially over the building of the bridge to carry the low level line under their main line.

The directors obtained a further act of Parliament, the Monkland Railways (Slamannan and Borrowstouness Deviation) Act 1851 (14 & 15 Vict. c. lxii), on 3 July 1851 confirming the powers to acquire land, and authorising a number of deviations, including the power now to build a fixed bridge over the Union Canal. The inhabitants of Bo'ness demanded, and got, a promenade on the sea side of the new railway line.

== First trains ==
The first revenue-earning train ran on 17 March 1851 over a short section of line to Kinneil Iron Works; the line was still in the hands of the contractor at this time. However the line between Bo'ness High Junction and Bo'ness Harbour opened fully in early August 1851, with the low level line being opened on 22 December 1851. In the intervening period, all through traffic travelled via the E&GR connections, including the backshunt there. for goods and mineral traffic only.

== Passenger operation ==
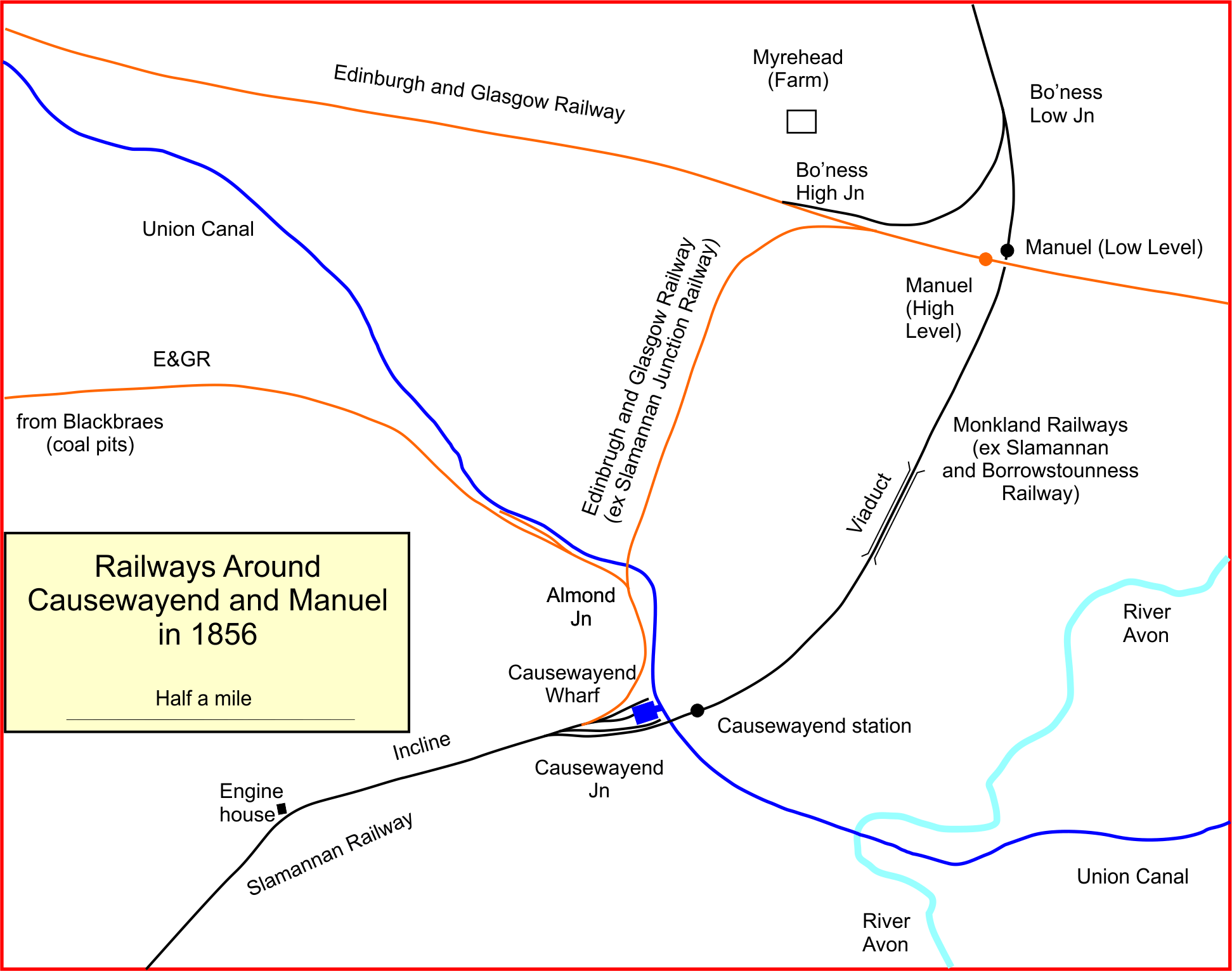
Railways at Causewayend and Manuel in Scotland in 1856

The opening to Bo'ness had been for goods and mineral trains only, but there was pressure to operate passenger trains on the branch also. An engine turntable had to be provided at Bo'ness, and Lt-Col George Wynne inspected the line on 6 June 1856 and passed it as fit for passenger operation. It probably started passenger operation on 10 June 1856.

The Slamannan Railway had operated trains to Causewayend, and there seems to have been no proper station there, but probably simply a place near the canal wharf where passengers boarded and alighted. The line to Bo'ness diverged just before the wharf area, at Causewayend Junction, and a new Causewayend station was provided on the line, to the east of the Union Canal.

A station was provided at Manuel, immediately north of the E&GR main line, connected by a pathway to a station on the E&GR. This was called Bo'ness Junction at first. Probably in 1865 the two stations changed their names to Manuel (Low Level) and Manuel (High Level). There is considerable contradiction among sources over dates and names; Butt gives the High Level station opening, as Bo'ness Junction, in 1842; this was nine years before Bo'ness got its railway; and that the station was renamed Manuel (High Level) in 1866. He gives Manuel (on the S&BR line) as opening on 10 June 1856, later renamed Manuel (Low Level) on an unspecified date. Cobb gives Bo'ness Junction opening on the E&GR in 1851, but this may be confusion with the geographical junction rather than a passenger station; he gives Manuel Low Level as opening in 1856. Quick says that both stations, Manuel (on the E&GR line) and Manuel Low Level (on the S&BR line), opened on 1 January 1866, in accordance with an advertisement published by a North British Railway on 26 December 1865, and that there was no previous use of a passenger station called Bo'ness Junction; indeed the physical junction was only renamed thus from Slamannan Junction in 1866.

There is a photograph of Manuel (Low Level) station on the Canmore website of the Royal Commission on the Ancient and Historical Monuments of Scotland.

== Absorption by the North British Railway ==
The Monkland Railways were absorbed by the Edinburgh and Glasgow Railway by an Act of Parliament, dated 5 July 1865, effective from 31 July 1865. A day later (on 1 August 1865) the Edinburgh and Glasgow Railway was absorbed into the North British Railway.

== The present day ==
The majority of the line from the junction with the E&GR main line is still open as the Bo'ness and Kinneil Railway heritage line. The remainder of the line, and the Slamannan Railway itself, is closed.

Starting at Bo'ness, the small two platform station was situated west of the current SRPS facility - the area is now a roundabout and car park situated between Church Wynd and Seaview place. Extensive timber, coal and general sidings existed in Bo'ness and extended as far as Bridgeness. Passenger services tended to run through to Glasgow via Slamannan and Airdrie, although connections were made at Manuel for trains to and from Edinburgh and Glasgow, as well as direct services from Glasgow via Falkirk.

The majority of goods traffic went to and from Kipps and Coatbridge via Slamannan. The line served mainly coal mines, with connections to foundries, oil works, and an interchange for canal traffic near Causewayend.

== Connections to other lines ==
- Edinburgh and Glasgow Railway at Coatbridge Line, Bo'ness High and Low Junctions
- Slamannan Railway at Causewayend Junction.
