= Scottish Railway Preservation Society =

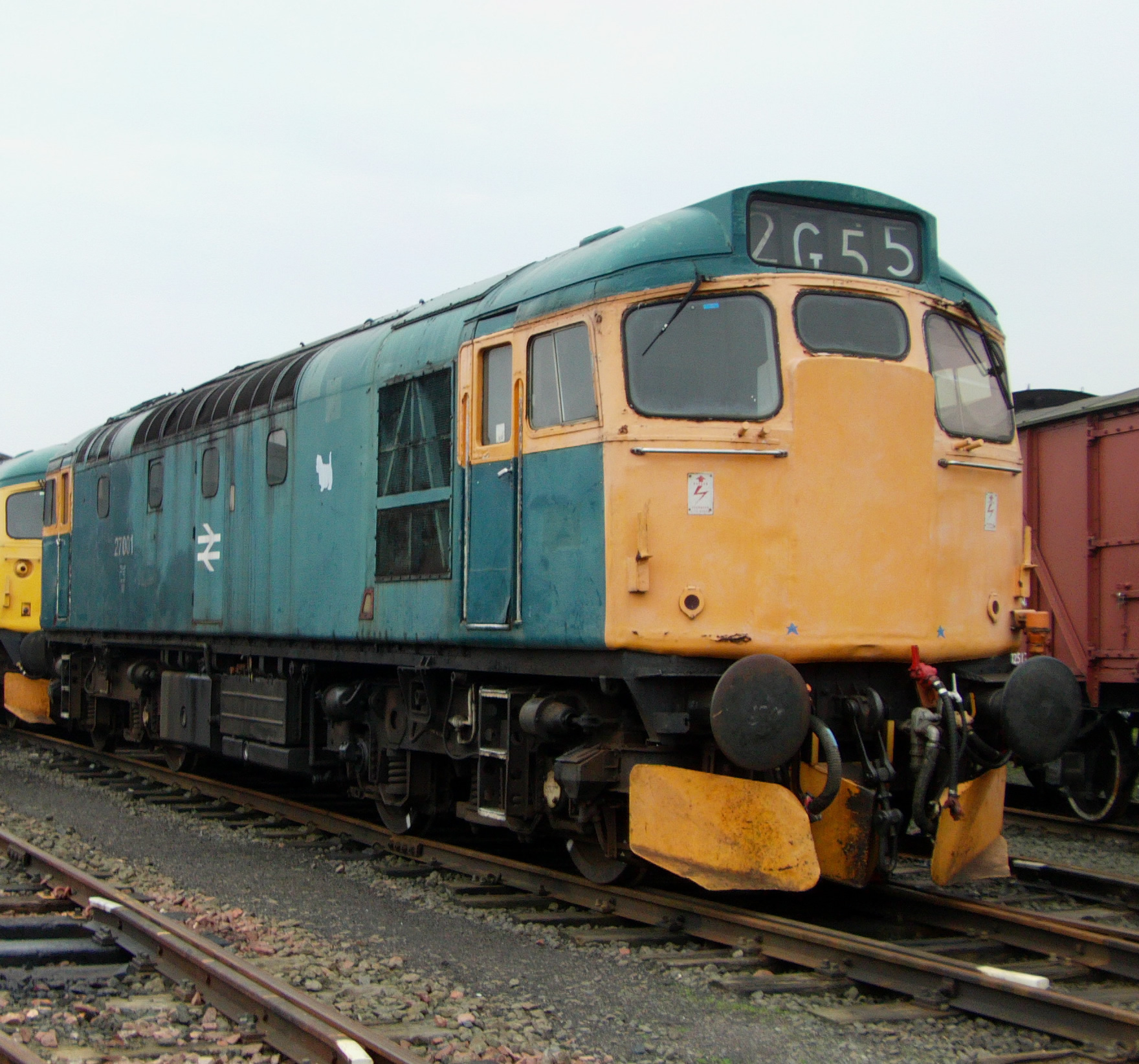
Bo'ness & Kinneil Railway based 27001 standing in front of the C&W building at Bo'ness

The Scottish Railway Preservation Society is a registered charity, whose principal objective is the preservation and advancement of railway heritage in Scotland. The society's headquarters are at Bo'ness, in central Scotland.

== Overview ==
The society undertakes conservation, restoration, repair, maintenance, and (where appropriate) demonstration operation of railway artifacts ranging from small objects to carriages, wagons and locomotives. It is also active in educational and curatorial activities including research, interpretation and outreach.

== Bo'ness and Kinneil Railway ==
The society built the Bo'ness and Kinneil Railway heritage railway on which the historic collection is demonstrated in action and stored.

== Museum of Scottish Railways ==
The Society runs the Museum of Scottish Railways at its headquarters at Bo'ness.

== SRPS Railtours ==
A subsidiary company, SRPS Railtours, operates excursion trains on the main line. These excursion trains are mostly operated within or originating from Scotland. SRPS Railtours uses coaches from the SRPS's large fleet of preserved British Rail Mark 1's for its excursions. Since 1970, these trains have travelled over the railway network as far as Wick and Penzance and frequently travel over the scenic West Highland Line and Kyle of Lochalsh Line.
