= Locomotives of the Great North of Scotland Railway =

The communities that were served by the Great North of Scotland Railway

The locomotives of the Great North of Scotland Railway were used by the Great North of Scotland Railway to operate its lines in the far north-east of the country. The railway opened in 1854 with just five 2-4-0 steam locomotives, and from 1862 it used 4-4-0 exclusively as the wheel arrangement for its tender locomotives. When it expanded by amalgamation in 1866, it inherited some locomotives from these companies. It purchased most of its locomotives, although building a small number itself, two at its first works at Kittybrewster, and ten later at Inverurie Locomotive Works.

When the Great North of Scotland became part of the London and North Eastern Railway in 1923, it passed on 122 steam locomotives, 100 4-4-0 tender locomotives and 22 tank engines, all of which were capable of being used on both passenger and goods trains. One locomotive, No. 49, Gordon Highlander, has been preserved as a static exhibit.

== Early locomotives ==
No. 4, one of the original seven passenger locomotives, here fitted with a cab

The first Great North of Scotland Railway locomotives were 2-4-0 tender engines, built by Wm Fairbairn in Manchester to the design of the locomotive superintendent Daniel Kinnear Clark. Twelve were ordered for the opening of the first line, seven passenger, numbered 1 to 7, and five goods, numbered 8 to 12 and as early GNoSR locomotives were known by the lowest numbered engine in the class, these became Class 1 and Class 8. The goods locomotives had been ordered as 0-6-0 and the specification changed during manufacture, and they were all fitted with Clark's patent smoke preventing system that improved fuel economy. Painted green with black borders, and red buffer beams, there was no protection for the driver or fireman and braking was by wooden blocks on the four wheels of the tender. The railway opened with only five locomotives, and within days one had been seriously damaged in a collision at Kittybrewster and a second had a mechanical fault. Two more locomotives had arrived by the end of 1854, and the order was complete by summer 1855. Four more passenger locomotives were ordered in 1857, and weatherboards and sanding equipment were fitted by 1860. Cabs were added in the 1880s, and the locomotives withdrawn during the 1880s and 1890s, the last in 1898.

John Folds Ruthven replaced Clark in 1855 and an order was placed with Beyer, Peacock & Co. for two 0-4-0 tank engines to bank trains on the line to Waterloo near Aberdeen harbour. Numbered 13 and 14, these locomotive were given new boilers in 1887 and sold to the War Department in 1916. No. 14 was in use until 1934 and scrapped in 1943. After William Cowan became locomotive superintendent nine more goods locomotives similar to Class 8 arrived in 1859–61. Built by Robert Stephenson & Co., these Class 19s survived to be later reclassified as Class B and the last was withdrawn in 1909. These were followed by nine 4-4-0s, also built by Stephensons, numbered 28–36 and delivered 1862–64. Later re-classified as Class H, these started work in Strathspey, and the class was re-boilered after No. 31 burst her boiler in 1878 at Nethy Bridge. The last of the class survived until 1920.

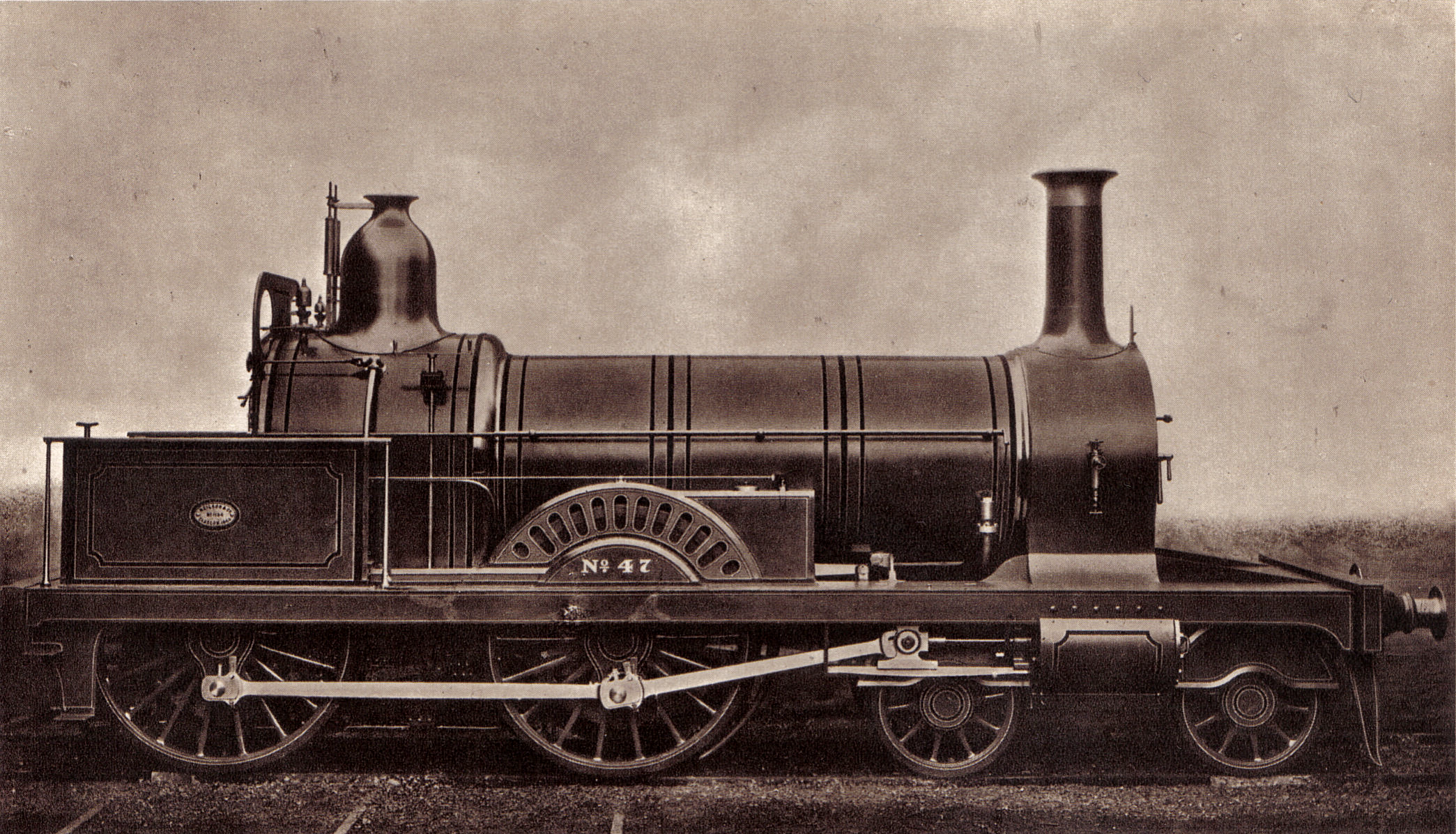
Locomotive No. 47 Class K as originally built

Six more powerful 4-4-0 locomotives arrived from Neilsons in 1866, fitted with a more modern bogie. Later classified as Class K and numbered from 43 as the Banffshire and Morayshire locomotives had been taken onto stock, these were rebuilt between 1889 and 1891. Three passed to the London and North Eastern Railway after the 1923 Grouping, and No. 45 hauled a train at the Railway Centenary celebrations in 1925 before being scrapped.

The financial situation in 1866 precluded buying any more locomotives until 1876. Partly to replace the Deeside locomotives, six 4-4-0 locomotives were built by Neilson's in 1876. These were similar to Class 43 but with larger boilers and fireboxes, and were the first to be built with cabs. Given the numbers 49, 50 and 54–57, (57 was soon renumbered 52), the locomotives later became Class L. These passed to the LNER and the last was withdrawn in 1924. The next twelve locomotives had rounded splashers over the trailing driving wheels, which meant shape of the cab was different, but retained the brass dome on the firebox, copper capped chimney and had brass bands joining the firebox and boiler. These became Class M, delivered in 1878, and the subsequent Class C that were numbered 1, 2 and 3, as they replaced the older locomotives. As the locomotive stock numbers were being reused, the lettering system of classes was introduced. These locomotives passed to the LNER and the last was withdrawn in 1940.

== Banffshire, Morayshire and Deeside Railways ==
In 1863 the GNoSR took over the operation of the Banffshire and Morayshire Railways, and took their locomotives onto stock. The Banffshire had four locomotives, two 0-4-2 tanks, named "Banff" and "Portsoy", built by Hawthorns of Leith for the line's opening 1859. The other two locomotives were 0-4-2 tender engines, one named "Keith" had been bought secondhand from the Scottish Central Railway, having been built in 1848 by the Vulcan Foundry in Warrington, and a similar tender engine built by Hawthorns. These were given the numbers 37–40 by the GNoSR, number 40 being sold to the Deeside Railway in 1864. No. 39 was scrapped in 1879, Nos 37 and 38 in 1885.

The Morayshire Railway had started services in 1852 with two 2-2-0 engines designed by James Samuel and built by Neilsons. Samuel had previously designed steam railcars, two of which had been built by William Bridges Adams for the Eastern Counties Railway. The locomotives proved inadequate and were withdrawn in 1859 and 1863, before the Great North took over services. They were replaced in 1859 and 1860/1 by two 2-4-0 tank engines. These were numbered 3 and 4 by the Morayshire and became the GNoSR railway's 41 and 42 and were used on the Oldmeldrum branch before being withdrawn in 1883 and 1885.

The GNoSR took over the operation of the Deeside Railway in 1866. Their first two locomotives were 0-4-2 tank engines, built by Hawthorns and arrived in 1854. No. 3, a tender locomotive, was delivered in 1854 from Dodds & Son of Rotherham, but this had mechanical defects and was never satisfactory. Between 1857 and 1866 four 0-4-2 tender locomotives arrived from Hawthorns; these were similar to the Banffshire's Nos. 3 and 4; the Deeside also bought the Banffshire's No. 4 in 1864. These locomotives were numbered 4 to 8 and most had four wheeled tenders except for No. 8, which was given a larger six-wheeled tender to allow it to haul the Royal Trains from Aberdeen to Ballater without stopping. No. 2 and 4 to 8 were taken on by the Great North in 1866 and given the numbers 39 and 49 to 53. The later tender locomotives were found to be unstable at higher speeds so were withdrawn by 1880 and No. 2 was withdrawn in 1883.

== James Manson ==
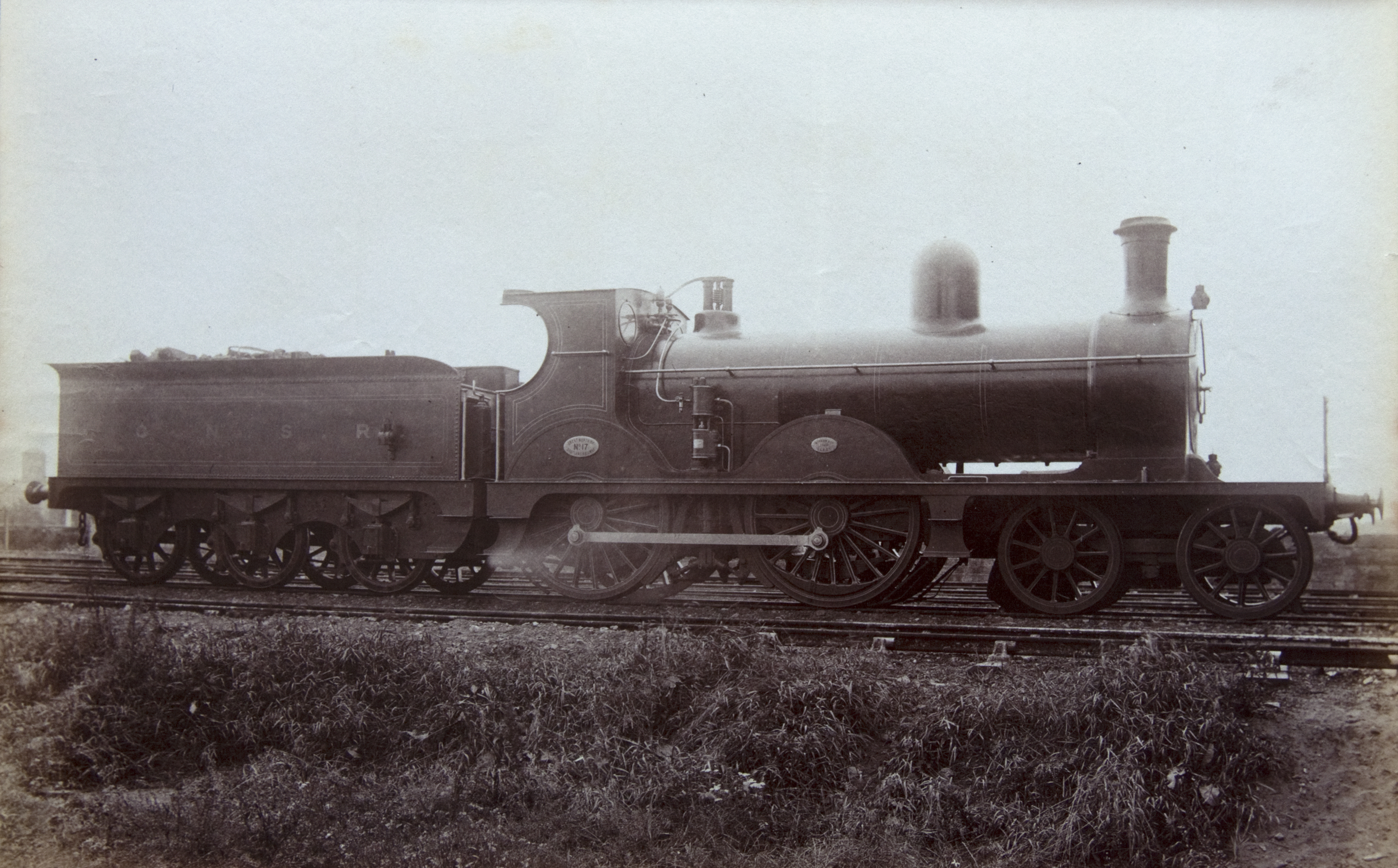
Class O No. 17

James Manson became Locomotive superintendent in 1883, moving from the Glasgow & South Western Railway. He introduced a more contemporary design of locomotive, with inside cylinders and doors on the side of cabs, and without brass domes or copper chimneys. The first six, Class A, built by Kitson & Co in Leeds in 1884, were followed by three similar but lighter Class Gs in 1885. These all passed to the LNER and withdrawn by 1934. The railway had inherited most its tank engines from the Deeside, Morayshire and Banffshire Railways and these needed replacing, so six 0-6-0T Class D arrived in 1884 and three of the slightly larger Class E the following year. The first tank engines in the country to be fitted with doors on the cabs, these later worked on the suburban services and one was fitted with a cowcatcher to work the St Combs Light Railway at Fraserburgh. They had been withdrawn by 1936.

In 1887 two locomotives similar to the Class G were built at Kittybrewster works. Although there was only space for four locos in the cramped repair shops the board expected to save £300 to £400 by building the locomotives themselves. These became the Class N and were withdrawn in 1932–36. Nine express Class O locomotives with six wheeled tenders were built by Kitsons in 1888. These were followed by six more with eight wheeled tenders and this time built by R. Stephenson & Co. This order was split into three Class Ps and three Class Qs with 6 feet 6 inches (1.98 m) driving wheels, the largest ever used by the Great North. In 1914 a Class Q was successfully trialled with a superheater, and most of the Class O, P and Q locomotives were fitted with superheaters, the eight wheeled tenders being replaced in most cases with six wheeled tenders during the rebuild. They were withdrawn between 1931 and 1946.

== Class S locomotives ==
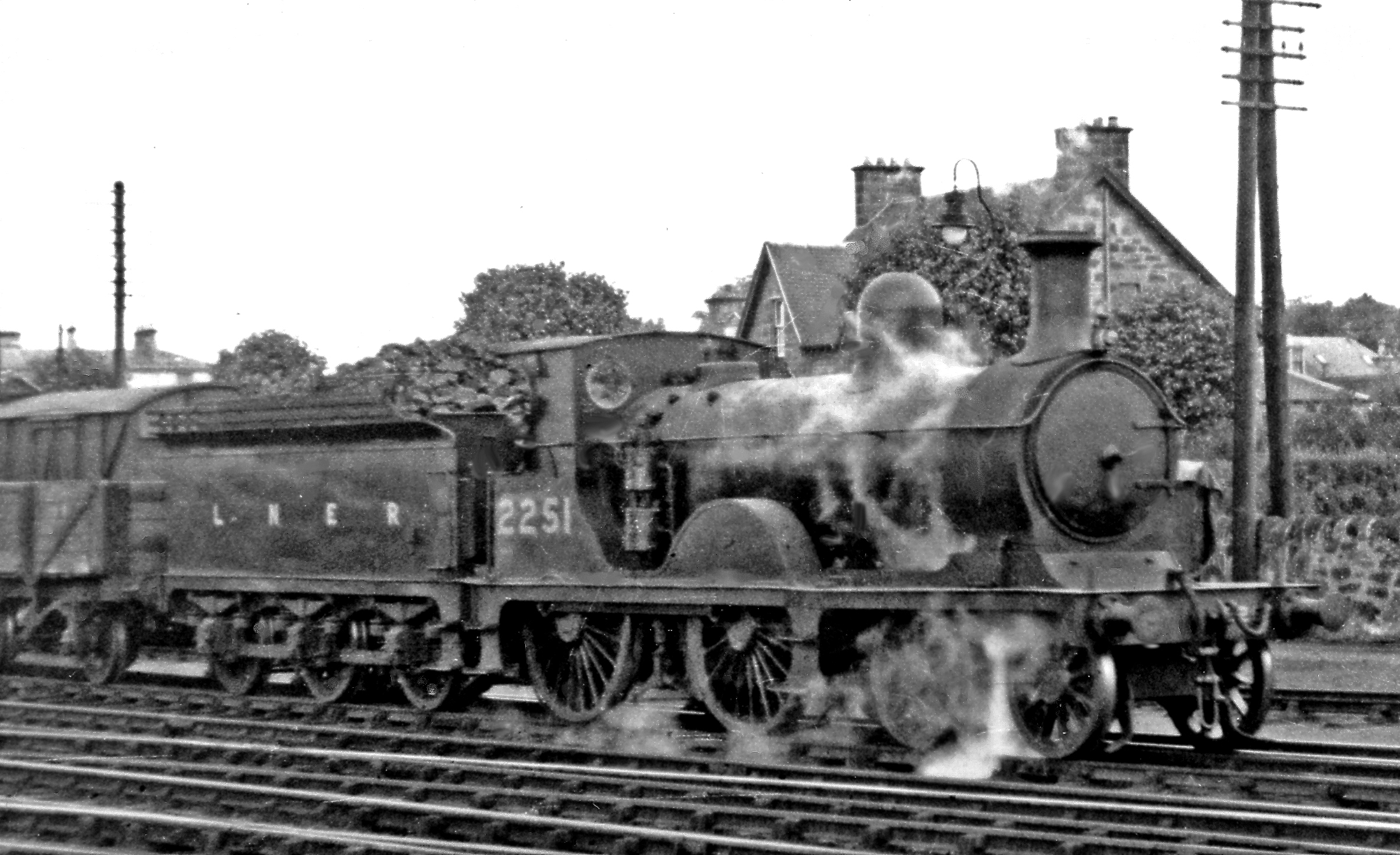
LNER 2251, built by the GNSR as Class T No. 107, is seen here shunting at Elgin in 1948.

In 1890 Manson was replaced by James Johnson as locomotive superintendent, the son of Samuel Waite Johnson, then locomotive superintendent at the Midland Railway. In 1893 Neilsons delivered six new 4-4-0 tender locomotives that were more powerful any previous Great North locomotive. With boilers with a working pressure of 165 pounds per square inch (1,140 kPa), they were the first GNSR locomotives not to have Clark's patent smoke prevention apparatus. Classified as Class S and known for rapid acceleration and sustained high speed, these were the blueprint for the future GNSR tender locomotives. Manson had left a design for a 0-4-4 tank locomotive and Johnson changed the firebox, boiler and value gear so they were the same as the Class S tender locomotives before ordering nine to work the Deeside line. Classified as Class R, these arrived in 1893, and most were transferred to the Aberdeen suburban services in 1900. Six were scrapped in 1937, the year the suburban services were withdrawn.

William Pickersgill replaced Johnson in 1894, and between 1895 and 1898 twenty-six new locomotives were purchased from Neilsons. There were similar to Johnson's Class S and classified Class T, and were recorded at speeds of 79.66 miles per hour (128.20 km/h) and running through Kennethmont to a stop 26 1/2 miles (42.6 km) away at Dyce in 23 minutes 46 seconds. A further order for ten was placed in 1899, but train mileage had been reduced and five were sold to the South Eastern & Chatham Railway. Classified Class V by the GNSR, these had square cabs.

Finding their locomotive works at Kittybrewster inadequate and construction began on the Inverurie Locomotive Works in 1898, electric lighting being provided in the buildings. The locomotive department moved in 1902; the buildings still stand and are listed category B. (Note: Buildings are classified in three categories: Category A are buildings of national or international importance, Category B are buildings of regional or more than local importance and Category C are buildings of local importance.) Inverurie station was rebuilt nearer the works in 1902, and is similarly a category B building. The GNSR built houses nearby for their staff, lit by electricity generated at the works, and the Inverurie Loco Works Football Club was formed by staff in 1902. These works were used by the GNSR between 1909 and 1915 to build eight more Class V locomotives.

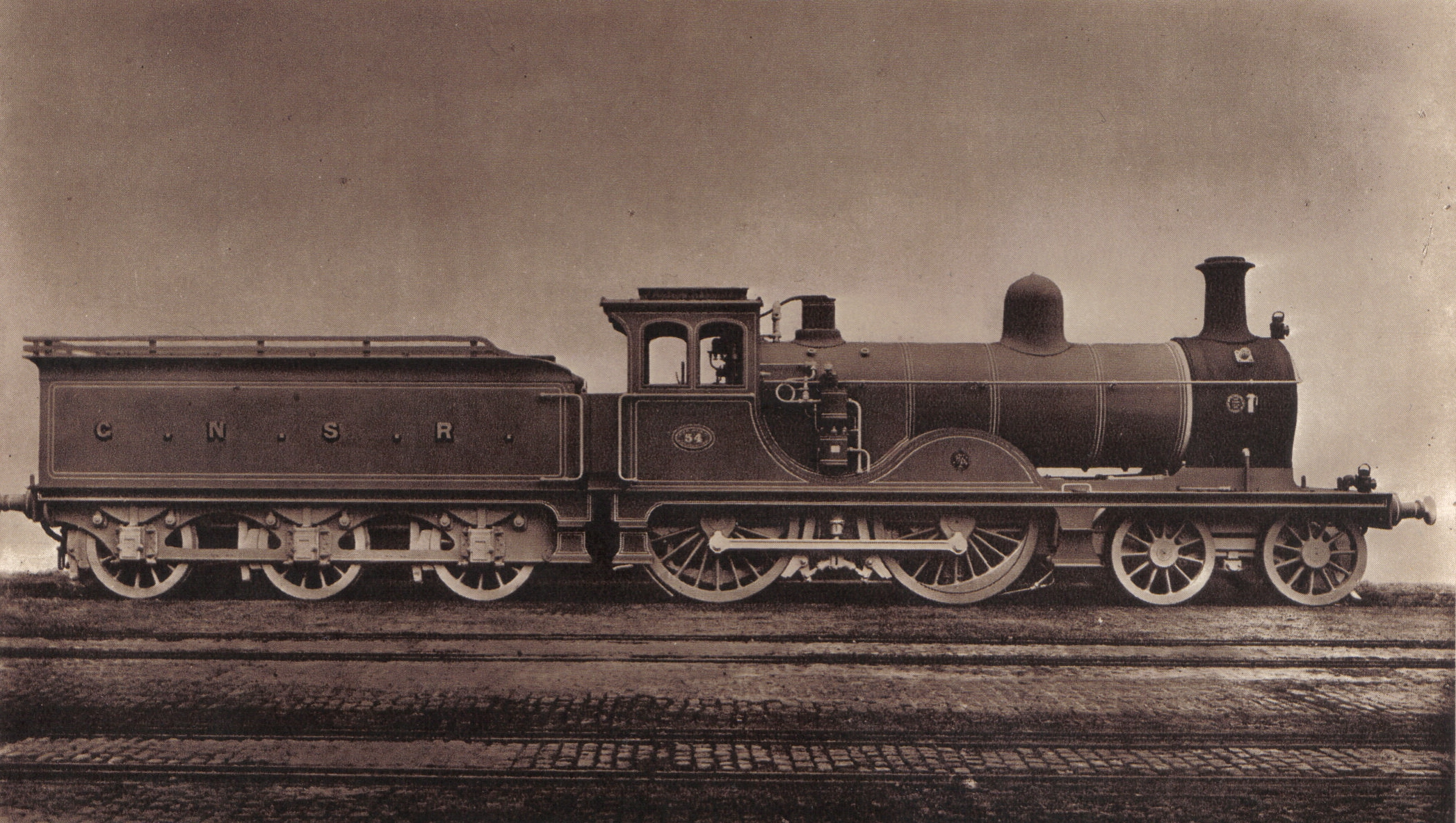
Class F No. 54 Southesk, as originally built

In 1905 the GNSR introduced two articulated steam railcars. The locomotive unit was mounted on four 3 feet 7 inches (1.09 m) wheels, one pair driven and with the Cochran patent boiler that was common on stationary engines, but an unusual design for a locomotive. The saloon carriage accommodated 46 third class passengers on reversible lath-and-space seats and a position for the driver with controls using cables over the carriage roof. The cars were introduced on the Lossiemouth branch and the St Combs Light Railway, but there was considerable vibration when in motion that was uncomfortable for the passengers and caused problems for the steam engine. Before they were withdrawn in 1909/10, one was tried on Deeside suburban services, but had insufficient accommodation and was unable to maintain the schedule.

Thomas Heywood took over from Pickersgill at Inverurie in 1914, three months before outbreak of war. The railway took over the working of the Aberdeen harbour railway and in 1915 purchased four 0-4-2T tank locomotives from Manning Wardle. After the war, six more locomotives were built in 1920 by the North British Locomotive Company, (Note: The North British were created in 1903 by the amalgamation of the Neilsons with Sharp, Stewart and Company and Dübs and Company.) and two locomotives the following year at Inverurie. Classified Class F, similar to the earlier Class V but with Robinson superheaters, these locomotives were given names. Heywood changed the livery during the war, and the traditional green had been replaced by black, lined with yellow and red.

== Legacy ==
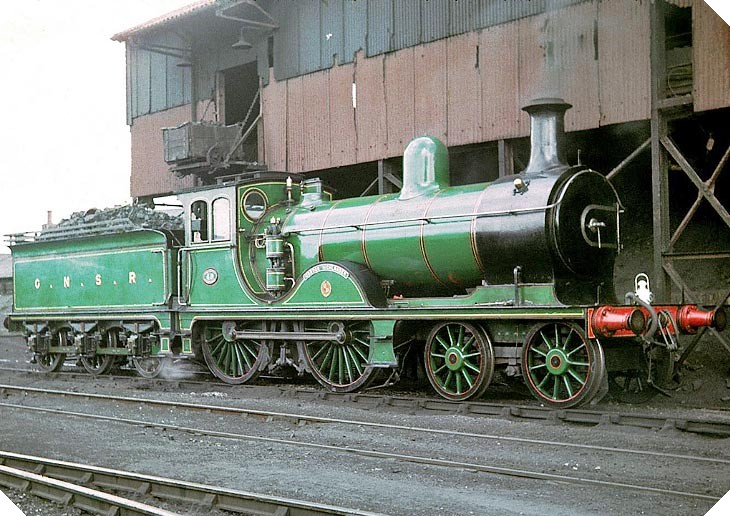
Gordon Highlander taking on coal in 1964

On 1 January 1923 the Great North of Scotland became a part of the Scottish division of the London and North Eastern Railway (LNER), who received a total of 122 locomotives, 100 4-4-0 tender locomotives and 22 tank engines, all capable of being used on either passenger or goods trains. The LNER reclassified the stock and renumbered them by adding 6800 to the former GNoSR stock number. Forty-four locomotives were still in service when the railway was nationalised in 1948, and the last two GNoSR locomotives to be withdrawn were, Nos. 43 and 30, two of the Aberdeen harbour tanks in 1960.

== List of locomotives ==
Locomotive superintendent	Class Number	Lettered Class	LNER class	Locomotive Numbers	Quantity	WA	Manufacturer	Date introduced	Date withdrawn	Notes
Daniel Kinnear Clark (1853–55)	1			1–7, 15–18	11	2-4-0	Wm. Fairbairn	1854–57	1879–97	
Daniel Kinnear Clark (1853–55)	8			8–12	5	2-4-0	Wm. Fairbairn	1855	1884–98	
John Folds Ruthven (1855–57)	13	F		13, 14	2	0-4-0T	Beyer, Peacock & Co.	1855/56	1934	
William Cowan (1857–83)	19	B		19–27	9	2-4-0	R. Stephenson & Co.	1859–61	1900–09	
William Cowan (1857–83)	28	H		28–36	9	4-4-0	R. Stephenson & Co.	1862–64	1905–20	
William Cowan (1857–83)	43	K	D47/2	43–48	6	4-4-0	Neilson & Co.	1866	1921–25	
Banffshire Railway				37–38	2	0-4-2T	Hawthorns of Leith	1859	1885	
Banffshire Railway				39	1	0-4-2	Vulcan Foundry	1848	1868	
Banffshire Railway				40	1	0-4-2	Hawthorns of Leith	1861	—	Sold to Deeside Railway
Morayshire Railway						2-2-0T	Neilson & Co.	1852	1859–63	Designed by James Samuel, not taken on by the GNoSR
Morayshire Railway				41–42	2	2-4-0T	Neilson & Co.	1859–60	1883–85	
Deeside Railway				39	2	0-4-2	Hawthorns of Leith	1854	1865 and 1883	Only one taken on by the GNoSR
Deeside Railway					1	0-2-4	Dodds and Son	1854	1871	Mechanical defects, not given a stock number by GNoSR
Deeside Railway				49–53	5	0-4-2	Hawthorns of Leith	1857–1866	1868–79	One had been the Morayshire Railway locomotive.
Cowan		L	D47/1	49, 50, 54–57; 57 renumbered No. 52	6	4-4-0	Neilson & Co.	1876	1924–26	
Cowan		M	D45	40, 51, 53, 57–62	9	4-4-0	Neilson & Co.	1878	1925–32	
Cowan		C	D39	1–3	3	4-4-0	Neilson & Co.	1879	1925–27	
James Manson (1883–90)		A	D44	63–68	6	4-4-0	Kitson & Co.	1884	1924–32	
James Manson (1883–90)		G	D48	69–71	3	4-4-0	Kitson & Co.	1885	1928–34	
James Manson (1883–90)		D	J90	8, 11, 15, 16, 39, 42	6	0-6-0T	Kitson & Co.	1884	1932–36	
James Manson (1883–90)		E	J91	37, 38, 41	3	0-6-0T	Kitson & Co.	1885	1931–34	
James Manson (1883–90)		N	D46	5, 6	2	4-4-0	GNSR Kittybrewster	1887	1932–36	
James Manson (1883–90)		O	D42	4, 7, 9, 10, 17, 18, 72–74	9	4-4-0	Kitson & Co.	1888	1935–46	
James Manson (1883–90)		P	D43	12–14	3	4-4-0	R. Stephenson & Co.	1890	1936–38	
James Manson (1883–90)		Q	D38	75–77	3	4-4-0	R. Stephenson & Co.	1890	1931–38	
James Johnson (1890–94)		R	G10	84–92	9	0-4-4T	Neilson & Co.	1893	1937–47	
James Johnson (1890–94)		S	D41	78–83	6	4-4-0	Neilson & Co.	1893	1947–	
William Pickersgill (1894–1914)		T	D41	19–24, 93–112	26	4-4-0	Neilson & Co.	1895–98	1946–	
William Pickersgill (1894–1914)		V	D40	25–26, 113–115	5	4-4-0	Neilson & Co.	1899–1900	1946–	Ten were ordered, five sold to the SE&CR
William Pickersgill (1894–1914)		W		29, 31	2	Steam railcars	Andrew Barclay Sons & Co.	1905	1909–10	
William Pickersgill (1894–1914)		V	D40	27–29, 31, 33–36	8	4-4-0	GNSR Inverurie	1910–15	1947–	
Thomas E. Heywood (1914–23)		Y	Z5	116 & 177, renumbered 30 & 32	2	0-4-2T	Manning Wardle	1915		
Thomas E. Heywood (1914–23)		X	Z5, later Z4	116 & 177, renumbered 43 & 44	2	0-4-2T	Manning Wardle	1915		
Thomas E. Heywood (1914–23)		F	D40	47–50, 52, 54	6	4-4-0	North British Loco. Co.	1920		Named
Thomas E. Heywood (1914–23)		F	D40	45–46	2	4-4-0	GNSR Inverurie	1921		Named

== Preservation ==
Class F No. 49, Gordon Highlander, numbered by the LNER No. 6849 after the Grouping, No. 2277 in 1946 and No. 62277 by British Rail on nationalisation, was restored to GNSR green in 1958, although it had not previously carried the green livery as it appeared in Heywood's lined black. It was used on special trains before becoming a static exhibit at the Glasgow Transport Museum in 1965, and is currently on loan to Scottish Railway Preservation Society at Bo'ness.

== References and notes ==
=== Sources ===
- Barclay-Harvey, Malcolm (1998) [1950]. A History of the Great North of Scotland Railway (2nd ed.). Ian Allan. ISBN 978-0-7110-2592-9.
- Rush, R.W (1971). British Steam Railcars. Oakwood Press. ISBN 0-85361-144-0.
- Vallance, H. A. (27 June 1991). Great North of Scotland railway. The History of the Railways of the Scottish Highlands vol 3. David St John Thomas. ISBN 978-0-946537-60-0.
