= 300 class =

300 class or Class 300 may refer to:

- Caledonian Railway 300 Class, 0-6-0 steam locomotives
- Manila Railroad 300 class, 0-8-0T steam locomotives
- South Australian Railways Redhen railcar#300 class single-ended power cars
