= Caledonian Railway 956 Class =

4-6-0 steam locomotives

Caledonian Railway 956 class
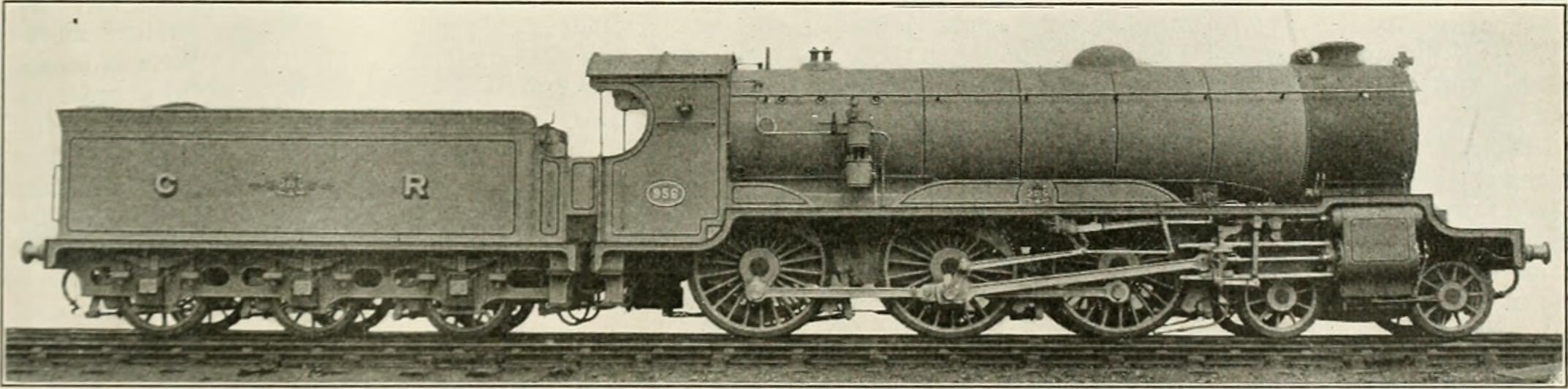
Type and origin
- Power type: Steam
- Designer: William Pickersgill
- Build date: 1921
- Total produced: 4
Specifications
- Configuration
  - Whyte: 4-6-0
  - UIC: 2'C
- Gauge: 4 ft 8 1/2 in (1,435 mm) standard gauge
- Driver dia.: 6 ft 1 in (1.854 m)
- Loco weight: 81 long tons (82 t; 91 short tons)
- Tender weight: 48 long tons (49 t; 54 short tons)
- Fuel type: Coal
- Firebox
  - Grate area: 28 square feet (2.6 m^{2})
- Boiler pressure: 180 psi (1.24 MPa)
- Superheater: Robinson
- Cylinders: Three
- Cylinder size: 18.5 in × 26 in (470 mm × 660 mm)
- Valve gear: See text
Performance figures
- Tractive effort: 27,975 lbf (124.4 kN)
Career
- Operators: CR • LMS
- Class: CR: 956
- Power class: LMS: 5P
- Numbers: CR 956–959; LMS: 14800–14803
- Withdrawn: 1931–1936
- Disposition: All scrapped

The Caledonian Railway 956 Class were 3-cylinder 4-6-0 steam locomotives that were used on the Caledonian Railway from 1921. They were built to the design of William Pickersgill. At the time they were the largest design operated by a Scottish railway.

== Introduction ==
The class ran to four members:

CR no.	LMS no.	Built	Works	Withdrawn	First allocation
956	14800	6/1921	St Rollox	8/1931	Glasgow (Balornock)
957	14801	7/1921	St Rollox	3/1934	Carlisle (Kingmoor)
958	14802	7/1921	St Rollox	1/1936	Carlisle (Kingmoor)
959	14803	8/1921	St Rollox	7/1933	Perth (South)

source: BritishSteam

== Dimensions ==
- Taper boiler, maximum diameter 5 ft 9 in (1.75 m)
- Cylinders (3), all 18.5-inch (470 mm) bore by 26-inch (660 mm) stroke, in line with the bogie centre
- As built, Walschaerts valve gear was applied directly to the outside cylinders and a form of derived motion was used for the inside one.

== Problems ==
The locomotives were large and visually very impressive, but they were not successful and never really got established in traffic. One author has described them as "that monumental flop of all time", another as "ineffectual giants".

Draughting was a problem from the beginning, and firemen had a lot of trouble keeping them up to pressure. There were other troubles thought to be a result of too small an ashpan causing choking of the grate. However, the chief problem was the failure of the unusual derived motion design. The valve gear was insufficiently robust and the valve spindle guides (originally cast iron) had to be replaced in cast steel, but this did not address the fundamental shortcomings of the design and the performance of these large locomotives remained woeful.

By early 1922 management decided things could not be left alone, and in April of that year No.s 957 and 958 were rebuilt to the strange arrangement of Walschaerts valve gears for the outside cylinders and Stephenson link motion for the inside one. At the same time No. 959 was given a modified version of the standard Caledonian equipment, but with dashpots added to absorb stress that was thought to exist at some points. No. 956 was first given a different variation of the standard arrangement, then brought into line with No. 959, but by the end of 1922 both had been altered again, this time to the same mixed gear arrangement as 957/958. It would have been difficult to retrofit Walschaerts gear to the inside cylinder (because there would be no mounting-point for the combination lever), but it seems strange that a modified Walschaerts gear was not used. It would have been possible to add a second eccentric to drive the combination lever.

None of the changes seems to have achieved very much. Experienced locomotive engineers have expressed astonishment and disbelief at the "cacophony" that the mixed valve gear gave rise to, and many have stated that the whole idea was a disaster.

== Withdrawal ==
Despite their larger size they were capable of no better work than the preceding 60 class (which did not have a sparkling reputation themselves), and the allocation of power class '5P' by the LMS was hardly deserved. Within a few years they had been relegated to freight traffic. Being a non-standard class of only four locomotives the LMS showed no interest in rebuilding them further and they were all withdrawn between 1931 and 1936.

== See also ==
- Locomotives of the Caledonian Railway
