= Reierson =

Reierson is a surname. Notable people with the surname include:

- Dave Reierson (born 1964), Canadian ice hockey player
- Raymond Reierson (1919–2020), Canadian politician
- William Reierson Arbuthnot (1826–1913), British businessman and legislator
