= GNSR Class R =

0-4-4T locomotive class

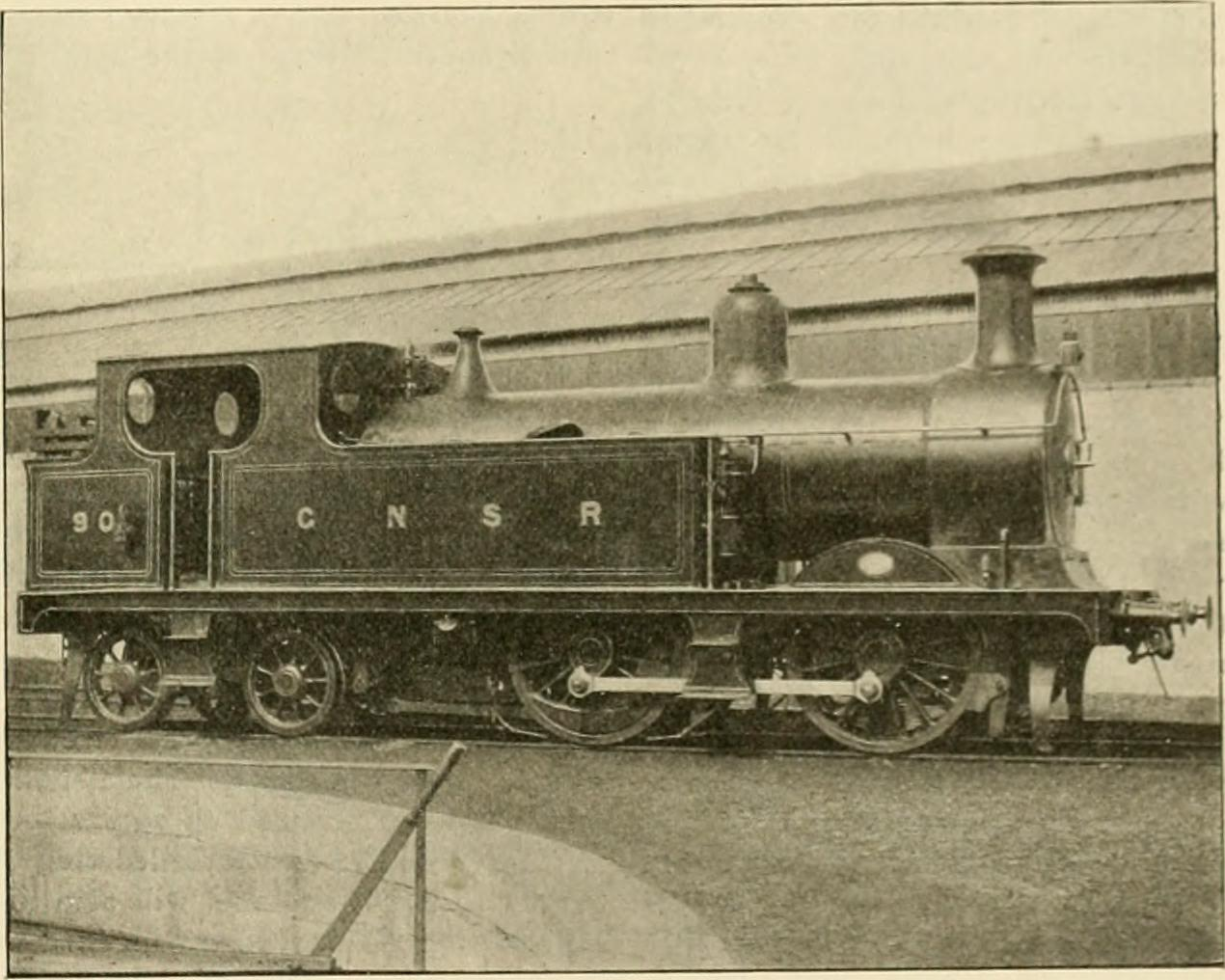
- GNSR Class R No. 90
Type and origin
- Power type: Steam
- Designer: James Johnson
- Builder: Neilson and Company
- Build date: 1893
- Total produced: 9
Specifications
- Configuration
  - Whyte: 0-4-4T
  - UIC: B2' h2t
- Gauge: 4 ft 8 1/2 in (1,435 mm)
- Coupled dia.: 5 ft 1 in (1,550 mm)
- Trailing dia.: 3 ft 1/2 in (927 mm)
- Wheelbase: 22 ft (6.7 m)
- Service weight: 53.75 LT (54.61 t)
- Fuel capacity: 2.0 long tons; 2.2 short tons (2 t)
- Water cap.: 1,200 imp gal (5,500 L)
- Firebox
  - Grate area: 18.24 sq ft (1.695 m^{2})
- Boiler pressure: 165 psi (11.4 bar)
- Heating surface
  - Firebox: 113.5 sq ft (10.54 m^{2})
  - Tubes and flues: 1,059 sq ft (98.4 m^{2})
  - Total surface: 1,172.5 sq ft (108.93 m^{2})
- Cylinders: Two, inside
- Cylinder size: 17.5 in × 26 in (440 mm × 660 mm)
- Valve gear: Stephenson
- Couplers: Buffers and chain
Performance figures
- Tractive effort: 18,612 lbf (82.79 kN)
Career
- Operators: Great North of Scotland Railway; London and North Eastern Railway
- Class: GNSR: R; LNER: G10
- Numbers: GNSR 84-92; LNER 6884-6892
- Withdrawn: 1937–1947
- Disposition: All scrapped

The GNSR Class R was a class of nine 0-4-4T tank locomotives built in 1893 for the Great North of Scotland Railway (GNSR). Designed by James Johnson and built by Neilson & Company, they were designed for hauling suburban trains in Aberdeen. After the grouping with the enactment of the Railways Act 1921, the London and North Eastern Railway (LNER) designated the locomotives under the G10 class. Owing to the cessation of Aberdeen suburban services in 1937, almost all of the G10s were withdrawn by 1940, with one surviving until 1947. None were preserved as all of them had been scrapped.

== History ==
In 1887, the Great North of Scotland Railway introduced suburban trains on the Aberdeen–Inverness line between Aberdeen and Dyce. On weekdays, eight trains per direction served five intermediate stations, providing the journey time in 20 minutes. These services required powerful locomotives with good acceleration. Initially, Aberdeen suburban services were hauled by Class D 0-6-0 tank locomotives built in 1884. The success of the suburban services resulted in high demand, leading to the GNSR gradually increase the service pattern to 20 trains per direction. The expansion of services required additional locomotives, especially since the existing types were also needed for goods trains and shunting duties. James Manson, locomotive superintendent of the GNSR, therefore designed an 0-4-4T tank locomotive. The production of this new design was put on hold due to the GNSR's unfavourable economic situation at the time. Manson would later move to the Glasgow and South Western Railway (G&SWR) in 1890, being succeeded by James Johnson, who did not order the locomotives until 1893. Johnson made several changes to Manson's original design, such as making the boiler, firebox and controls interchangeable with his then-contemporary 4-4-0 tender locomotive design, the GNSR Class S. Other design modifications made by Johnson include a different steam dome, safety valves and chimney. The design bore close resembelence to Manson's G&SWR 326 Class of 1893.

The nine locomotives were built by Neilson & Company and took over Aberdeen suburban services (which were known by locals as "subbies") and allowed the GNSR to expand the services onto the Deeside Line between Aberdeen and Culter. The immediate success of the services led to its expansion, and Class R locomotives took over other trains on the Deeside Line. One engine was briefly used on the Ellon to Boddam branch from its opening in 1897. From 1900, the Dyce and Deeside suburban services remained as the primary role for the Class Rs, with the locomotives being occasionally used for other trains.

After the amalgimation of the GNSR with the LNER, the Class R, redesignated as G10, remained within their initial sphere of operation. In the 1920s, the Aberdeen suburban trains were gradually losing their passengers to the Aberdeen trams and newly-established private bus companies, with the introduction of Sunday rail services at the end of the decade did little in leveling the competition. As the G10s were becoming worn out, the LNER decided to axe the Dyce and Culter suburban services on 5 April 1937.

As the nine G10s became redundant, by the end of the year, six members were withdrawn and scrapped. Two more followed in 1939 and 1940, leaving 6887, formerly GNSR no.87, in service until 1947, employed at Inverurie as a pilot shunter.

== Design ==
The GNSR Class R shared many design features present on contemporary 0-4-4T locomotives, which were a commonplace on the British rail network at the time, featuring plate frames, side tanks, and internal Stephenson valve gear. The Class R had two safety valves; one on the steam dome; and the other, equipped with a brass shrouding, on the firebox. The brass safety valve cover, as well as other features such as the chimney design and smokebox, was typical of Midland Railway locomotives – Johnson had received engineering training from his father Samuel Waite Johnson, who was the chief mechanical engineer for the Midland Railway from 1873 to 1903. William Pickersgill, who succeeded Johnson in 1894 as Locomotive Superintendent of the GNSR, replaced the brass safety valves with those of the Ramsbottom design.

Between 1916 and 1922, all nine Class R locomotives received new boilers. During that time, the dome safety valve was removed, and the Ramsbottom valve was replaced by the Ross pop valve.
