= Caledonian Railway 944 Class =

British steam locomotive class (1917)

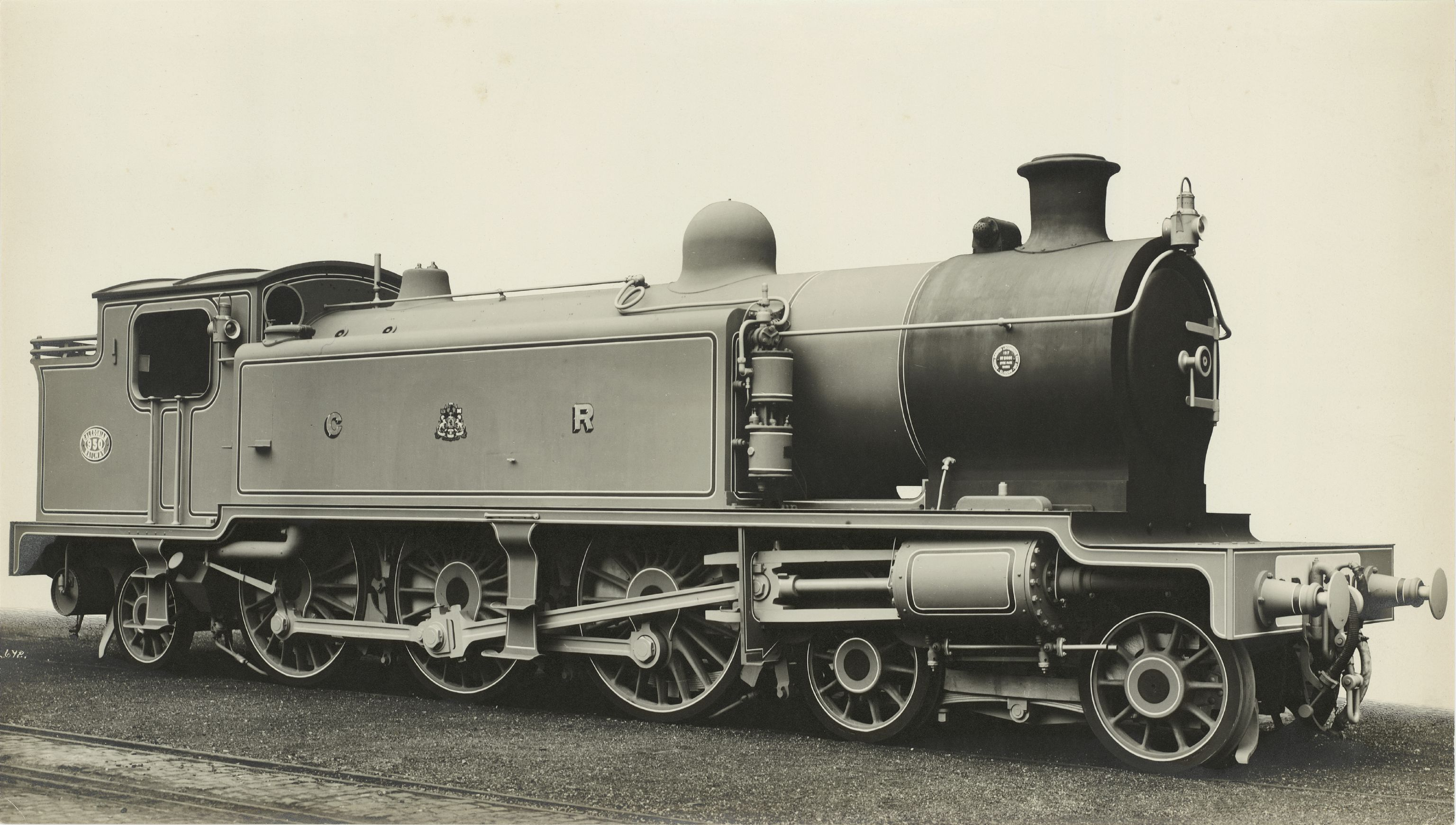
- Works Photograph of C.R. No. 950
Type and origin
- Power type: Steam
- Designer: William Pickersgill
- Builder: North British Locomotive Company, Hyde Park Works, Glasgow
- Serial number: 21480-21491
- Build date: 1917
- Total produced: 12
Specifications
- Configuration
  - Whyte: 4-6-2T
- Gauge: 4 ft 8 1/2 in (1,435 mm)
- Driver dia.: 5 ft 9 in (1.75 m)
- Loco weight: 91 long tons 13 cwt (205,300 lb or 93.1 t)
- Boiler pressure: 170 psi (1,172 kPa)
- Cylinders: Two, outside
- Cylinder size: 19.5 in × 26 in (495 mm × 660 mm)
- Valve gear: Stephenson
Performance figures
- Tractive effort: 20,804 lbf (92.54 kN)
Career
- Operators: CR • LMS • BR
- Class: CR: 944
- Power class: LMS: 4P
- Withdrawn: 1946-1953
- Disposition: All scrapped

The Caledonian Railway 944 Class were 4-6-2T passenger tank locomotives designed by William Pickersgill and built in 1917, at the North British Locomotive Company's Hyde Park Works in Glasgow. They were the Caledonian Railway's only Pacific-type.

== Overview ==
Although the Caledonian Railway built a long and successful series of small 0-4-4T passenger tank engines, the twelve locomotives of the 944 Class were the only large passenger tanks operated by the company. They shared much of their design with the contemporary 60 Class 4-6-0s. They were originally used on the Inverclyde Line and so gained the nickname 'Wemyss Bay Pugs' amongst enginemen.

The locomotives passed into the ownership of the London, Midland and Scottish Railway (LMS) upon its formation in 1923, and were repainted from Caledonian blue into LMS crimson lake livery, although within a few years this gave way to lined black livery. They were later displaced from the Inverclyde line by LMS Fowler and Fairburn 2-6-4Ts and by the time of nationalisation in 1948, the surviving locomotives were all allocated to Beattock shed, primarily for banking duties on Beattock Summit. They were all withdrawn and scrapped between 1946 and 1953.

== Numbering and locomotive histories ==
CR no.	LMS no.	BR no.	Builder's no.	Delivered	Withdrawn
944	15350	55350	NBL 21480	03/1917	04/1952
945	15351	(55351)	NBL 21481	03/1917	12/1948
946	15352	55352	NBL 21482	01/1917	03/1952
947	15353	55353	NBL 21483	01/1917	08/1951
948	15354	55354	NBL 21484	01/1917	08/1949
949	15355	(55355)	NBL 21485	01/1917	01/1948
950	15356	55356	NBL 21486	01/1917	06/1950
951	15357		NBL 21487	01/1917	07/1946
952	15358		NBL 21488	04/1917	05/1946
953	15359	55359	NBL 21489	04/1917	10/1953
954	15360	55360	NBL 21490	05/1917	02/1952
955	15361	55361	NBL 21491	05/1917	06/1952

sources: BritishSteam, Longworth (2005) p167
