= Arbuthnot baronets of Kittybrewster (1964) =

The Arbuthnot baronetcy of Kittybrewster in Aberdeenshire was created in the Baronetage of the United Kingdom on 26 February 1964 for John Sinclair Wemyss Arbuthnot, for services to church and state. As of 2026, the baronetcy is marked vacant on the Official Roll.

== Arbuthnot baronets of Kittybrewster (1964) ==
- Sir John Sinclair Wemyss Arbuthnot, 1st Baronet (1912–1992)
- Sir William Reierson Arbuthnot, 2nd Baronet (1950–2021). He was educated at Eton and College of Law, London, then worked as a lawyer including for Joynson-Hicks & Co; in 2010, he married Louise Alexandra Mary, daughter of (Edward) Bruce Barry (1928–1995), and was father of the 3rd Baronet and his twin brother, the heir presumptive. He also had a daughter from a previous relationship.
- Sir Henry William Arbuthnot, 3rd Baronet (b. 2011) does not appear on the Official Roll.

=== Coat of arms ===
Coat of arms of Arbuthnot of Kittybrewster
Crest a peacock's head and neck proper, accompanied on either side by a spray of strawberry leaves vert, each flowered of a cinquefoil argent. Escutcheon azure a crescent between three mullets argent, a bordure gules charged with two escallops in chief and a buck's head cabossed or in base, and in centre chief (overlapping bordure) an inescutcheon argent. Motto Deum laudans ("Praising God")

Arbuthnot Baronets of Kittybrewster line of succession
- Major Sir John Sinclair-Wemyss Arbuthnot, of Kittybrewster, 1st Baronet (1912—1992)
  - Sir William Reierson Arbuthnot, 2nd Baronet (1950–2021)
    - Sir Henry William Arbuthnot, 3rd Baronet (born 2011)
    - (1) John Walter Arbuthnot (b. 2011)
  - (2) Rt. Hon. James Norwich Arbuthnot, Baron Arbuthnot of Edrom (b. 1952)
    - (3) Hon. Alexander Broadbent Arbuthnot (b. 1986)

== Sources ==
- Mosley, Charles, ed. (2003). Burke's Peerage, Baronetage & Knighthood (107 ed.). Burke's Peerage & Gentry. ISBN 0-9711966-2-1.
