= John Thomas (British politician) =

John Richard Thomas (8 March 1897 – 4 July 1968) was a British Labour Party politician of Welsh provenance, and a Chartered Accountant.

He was elected as Member of Parliament (MP) for Dover at the 1945 general election, but did not contest the 1950 general election, when his seat was won by the Conservative candidate John Arbuthnot.

Parliament of the United Kingdom
Preceded by John Jacob Astor	Member of Parliament for Dover; 1945 – 1950	Succeeded by John Arbuthnot
