= Sir John Arbuthnot, 1st Baronet =

British politician (1912–1992)

Sir John Arbuthnot Bt MBE TD
- 1950 portrait

Member of Parliament for Dover
- In office 23 February 1950 – 25 September 1964
- Preceded by: John Thomas
- Succeeded by: David Ennals

Personal details
- Born: 11 February 1912 Kittybrewster, Scotland
- Died: 13 June 1992 (aged 80) Worlington, Suffolk, England
- Party: Conservative
- Spouse: Margaret Jean Duff (m. 1943)
- Children: 5, including James

Sir John Sinclair-Wemyss Arbuthnot, 1st Baronet, MBE, TD (11 February 1912 – 13 June 1992) was a British Conservative Party politician.

== Early life and education ==
Arbuthnot was born in Kittybrewster, the son of Major Kenneth Wyndham Arbuthnot (who was the son of William Reierson Arbuthnot) and Janet Elspeth Sinclair Wemyss. Kenneth had served with the Seaforth Highlanders since 1893, fighting in the Chitral Expedition in 1895, in the Mahdist War in the Sudan in 1898 (including the Battle of Omdurman), and in the Second Boer War from 1900 to 1902. He was brigade major of the Gordon Infantry Brigade when his son was born, but was killed in action in the Second Battle of Ypres in 1915.

John Arbuthnot was educated at Eton College, and Trinity College, Cambridge, where he graduated as a Bachelor of Arts in 1933. He received his MA in 1938. He worked in the tea industry and was a Director of Folkestone and Dover Water Company and other companies.

== Military service ==
Having been a cadet of the Junior Division of the Officer Training Corps while a pupil of Eton College, he was commissioned as a second lieutenant on 28 June 1939 in the Royal Artillery, Territorial Army.

Arbuthnot served in World War II in the Royal Artillery, rising to the rank of Major. In 1940, he was seconded to work with explosives. In the 1943 King's Birthday Honours, Captain (temporary Major) Arbuthnot was appointed Member of the Order of the British Empire (MBE). He received the Territorial Efficiency Decoration (TD) in 1951.

== Political career ==
Arbuthnot stood for election in Don Valley in 1935 and Dover in 1945, losing to Labour candidates both times. He was elected as the Member of Parliament (MP) for Dover in 1950, serving until 1964. He was Parliamentary private secretary for the Minister of Pensions from 1952 to 1955 and for the Minister of Health from 1956 to 1957. He was member of the Public Accounts Committee from 1955 to 1964. He also served as Second Church Estates Commissioner, the spokesman for the Church of England in the House of Commons, and as a Deputy Speaker.

== Honours ==
On 26 February 1964, Arbuthnot was created a baronet, of Kittybrewster in the County of the City of Aberdeen.

== Family ==
Arbuthnot married (Margaret) Jean Duff, daughter of Alexander Gordon Duff, on 3 July 1943. She died in 2023. They had five children, two sons and three daughters.

- Elizabeth Mary Arbuthnot (born 1947)
- Sir William Reierson Arbuthnot, 2nd Baronet (1950–2021)
- Rt Hon James Norwich Arbuthnot, Baron Arbuthnot of Edrom (life peerage) (born 1952)
- Louise Victoria Arbuthnot (born 1954), married David Bernard Lancaster, son of Major Bernard Thomas Lancaster on 16 June 1984
- Alison Jane Arbuthnot (born 1957)

Parliament of the United Kingdom
Preceded by John Thomas	Member of Parliament for Dover; 1950–1964	Succeeded by David Ennals
Baronetage of the United Kingdom
New title Services to Church and state	Baronet (of Kittybrewster); 1964–1992	Succeeded by William Arbuthnot
