= Inverurie Locomotive Works =

Coordinates: 57.286°N 2.374°W

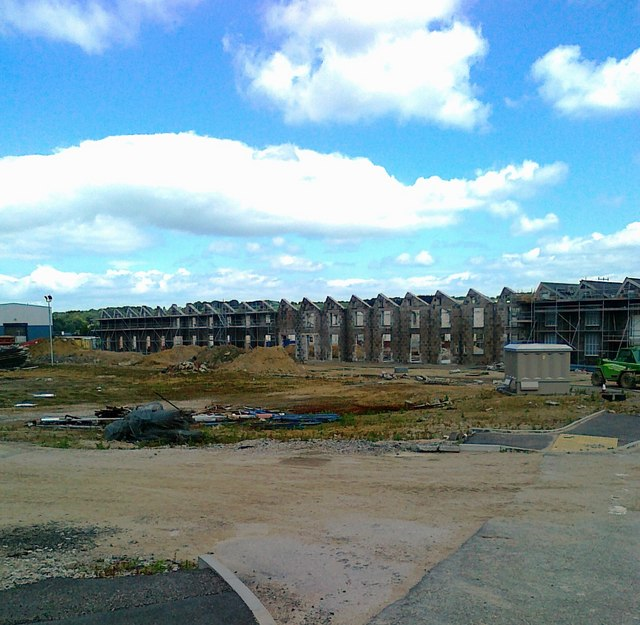
Inverurie Locomotive Works undergoing redevelopment, 2011

Inverurie Locomotive Works was created in 1902 when the Great North of Scotland Railway (GNSR) moved their works from Kittybrewster, in Aberdeen about 15 miles (24 km) to Inverurie.

== History ==
The Great North of Scotland Railway constructed its locomotive construction and repair works on a 15-acre (6.1 ha) site at Inverurie 16 miles (26 km) north west of Aberdeen, beside Inverurie railway station and the line to Keith. The works were designed by the engineer to the company, Patrick Moir Barnett.

Only ten locomotives were ever built at the Works. These locomotives which were 4-4-0 tender engines of GNSR Classes V and F were manufactured between 1906 and 1921. Although there were differences between the V and F engines, for example the F class were superheated, the London and North Eastern Railway counted members of both classes as LNER Class D40.

The works remained open for locomotive repair throughout London and North Eastern Railway and into British Railways ownership, finally closing in 1969.

The name is carried on by the local community in the form of Inverurie Loco Works FC, a part-time Scottish senior professional football club who are members of the Highland Football League.

A building from the former locomotive works is now home to the Garioch Heritage Centre.

== See also ==
- GNSR Classes V and F - for details of the ten locomotives built at Inverurie.
