= William Reierson Arbuthnot =

British businessman and legislator (1826–1913)

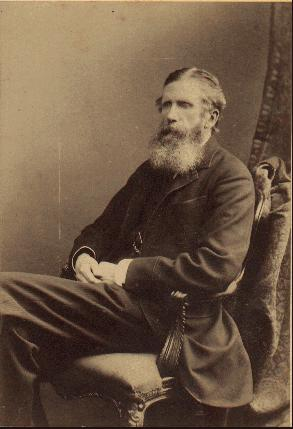
- Born: 28 January 1826; London, England
- Died: 31 May 1913 (aged 87)
- Occupations: Businessman, legislator
- Spouse: Mary Helen Anstruther (m. 1858)
- Children: 14

William Reierson Arbuthnot (28 January 1826 – 31 May 1913) was a British businessman and legislator primarily operating in Madras.

== Early life ==
William Reierson Arbuthnot was born at 14 Upper Wimpole Street, London, on 28 January 1826 to George Arbuthnot, of Elderslie, Surrey, and Elizabeth, daughter of Donald Fraser. The Arbuthnots were landowners and merchants of the Haddo-Rattray estate, Aberdeenshire, in Scotland for the previous two generations, and were formerly of Peterhead in that county. George Arbuthnot worked for 22 years (1800–23) as a merchant in Madras, and was a magistrate, before retiring to England and acquiring Elderslie; he also resided at Upper Wimpole Street in London during the winter.

== Career ==
Arbuthnot served as a member of the Madras Legislative Council from 1861 to 1864 and 1866 to 1870. He worked with Arbuthnot & Co and was Chairman of the Bank of Madras, and the Chamber of Commerce of Madras. He was also Director of Commercial Union Insurance Co and of the Midland Bank Ltd.

== Personal life ==
On 9 December 1858, Arbuthnot married Mary Helen Anstruther, the eldest daughter of Philip Anstruther, the Colonial Secretary of Ceylon. They lived at Plawhatch, Sussex, and had eight sons and six daughters; one of their sons, Major Kenneth Wyndham Arbuthnot (1873–1915), of the Seaforth Highlanders, was father of the politician Sir John Arbuthnot, 1st Baronet, of Kittybrewster.
