= Caledonian Railway 72 Class =

Class of 32 British 4-4-0 locomotives

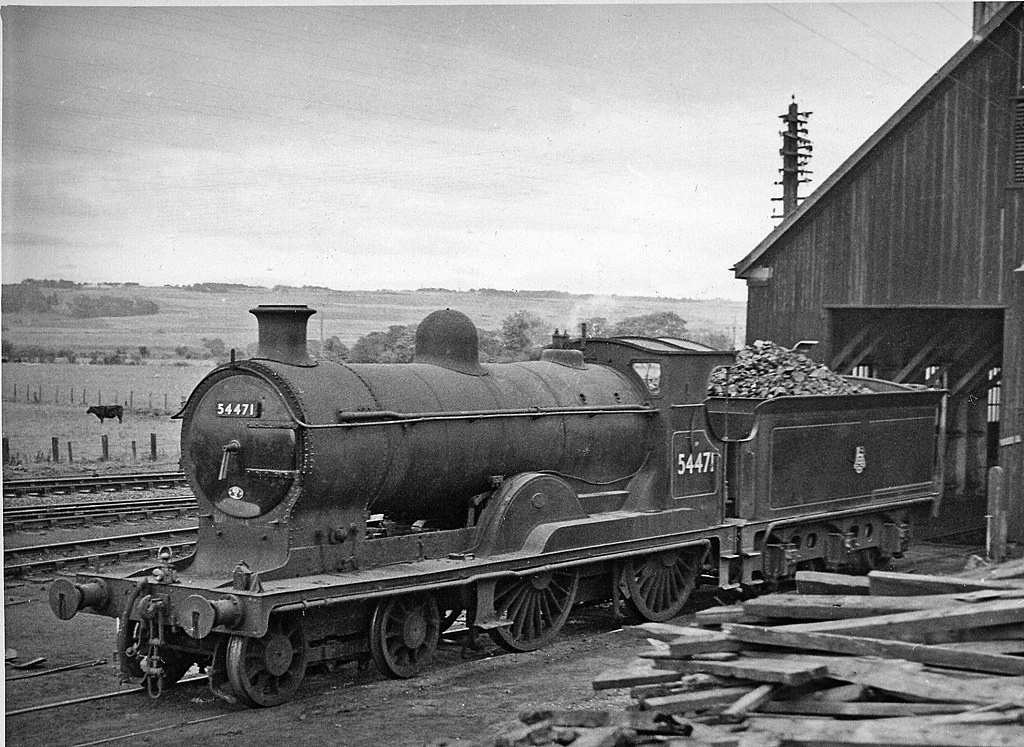
- 113 class No. 54471 at Dingwall in 1957
Type and origin
- Power type: Steam
- Designer: William Pickersgill
- Builder: St. Rollox Works (10); Armstrong Whitworth (10); North British Locomotive Co. (12)
- Build date: May 1920 to December 1922
- Total produced: 32
Specifications
- Configuration
  - Whyte: 4-4-0
  - UIC: 2′B h2
- Gauge: 4 ft 8 1/2 in (1,435 mm) standard gauge
- Leading dia.: 3 ft 6 in (1.067 m)
- Driver dia.: 6 ft 6 in (1,981 mm)
- Wheelbase: 46 ft 10 3/4 in (14.29 m)
- Length: 56 ft 4 1/2 in (17.18 m)
- Height: 12 ft 10 1/2 in (3,924 mm)
- Axle load: 19 long tons 18 cwt (44,600 lb or 20.2 t)
- Adhesive weight: 39 long tons 15 cwt (89,000 lb or 40.4 t)
- Loco weight: 61 long tons 5 cwt (137,200 lb or 62.2 t)
- Tender weight: 46 long tons 10 cwt (104,200 lb or 47.2 t)
- Total weight: 107 long tons 15 cwt (241,400 lb or 109.5 t)
- Fuel type: Coal
- Fuel capacity: 6 long tons 12 cwt (14,800 lb or 6.7 t)
- Water cap.: 4,200 imp gal (19,000 L; 5,000 US gal)
- Firebox
  - Grate area: 17 sq ft (1.6 m^{2})
- Boiler pressure: 180 psi (1.24 MPa)
- Heating surface
  - Firebox: 144 sq ft (13.4 m^{2})
  - Total surface: 1,529 sq ft (142.0 m^{2})
- Superheater
  - Heating area: 200 sq ft (19 m^{2})
- Cylinders: Two, inside
- Cylinder size: 20.5 in × 26 in (521 mm × 660 mm)
- Valve gear: Stephenson
- Valve type: Piston valves
- Valve travel: 9 in (229 mm)
- Train brakes: Westinghouse air brake
Performance figures
- Tractive effort: 21,435 lbf (95.35 kN)
- Factor of adh.: 4.15
Career
- Operators: CR • LMS
- Class: CR: 72
- Power class: LMS: 3P
- Number in class: 32
- Numbers: CR: 72-91, 66-71, 92-97; LMS: 14477-14508; BR: 54477-54508
- Nicknames: "Pickersgill Bogies"
- First run: May 1920
- Last run: October 1, 1962
- Withdrawn: 1953 (1), 1959-1962 (31)
- Disposition: All scrapped, replica planned

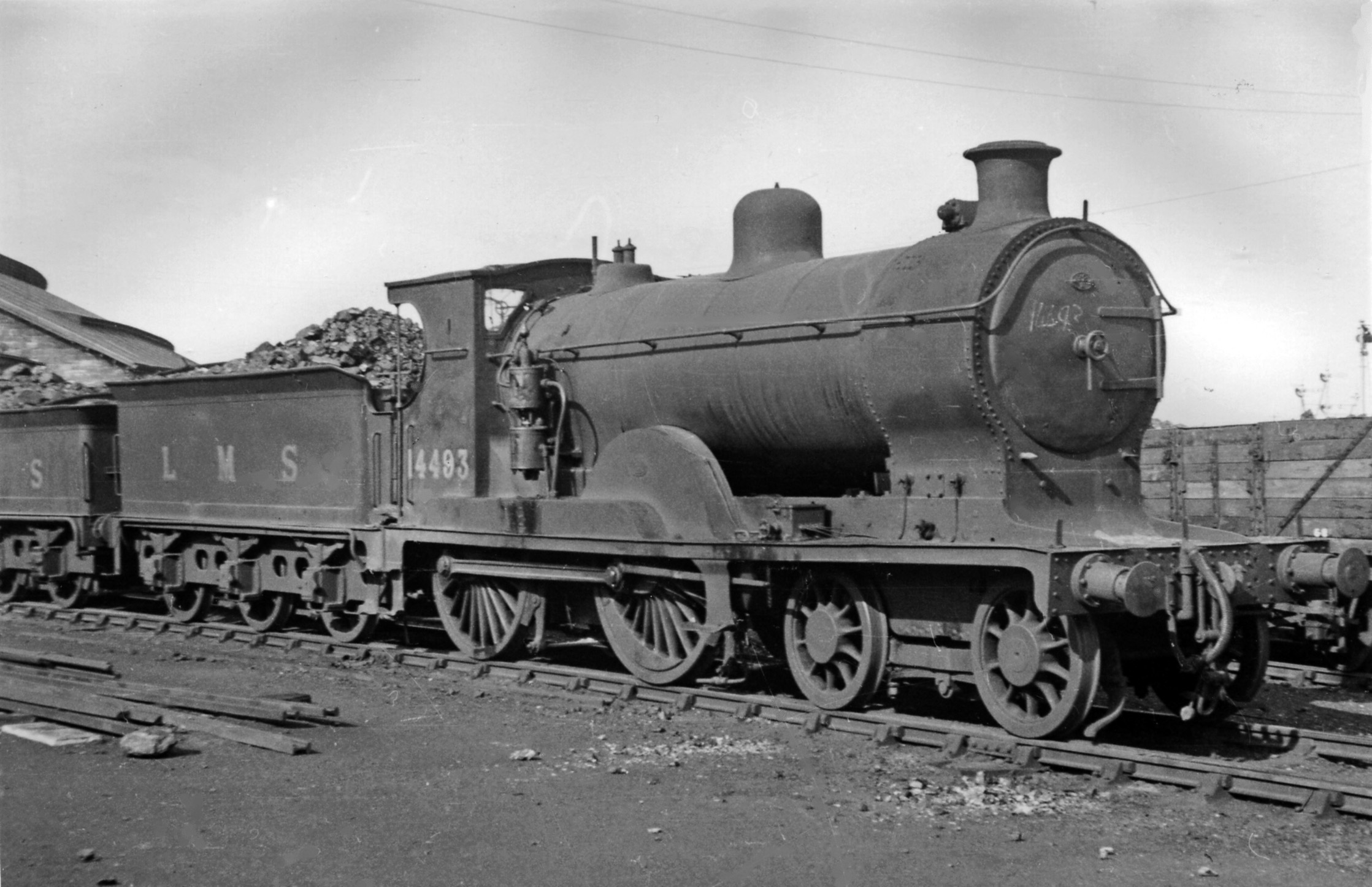
'72' class No. 14493 at Inverness Depot in 1948

The Caledonian Railway 72 Class was a class of 4-4-0 steam locomotives introduced by William Pickersgill for the Caledonian Railway (CR) in 1920. Thirty-two locomotives were built and all survived to be taken over by the London, Midland and Scottish Railway (LMS) in 1923 and by British Railways (BR) in 1948. The earlier 113 Class (introduced in 1916), of which 16 were produced, were similar but slightly smaller. These were the Caledonian's last express passenger locomotives, and technically, the last of the Dunalastair series, and were unofficially dubbed, Dunalastair V.

== Numbering ==
Year	Quantity	Manufacturer	Class	CR nos.	LMS nos.	BR nos.
1916	6	St. Rollox Works	113	113–116, 121, 124	14461–14466	54461–54466
1916	10	North British Locomotive Co. 21442–21451	113	928–937	14467–14476	54467–54476
1920	10	St. Rollox Works	72	72–81	14477–14486	54477–54486
1921	10	Armstrong Whitworth 111–120	72	82–91	14487–14496	54487–54496
1922	12	North British Locomotive Co. 22943–22954	72	66–71, 92–97	14497–14508	54497–54508

The two classes together totalled 48 locomotives. No. 54481 was scrapped after an accident at Gollafield Junction in 1953, the remainder were withdrawn between 1959 and 1962.

== Dimensions ==
Figures given in this section are from BR Database. Figures given by Rail UK are slightly different.

=== 72 Class ===
See box, top right.

=== 113 Class ===
See table below.

Introduced: 1916 
Total produced: 16
Locomotive weight: 61.25 long tons (62.23 t)
Boiler pressure: 175 psi (1.21 MPa)
Superheater: Yes
Cylinders: 20 in × 26 in (508 mm × 660 mm)
Driving wheel diameter: 6 ft 6 in (1,981 mm)
Valve gear: Stephenson
LMS/BR Power classification: 3P
Tractive effort: 19,833 lbf (88.22 kN)

== Preservation ==
Although no members of the class have been preserved, there are plans to construct a replica.

== See also ==
- Locomotives of the Caledonian Railway
- Locomotives of the London, Midland and Scottish Railway
