= GNSR Classes V and F =

Classes of British locomotives

GNSR classes V and F LNER D40 class
Type and origin
- Power type: Steam
- Designer: Class V: William Pickersgill; Class F: T. E. Heywood
- Builder: Class V: Neilson, Reid & Co. (5); GNSR Inverurie Works (8); Class F: North British Locomotive Co. (6); GNSR Inverurie Works (2)
- Build date: Class V: 1899–1915; Class F: 1920–1921
- Total produced: Class V: 13; Class F: 8
Specifications
- Configuration
  - Whyte: 4-4-0
  - UIC: 2'Bn (13) and 2'Bh (8)
- Gauge: 4 ft 8 1/2 in (1,435 mm)
- Leading dia.: 3 ft 9.5 in (1.156 m)
- Driver dia.: 6 ft 1 in (1.854 m)
- Loco weight: Class V: 46.35 long tons (47.1 t); Class F: 48.65 long tons (49.4 t)
- Tender weight: 37.4 long tons (38 t)
- Boiler pressure: 165 psi (1.14 MPa)
- Superheater: Class V: none; Class F: yes
- Cylinders: Two, inside
- Cylinder size: 18 × 26 in (452×660 mm)
- Valve gear: Stephenson, slide valves
Performance figures
- Tractive effort: 16,185 lbf (71.99 kN)
Career
- Operators: Great North of Scotland Railway; London and North Eastern Railway; British Railways
- Class: GNSR: V and F; LNER: D40
- Power class: BR: 2P until May 1953, then 1P
- Axle load class: Route Availability 4
- Retired: 1947–1958
- Preserved: No. 49
- Disposition: One preserved, remainder scrapped

The GNSR Classes V and F is a type of 4-4-0 steam locomotive built by Neilson, Reid & Co., Inverurie Works, North British Locomotive Co. and GNSR Inverurie Works for the Great North of Scotland Railway (GNSR). It consisted of GNSR class V (introduced in 1899 by William Pickersgill) and GNSR class F (introduced in 1920 by T. E. Heywood). The two classes were similar but the class F was superheated.

== Construction history ==
=== Class V ===
In February 1898, the Scottish locomotive builder Neilson, Reid and Company had completed an order for twelve 4-4-0 locomotives for the Great North of Scotland Railway (GNSR); these comprised GNSR class T. In October that year, William Pickersgill, the GNSR Locomotive Superintendent, requested authority to purchase a further twelve. Neilsons offered to build between ten and twenty further locomotives of the class T design. The GNSR Board of Directors granted permission for ten locomotives of a slightly modified design incorporating a side-window cab, and Neilson, Reid & Co. were awarded the contract that November (Neilsons order no. E827) at a price of £2,975 each. Delivery commenced in October 1899, but by the time that the first five locomotives had been received by the GNSR (class V; numbers 113–115, 25, 26), they found that a downturn in traffic meant that not only were the remaining five not required, but that they would also be unable to pay for them. Accordingly, the GNSR requested that Neilsons should find an alternative buyer, and to obtain the best possible price. They were duly sold to the South Eastern and Chatham Railway for £3,300 each, where they became that company's class G. An offer from the SECR to purchase the first five as well, but at £3,325 each, was turned down by the GNSR.

A further eight locomotives (in two batches of four) to the same design as the 1899 batch were built by the GNSR at their Inverurie Works, Aberdeenshire, in 1909–10 (nos. 27, 29, 31, 36) and 1913–15 (nos. 28, 33, 35, 34). Once again, Pickersgill's recommended quantities were reduced: he had requested ten in 1903, and eight in 1911.

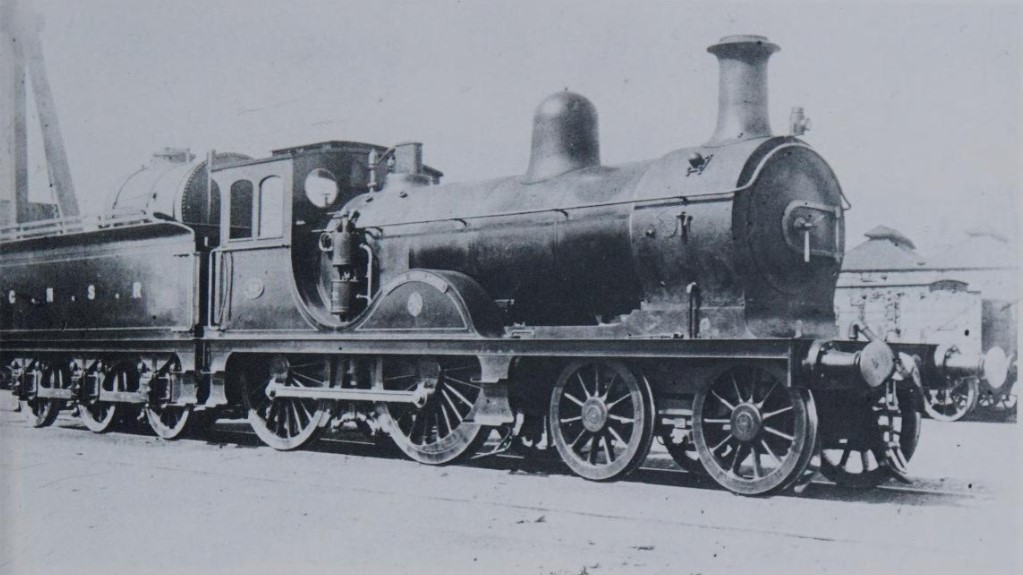
GNSR class F oiling burning

=== Class F ===
The class F locomotives were the only ones to be named by the GNSR, all other classes being numbered only. The class originally comprised eight locomotives, six built by the North British Locomotive Company in Glasgow in 1920, the remaining two by GNSR at Inverurie Works in 1921.

Year	Builder	GNSR No.	LNER No.	1946 No.	BR No.	Name
1921	Inverurie Works	45	6845	2273	62273	George Davidson
1921	Inverurie Works	46	6846	2274	62274	Benachie
1920	North British Loco	47	6847	2275	62275	Sir David Stewart
1920	North British Loco	48	6848	2276	62276	Andrew Bain
1920	North British Loco	49	6849	2277	62277	Gordon Highlander
1920	North British Loco	50	6850	2278	62278	Hatton Castle
1920	North British Loco	52	6852	2279	62279	Glen Grant
1920	North British Loco	54	6854	2280	—	Southesk

== South Eastern and Chatham Railway and Southern Railway ==
The five locomotives ordered in 1898 that the GNSR was unable to pay for were offered for sale by Neilsons, with the authority of the GNSR. On 11 October 1899, Neilsons contacted the South Eastern and Chatham Railway (SECR), which had recently placed a locomotive order with them. The SECR was an organisation which had been formed on 1 January 1899, and which was short of express passenger locomotives for the former London, Chatham and Dover Railway routes, which had a weight limit. The SECR quickly accepted the offer, paying £3200 each for them, whereas Neilsons would have charged the GNSR £2975 each; in December, the cost to the SECR was increased by a further £57 per engine and tender after Harry Wainwright, the SECR Locomotive Superintendent, requested modifications including the fitting of vacuum brake equipment. The price difference was split between Neilsons and the GNSR, the latter receiving £1025. On the SECR they were assigned Class G, and entered service during January and February 1900, numbered 676–680. They passed to the Southern Railway (SR) at the 1923 Grouping, and, except for no. 678, were given SR numbers A676–A680. They were withdrawn from service between 1924 and 1927.

== London and North Eastern Railway ==
All 21 GNSR locomotives passed to the London and North Eastern Railway in 1923. The LNER classed them all as D40 irrespective of whether they were fitted with superheaters (class F) or not (class V). The LNER initially renumbered them by adding 6800 to their GNSR number. In 1946 they completely renumbered all their locomotives and the D40 class became 2260–2261, 2265–2272, 2262–2264 (former class V) and 2273–2280 (former class F).

The first locomotive was withdrawn in 1947.

== British Railways ==
Eighteen of the 21 locomotives passed into British Railways ownership in 1948 (eleven former class V, and seven former class F). BR renumbered them by adding 60000 to their 1946 LNER number.

The last locomotive of the D40 class was 62277 Gordon Highlander and it was withdrawn in 1958 from Kittybrewster Depot, Aberdeen.

== Preservation ==
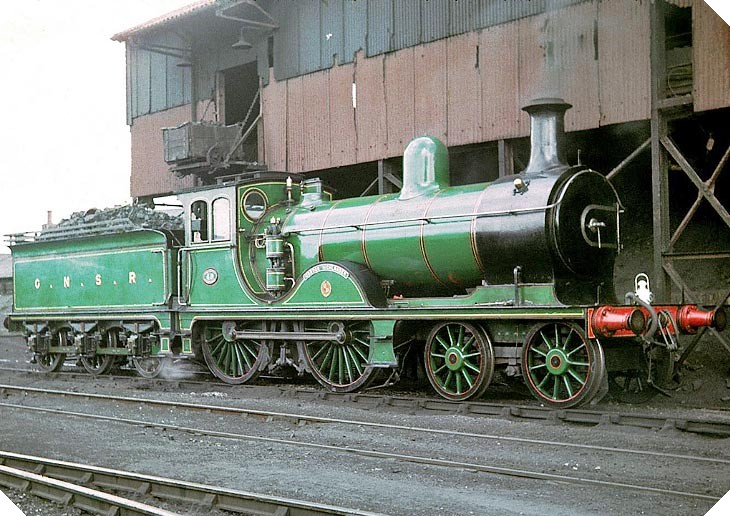
Gordon Highlander taking on coal in 1964

Number 62277 was preserved and renumbered as 49 as an example of the superheated version. GNSR No. 49, Gordon Highlander was also numbered as LNER No. 6849 at the Grouping, LNER No. 2277 in 1946 and BR No. 62277 on nationalisation. It was the last member of the class to be withdrawn from service. Restored to GNSR green in 1958 (though it never carried green livery in GNSR service since it originally appeared in Heywood's lined black), it was given an occasional airing on specials before retirement to the Glasgow Transport Museum. It was moved to the Museum of Scottish Railways at Bo'ness rather than the Riverside Museum.

On 13 June 1964, Gordon Highlander was used on the "Solway Ranger" railtour of Cumbria, on the section between Carlisle and Silloth.

== Sources ==
- Boddy, M. G.; Brown, W. A.; Fry, E. V.; Hennigan, W.; Manners, F.; Neve, E.; Tee, D. F.; Yeadon, W. B. (April 1968). Fry, E. V. (ed.). Locomotives of the L.N.E.R., Part 4: Tender Engines—Classes D25 to E7. Kenilworth: RCTS. ISBN 0-901115-01-0.
- Bradley, D.L. (March 1979) [1960]. The Locomotive History of the London, Chatham & Dover Railway (2nd ed.). London: RCTS. ISBN 0-901115-47-9.
- Casserley, H. C.; Johnston, S. W. (1974) [1966]. Locomotives at the Grouping 2: London and North Eastern Railway. Shepperton: Ian Allan Ltd. p. 31. ISBN 0-7110-0553-2.
- Casserley, H. C. (1974). The Observer's Book of British Steam Locomotives. London: Frederick Warne & Co. Ltd. ISBN 0-7232-1539-1. 23.
- Cook, A.F., ed. (1948). The ABC of British Locomotives, part 4: 60000-79999. London: Ian Allan Ltd. p. 19.
- Gordon, Hugh (2008). Great North of Scotland Railway Locomotives. Irwell Press Ltd. ISBN 978-1-903266-08-3.
- Williams, Peter (1974). Britain's Railway Museums. Ian Allan Ltd. p. 82.
