= Caledonian Railway 191 Class =

Class of 8 British 4-6-0 locomotives

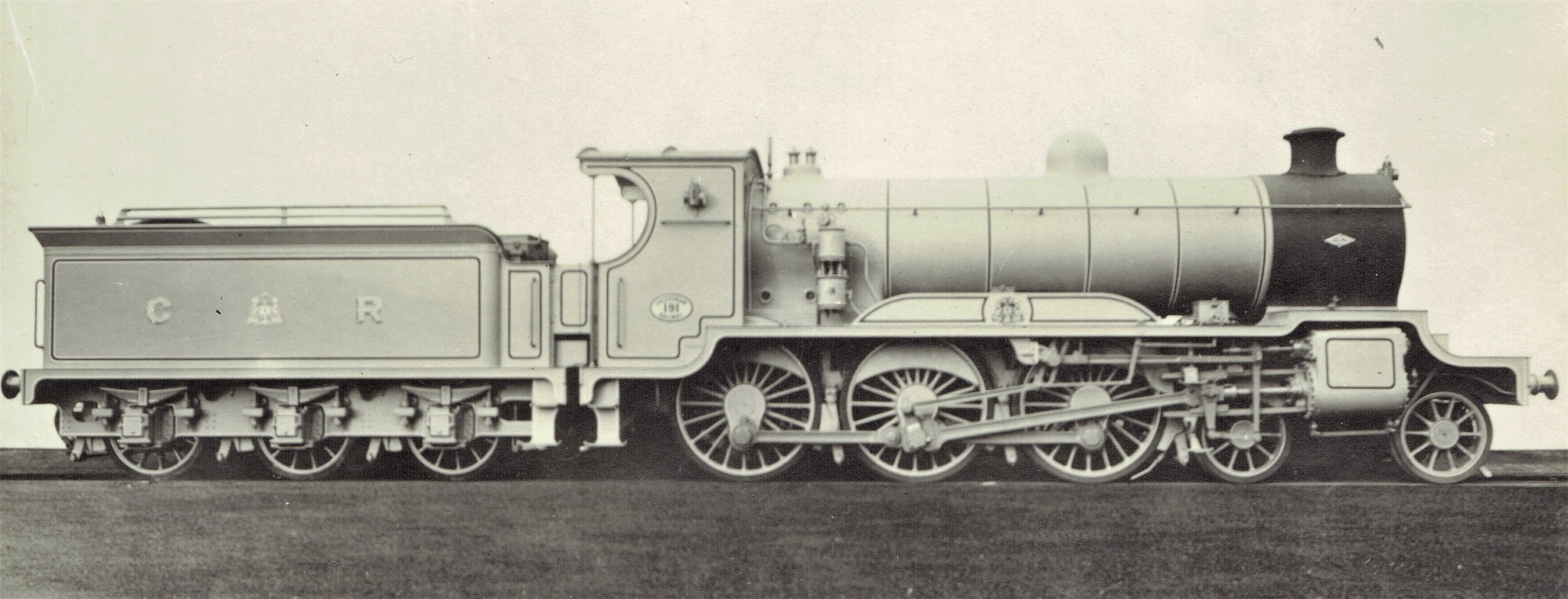
- Caledonian Railway 4-6-0 Nr. 191 (North British Locomotive Works, 22955/1922)
Type and origin
- Power type: Steam
- Designer: William Pickersgill
- Builder: North British Locomotive Company
- Serial number: NBL 22955–22962
- Build date: December 1922
- Total produced: 8
Specifications
- Configuration
  - Whyte: 4-6-0
  - UIC: 2′C n2
- Gauge: 4 ft 8 1/2 in (1,435 mm)
- Driver dia.: 5 ft 6 in (1.676 m)
- Loco weight: 62.75 long tons (63.76 t)
- Tender weight: 37.85 long tons (38.46 t)
- Boiler pressure: 185 lbf/in^{2} (1.28 MPa)
- Superheater: (none)
- Cylinders: Two, outside
- Cylinder size: 20 1/2 in × 26 in (521 mm × 660 mm)
- Valve gear: Walschaerts
Performance figures
- Tractive effort: 23,555 lbf (104.78 kN)
Career
- Operators: Caledonian Railway; London, Midland and Scottish Railway
- Class: CR: 191
- Power class: LMS: 3P
- Scrapped: 1939-1945
- Disposition: All scrapped

The Caledonian Railway 191 Class were 4-6-0 passenger engines designed by William Pickersgill and built in 1922 by the North British Locomotive Company. The class was intended for use on the Callander and Oban line, to augment the 55 Class 4-6-0s and replace elderly 179 Class 4-4-0s, and they were thus known as the New Oban Bogies, however, they were also used on other Caledonian lines.

== Reputation ==
The locomotives were not completely successful, having a reputation for being short of steam unless skillfully fired, and the dubious distinction of the highest total locomotive hammerblow of any locomotive class inherited by the LMS upon its formation in 1923. The lack of superheating was a curious omission from a type introduced as late as 1922. This may not have helped their steaming problems.

== Disposal ==
All were withdrawn and scrapped between 1939 and 1945, having been displaced by new Black Five 4-6-0s under the LMS's drive for standardisation.

Table of locomotives
CR no.	Works no.	Delivered	LMS no.	Scrapped
191	NBL 22955	December 1922	14619	November 1940
192	NBL 22956	December 1922	14620	October 1943
193	NBL 22957	December 1922	14621	December 1945
194	NBL 22958	December 1922	14622	November 1943
195	NBL 22959	December 1922	14623	December 1939
196	NBL 22960	December 1922	14624	February 1940
197	NBL 22961	December 1922	14625	February 1939
198	NBL 22962	December 1922	14626	April 1943
