= James Johnson (railway engineer) =

British railway engineer (19th century)

- Born: 1862; Bury, Lancashire
- Parent: Samuel Waite Johnson (father)
- Engineering career
- Discipline: Mechanical engineering

James Johnson (born 1862) was an English railway engineer who was Locomotive Superintendent of the Great North of Scotland Railway (GNSR) from 1890–94. He was the son of Samuel Waite Johnson, of Midland Railway fame. In 1892, he married Christina Sarah Louisa Drummond, daughter of Dugald Drummond.

== Locomotive designs ==
At the GNSR, he designed the locomotive classes listed below. Both classes survived into the ownership of the London and North Eastern Railway (LNER) in 1923.

- GNSR class R (LNER Class G10) 0-4-4T
- GNSR class S (LNER Class D41) 4-4-0

== See also ==
- Locomotives of the Great North of Scotland Railway

Business positions
Preceded by James Manson	Locomotive Superintendent of the Great North of Scotland Railway; 1890-1894	Succeeded by William Pickersgill
