= Garioch Heritage Centre =

Coordinates: 57.28894°N 2.37804°W

The Garioch Heritage Centre is a museum in Inverurie. It is owned by the Garioch Heritage Society.

== History ==
The Garioch Heritage Society was established in 1987.

The museum was opened in October 2017 in a former Inverurie Locomotive Works building, which closed in 1969. In 2018, the project was awarded "Best Creative re-use of an Industrial Building" by the Association for Industrial Archaeology. In March 2021, the society acquired the land on which the centre is located following a grant from the Scottish Land Fund.

== Exhibits ==
In October 2021, a cast-iron barge was recovered from the nearby Kirkwood Commercial Park. It is thought to be the last remaining barge that worked on the Aberdeenshire Canal. The barge is expected to form part of a new exhibition at the museum.

The museum has run temporary exhibitions, such as the Scottish Diaspora Tapestry in summer 2018.
