= Thomas Heywood (railway engineer) =

British engineer (1877–1953)

- Born: Thomas Edward Hett Heywood; 29 November 1877; Cardiff, Wales
- Died: 26 November 1953; Aberdeen, Scotland
- Engineering career
- Discipline: Mechanical engineering

Thomas Edward Hett Heywood (29 November 1877 – 26 November 1953) was a British engineer. During his career, he worked for the Taff Vale Railway, the Burma Railway Company, the Great North of Scotland Railway and the London and North Eastern Railway (LNER).

== Career ==
He trained at the Taff Vale Railway under Tom Hurry Riches and won a Whitworth Exhibition gold medal for engineering in 1899. He then worked as a draughtsman and inspector at Cardiff. In 1902, he became Assistant Locomotive, Carriage and Wagon Superintendent of the Burma Railway Company. After returning from Burma he again worked for the Taff Vale Railway as Junior Assistant Superintendent at Penarth Dock. In 1914, he became Locomotive Superintendent of the Great North of Scotland Railway. After the 1923 Grouping, Heywood's post ceased to exist but he became Running Superintendent of the Northern Scottish Area of the LNER.

== Innovations ==
Heywood expanded the use of superheating on the GNSR, and created a new class of superheated 4-4-0 locomotives which became the GNSR Classes V and F.

== Retirement and death ==
He retired in June 1942 and died at Aberdeen in November 1953.

Business positions
Preceded by William Pickersgill	Locomotive Superintendent of the Great North of Scotland Railway; 1914-1922	Succeeded by Post abolished
