= William Pickersgill =

William Pickersgill (1861 – 2 May 1928) was an English railway engineer, and was chief mechanical engineer of the Caledonian Railway from 1914 until Grouping in 1923. He was appointed locomotive superintendent of the Northern Division of the London, Midland and Scottish Railway but retired in 1925. He died in Bournemouth.

== Career ==
=== Great Eastern Railway ===
Pickersgill was born in Nantwich, Cheshire. He started work on the Great Eastern Railway at Stratford in 1876, where he was a Whitworth Exhibitioner, and after several posts in the running department he was appointed district locomotive superintendent in Norwich in 1891.

=== Great North of Scotland Railway ===
In 1894, he succeeded James Johnson as the locomotive superintendent of the Great North of Scotland Railway, where he continued to develop the 4-4-0 type for that railway and was responsible for the new locomotive works at Inverurie which replaced the unsatisfactory premises at Kittybrewster. He was chairman of the Association of Railway Locomotive Engineers in 1912 and was interested in flange and check rail dimensions.

=== Caledonian Railway ===
In March 1914 succeeded John F. McIntosh as locomotive, carriage & wagon superintendent of the Caledonian Railway. He further developed the McIntosh 4-4-0 type, introduced the class 60 4-6-0 for freight service, and an extraordinary 4-6-0 with derived motion which was highly unsuccessful.

=== London Midland and Scottish Railway ===
Following the Grouping, he was appointed mechanical engineer of the Northern Division of the London, Midland and Scottish Railway but retired in 1925.

== Locomotive designs ==
William Pickersgill's locomotive designs for the Great North of Scotland Railway included:

- GNoSR Class T 4-4-0: 26 built 1895–98 – became part of LNER class D41
- GNoSR class V 4-4-0: 18 built 1899–1915 – 5 sold new to South Eastern and Chatham Railway, becoming SECR G class; remainder became part of LNER class D40
- GNoSR class W 0-2-2 Railmotor: 2 built 1905

William Pickersgill's locomotive designs for the Caledonian Railway included:

- Caledonian Railway 191 Class 4-6-0 (3P)
- Caledonian Railway 60 Class 4-6-0 (4P)
- Caledonian Railway 956 Class 4-6-0 (5P)
- Caledonian Railway 113 class 4-4-0 Dunalastair V (3P)
- Caledonian Railway 72 Class 4-4-0 Dunalastair V (3P)
- Caledonian Railway 300 Class 0-6-0 (3F)
- Caledonian Railway 159 Class 0-4-4T (2P)
- Caledonian Railway 431 Class 0-4-4T (2P)
- Caledonian Railway 944 Class 4-6-2T (4P)

== See also ==
- Locomotives of the London, Midland and Scottish Railway

Business positions
Preceded by James Johnson	Locomotive superintendent of the Great North of Scotland Railway; 1894-1914	Succeeded by Thomas E. Heywood
Preceded by John F. McIntosh	Chief mechanical engineer of the Caledonian Railway; 1914-1923	Succeeded by George Hughes (LMS)
