= GNSR Classes X and Y =

Classes of British 0-4-2T locomotives

GNSR classes X and Y LNER classes Z4 and Z5
Type and origin
- Power type: steam
- Builder: Manning Wardle
- Build date: 1915
- Total produced: Class X: 2 Class Y: 2
Specifications
- Configuration
  - Whyte: 0-4-2T
- Gauge: 4 ft 8 1/2 in (1,435 mm)
- Driver dia.: Class X: 3 ft 6 in (1.067 m); Class Y: 4 ft 0 in (1.219 m)
- Trailing dia.: Class X: 2 ft 6 in (0.762 m); Class Y: 2 ft 9 in (0.838 m)
- Wheelbase: Class X: 11 ft 1 in (3.4 m); Class Y: 12 ft 9 in (3.9 m)
- Length: 23 ft 4 in (7.1 m)
- Axle load: Class X: 9.6 long tons (9.8 t); Class Y: 13.85 long tons (14.1 t)
- Loco weight: Class X: 25.85 long tons (26.3 t); Class Y: 30.9 long tons (31.4 t)
- Fuel type: Coal
- Fuel capacity: 1 long ton (1.02 t)
- Water cap.: Class X: 400 gallons Class Y: 450 gallons
- Boiler pressure: 160 psi (1.10 MPa)
- Heating surface
  - Firebox: Class X: 48 sq.ft Class Y: 54 sq.ft
  - Tubes: Class X: 450 sq.ft Class Y: 546 sq.ft
- Cylinders: Two, outside
- Cylinder size: Class X: 13 in × 20 in (330 mm × 508 mm); Class Y: 14 in × 20 in (356 mm × 508 mm)
- Valve gear: Stephenson
Performance figures
- Tractive effort: Class X: 10,945 lbf (48.69 kN); Class Y: 11,105 lbf (49.40 kN)
Career
- Operators: Great North of Scotland Railway; London and North Eastern Railway; British Railways
- Class: GNSR: X and Y LNER: Z4 and Z5; BR:
- Retired: 1956-1960
- Preserved: None
- Disposition: Scrapped

The GNSR Classes X and Y were two similar classes of 0-4-2T steam locomotives built by Manning Wardle for the Great North of Scotland Railway. The two classes were similar, and were used throughout their lives to shunt on the docks at Aberdeen. They passed to the London and North Eastern Railway at the 1923 grouping, and received the LNER classification Z5. The Class X were later reclassified Z4.

== History ==
When the Aberdeen Harbour Commissioners finally agreed to allow steam locomotives to replace horses on the Aberdeen docks, the GNSR purchased two 0-4-2T locomotives from Manning Wardle for the purpose. These were designated Class Y and numbered 114 and 115. On delivery these were found to be 2 tons over the maximum weight for operating on the docks, and a further two locomotives of similar design were acquired. These Class X locomotives, numbered 116 and 117, had smaller driving wheels and a shorter wheelbase. In order to reduce the weight of the Class Y locos, they initially operated with their tanks only partially filled.

Both classes remained almost unchanged throughout their working lives which involved working the 1.75-mile (2.82 km) long branch from Kittybrewster to Waterloo Docks in Aberdeen, local trips, and hire to nearby industry. They remained in the GNSR livery of black with red and yellow lining until painted unlined black during World War II, although they gained the letters LNER and subsequently acquired BR emblems. The locos also retained their original boilers, there being no spares. Except when on hire to industrial concerns, the locomotives were shedded at Kittybrewster.

The first loco to be withdrawn was 68193 in 1956, followed by 68191 in 1959. The remaining two locos were withdrawn in 1960.

== Classification and numbering ==
After the grouping both the Class X and Class Y became LNER Class Z5. This was changed in 1927 when the Class X was redesignated LNER Class Z4.

Number history
Class	X		Y	
GNSR number	114	115	116	117
GNSR 1915 renumbering	43	44	30	32
LNER number	6843	6844	6830	6832
LNER 1946 renumbering	8190	8191	8192	8193
BR number	68190	68191	68192	68193
Withdrawal date	28-04-1960	31-03-1959	28-04-1960	21-04-1956
Total mileage	457,000	525,000	255,000	196,000
