= Caledonian Railway 300 Class =

British steam locomotive class (1918–1920)

Caledonian Railway 300 class
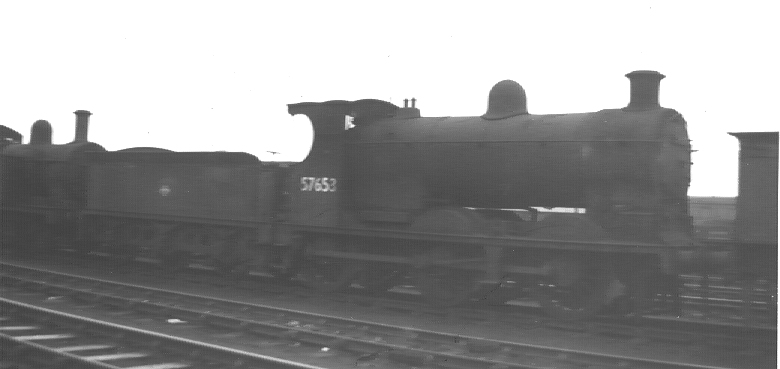
- 57653 at Carlisle in British Railways days
Type and origin
- Power type: Steam
- Designer: William Pickersgill
- Order number: Y119-Y120, Y122-Y123
- Build date: 1918–1920
- Total produced: 43
Specifications
- Configuration
  - Whyte: 0-6-0
  - UIC: C
- Gauge: 4 ft 8 1/2 in (1,435 mm) standard gauge
- Driver dia.: 5 ft 0 in (1.524 m)
- Wheelbase: 16 ft 9 in (5.105 m)
- Loco weight: 49.25 long tons (50.04 t; 55.16 short tons)
- Fuel type: Coal
- Water cap.: 3,000 imp gal (14,000 L; 3,600 US gal)
- Boiler pressure: 170 lbf/in^{2} (1.17 MPa)
- Cylinders: Two, inside
- Cylinder size: 18.5 in × 26 in (470 mm × 660 mm)
- Valve gear: Stephenson
Performance figures
- Tractive effort: 21,437 lbf (95.4 kN)
Career
- Operators: CR, LMS, BR
- Class: CR: 300
- Power class: LMS/BR: 3F
- Number in class: 1 January 1923: 43; 1 January 1948: 29
- Numbers: CR: 294–324, 280–281, 670–679; LMS: 17650–17692; BR: 57650–57692
- Delivered: 02/1918
- Withdrawn: 1934–1939, 1961–1963
- Disposition: All scrapped

The Caledonian Railway 300 Class were freight 0-6-0 tender engines introduced in 1918 and designed by William Pickersgill. Forty-three were built between 1918 and 1920. They were numbered 294–324, 280, 281, 670–679 by the Caledonian Railway.

== Design ==
The locomotives were based on the Caledonian Railway 30 Class, a superheated version of the Caledonian Railway 652 Class, both designed by John F McIntosh. They were introduced between 1918 and 1920 at St. Rollox Works, Glasgow, being built in a series of 4 batches (St. Rollox Lot No. Y119-Y120, Y122-Y123). The cylinders were 1 in (2.5 cm) narrower than the 30 Class, though the wheelbase, wheel spacing and wheel diameter was the same.

The 300 Class would have several variations of the basic design during production. These would mainly involve superheating and the inclusion of piston or slide valves, with each combination of valves and boiler being constructed. Visually, the locomotives looked similar to the 30 Class, with the main differences being the absence of the raised front running board in front of the smokebox and cylinders and the wing plates on the side of the smokebox.

The first 12 members of the class (300-311) were constructed with steel fireboxes. Later locomotives would have copper fireboxes and the steel fireboxes on these members would be replace with copper ones by 1922. In 1925, No. 305 and 317 (Now renumbered LMS 17661 and 17673 respectively) were fitted with vacuum ejectors. This was so that they could use continuous vacuum brakes on compatible rolling stock, primarily passenger trains.

== Ownership changes ==
All passed to the London, Midland and Scottish Railway (LMS) in 1923, being classified 3F and renumbered 17650–17692, along with gaining additional lamp irons. 29 passed into British Railways stock in 1948 and had 40000 added to their LMS numbers.

== Numbering table ==
| CR nos. | Quantity | LMS nos. | BR nos. (Note 1) |
|---|---|---|---|
| 294-324 | 31 | 17650-17680 | 57650-57680 |
| 280-281 | 2 | 17681-17682 | 57681-57682 |
| 670-679 | 10 | 17683-17692 | 57683-57692 |

Note 1

Not all the BR numbers were actually applied because some engines had been withdrawn before 1948. They were withdrawn between 1934 and 1963, and all were scrapped.

== Withdrawal ==
The first withdrawal of the class was LMS 17657 (CR 302) in Nov 1934 after a service life of 16 years, 9 months. 14 class members would be withdrawn between 1934 and 1939 before pausing due to the Second World War. LMS 17687 (CR 674) and 17662 (CR 306) were withdrawn in March and July 1939 but reinstated by the in 1940 before being withdrawn again after the war.

The remaining 29 entered BR ownership from 1st Jan 1948. Withdrawals restarted in 1961 and all would be withdrawn over the next two years, with the final two, BR 57679 (LMS 17679, CR 323) and BR 57688 (LMS 17688, CR 675), withdrawn on the 29th of Nov 1963.

== See also ==
- Locomotives of the Caledonian Railway
- Caledonian Railway 812/652 Class
- Caledonian Railway 439 Class
