= Caledonian Railway 60 Class =

Class of 6 British 4-6-0 locomotives

Caledonian Railway 60 Class (details for original CR batch)
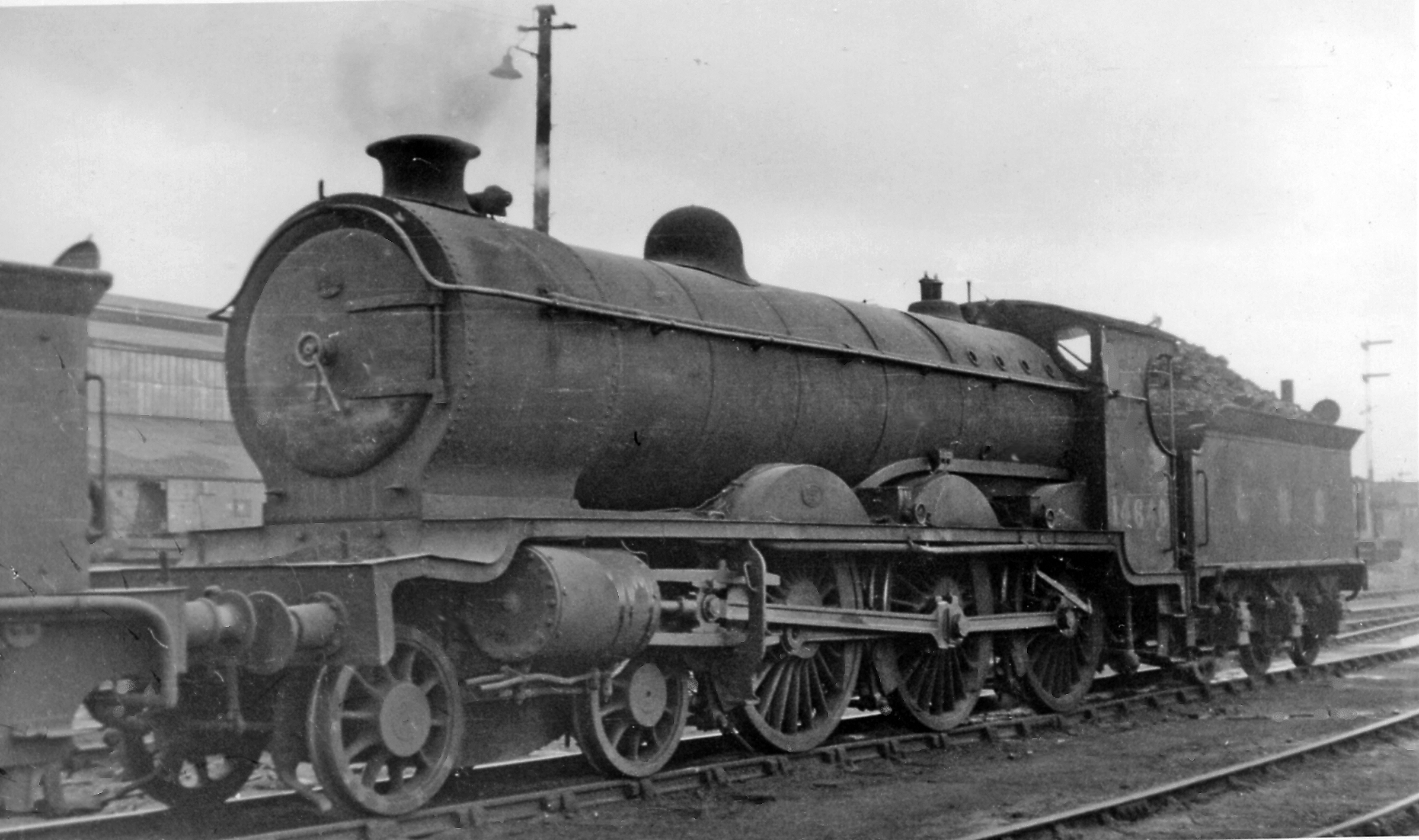
- Pickersgill/Hughes 4P 4-6-0 No. 14640 at Motherwell Locomotive Depot, 15 August 1948.
Type and origin
- Power type: Steam
- Designer: William Pickersgill
- Builder: St. Rollox Works
- Order number: Y115, Y116
- Build date: November 1916 – April 1917; July 1925 – December 1926
- Total produced: 26
Specifications
- Configuration
  - Whyte: 4-6-0
  - UIC: 2′C h2
- Gauge: 4 ft 8 1/2 in (1,435 mm) standard gauge
- Leading dia.: 3 ft 6 in (1.067 m)
- Driver dia.: 6 ft 1 in (1.854 m)
- Loco weight: 75 long tons (76 t; 84 short tons)
- Tender weight: 46.5 long tons (47.2 t; 52.1 short tons)
- Fuel type: Coal
- Boiler pressure: 175 lbf/in^{2} (1.21 MPa)
- Heating surface: 1,676 sq ft (155.7 m^{2})
- Superheater
  - Type: Robinson
  - Heating area: 258.3 sq ft (24.00 m^{2})
- Cylinders: Two, outside
- Cylinder size: 20 in × 26 in (508 mm × 660 mm)
- Valve gear: Stephenson
- Valve type: Piston valves
Performance figures
- Tractive effort: 21,795 lbf (96.95 kN)
Career
- Operators: Caledonian Railway; → London, Midland and Scottish Railway; → British Railways
- Class: CR: 60
- Power class: LMS: 4P
- Numbers: CR: 60–65; LMS: 14630–14655
- Withdrawn: 1944 (1), 1946–1953
- Disposition: All scrapped

The Caledonian Railway 60 Class were 4-6-0 passenger engines designed by William Pickersgill and introduced in 1916. Six locomotives were constructed by the Caledonian Railway at its St. Rollox works between 1916 and 1917, all of which transitioned to LMS (London, Midland and Scottish Railway) ownership in 1923. An additional twenty locomotives, featuring slight design modifications, were produced under the direction of George Hughes for the LMS between 1925 and 1926.

While the 60 Class locomotives were robust and free-steaming, they were also unsophisticated and exhibited lethargic performance given their size. Although initially classified as passenger locomotives by the LMS, they were frequently deployed on goods trains in later years. This shift in usage earned them the nickname Greybacks, likely referencing their long, grimy boilers. Alternatively, the nickname may have been an insult coined by former Glasgow and South Western Railway enginemen, as "greyback" was an old term for a louse.

Withdrawals began in 1944, but twenty-three locomotives entered British Railways in 1948. The final locomotives were withdrawn and scrapped in 1953.

== Numbering and locomotive histories ==
CR no.	LMS no.	BR no.	Built	Works	Withdrawn	Notes
	14630	54630	7/1925	St Rollox	12/1951	
	14631	54631	11/1925	St Rollox	5/1948	BR number never carried
	14632		1/1926	St Rollox	7/1947	
	14633		5/1926	St Rollox	3/1946	
	14634	54634	5/1926	St Rollox	11/1952	
	14635	54635	6/1926	St Rollox	1/1952	
	14636	54636	6/1926	St Rollox	2/1953	
	14637	54637	7/1926	St Rollox	3/1948	BR number never carried
	14638	54638	7/1926	St Rollox	5/1951	
	14639	54639	8/1926	St Rollox	12/1953	
	14640	54640	8/1926	St Rollox	10/1952	
	14641	54641	9/1926	St Rollox	11/1948	BR number never carried
	14642	54642	9/1926	St Rollox	10/1949	
	14643	54643	10/1926	St Rollox	2/1948	BR number never carried
	14644	54644	10/1926	St Rollox	4/1948	BR number never carried
	14645	54645	11/1926	St Rollox	7/1950	BR number never carried
	14646	54646	11/1926	St Rollox	3/1949	BR number never carried
	14647	54647	11/1926	St Rollox	3/1951	
	14648	54648	12/1926	St Rollox	11/1951	
	14649	54649	12/1926	St Rollox	10/1951	
60	14650	54650	11/1916	St Rollox	9/1953	
61	14651	54651	12/1916	St Rollox	3/1950	
62	14652	54652	1/1917	St Rollox	11/1948	BR number never carried
63	14653	54653	2/1917	St Rollox	7/1949	BR number never carried
64	14654	54654	3/1917	St Rollox	1/1952	
65	14655		4/1917	St Rollox	1/1944	

sources Longworth (2005) and RailUK

== Technical details ==
=== Pickersgill Caledonian Railway design ===
See box, top right.

=== Hughes LMS development of Pickersgill design ===
The locomotives built by the LMS had slightly larger cylinders and weighed slightly less than the original CR locomotives. Details were as for the CR locomotives except:

- Introduced: 1925
- Boiler Pressure: 180 psi (1,200 kPa)
- Two cylinders: 20.5 in × 26 in (521 mm × 660 mm)
- Loco Weight: 74.75 long tons (75.95 t)
- Tender Weight: 41.5 long tons (42.2 t)
- Starting tractive effort: 22,900 lbf (102 kN)
