= GNSR Classes S and T =

Classes of British 4-4-0 locomotives

GNSR classes S and T LNER D41 class
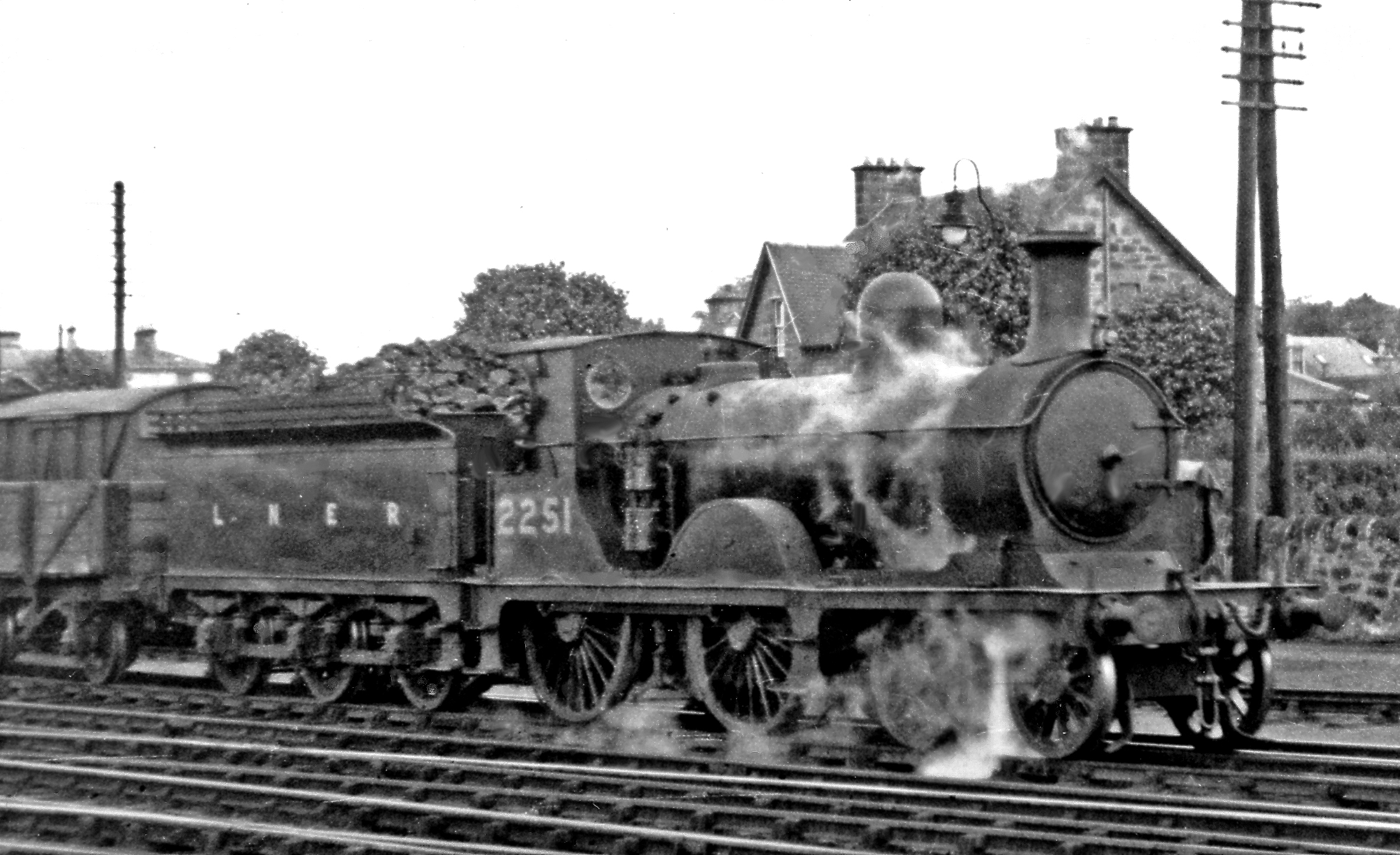
- No. 2251 at Elgin station 26 August 1948
Type and origin
- Power type: Steam
- Designer: Class S: James Johnson; Class T: William Pickersgill
- Builder: Neilson and Company
- Build date: 1893–1898
- Total produced: 6 Class S, 26 Class T
Specifications
- Configuration
  - Whyte: 4-4-0
- Gauge: 4 ft 8 1/2 in (1,435 mm)
- Leading dia.: 3 ft 9.5 in (1.156 m)
- Driver dia.: 6 ft 1 in (1.854 m)
- Loco weight: Class S: 43 long tons 18 hundredweight (44.6 t); Class T: 45 long tons (45.7 t)
- Boiler pressure: 165 psi (1.14 MPa)
- Cylinders: Two, inside
- Cylinder size: 18 × 26 in (452×660 mm)
- Valve gear: Stephenson, slide valves
Performance figures
- Tractive effort: 16,184 lbf (71.99 kN)
Career
- Operators: Great North of Scotland Railway; London and North Eastern Railway; British Railways
- Class: GNSR: S & T LNER/BR: D41
- Power class: BR: 2P
- Retired: 1946–1953
- Disposition: All scrapped

The GNSR Classes S and T is a type of 4-4-0 steam locomotive built by Neilson and Company for the Great North of Scotland Railway (GNSR). The class consisted of two similar GNSR classes: 'S' (introduced in 1893 and designed by James Johnson) and 'T' (introduced in 1895 and designed by William Pickersgill). The two classes were similar but with detail differences to the boiler.

== Construction history ==
=== Class S ===
In December 1893 six locomotives were supplied by Neilson (works nos. 4640–4646) and were numbered 78–83.

=== Class T ===
Between December 1895 and February 1898 a further twenty six locomotives were supplied in two batches by Neilson (works nos. 4877-90 and 5212–23), fitted with a larger boiler. Nine of these had been reboilered between 1916 and 1923, making them indistinguishable from the 'S' class, and the remainder were similarly reboilered by the London and North Eastern Railway (LNER) after 1923. The LNER therefore treated them all as a single class, 'D41'.

== British Railways ==
The first locomotive was withdrawn in 1946, but 22 locomotives passed into British Railways ownership in 1948. BR renumbered them by adding 60000 to their 1946 LNER number.

The last locomotive was withdrawn in 1953, and all have been scrapped.
