= Kittybrewster =

Area in Aberdeen, Scotland

Coordinates: 57.1580°N 2.1119°W

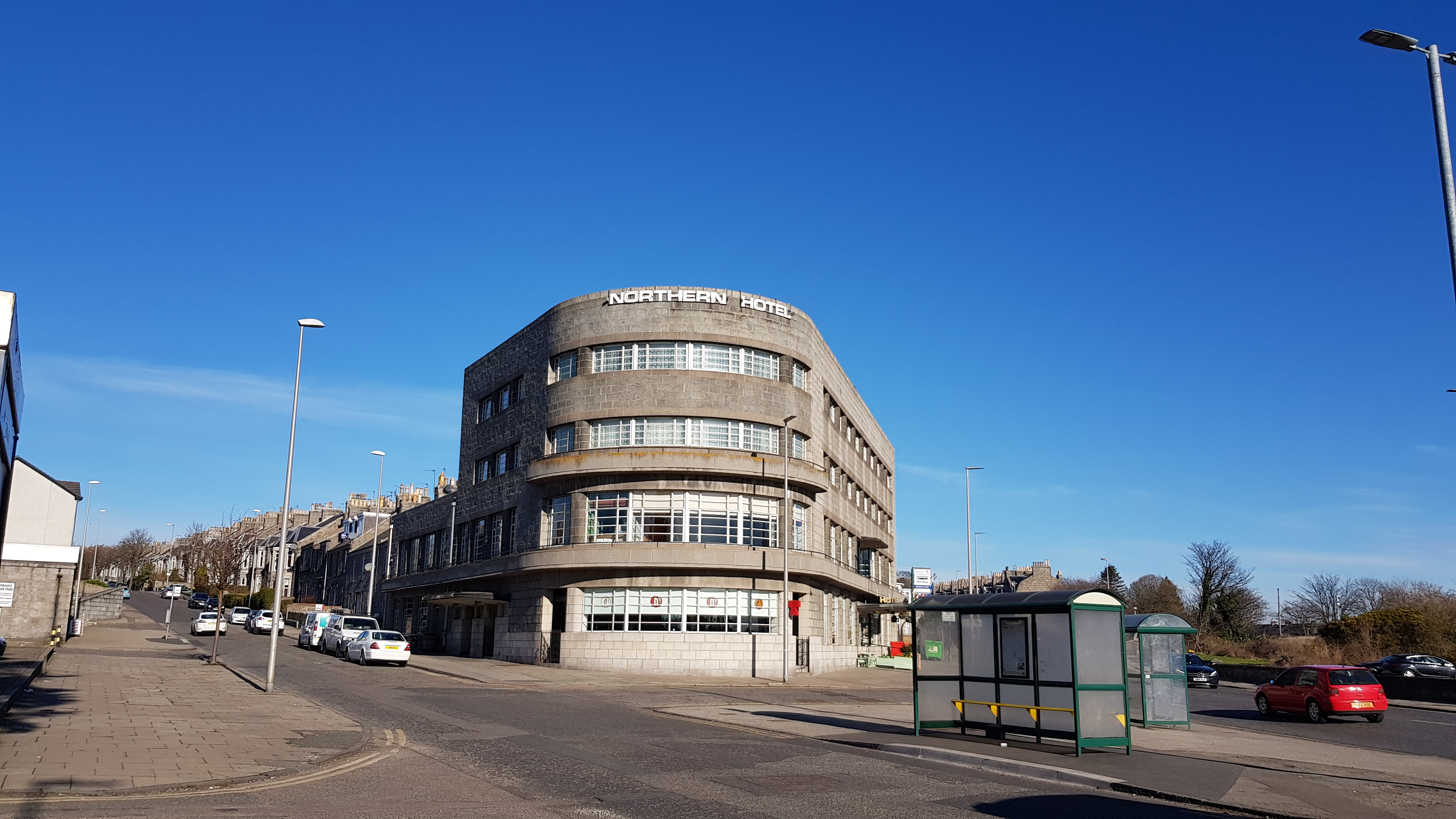
- The A-listed Northern Hotel

- Location within the Aberdeen City council area Location within Scotland
- OS grid reference: NJ933074
- Council area: Aberdeen City
- Lieutenancy area: Aberdeen
- Country: Scotland
- Sovereign state: United Kingdom
- Post town: ABERDEEN
- Postcode district: AB24, AB25
- Dialling code: 01224
- Police: Scotland
- Fire: Scottish
- Ambulance: Scottish
- UK Parliament: Aberdeen North
- Scottish Parliament: Aberdeen Central

Kittybrewster is an area within Aberdeen, Scotland, north of the city centre and roughly southwest of Old Aberdeen.

== Transport ==
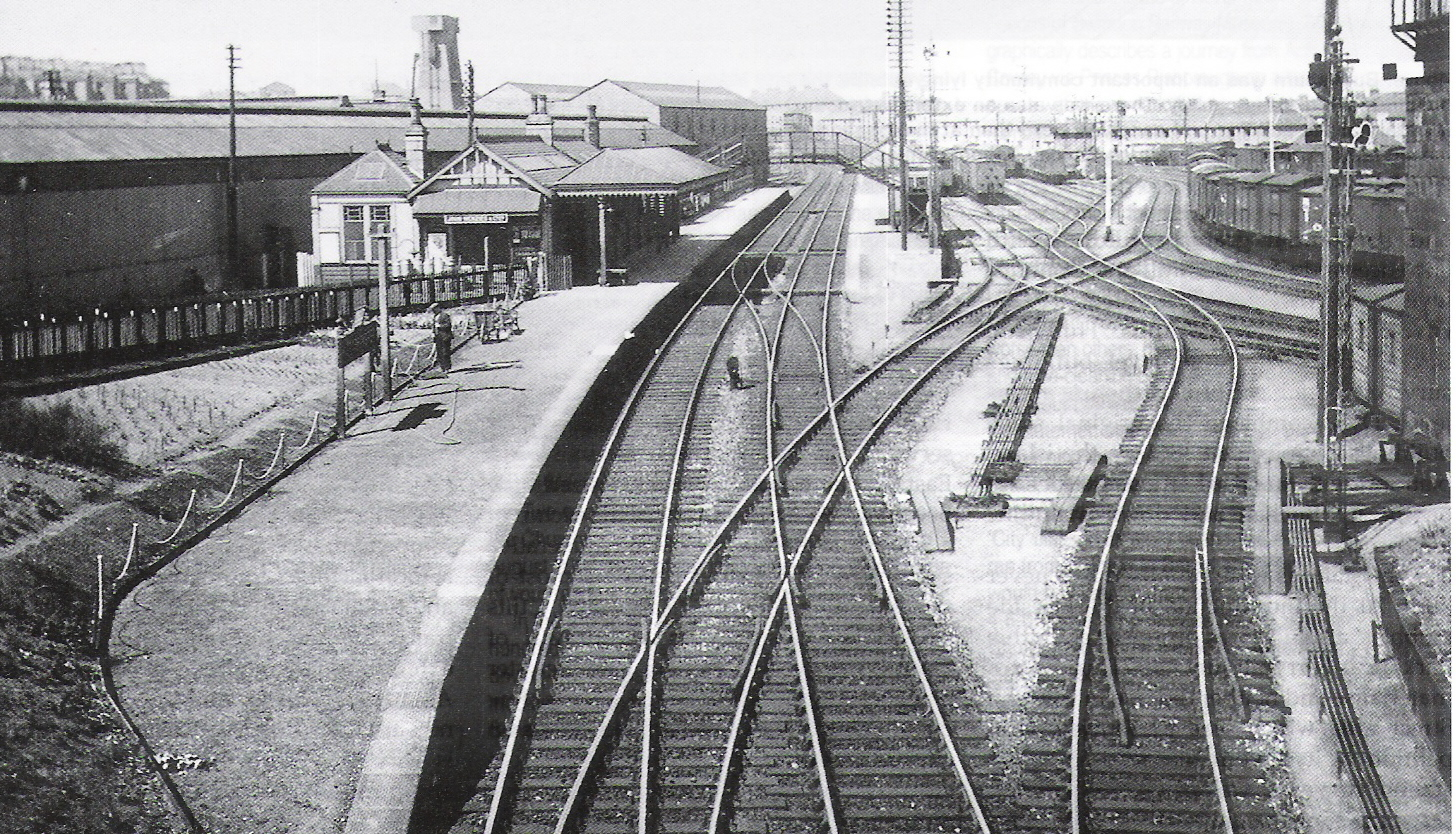
Kittybrewster station & freight yards, before their closure in 1968

Within the area the A9012 road joins the A978 road; there are also several railway tracks, one of which follows the route of the Aberdeenshire Canal. The name Kittybrewster has been given to three railway stations over the years, including Aberdeen's original main railway station for routes to the north (on the Great North of Scotland Railway). All three stations are now gone, although the route north continues.

== Facilities ==
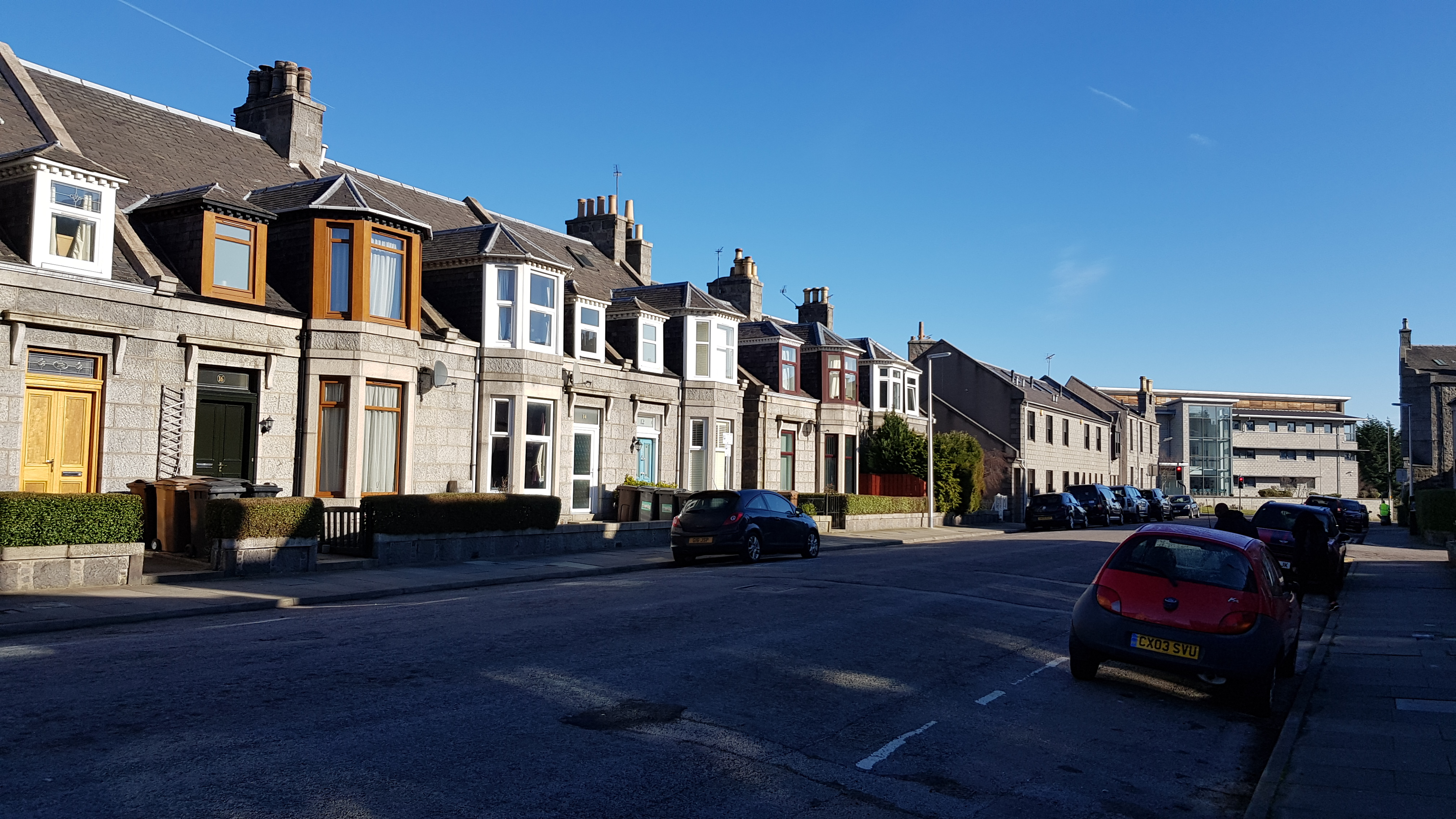
Kittybrewster

The area now contains a small number of bars, the Kittybrewster and Woodside Bowling Club, Kittybrewster Primary School, two retail parks (on the sites of former railway yards), a council depot (on the site of one of the old and closed railway stations) and the Category A listed moderne-styled Northern Hotel.

== Notable people ==
- Sir John Arbuthnot, 1st Baronet (1912–92), born at Powis House, Kittybrewster, took the name as his territorial designation when he became a baronet in 1964.

== See also ==
- Aberdeen Kittybrewster railway station
- Arbuthnot baronets
