= Wanlockhead railway station =

Former railway station in Scotland

Coordinates: 55.3944°N 3.7790°W

Wanlockhead

General information
- Location: South Lanarkshire; Scotland
- Grid reference: NS 87419 12607
- Platforms: 1

Other information
- Status: Disused

History
- Pre-grouping: Caledonian Railway
- Post-grouping: London Midland and Scottish Railway

Key dates
- 19 September 1902: Open to freight
- 1 October 1902: Station opens to passengers
- 31 December 1938: Last passenger train
- 2 January 1939: Line officially closed to passengers and goods

Wanlockhead railway station was opened on 1 October 1902 as the terminus on the Leadhills and Wanlockhead Light Railway and served the lead mining area, farms and the village of Wanlockhead. Elvanfoot railway station in South Lanarkshire was the junction for the branch and was located on the west coast main line. It remained open until 2 January 1939 for passengers and freight. When Wanlockhead station opened in 1902, a year after Leadhills station, it became the highest standard gauge adhesion station in the United Kingdom at 1,413 ft (431 m), 7 miles 24 chains (11.7 kilometres) from Elvanfoot.

== History ==
Operated by the Caledonian Railway, it became part of the London, Midland and Scottish Railway during the Grouping of 1923. The line had been closed and lifted before the Scottish Region of British Railways came into existence upon nationalisation in 1948. The line suffered greatly from the closure of the lead mines and passenger traffic was slight, although the station was located near to the small village of Wanlockhead.

To save money, the platform was only slightly raised at Wanlockhead. It was demarcated by a wooden fence. Carriages were fitted with three levels step board which folded down to enable passengers to alight and board at the station.

The station had a 100 yd (91 m) passing loop, a single siding served a loading bank and a goods shed. The waiting room, stationmaster's office, ticket office and men's toilet were located in a wooden lean-to building built along the long side of the goods shed. No signals were present, however a telephone was provided. The points were worked manually by the train crews as there wasn't a signal box. In 1916 a new siding was installed at the north side of the line.

The line officially closed to all traffic on 2 January 1939. By April 1939, the track had been lifted and all buildings at the station demolished.

== Reuse ==
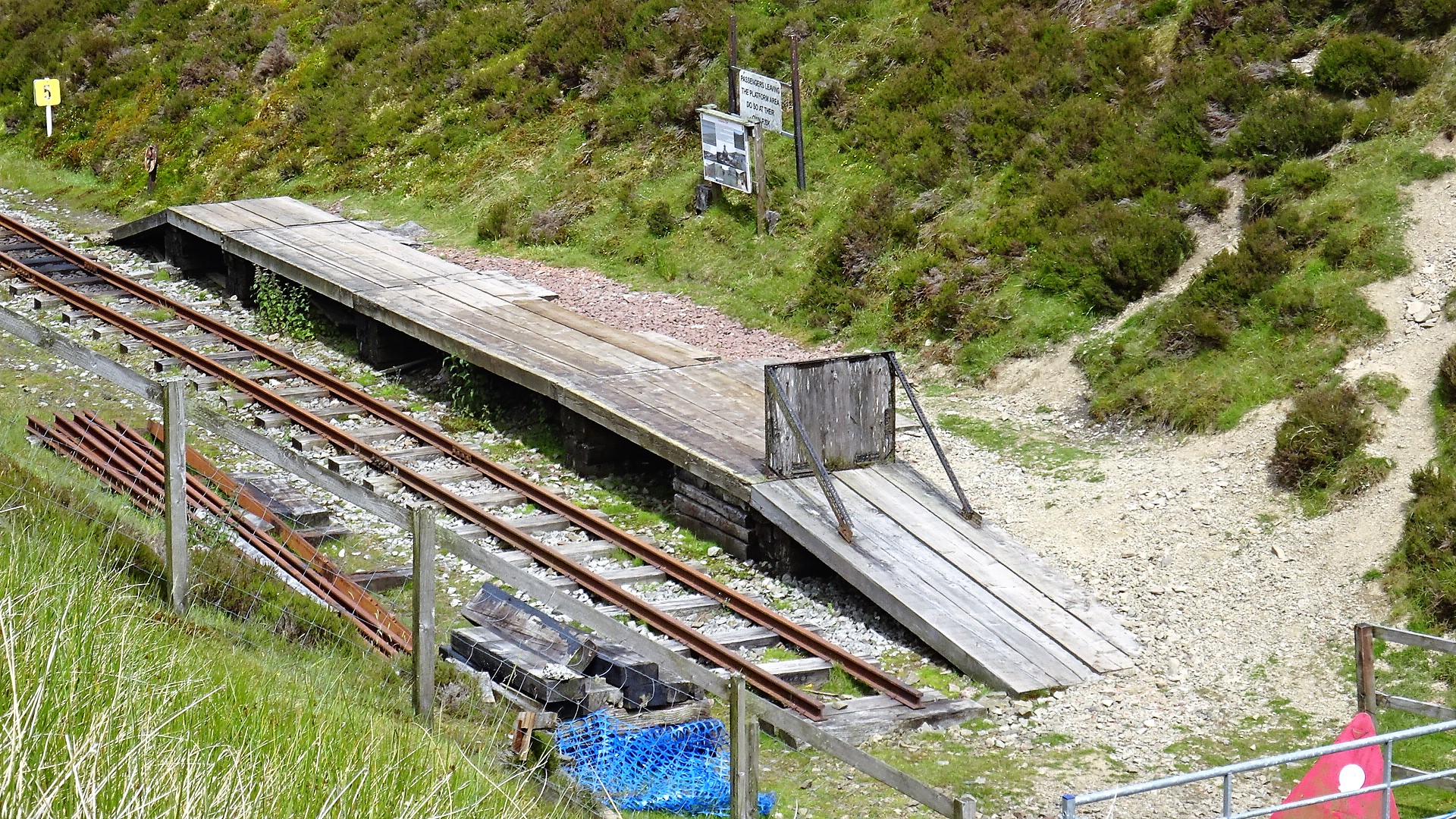
Glengonnar Halt, terminus of the narrow gauge line.

The Leadhills and Wanlockhead Railway narrow gauge line and station are to be extended from Glengonnar Halt towards the site of the old station and its trackbed in the near future (datum 2019).

Preceding station	Historical railways	Following station
Leadhills	Caledonian Railway; Leadhills and Wanlockhead Branch	Terminus
