= Giffey =

Giffey is an English surname. Notable people with the surname include:

- Brian Giffey (1887–1967), British intelligence operative
- Franziska Giffey (born 1978), German politician
- Niels Giffey (born 1991), German basketball player

== See also ==
- Giffen
