= Leadhills and Wanlockhead Railway =

Railway in South Lanarkshire, Scotland

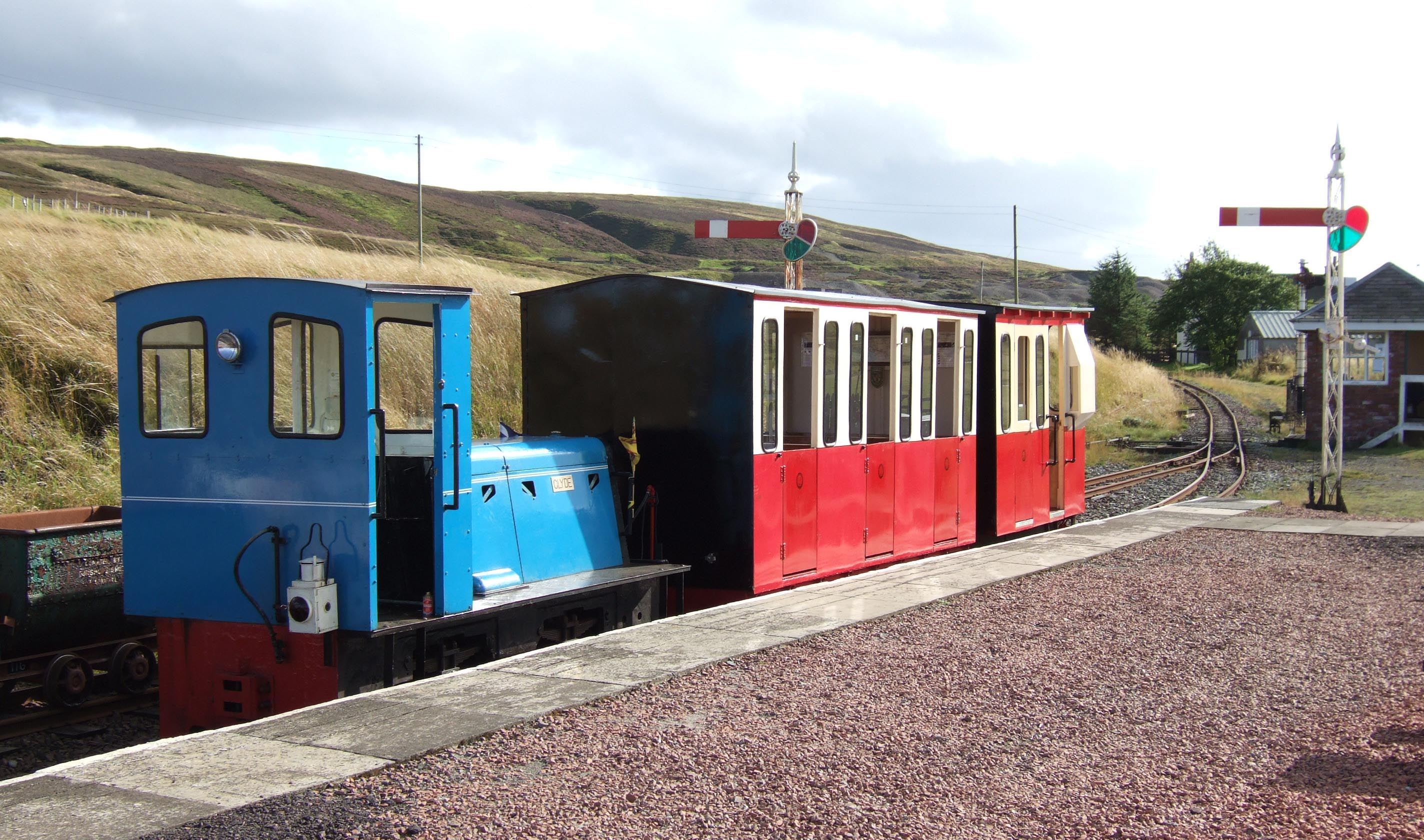
- Locomotive No.6 Clyde with typical train at Leadhills station

Overview
- Headquarters: Leadhills
- Locale: Scotland
- Dates of operation: 1986–present

Technical
- Track gauge: 2 ft (610 mm)

Other

The Leadhills and Wanlockhead Railway is a 2 ft (610 mm) narrow gauge railway in South Lanarkshire, Scotland. It is laid on the trackbed of the former Leadhills and Wanlockhead Branch of the Caledonian Railway which led off the main line between Carlisle and Glasgow at Elvanfoot.

== Overview ==
The preserved section runs from Leadhills for about 1 kilometre (0.6 mi) towards Wanlockhead and is the highest adhesion railway in the UK. The rack and pinion Snowdon Mountain Railway is higher. Trains are currently diesel worked with the locomotive propelling the train up hill away from Leadhills.

The original railway closed in the late 1930s shortly after the mines in Wanlockhead had closed.

The railway currently stops at the border of South Lanarkshire and Dumfries and Galloway.

Point	Coordinates (Links to map resources)	OS Grid Ref	Notes
End of line	55.4125°N 3.7572°W	NS88851458	
Leadhills	55.4113°N 3.7608°W	NS88621445	
Glengonnar Halt	55.4022°N 3.7694°W	NS88051345	

== Operation ==
Trains operate on the push-pull principle as there are no run round loop facilities at the end of the run. Movements within the main station site at Leadhills are controlled from the reconstructed signal box which contains the original lever frame from Arrochar and Tarbet signal box.

=== Bus replacement ===
For two weeks during July 2016 the railway operated an extended service, connecting with local bus routes, as the road between Wanlockhead and Leadhills was closed for repairs.

=== Awards ===
The Leadhills & Wanlockhead won the Heritage Railway Association Annual Awards 2016, Small Groups

== See also ==
- British narrow gauge railways

== Bibliography ==
- Thomas, Cliff (2002). The Narrow Gauge in Britain & Ireland. Atlantic Publishers. ISBN 1-902827-05-8.
- Keggans, Sandie (2004). Transporting the Lead. Wanlockhead Museum Trust. ISBN 0-9530645-3-0.
