= Leadhills railway station =

Former railway station in Scotland

Coordinates: 55.4113°N 3.7608°W

Leadhills

General information
- Location: South Lanarkshire; Scotland
- Grid reference: NS 88619 14460
- Platforms: 1

Other information
- Status: Disused

History
- Pre-grouping: Caledonian Railway
- Post-grouping: London Midland and Scottish Railway

Key dates
- 1 October 1901: Station opens
- 31 December 1938: Last passenger train
- 2 January 1939: Line officially closed to passengers and goods

Leadhills railway station was opened on 1 October 1901 as the intermediate stop on the Leadhills and Wanlockhead Light Railway and served the lead mining area, farms and the village of Leadhills circa 5.5 miles (8.9 km) WSW of Elvanfoot railway station in South Lanarkshire until 2 January 1939 for passengers and freight. Until Wanlockhead station opened Leadhills was the highest standard gauge adhesion station in the United Kingdom.

== History ==
Operated by the Caledonian Railway, it became part of the London, Midland and Scottish Railway during the Grouping of 1923. The line had been closed and lifted before the Scottish Region of British Railways came into existence upon nationalisation in 1948. The line suffered greatly from the closure of the lead mines and passenger traffic was slight, although the station was located conveniently near to the small village. Coal traffic had continued to the end.

== Infrastructure ==
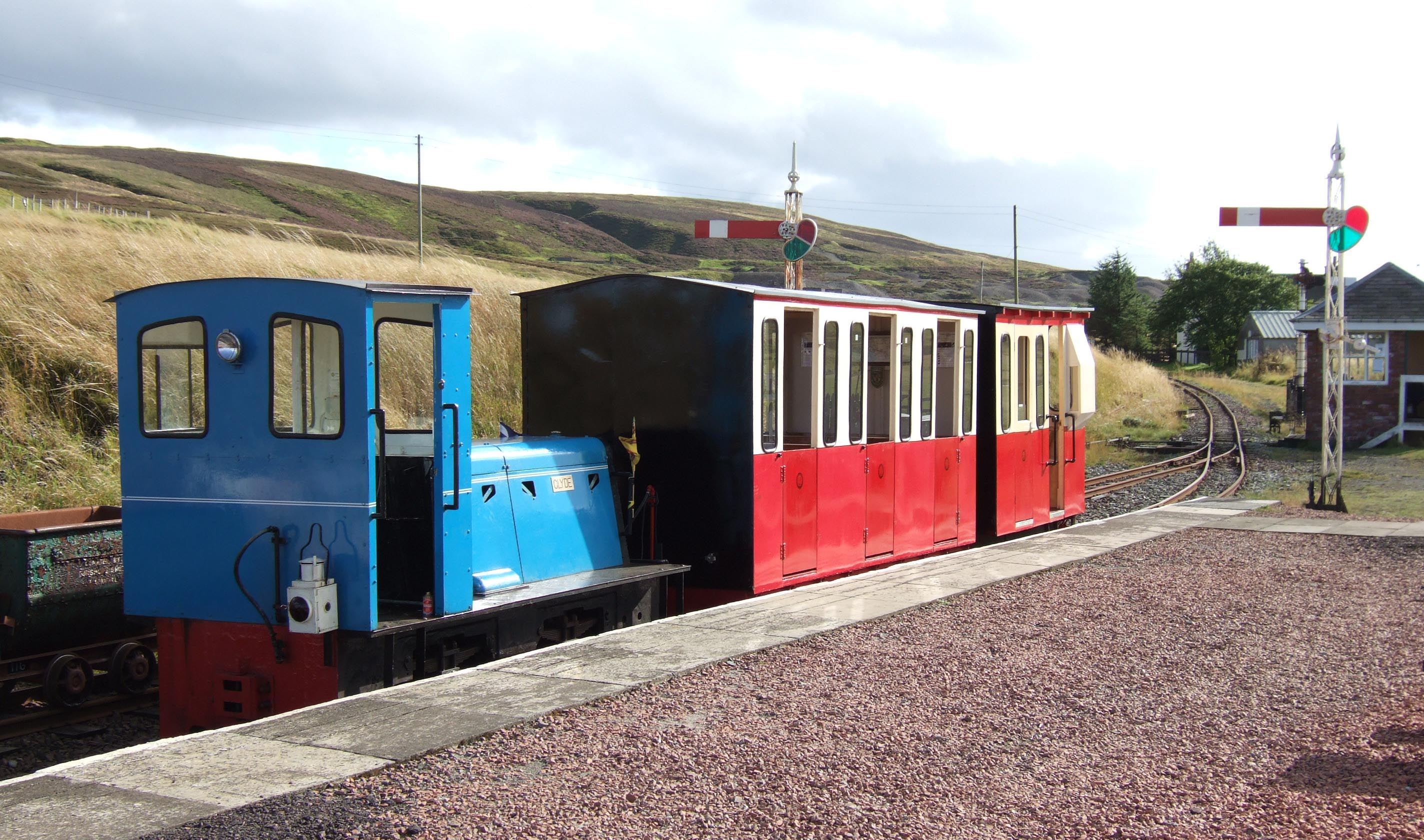
The new narrow gauge station was opened in 2000.

To save on costs the passenger stations at Leadhills and Wanlockhead had only slightly raised platforms and therefore passenger carriages had three levels of step board fitted which folded down to enable passengers to board and depart.

This platform at Leadhills was demarcated by a wooden fence and a passing loop of 100 yards (91 m) length with catch points was provided as was a three ton capacity crane. A siding served a loading bank and another the goods shed. The waiting room, stationmaster's office, ticket office and men's toilet were located in a wooden lean-to building built along the long side of the goods shed. No signals were present, however a telephone was provided. and the points were worked by ground frames in the absence of a signal box.

The engine shed and water tower stood to the east, 5 miles 37.1 chains (8.79 kilometres) from Elvanfoot.

== The site today ==
The track had already been lifted by April 1939 and the buildings demolished. The Leadhills and Wanlockhead Railway narrow gauge line and station have been constructed on the site of the old station and its trackbed.

Preceding station	Historical railways	Following station
Elvanfoot	Caledonian Railway; Leadhills and Wanlockhead Branch	Wanlockhead
