= Ben O'Connor =

Ben O'Connor may refer to:

- Ben O'Connor (hurler) (born 1979), Irish hurling coach and former player
- Ben O'Connor (ice hockey) (born 1988), British ice hockey player
- Ben O'Connor (cyclist) (born 1995), Australian road cyclist

== See also ==
- Ben Connor (born 1992), British runner
- Benjamin Connor (1813-1876), British railway engineer
