= Elvanfoot railway station =

Former railway station in Scotland

Elvanfoot
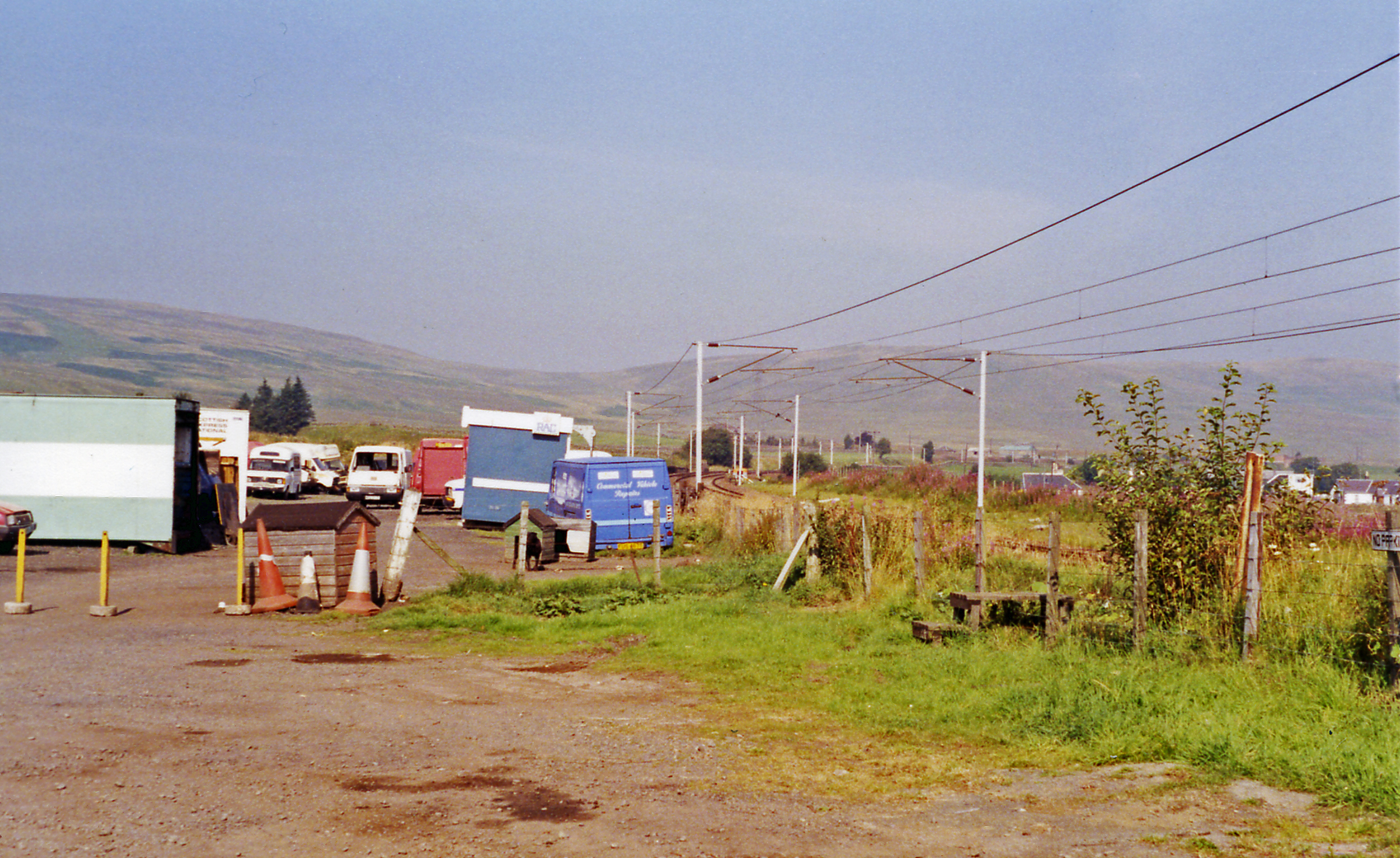
- Site of the station in 1991

General information
- Location: Elvanfoot, South Lanarkshire; Scotland
- Coordinates: 55.4371°N 3.6536°W
- Platforms: 2

Other information
- Status: Disused

History
- Original company: Caledonian Railway
- Pre-grouping: Caledonian Railway
- Post-grouping: London Midland and Scottish Railway

Key dates
- 15 February 1848: Opened
- 4 January 1965: Closed
Location

Elvanfoot railway station was a station which served Elvanfoot, in the Scottish county of South Lanarkshire. It was served by local trains on what is now known as the West Coast Main Line.

== History ==
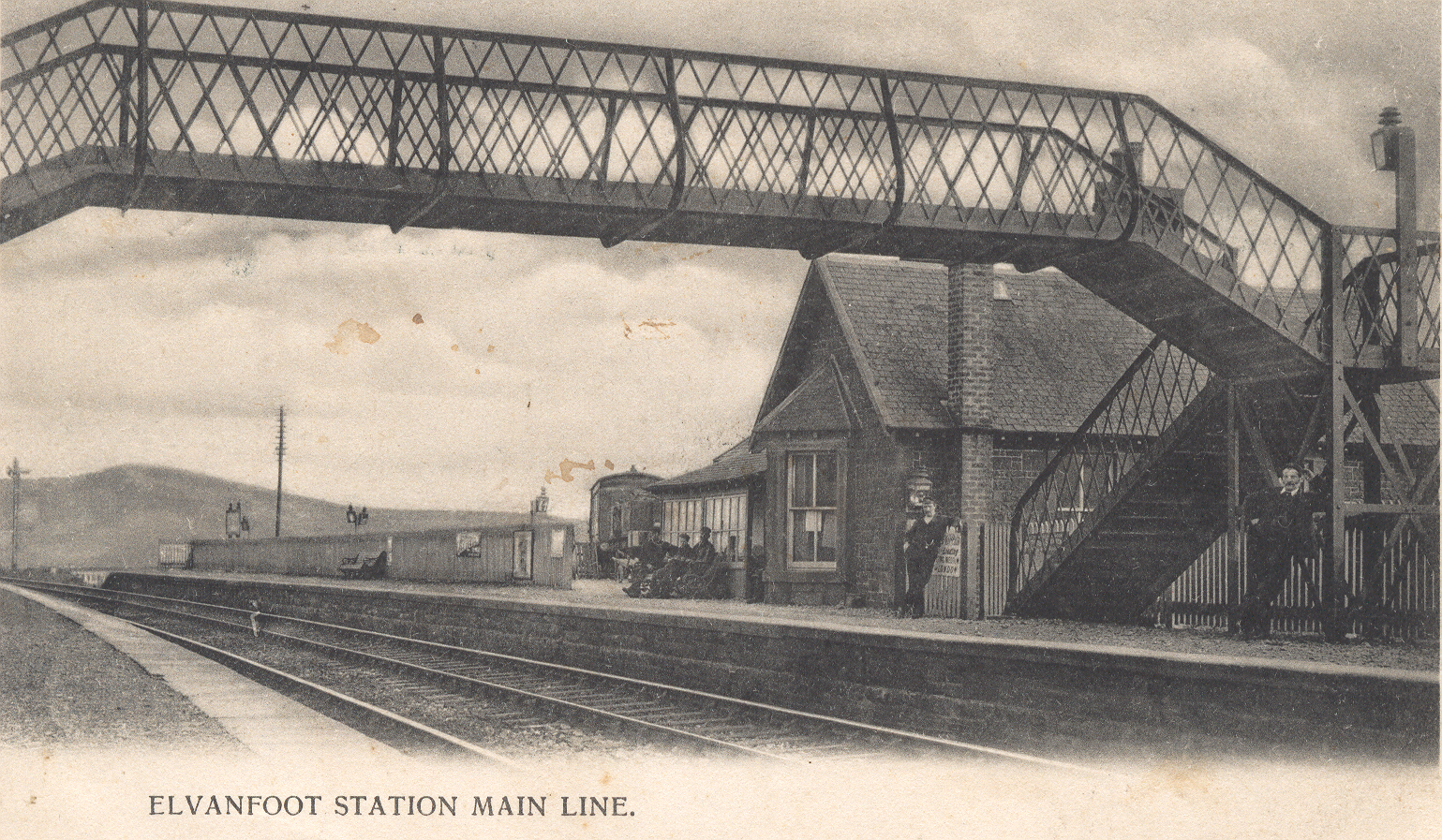
Elvanfoot railway station before the 1916 signalbox was built

Opened by the Caledonian Railway, it became part of the London Midland and Scottish Railway during the Grouping of 1923. A 6-sided signalbox was built in 1916.

Between 1901 and 1938, Elvanfoot was the junction for the branch to Wanlockhead.

Preceding station	Historical railways	Following station
Beattock Summit; Line open; Station closed	Caledonian Railway; Main Line	Crawford; Line open; Station closed
Leadhills; Line and Station closed	Caledonian Railway; Leadhills and Wanlockhead Branch	Terminus

== Current operations ==
Trains pass at speed on the electrified West Coast Main Line. Also at this location is a feeder station from the National Grid. Very few remnants of the station are still visible on the site.
