= Caledonian Railway 670 Class =

Type and origin
- Power type: Steam
- Designer: George Brittain
- Build date: 1878-1881
- Total produced: 30
Specifications
- Configuration
  - Whyte: 0-4-2
- Gauge: 4 ft 8 1/2 in (1,435 mm) standard gauge
- Driver dia.: 5 ft 0 in (1.524 m)
- Loco weight: 34.6 long tons (35.2 t; 38.8 short tons)† 36.95 long tons (37.54 t; 41.38 short tons)††
- Boiler pressure: 140 psi (970 kPa)†; 150 psi (1,000 kPa)††
- Cylinders: Two, outside
- Cylinder size: 17 in × 24 in (432 mm × 610 mm)
- Valve gear: Stephenson
Performance figures
- Tractive effort: 13,756 lbf (61.19 kN)†; 14,739 lbf (65.56 kN)††
Career
- Operators: CR • LMS
- Class: CR: 670
- Power class: LMS: Unclassified
- Withdrawn: 1922-1932
- Disposition: All scrapped

The Caledonian Railway 670 Class was a class of 0-4-2 steam locomotives designed by George Brittain for the Caledonian Railway (CR) and introduced in 1878.

== Ownership changes ==
Nine locomotives were withdrawn in 1922, or earlier. Twenty-one survived into the ownership of the London, Midland and Scottish Railway (LMS) in 1923; these were withdrawn between 1923 and 1932.

== Numbering ==
| CR nos. | Quantity | LMS nos. | Notes |
|---|---|---|---|
| Various | 7 | 17000-17006 | † |
| Various | 14 | 17007-17020 | †† |

Notes

- † locos with 140 psi pressure
- †† locos with 150 psi pressure
