= Crawford railway station (Scotland) =

Former railway station in Scotland

Crawford
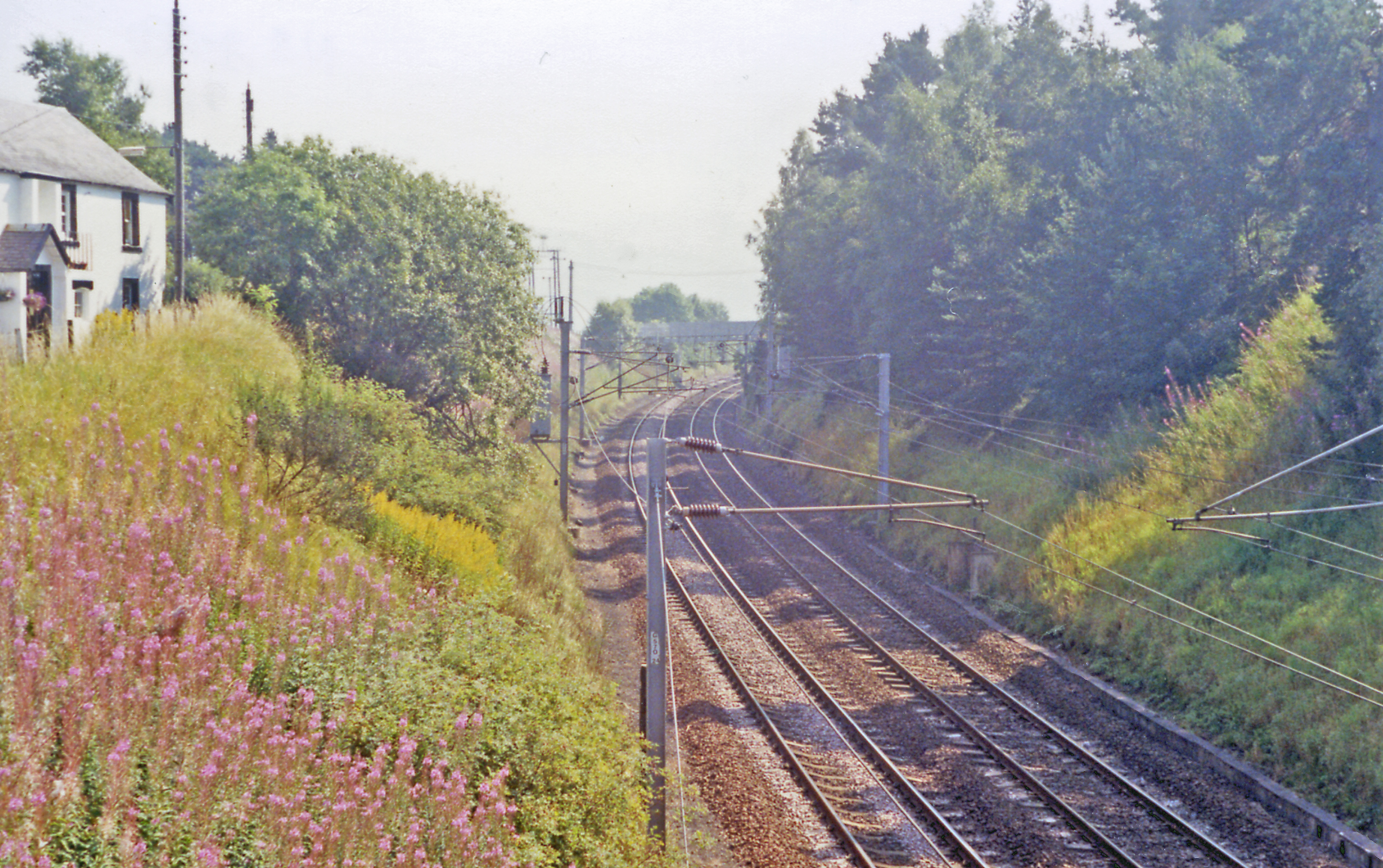
- Site of the station in 1991

General information
- Location: Crawford, South Lanarkshire; Scotland
- Coordinates: 55.4707°N 3.6524°W
- Platforms: 2

Other information
- Status: Disused

History
- Original company: Caledonian Railway
- Pre-grouping: Caledonian Railway
- Post-grouping: London Midland and Scottish Railway

Key dates
- 1 November 1891: Station opens
- 4 January 1965: Station close
Location

Crawford railway station was a station which served the village of Crawford, near Abington, in the Scottish county of South Lanarkshire. It was served by local trains on what is now known as the West Coast Main Line.

== History ==
Opened by the Caledonian Railway, it became part of the London Midland and Scottish Railway during the Grouping of 1923. It was closed by British Railways.

Preceding station	Historical railways	Following station
Elvanfoot; Line open; Station closed	Caledonian Railway; Main Line	Abington; Line open; Station closed

== Accidents and incidents ==
- On 2 April 1909, a passenger train became divided and was derailed due to the failure of the crank axle on the locomotive hauling it. A few passengers suffered minor injuries.

== The site today ==
Trains pass at speed on the electrified West Coast Main Line but there is no station at the site now.
