= George Brittain =

- Born: 1821; Chester, England
- Died: 1882 (aged 60–61)
- Spouse: Margaret Grant
- Children: Louisa Mary Brittain and four others
- Engineering career
- Discipline: Mechanical engineering

George Brittain (1821, in Chester – 1882) was an English railway engineer, and was Locomotive Superintendent of the Caledonian Railway from 1876 to 1882, between Benjamin Connor and Dugald Drummond.

Previously he had been locomotive superintendent of the Dundee, Perth and Aberdeen Junction Railway (1859–63) and assistant to Alexander Allan on the Scottish Central Railway (1863–65). Outdoor superintendent, Caledonian Railway (1865–76) and assistant/deputy to the incumbent and ailing Conner.

In common with many of his professional contemporaries he described himself as a civil engineer in 1861 and 1871 but as a mechanical engineer (locomotive superintendent) in 1881.

== Locomotive designs ==
On his own account, he was responsible for the management of the design of:

- 10 x 2-4-0 [1878]
- 30 x 0-4-2 [1878-1882] (Caledonian Railway 670 Class)
- 10 x 4-4-0 [1882] (Caledonian Railway 179 Class)
- 12 x 2-4-0T [1879] (Tank locomotive)
- 1 x 2-2-2WT [1881]
- 15 x 2-4-2T [1880]
- 1 x 0-4-0CT (Crane tank)
- 6 x 0-6-0ST

About 30 of these locomotives saw their way into the stock of the London, Midland and Scottish Railway, some possibly gaining an extended lease of life due to the demands on the railway caused by the Great War. All had outside cylinders.

Most of his engines had a reasonable service life for the period but were ill-suited for the age of standardisation that swept the country from the mid-1870s onwards.

== Later years ==
Seen more as a running man than a designer and innovator, and with failing health and support from the board of directors that had appointed him, he was sidelined in a reorganisation of his department and appointed consultant, before resigning his £850/annum post in April 1882. He died shortly afterwards.

== Family ==
He married Margaret Grant, a Scot, by whom he had at least five children, all born in Carlisle, Cumberland. His eldest daughter, Louisa Mary Brittain, married Andrew T. Scott on 7 June 1897 at St. John's Episcopal Church, Perth.

== See also ==
- Locomotives of the Caledonian Railway

== Sources ==
- British Locomotive Catalogue 1825–1923 Vol.4, B Baxter
- Forty Years of Caledonian Locomotives 1882–1922, H J Campbell Cornwell
- Scottish Locomotive History 1831–1923, C Highet
- Caledonian Railway, O. S. Nock
- The Locomotive (1946)
- Scottish census returns

Business positions
Preceded by Benjamin Connor	Locomotive Superintendent of the Caledonian Railway; 1876–1882	Succeeded by Dugald Drummond
