= Thomas Hill (businessman) =

Scottish railway magnate and chairman (1825–1891)

- Born: April 7, 1813; Edinburgh, Scotland
- Died: April 26, 1888 (aged 75); Villa Jean, Cannes, France
- Occupations: businessperson, railways
- Known for: Chairman of the Caledonian Railway

Thomas Hill (1825–1891) was a Scottish businessman who was a railway magnate and chairman of the Caledonian Railway.

Hill was born on 7 April 1813 in Edinburgh, Scotland.

In 1836, Hill was appointed as the Keeper of Sasines for Glasgow. He served in this position until the registers moved to Edinburgh to be centralised. He became a director of the Old Monkland & Kirkintilloch Railway, which was one of the first railways to be established in Scotland. He also became a director of the Glasgow, Airdrie & Monkland Junction Railway. In this role, during the 1840s he was involved in an unsuccessful proposal to move the University of Glasgow from its location in the High Street to Woodlands in northwest Glasgow. He was chairman of the Edinburgh & Bathgate Railway and in 1856 he became a director of the Caledonian Railway. During 1868–1880, Hill was Chairman of the Caledonian Railway. In 1871, he considered a proposed amalgamation with the North British Railways. Hill was also chairman of the Busby Railway and the Edinburgh Street Tramways. He was a director of the Ceylon Investment Association and the Scottish Amicable Life Assurance Society.

Thomas Hill died aged 75 on 26 April 1888 at Villa Jean in Cannes, southern France.
