= Leadhills and Wanlockhead Branch =

Railway in Scotland

The Leadhills and Wanlockhead Light Railway was a short branch railway built in Scotland to serve mining settlements, high in the Lowther Hills, connecting them to the Carlisle - Carstairs main line. The line was opened in 1901–02, and was the highest standard gauge railway line in the British Isles. Hoped-for developments did not emerge, and when the world lead price slumped in the 1920s, the line sustained heavy losses. It was closed on 2 January 1939.

== History ==
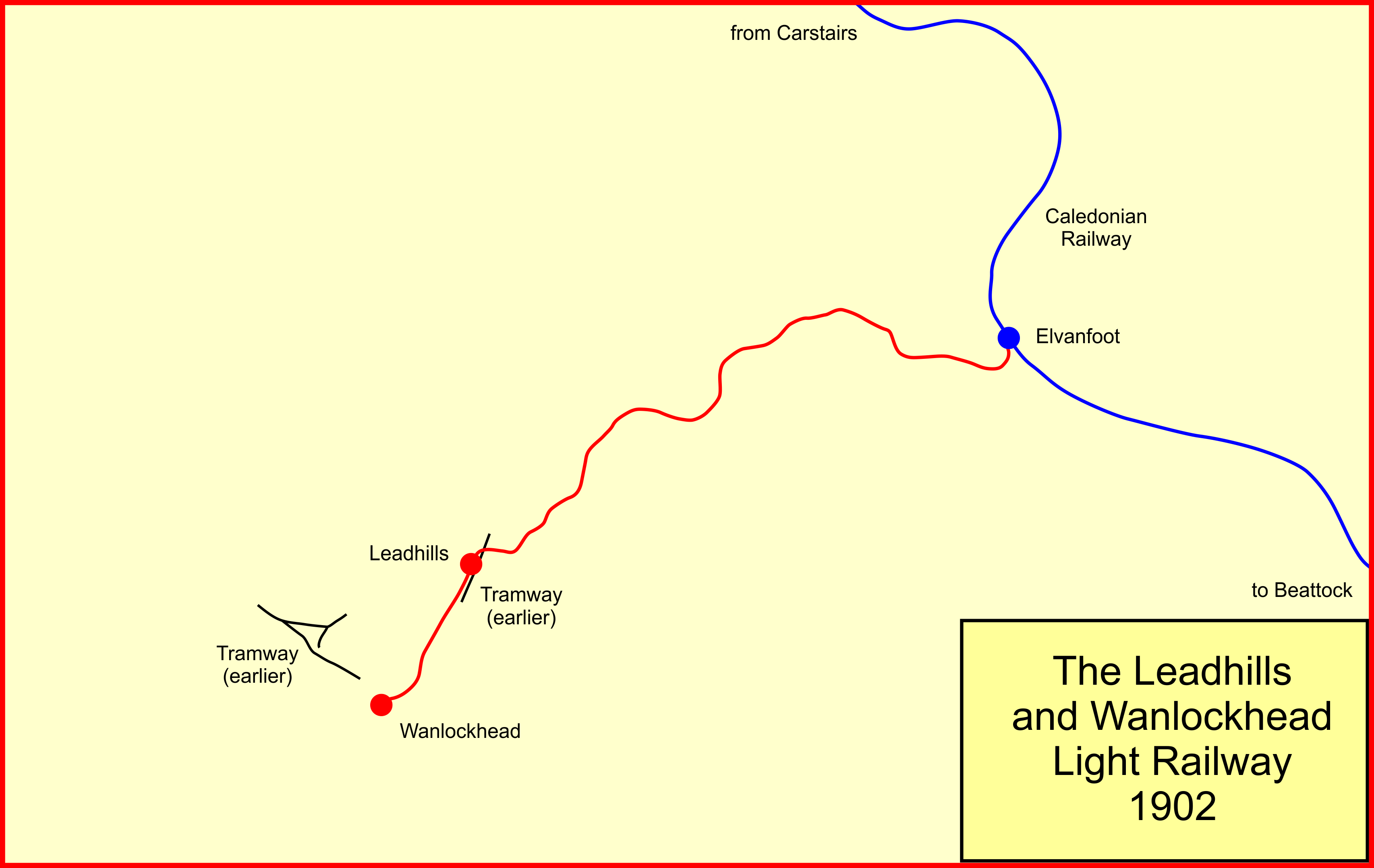
System map of the Leadhills and Wanlockhead Light Railway

The Light Railways Act 1896 was introduced to encourage the cheap construction of railways that were likely to be lightly used, by permitting some of the former requirements for new railway construction to be omitted.

Lead had been mined in the wild terrain at Leadhills since the eighteenth century; it was carted to Leith Harbour via Biggar over the poor roads of the period. 80% of Scotland's output came from the area. In 1845 a narrow gauge tramway was built between Meadowfoot, about 3 miles (4 km) west of Wanlockhead to bring the lead ore (Galena) up to Wanlockhead for smelting. Other mines and a washery at Leadhills were also connected.

Local promoters saw that a railway connection to the main line would encourage the mining activity, and possibly also stimulate the establishment of a health resort there.

The Leadhills and Wanlockhead Light Railway obtained its authorising light railway order, the Caledonian Railway (Leadhills and Wanlockhead) Light Railway Order 1898, on 5 August 1898, to make a branch from Elvanfoot, on the main line of the Caledonian Railway. The line opened as far as Leadhills on 1 October 1901 and was extended to Wanlockhead on 1 October 1902. (Note: Paterson says on page 289 that the extension to Wanlockhead opened to goods on 19 September 1902 and to passengers on 19 October 1920.) It was worked by the Caledonian Railway.

Lead mining traffic was carried, but was never as extensive as hoped, and the health-seeking visitor traffic was scant: the line dragged on with a very thinly patronised train service for less than 40 years. The Wanlockhead Mining Company went into liquidation in 1936, following a slump in world lead prices after World War I, and the viability of the line was finished.

The last passenger train ran on 31 December 1938, and the line closed goods traffic shortly afterwards.

== Route ==
When the line opened as far as Leadhills, that station was the highest in Scotland and the following year Wanlockhead took that accolade, at 1,498 feet (457 m) above sea level. The line was the highest standard gauge line in the British Isles, and also the highest adhesion-worked line. The altitude at Elvanfoot is 922 feet (281 m) and the length of the line was 7¼ miles (11.7 km); the average gradient was 1 in 42.

The only stations were Elvanfoot, the junction station on the main line, and Leadhills and Wanlockhead. The passenger stations did not have raised platforms, and the passenger carriages had three levels of step board which folded down to enable passengers to board. The Caledonian Railway worked the line, and no 172, an 0-4-4T was used in the early years. The trains were mixed (passenger and goods) and the maximum speed was 20 mph (32 km/h).

Rispin Cleugh viaduct shortly before being demolished, 11 November 1990

A significant structure on the line was Rispin Cleugh viaduct, built by Sir Robert McAlpine & Co. It was built from concrete and was clad with terracotta bricks to improve its appearance. It was demolished with explosives in 1991.

The tramway referred to was intersected by the railway when it was built, and there was a flat crossing a short distance north of Leadhills station, where the tramway led to a washery.

== Reuse ==
The narrow gauge Leadhills and Wanlockhead Railway, which is also a light railway, has been built on the track formation, west from Leadhills. Some terracotta bricks from the demolished viaduct were used to clad a signal box at Leadhills station.

== See also ==
- Scots Mining Company House

== Notes ==
=== Sources ===
- Atterbury, Paul (2004). Branch Line Britain. Newton Abbott, Devon: David & Charles. ISBN 0-7153-2416-0. OCLC 70230042.
- Awdry, Christopher (1990). Encyclopaedia of British Railway Companies. Sparkford: Patrick Stephens Ltd. ISBN 1-8526-0049-7. OCLC 19514063. CN 8983.
- Jowett, Alan (March 1989). Jowett's Railway Atlas of Great Britain and Ireland: From Pre-Grouping to the Present Day (1st ed.). Sparkford: Patrick Stephens Ltd. ISBN 978-1-85260-086-0. OCLC 22311137.
