= Brian Giffey =

British intelligence officer

Lt-Col Chester Kenneth Otto Brian Giffey (3 May 1887 – 28 December 1967) was a middle-ranking member of British intelligence who in 1941-42 was the Secret Intelligence Service’s section head in charge of the Soviet Union, Sweden and Finland. Unlike the better-known Cambridge Five who were traitors, Giffey deserves to be known as a loyal desk officer. SIS, however, has left him nameless in the service's official history. Elsewhere in intelligence literature he has been incorrectly called Frank Giffey. Giffey’s best known achievement comes from his postwar work on the Nazi Arrest and Denazification Sub-Committee in Berlin on which he represented Britain.

== Early life ==
Giffey was born in London as Otto Chester Kurt Brian Petersen while his mother was still married to a Mr Petersen. The boy was raised in Hamburg, Germany, where his father Georg Otho Giffey, a German, ran a successful insurance business. Giffey’s parents were able to marry only in 1897 when the boy was ten years old. He attended Altona Gymnasium in Hamburg as Otto Giffey. His school studies were conducted in German; this was also the language of the family at home. Giffey’s mother Helena, however, was Canadian and continued to speak English with the boy. After Giffey senior’s death the mother and son moved to England.

== Worcestershire Regiment ==
With help from an unscrupulous lawyer, Giffey was able to sort out his impressive range of names, and matriculate at Merton College, Oxford in 1907. On completion of his degree course, he joined the Worcestershire Regiment as 2nd Lieutenant. In the First World War he was badly injured at Loos in 1915, and after convalescence was assigned to light duties in England and India. He rejoined his regiment in Mesopotamia in 1917. From 1918 to 1920 he was part of the British Military Mission in Russia; from 1926 to 1928 he served with his regiment in Germany.

== Secret Intelligence Service ==
Giffey joined SIS (MI6) in 1928. His first appointment was to Tallinn, Estonia, as passport control officer, who ostensibly issued passports and visas while actually also watching the Soviets and establishing links with Russian émigrés. His relationship with his regiment continued while seconded to the Foreign Office and in 1931 he was promoted to a major. The writer Graham Greene saw the night-life of Tallinn in Maj Giffey's company and described him as "the standing joke here, as the hearty fellow, hard drinker, man-about-Tallinn." Giffey must have impressed Greene, if not necessarily in a positive way, since he included him as Capt Gullie in his next novel, England Made Me. In 1940 Giffey, being a foreigner, was forced to leave Estonia as the Soviets overran the country. Little is known about Giffey’s work in Tallinn but he was promoted to section chief on arrival in London in 1941. As specialist in all things Russian, he was given the charge of the Soviet Union and some Scandinavian countries. At the end of 1942 he was appointed to Baghdad as station head. This is where he stayed until 1944 when he was unexpectedly dismissed from the secret service.

== Control Commission for Germany ==
In 1944 Giffey was reinstated in the Worcestershire Regiment and promoted to a lieutenant colonel. He was sent to Germany where he worked as SO1 in Public Safety Branch and for over a year drafted legislation to help rebuild and denazify Germany. He was a rotating chairman of the Nazi Arrest and Denazification Sub-Committee. In 1948 he became PSO1 in the Special Police Corps, working as liaison officer in Bünde. The following year he was made redundant and returned to London.

== Final years ==
In his retirement Giffey worked for the Association of Ukrainians in Great Britain from 1949 to 1958, liaising between the Home Office and the postwar Ukrainian refugees. A good linguist, he also taught languages in an evening school. He died in London in 1967. His widow Anni, Estonian and 25 years his junior, died in 2000, having destroyed many of her husband's papers. The couple had no children.
