= Benjamin Connor =

- Born: 1813; Glasgow
- Died: 3 February 1876 (aged 62–63); Glasgow
- Children: 5, including Benjamin Conner Jr
- Engineering career
- Discipline: Mechanical engineering

Benjamin Connor or Benjamin Conner (1813 in Glasgow – 3 February 1876 in Glasgow) was a Locomotive Superintendent of the Caledonian Railway from 1856 to 1876. Connor married Helen Dick and had five children: James (born 1854), Cristina (born 1858), Alexander (born 1860), Benjamin (born 1864) and William (born 1867).

== Design ==
The Railway Gazette described Connor as a "very celebrated engineer" because of his 1839 design of the passenger locomotive which was an enlargement on the locomotives available at the time. A locomotive built from his drawings was exhibited at the 1862 London International Exhibition.

== Career ==
Connor was apprenticed to James Gray of Glasgow. Later he worked for Murdoch, Aitken & Co, Glasgow, where he learned locomotive engineering. He moved to England, working in Liverpool and Manchester, and then returned to Scotland to work for W.M. Neilson. After this he worked for Robert Napier and Sons and learned marine engineering. He was appointed locomotive superintendent of the Caledonian Railway in 1856.

== Sources ==
- Ian Allan ABC of British Railways Locomotives, January 1961, page 58

Business positions
Preceded by Robert Sinclair	Locomotive Superintendent of the Caledonian Railway; 1856-1876	Succeeded by George Brittain
