= Giffen =

Giffen is a surname. Notable people with the surname include:

- Brad Giffen, Canadian television reporter, anchor and radio personality
- George Giffen (1859–1927), Australian cricketer
- James Giffen, American businessman
- Keith Giffen (born 1952), American comic book illustrator and writer
- Robert C. Giffen (1886–1962), United States Navy admiral
- Robert Giffen (1837–1910), British statistician and economist
- Walter Giffen (1861–1949), Australian cricketer

== See also ==
- Giffen good, in economics and consumer theory
- Barony and Castle of Giffen
- Giffen railway station, in Scotland
