= Caledonian Railway =

British pre-grouping railway company

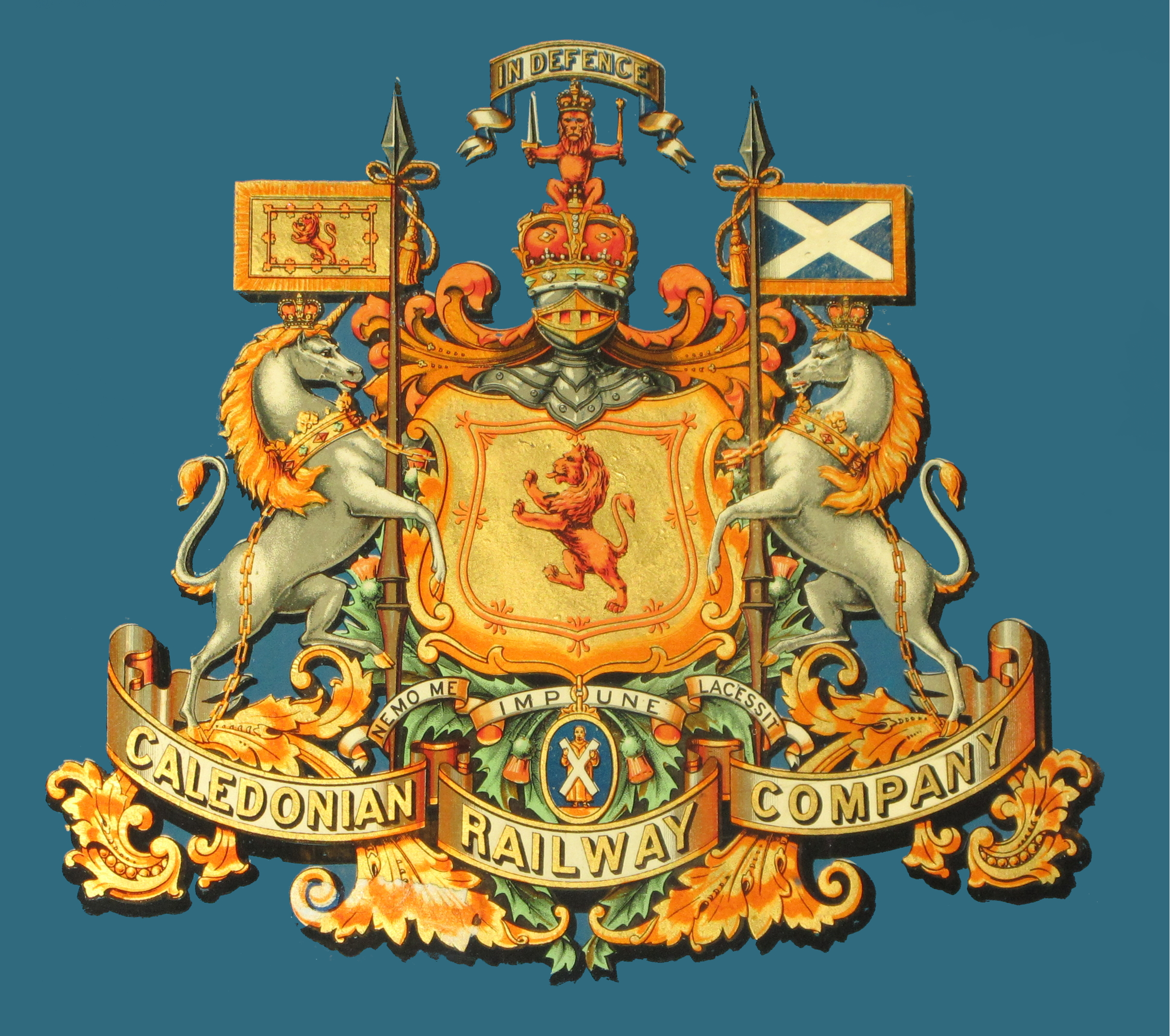

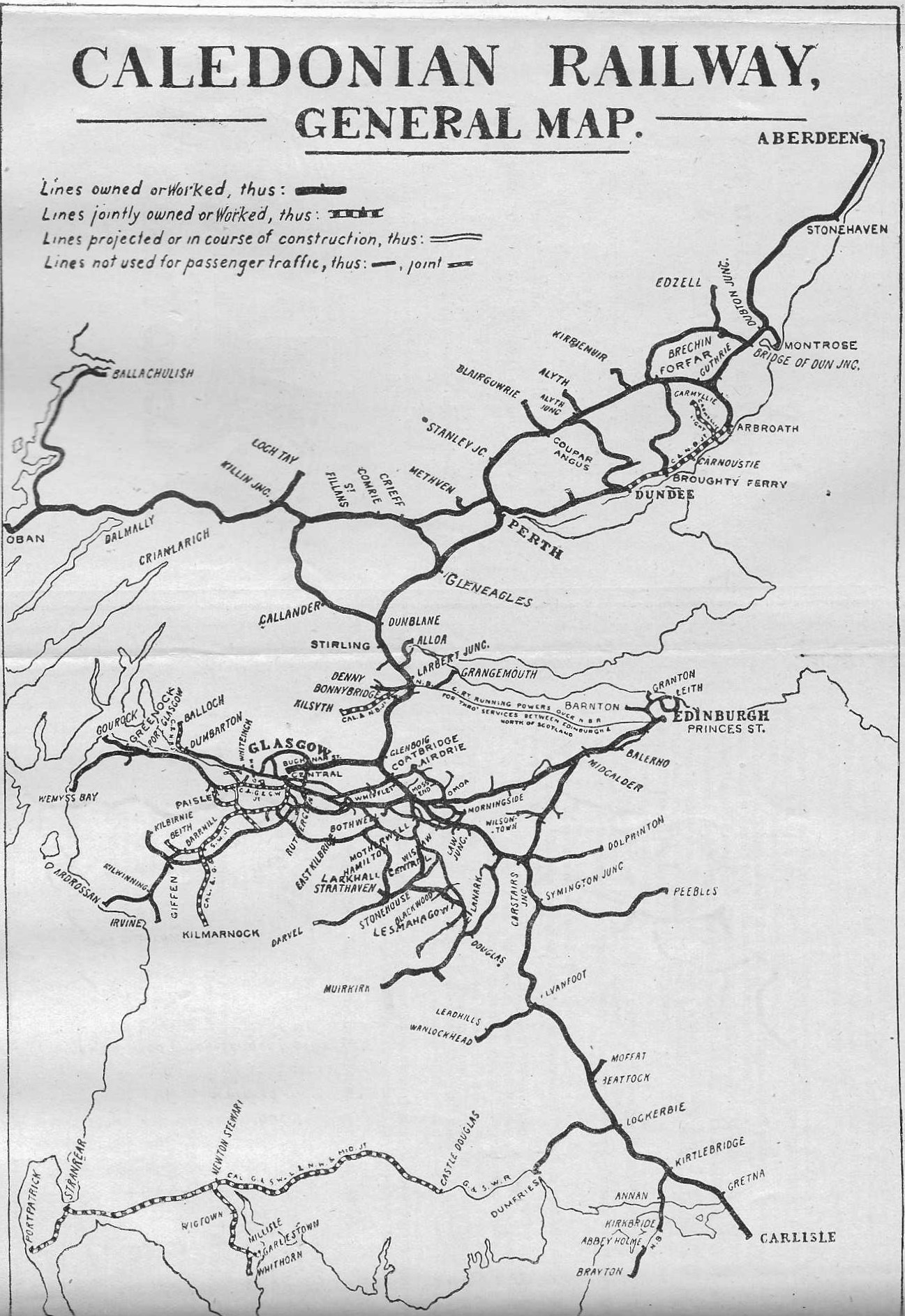
- 1920 map of the railway

Overview
- Headquarters: Glasgow
- Dates of operation: 1847; 179 years ago – 1923; 103 years ago
- Successor: London, Midland and Scottish Railway

Technical
- Track gauge: 4 ft 8 1/2 in (1,435 mm) standard gauge
- Length: 1,118 miles 13 chains (1,799.5 km) (1919)
- Track length: 2,836 miles 66 chains (4,565.4 km) (1919)

The Caledonian Railway (CR) was one of the two biggest of the five major Scottish railway companies prior to the 1923 Grouping. It was formed in 1845 with the objective of forming a link between English railways and Glasgow. It progressively extended its network and reached Edinburgh and Aberdeen, with a dense network of branch lines in the area surrounding Glasgow. It was absorbed into the London, Midland and Scottish Railway in 1923. Many of its principal routes are still used, and the original main line between Carlisle and Glasgow is in use as part of the West Coast Main Line railway (with a modified entry into Glasgow itself).

== Introduction ==
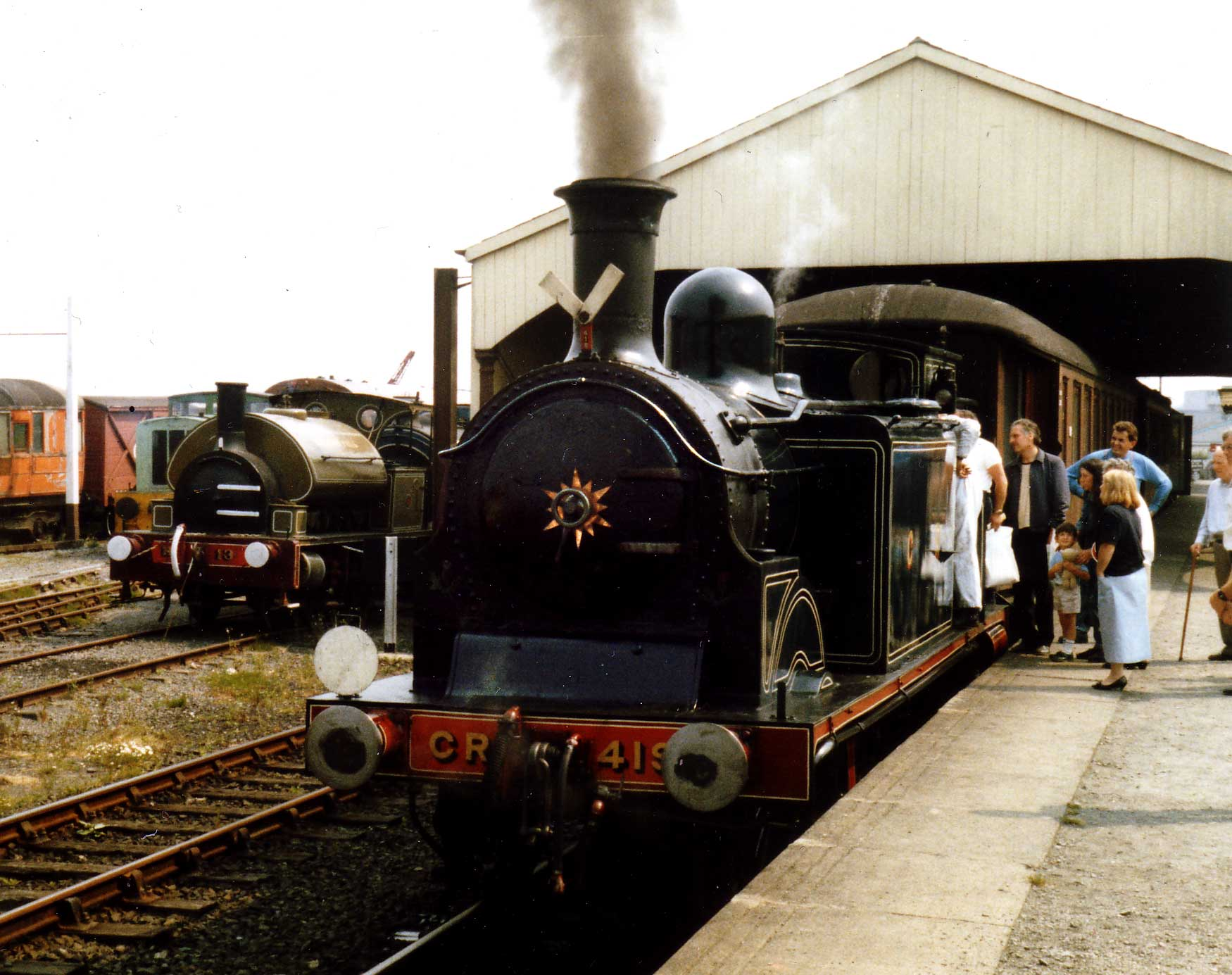
Caledonian locomotive no. 419 at the Bo'ness and Kinneil Railway (formerly part of the North British Railway).

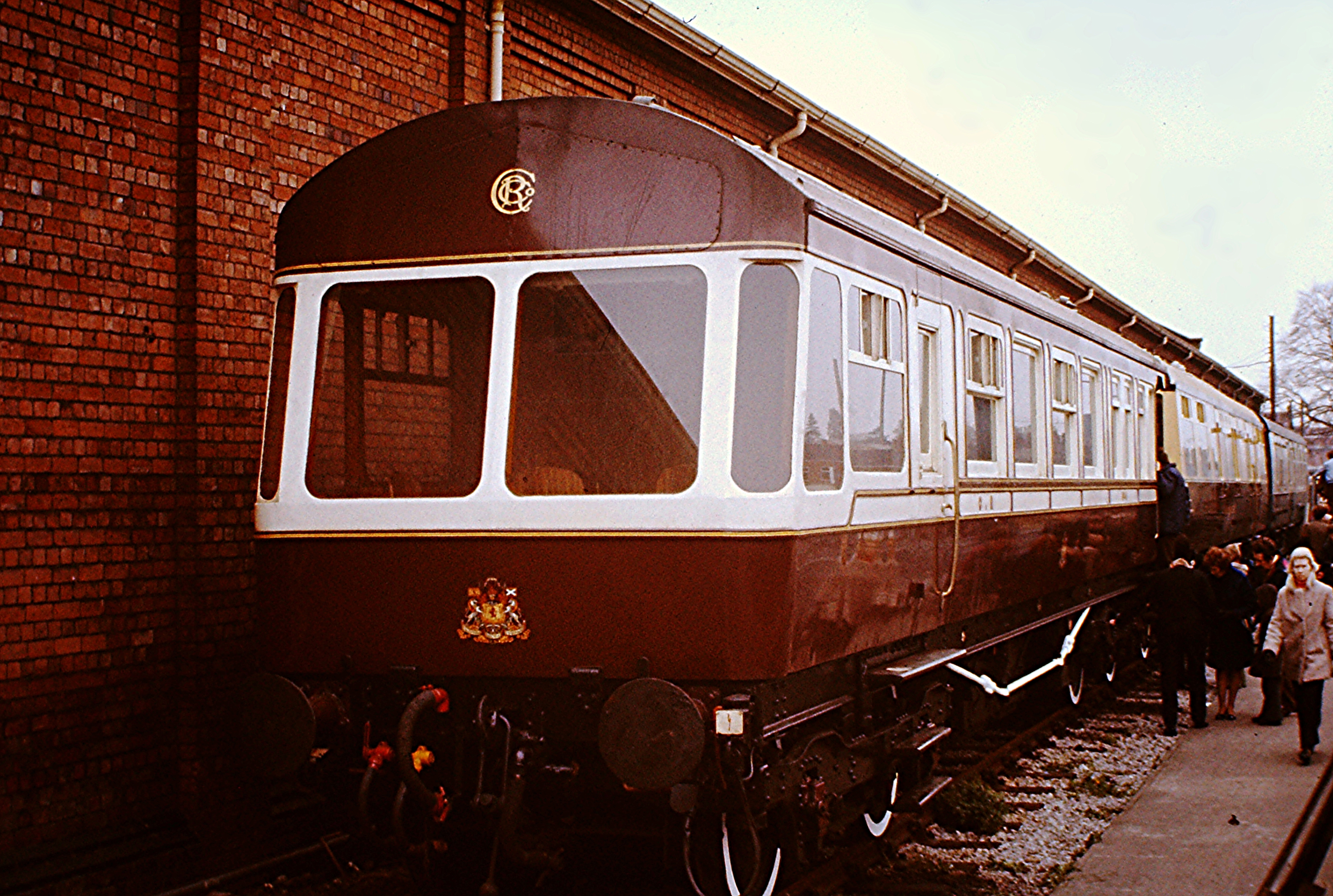
Caledonian Engineers Saloon No. 41

In the mid-1830s, railways in England evolved from local concerns to longer routes that connected cities, and then became networks. In Scotland it was clear that this was the way forward, and there was a desire to connect the Central Belt to the incipient English network. There was controversy over the route that such a line might take, but the Caledonian Railway was formed on 31 July 1845 and it opened its main line between Glasgow, Edinburgh and Carlisle in 1848, making an alliance with the English London and North Western Railway which connected Carlisle to the English Midlands and London. In the obituary of the engineer Richard Price-Williams written in 1916 the contractor of the Caledonian Railway is stated to be Thomas Brassey and the civil engineer George Heald.

Although the company was supported by Scottish investors, more than half of its shares were held in England.

Establishing itself as an intercity and cross-border railway, the Caledonian set about securing territory by leasing other authorised or newly built lines, and fierce competition developed with other, larger Scottish railways, particularly the North British Railway and the Glasgow and South Western Railway. The company established primacy in some areas, but remained less than successful in others; considerable sums were expended in the process, not always finding the approval of shareholders.

A considerable steamer passenger traffic developed on the Firth of Clyde serving island resorts, and fast boat trains were run from Glasgow to steamer piers; the company was refused permission to operate its own steamers, and it formed a partnership with a nominally independent, but friendly, operator, the Caledonian Steam Packet Company.

In 1923 the railways of Great Britain were "grouped" under the Railways Act 1921 and the Caledonian Railway was a constituent of the newly formed London Midland and Scottish Railway; its capitalisation at that time was £57 million (equivalent to £2.98 billion today), and it had a single-track mileage of 2,827 miles (4,550 km).

It extended from Aberdeen to Portpatrick, and from Oban to Carlisle, running express passenger services and a heavy mineral traffic.

== Early history ==
=== The Lanarkshire coal lines ===
In the closing years of the 18th century, the pressing need to bring coal cheaply to Glasgow from the plentiful Monklands coalfield had been met by the construction of the Monkland Canal, opened throughout in 1794. This encouraged development of the coalfield, but dissatisfaction at the monopoly prices said to be exacted by the canal led to the construction of the Monkland and Kirkintilloch Railway (M&KR), Scotland's first public railway; it opened in 1826. Development of the use of blackband ironstone by David Mushet, and the invention of the hot blast process of iron smelting by James Beaumont Neilson in 1828, led to a huge and rapid increase in iron production and demand for iron ore and coal in the Coatbridge area.

The industrial development led to the construction of other railways contiguous with the M&KR, in particular the Garnkirk and Glasgow Railway and the Wishaw and Coltness Railway. These two lines worked in harmony, merging to form the Glasgow, Garnkirk and Coatbridge Railway in 1841, and competing with the M&KR and its allies. All these lines used the local track gauge of 4 ft 6 in (1,372 mm), and they were referred to as "the coal lines"; passenger traffic was not a dominant activity.

=== English railways ===
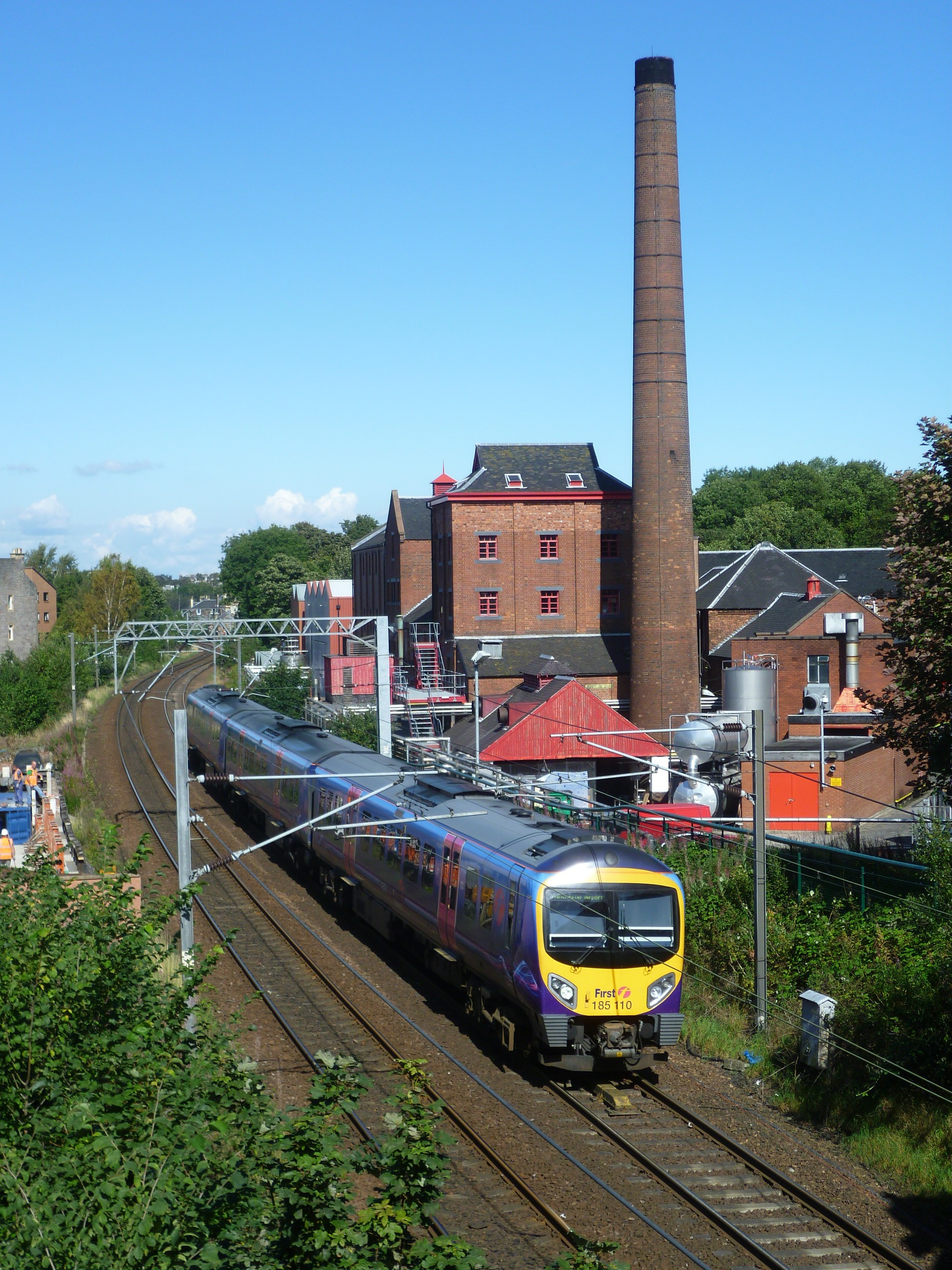
Former Caledonian Main Line, Edinburgh 2011

During this period, the first long-distance railways were opened in England; the Liverpool and Manchester Railway, the first intercity line, opened in 1830 and was an immediate success. It was quickly followed by the Grand Junction Railway in 1837, the London and Birmingham Railway in 1838 and the North Union Railway reaching Preston in 1838, so that London was linked with the Lancashire and West Midlands centres of industry.

=== Connecting Scotland and London ===
It was clearly desirable to connect central Scotland into the emerging network. At first it was assumed that only one route from Scotland to England would be feasible, and there was considerable controversy over the possible route. A major difficulty was the terrain of the Southern Uplands: a route running through the hilly lands would involve steep and lengthy gradients that were challenging for the engine power of the time; a route around them, either to the west or the east, involved much lengthier main lines, and made connection to both Edinburgh and Glasgow more problematic.

Caledonian Railway Act 1845
- Act of Parliament
- Parliament of the United Kingdom
- Long title: An Act for making a Railway from Carlisle to Edinburgh and Glasgow and the North of Scotland, to be called "The Caledonian Railway."
- Citation: 8 & 9 Vict. c. clxii

Dates
- Royal assent: 31 July 1845

Text of statute as originally enacted

Many competing schemes were put forward, not all of them well thought out, and two successive government commissions examined them. However, they did not have mandatory force, and after considerable rivalry, the Caledonian Railway obtained an authorising act of Parliament, the Caledonian Railway Act 1845 (8 & 9 Vict. c. clxii), on 31 July 1845, for lines from Glasgow and Edinburgh to Carlisle. The share capital was to be £1.8 million (equivalent to £189 million today).

The Glasgow and Edinburgh lines combined at Carstairs in Clydesdale, and the route then crossed over Beattock Summit and continued on through Annandale. The promoters had engaged in a frenzy of provisional acquisitions of other lines being put forward or already being constructed, as they considered it was vital to secure territory to their own control and to exclude competing concerns as far as possible. It was not the only Anglo-Scottish route; the North British Railway opened its coastal route between Edinburgh and Berwick-upon-Tweed on 22 June 1846, forming part of what has become the East Coast Main Line. The Glasgow, Paisley, Kilmarnock and Ayr Railway had opened in 1841 with the declared intention of reaching Carlisle by way of Dumfries; it did so in 1850, changing its name then to the Glasgow and South Western Railway.

=== The main line ===
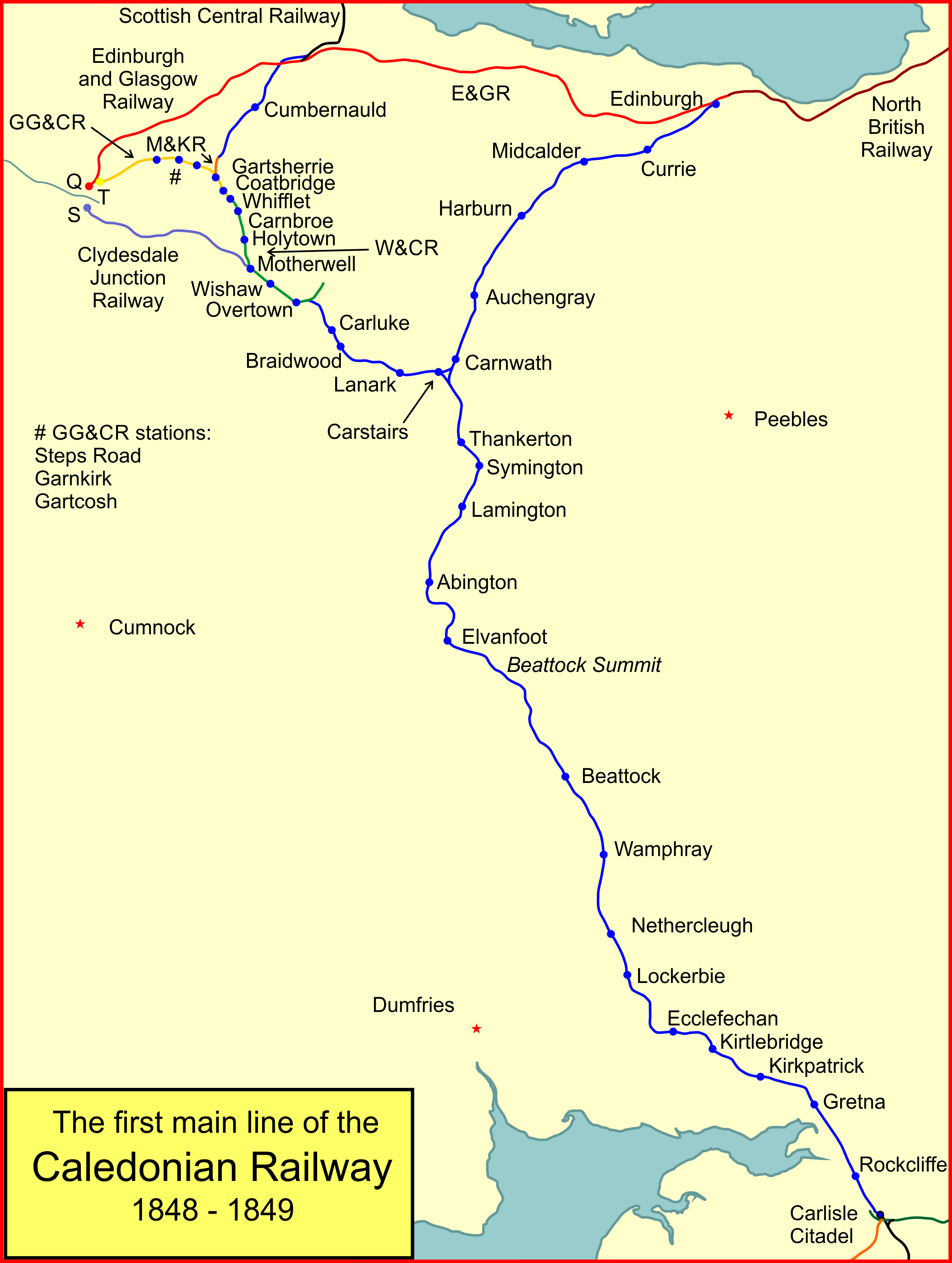
The Caledonian Railway first main line

The main line was opened from Carlisle to Beattock on 10 September 1847, and throughout between Glasgow and Carlisle on 15 February 1848. A continuous railway route between Glasgow and London existed for the first time. (It had been possible to travel via Edinburgh and Newcastle upon Tyne since 1846, but this involved crossing the River Tweed at Berwick by road, and the River Tyne at Gateshead / Newcastle by congested road bridge or ferry.)

The Caledonian Railway's Edinburgh line from Carstairs opened on 1 April 1848. The terminal at Edinburgh was at Lothian Road. Glasgow was reached over the Glasgow, Garnkirk and Coatbridge Railway (successor to the Garnkirk and Glasgow Railway), and the Wishaw and Coltness Railway, which the Caledonian had leased from 1 January 1847 and 1 January 1846 respectively. The Glasgow station was the Townhead terminus of the Glasgow, Garnkirk and Coatbridge Railway.

During the process of seeking parliamentary authorisation, the Caledonian observed that the Clydesdale Junction Railway was being promoted. The Caledonian acquired that line during its construction, and it opened in 1849. It gave an alternative and shorter access to another Glasgow passenger terminal, named South Side, and to the Clyde quays at General Terminus (over the connected General Terminus and Glasgow Harbour Railway). The South Side station was already being used by the Glasgow, Barrhead and Neilston Direct Railway, worked by the Caledonian. One day, they hoped, they might extend that line into Ayrshire. Meanwhile, the line was leased (for 999 years) to the Caledonian in 1849.

The Caledonian recognised that the Townhead terminus was unsatisfactory and constructed a deviation from Milton Junction to a new Glasgow terminus at Buchanan Street. It opened on 1 November 1849. Trains to Edinburgh, Stirling and Carlisle used the new station; the Stirling trains had to reverse at Gartsherrie Junction. The Garnkirk's old Glebe Street (Townhead) station was reduced to goods and mineral duties. In 1853–54 the Hayhill Fork, between Gartcosh and Garnqueen, was opened, enabling direct running from Buchanan Street towards Stirling.

=== Financial problems, and Greenock amalgamation ===
In the period between formation of the Caledonian Railway and the opening of the main line, a large number of leases and working arrangements had been concluded with other railways being promoted or built nearby. This was mostly done by guaranteeing those shareholders an income on their capital, which meant no immediate cash was required. When the lines started working, suddenly a huge periodical payment was required, and the income was inadequate to satisfy it. There were also suggestions of improper share acquisitions, and in the period 1848 to 1850 a number of shareholder inquiries disclosed bad practices, and many board members had to resign in February 1850.

Caledonian Railway Arrangements Act 1851
- Act of Parliament
- Parliament of the United Kingdom
- Long title: An Act to sanction certain Arrangements entered into between the Caledonian Railway Company and the Holders of guaranteed and preferential Interests in the Company, and to enable the Company to raise a further Sum of Money.
- Citation: 14 & 15 Vict. c. cxxxiv

Dates
- Royal assent: 7 August 1851

The company had obtained the Caledonian and Glasgow, Paisley and Greenock Railways Amalgamation Act 1847 (10 & 11 Vict. c. clxix) giving it powers to merge with the Glasgow, Paisley and Greenock Railway (GP&GR) in 1847, but even more alarming revelations of financial impropriety emerged regarding that company, and the Caledonian considered getting authorisation to cancel the amalgamation. However, it was later decided to proceed, and the amalgamation took place by the Caledonian Railway Arrangements Act 1851 (14 & 15 Vict. c. cxxxiv) of 7 August 1851. The GP&GR operated the line between Glasgow and Paisley jointly with the Glasgow and South Western Railway (G&SWR), and the Paisley line used a terminus at Bridge Street in Glasgow.

The Caledonian now worked trains at three termini in Glasgow: Buchanan Street, South Side (from the Clydesdale Junction line, mostly used for local trains to Motherwell and Hamilton), and Bridge Street (on the Paisley line).

Gradually the financial difficulties were got under control, by economy, and by the discovery that several of the lease agreements were illegal. Handsome dividends continued to be paid, but it was not until March 1853 that the dividend was paid wholly from revenue. (Note: The earlier practice of paying dividends from capital made some shareholders feel good, but gave a misleading indication that the company was profitable.)

=== South Lanarkshire: mainly mineral traffic ===
If the Caledonian Railway had been formed as an intercity trunk line, its attention was early on turned to other demands. Local interests in Lanark promoted a branch line to their town, opening in 1855. Coal owners in South Lanarkshire pressed for a railway connection, and the Lesmahagow Railway was formed by them, opening in 1856. It was later absorbed by the Caledonian, but other lines followed in the sparsely populated but mineral-rich area. As new coal mines opened, so new branches were needed, connecting Coalburn, Stonehouse, Strathaven, Muirkirk and Darvel and many other places, with new lines built right up until 1905. When the coal became exhausted in the second half of the 20th century, the railways were progressively closed; passenger traffic had always been light and it too disappeared. Only the passenger traffic to the Lanark and Larkhall branches remain in operation.

=== North Lanarkshire ===
In North Lanarkshire, the North British Railway was a keen competitor, having taken over the Monkland Railways. The area contained the rapidly-growing iron production area surrounding Coatbridge, and servicing that industry with coal and iron ore, and transport to local and more distant metal processing locations, dominated the Caledonian's activity in the region. The Rutherglen and Coatbridge line, later linking Airdrie, and the Carfin to Midcalder line were routes with significant passenger traffic. Many lines to coal and iron ore pits further east were built, but serving remote areas the lines closed when the mineral extraction ceased.

== Developing the network: to 1880 ==
=== Busby and East Kilbride ===
With the Barrhead line in full operation, interests in Busby wanted a railway connection. The wealthy middle class saw the town as an elegant location and the Busby Railway opened in 1866. Commuting was already in fashion. The line was extended to East Kilbride in 1868, although at that time the then small village did not generate much business for the railway.

=== Branches south of Carstairs ===
When the main line was built, no branches were provided in the thinly populated terrain of the Southern Uplands. Four independent companies made branches themselves, and the Caledonian built two.

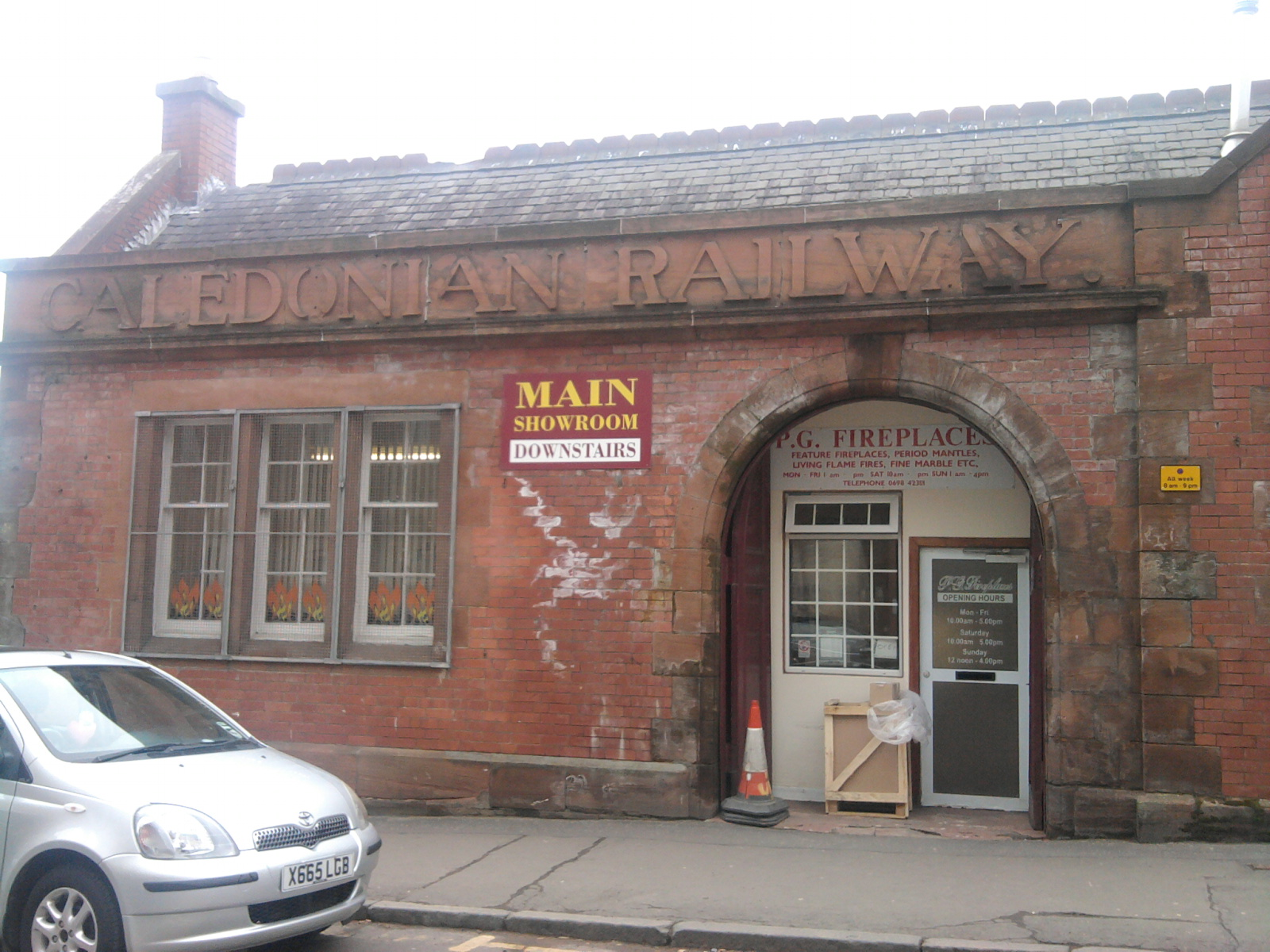
A former Caledonian Railway building in Hamilton.

The Symington, Biggar and Broughton Railway was opened in 1860, having been taken over by the Caledonian during construction. It was extended to Peebles in 1864.

In 1863 an independent line, the Dumfries, Lochmaben and Lockerbie Railway was opened. The line was encouraged by the Caledonian Railway, giving westward access into Dumfriesshire, and worked by it; the Caledonian acquired the line in 1865. The Portpatrick Railway had opened between Castle Douglas and Portpatrick in 1861–62 and the Caledonian Railway worked that railway; it obtained running powers over the G&SWR between Dumfries and Castle Douglas, and at a stroke the Caledonian had penetrated deep into the south-west, and to the ferry service to the north of Ireland, territory that the G&SWR had assumed was its own. The Portpatrick Railway later reformed with the Wigtownshire Railway as the Portpatrick and Wigtownshire Joint Railway; the Caledonian was a one-quarter owner.

Caledonian Railway (Carstairs and Dolphinton Branch) Act 1863
- Act of Parliament
- Parliament of the United Kingdom
- Long title: An Act to enable the Caledonian Railway Company to make a Branch Railway from Carstairs to join the Leadburn, Linton, and Dolphinton Railway; and for other Purposes.
- Citation: 26 & 27 Vict. c. xxiv

Dates
- Royal assent: 11 May 1863

The North British Railway (NBR) opened its branch line to Dolphinton, east of Carstairs, and the Caledonian feared that the next step would be an incursion by the NBR into Caledonian territory, possibly seeking running powers on the main line. To head this off, the Caledonian built its own Dolphinton branch from Carstairs; authorised by the Caledonian Railway (Carstairs and Dolphinton Branch) Act 1863 (26 & 27 Vict. c. xxiv), it opened in 1867. Dolphinton had a population of 260 and two railways, and traffic was correspondingly meagre, and the line closed in 1945 to passengers and in 1950 to goods.

The independent Solway Junction Railway was opened in 1869, linking iron mines in Cumberland with the Caledonian Railway at Kirtlebridge, crossing the Solway Firth by a 1,940 yd (1,770 m) viaduct; the company worked the line itself. It considerably shortened the route to the Lanarkshire ironworks, and was heavily used at first, but the traffic was depleted by cheap imported iron ore within a decade. The Scottish part of the line was acquired by the Caledonian Railway in 1873, and the whole line in 1895. Serious ice damage and later heavy maintenance costs made the line seriously unprofitable and it was closed in 1921.

== Glasgow Central station ==
When the Caledonian's first main line opened, it used the Townhead terminus of the Glasgow, Garnkirk and Coatbridge Railway, and almost simultaneously, it acquired access to the South Side station planned for the Clydesdale Junction Railway. It extended from Townhead to Buchanan Street, an "inadequate and very cramped station" in 1849, but the route from there to the southwards main line was very circuitous. The Caledonian also worked the Glasgow, Paisley and Greenock Railway with a terminus at Bridge Street, also inconveniently situated south of the Clyde: the Caledonian, therefore, had three unsatisfactory Glasgow termini.

As early as 1846 proposals to cross the Clyde from Gushetfaulds to a Dunlop Street terminal had been put forward; the idea was killed by fierce opposition from the Clyde Bridges Trust (which would lose toll income) and the Admiralty (who insisted on a swing bridge).

Caledonian Railway (Gordon Street Station Connecting Lines) Act 1875
- Act of Parliament
- Parliament of the United Kingdom
- Long title: An Act for enabling the Caledonian Railway Company to alter the authorised lines of Railway and Viaduct across the River Clyde for connecting their Railways on the south side of Glasgow with their authorised Station in Gordon Street in that city; and for other purposes.
- Citation: 38 & 39 Vict. c. cxxxiii

Dates
- Royal assent: 19 July 1875

Text of statute as originally enacted

Another scheme failed to get finance in 1866 and again in 1873, but the Caledonian Railway (Gordon Street Station Connecting Lines) Act 1875 (38 & 39 Vict. c. cxxxiii) was obtained to build a bridge crossing the Clyde and bringing the South Side route into the city centre. A four-track railway bridge crossing the river was designed by Blyth and Cunningham and built by Sir William Arrol & Co.; the Clyde railway bridge was complete on 1 October 1878. The new Glasgow Central station on Gordon Street opened in December 1879. It had eight platforms, but was considered to be unsatisfactory, having narrow platforms; the circulating area was "ridiculously small"; there was no good cab stance and inadequate siding accommodation.

The Bridge Street terminus was jointly operated with the Glasgow and South Western Railway (G&SWR); it had to be reconstructed as a through station, and the Greenock line trains (operated by the Caledonian) continued to use it.

A ninth platform was added to Central station in 1889, but a major expansion took place in the years 1901–1906, when the platforms were lengthened and four platforms added on the west side; a second river crossing was provided. In 1904 Bridge Street station was substantially changed to provide carriage washing and stabling facilities; it closed as a passenger station on 1 March 1905. Central station was operated by a single signal box, staffed with ten men. It was commissioned on 3 May 1908; it had 374 miniature levers, the largest of its type in the world, operating points and signals by electro-pneumatic and electro-magnetic equipment.

== Extending the network after 1880 ==
=== Moffat Railway ===
Caledonian Railway Act 1889
- Act of Parliament
- Parliament of the United Kingdom
- Long title: An Act for enabling the Caledonian Railway Company to make and maintain certain Railways and other works, and take lands in the Counties of Stirling, Midlothian, Lanark and Ayr; to acquire the Undertakings of the Glasgow Central and Moffat Railway Companies, and to raise additional money; for extending the time for completing certain Railways and other works in the Counties of Lanark, Renfrew, and Forfar; for confirming certain agreements and authorising other agreements; for releasing the sums deposited with reference to the Port Carlisle Branch of the Solway Junction Railway Company, and to the Undertakings of the Annan Waterfoot Dock and Railway Company, and the Glasgow Central Railway Company; for dissolving the two Companies last named and the Moffat Railway Company; and for other purposes.
- Citation: 52 & 53 Vict. c. xii

Dates
- Royal assent: 31 May 1889

Text of statute as originally enacted

The Moffat Railway was opened from Beattock on 2 April 1883. It was just over 1 1/2 miles (2.4 km) long. It was worked by the Caledonian and absorbed on 11 November 1889 under the Caledonian Railway Act 1889 (52 & 53 Vict. c. xii). The Caledonian Railway sought to develop both Moffat and Peebles as watering places, and ran The Tinto Express from both places, combining at Symington, to Edinburgh and Glasgow for several years.

With the intention of revitalising the lead mining industry, the Leadhills and Wanlockhead Branch was opened as a light railway from Elvanfoot in 1901–02. With challenging gradients to reach Scotland's highest village in otherwise remote territory, the line scraped a bare living and closed in 1938.

=== From Greenock to the Firth of Clyde ===
In the mid-1850s the steamer connections on the Firth of Clyde assumed ever increasing importance, and journey transit times from settlements in Argyll and the islands to Glasgow became critical. The inconvenient situation of the Greenock station and pier encouraged thoughts of more convenient routes, and in 1862 the Greenock and Wemyss Bay Railway was authorised. It was an independent company intending to provide a fast connection from Rothesay on the Isle of Bute; it opened on 13 May 1865 and in August 1893 it amalgamated with the Caledonian Railway, having been operated by the Caledonian Railway since its opening.

In 1889 the Caledonian itself opened an extension line from Greenock to Gourock, more conveniently situated than Greenock; this involved the expensive construction of Newton Street Tunnel, the longest in Scotland.

In competing with rival rail and steamer connections, the Caledonian became frustrated with its reliance on independent steamer operators, and tried to obtain powers to operate the vessels directly; this was refused by Parliament on competition grounds, and in reaction the company founded the nominally independent Caledonian Steam Packet Company (CSPC) in 1889. The CSPC expanded its routes and services considerably; following nationalisation of the railways in 1948 it became owned by British Railways, but was divested in 1968 and later became a constituent of Caledonian MacBrayne (CalMac), which remains in state ownership.

=== Glasgow and Paisley suburban lines ===
In the final decades of the 19th century, as the cities spread into conurbations, the company's attention turned to increasing traffic in areas now thought of as "suburban". Street running tramways were already responding to the demand for passenger travel in these areas, but as yet they used horse traction.

The Cathcart District Railway was promoted as an independent concern but heavily supported by the Caledonian. It opened in 1886 from Pollokshields to Mount Florida and Cathcart (the eastern arm of the present-day Cathcart Circle Line) in 1886, and was extended via Shawlands to form a loop in 1894. It was worked by the Caledonian, although the company retained its independence until 1923.

The Glasgow Central Railway was authorised as an independent company to build a surface line from Rutherglen to Maryhill. It encountered fierce opposition, and the scheme was taken over by the Caledonian and converted into a route mainly in tunnel under Argyle Street. It opened in 1896, further encouraging suburban passenger travel. It closed in 1959 but reopened (as the Argyle Line) in 1979.

The Paisley and Barrhead District Railway was incorporated in 1897 and transferred to the Caledonian in 1902; it was to link Paisley and Barrhead and enable a circular service from Glasgow. The line was substantially ready in 1902 but by now street tramways were electrically operated and eminently successful. It was plain that a passenger service would not be viable against tram competition and the intended passenger service was never started.

=== North Clydeside ===
The area of the north bank of the river Clyde became increasingly important for industry, and therefore became heavily populated. The North British Railway and its satellites had gained an early monopoly of this traffic, but its importance encouraged the Caledonian to enter the area.

The Lanarkshire and Dumbartonshire Railway was nominally independent, running from near Maryhill to Dumbarton, opening progressively between 1894 and 1896. In 1896 the Caledonian gained access to Loch Lomond with the opening of the Dumbarton and Balloch Joint Railway (originally built by the Caledonian and Dumbartonshire Junction Railway), built jointly with the NBR.

=== The Lanarkshire and Ayrshire Railway ===
In 1888 the Lanarkshire and Ayrshire Railway opened a 6 1/2-mile (10.5 km) line from Giffen on the Glasgow, Barrhead and Kilmarnock Joint Railway to Ardrossan. Its purpose was to shorten the route for Caledonian mineral traffic, and it was worked by the Caledonian. In 1903–04 it was extended eastwards to Cathcart and Newton, enabling the heavy mineral trains to avoid the joint line and the congested area around Gushetfaulds from the Lanarkshire coalfields to Ardrossan Harbour.

== Edinburgh and Lothians ==
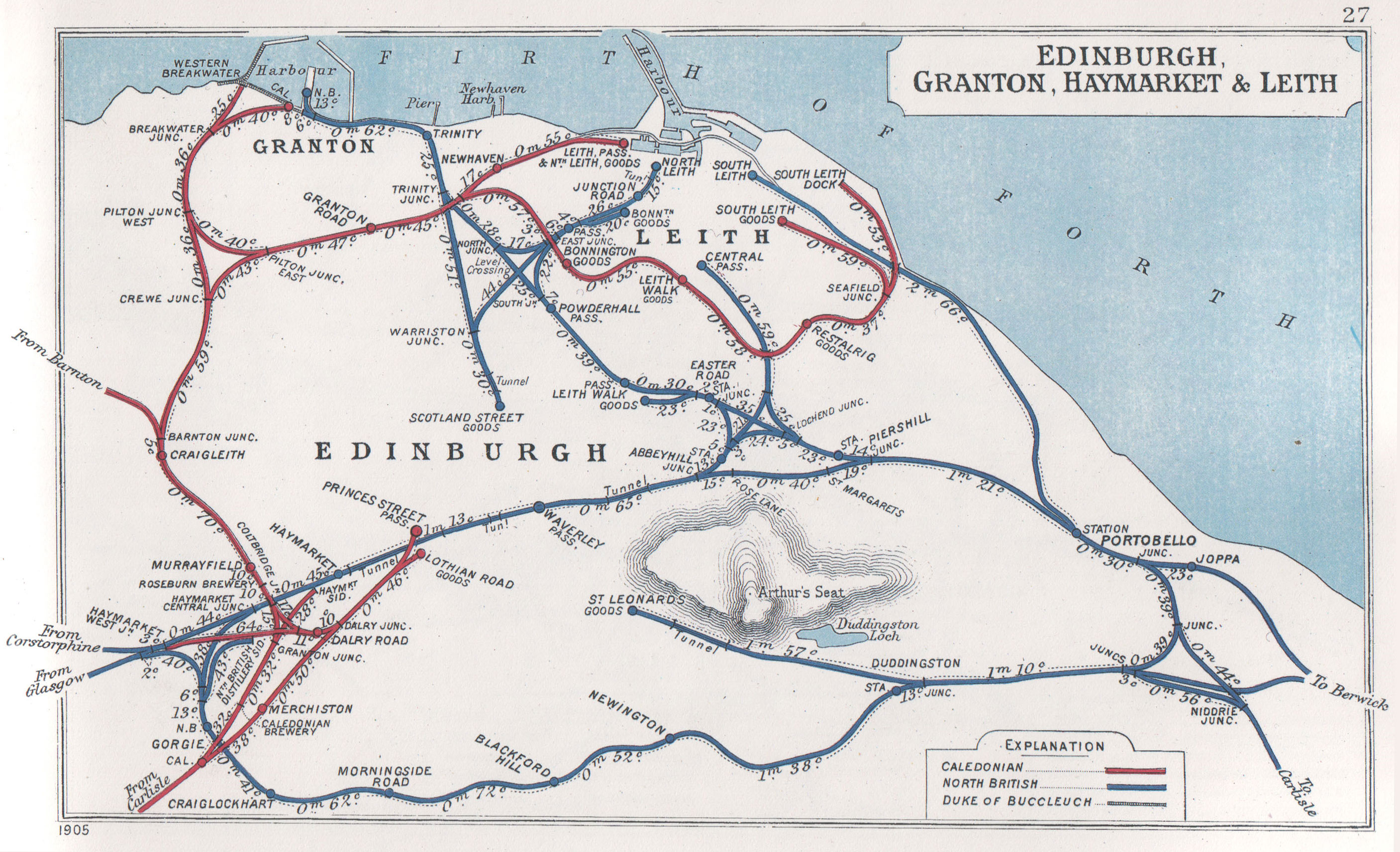
Caledonian lines are shown in red on this 1905 Railway Clearing House map of Edinburgh.

The Caledonian Railway entered Edinburgh from Carstairs on 15 February 1848; its terminus was a one-platform station named Lothian Road. This was the first line to offer travel without change of carriage between Edinburgh and London: passengers on the rival North British Railway needed to cross the River Tweed on foot to continue their rail journey.

The unsatisfactory Edinburgh terminus needed improvement but funds were limited, and the Caledonian built a short spur to Haymarket; talks had taken place about using the E&GR and NBR station, later named Waverley; but the NBR rejected the idea. Eventually in 1870 the Lothian Road station was much improved and extended, and the new terminus was named Princes Street.

Caledonian Railway (Granton Branches) Act 1857
- Act of Parliament
- Parliament of the United Kingdom
- Long title: An Act to enable the Caledonian Railway Company to construct Branch Railways from their Line near Edinburgh to Granton; and for other Purposes.
- Citation: 20 & 21 Vict. c. cxxiii

Dates
- Royal assent: 10 August 1857

Text of statute as originally enacted

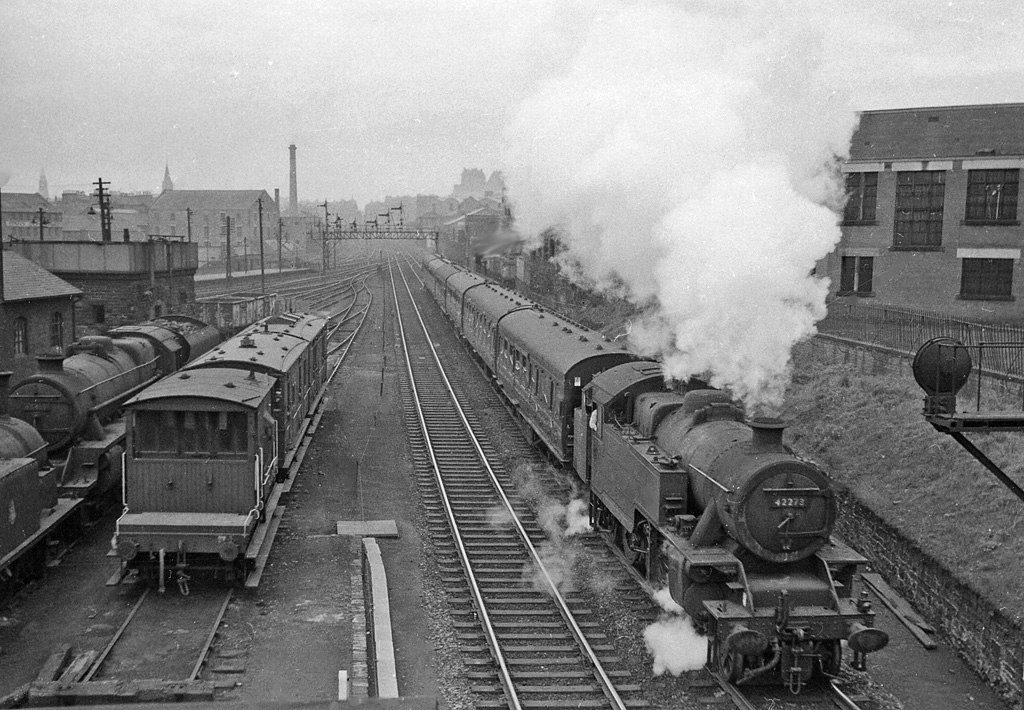
An empty stock train for Princes Street station, passing Dalry Road Locomotive Depot in 1962

The owner of Granton Harbour encouraged, and half-funded, the construction of a branch from near Lothian Road. This was authorised by the Caledonian Railway (Granton Branches) Act 1857 (20 & 21 Vict. c. cxxiii) and this opened in 1861. A branch from the Granton line to Leith Docks was made in 1864. This line was opened to passengers from 1879: the Leith terminal was later renamed Leith North. After 1900 the port authorities built new modern docks to the east of the former Leith docks, and the Caledonian further extended its Leith line to reach the new facilities: the Leith New Lines opened in 1903. It had been planned to open a passenger service on the line, and passenger stations had been built, but tram competition made it clear that an inner suburban passenger railway was unviable and the passenger service was never inaugurated.

The Edinburgh main line passed close to numerous mineral workings, and several short branches and connections were made to collieries, iron workings and shale oil plants. The Wilsontown branch from Auchengray, opened in 1860, was the most significant, and carried a passenger service.

The original Wishaw and Coltness Railway, now leased by the Caledonian, had long since reached Cleland ironworks from the west, and in 1869 the line was extended from near there to Midcalder Junction on the Edinburgh main line, passing through Shotts, Fauldhouse and Midcalder. This line connected to many further mines and industrial sites, and gave the Caledonian a passenger route between Glasgow and Edinburgh that competed with the North British Railway's route through Falkirk.

The first main line had bypassed a considerable centre of industry located on the Water of Leith southwest of Edinburgh, and a branch line to Balerno opened on 1 August 1874. The line was successful in encouraging residential building, especially at Colinton, and also leisure excursions: for a time it was known as "the picnic line", but it too succumbed to more convenient transport facilities by road, and it closed to passengers in 1943.

Speculative residential development encouraged the construction of a line to Barnton, west of Edinburgh. The branch line opened on 1 March 1894; the terminus was named Cramond Brig at first. The Caledonian intended to make the line into a loop, returning to the city by way of Corstorphine, but this idea was shelved.

== Stirling, Perth, Callander and Crieff ==
The Caledonian Railway had intended to lease, or absorb, the Scottish Central Railway (SCR), which obtained its act of Parliament, the Scottish Central Railway Act 1845 (8 & 9 Vict. c. clxi), on the same day as the Caledonian. The SCR needed a partner railway to get access to Glasgow and Edinburgh, but the rival Edinburgh and Glasgow Railway (E&GR) would provide that. The SCR opened from Greenhill Junction with the E&GR to Perth on 22 May 1848, and the Caledonian opened its branch to reach Greenhill Junction on 7 August 1848. The SCR remained independent for some time, mainly because of parliamentary opposition to proposed mergers. The SCR built Perth General station, which became the focus of several railways at that traffic centre, and a joint committee managed the station.

The SCR itself managed to absorb some local railways; the Crieff Junction Railway had opened from Crieff to what later became Gleneagles station in 1856, and it was worked by the SCR and absorbed in 1865.

In 1858 the Dunblane, Doune and Callander Railway was opened in 1858. It achieved considerable significance as the starting point for the Callander and Oban Railway, described below. It was absorbed by the SCR in 1865 immediately before the SCR amalgamated with the Caledonian Railway on 1 August 1865, finally having gained an act of Parliament, the Caledonian and Scottish Central Railways Amalgamation Act 1865 (28 & 29 Vict. c. cclxxxvii), giving it approval to do so.

== North and east of Perth ==
Several railways obtained their acts of Parliament on the same day as the Caledonian, on 31 July 1845. There was a frenzy of railway promotion in that year, and it seemed as if every locality must have its own line. The Scottish Central Railway had been described above; the Scottish Midland Junction Railway (SMJR), the Aberdeen Railway and the Dundee and Perth Railway also got their acts on the same day.

The SMJR built a line from Perth to Forfar; at Perth it used the Scottish Central Railway joint station. The main line ran through the fertile area of Strathmore and the SMJR adopted two existing short lines that were on a suitable alignment. They were the Newtyle and Coupar Angus Railway and the Newtyle and Glammiss Railway. Both were unsuccessful adjuncts to the Dundee and Newtyle Railway, built using stone block sleepers and a track gauge of 4 ft 6 1/2 in (1,384 mm). The two short lines were modernised and altered to double track using standard gauge. At Forfar the SMJR joined the Arbroath and Forfar Railway, another earlier stone block railway, in this case using the track gauge of 5 ft 6 in (1,676 mm). The SMJR opened in 1848.

The Inchture Express was a horse-drawn carriage service operated by the Caledonian Railway Company. Its rails "ran along a hedge-lined route" to Inchture railway station. It later closed and the rails were lifted.

The Aberdeen Railway was to run north from Guthrie, a few miles northwest of Arbroath. Joining the Arbroath and Forfar Railway there, it obtained access to both termini of that line. It was authorised to lease the A&FR. The Aberdeen Railway may have underestimated the cost of upgrading the A&FR's stone block track, and it ran out of money building its own main line; its construction was delayed and it encountered political difficulty in Aberdeen itself. It opened in 1850 to Ferryhill, on the southern margin of the city, extending to Guild Street station in 1854. There were branches to Brechin and Montrose.

At this early stage the Caledonian Railway saw itself as the future creator of an extensive network in Scotland, and it set about gaining control of as many other Scottish railways as possible. It did so not by purchasing them, but by leasing them. This had the advantage that no payment was required at first, only a periodical payment much later. The Caledonian negotiated with the SCR, the SMJR and the Aberdeen Railway and believed it had captured them, but the SCR had other ideas. Much later the Caledonian found that the periodical lease payments were unaffordable, and it was rescued by the legal opinion that the lease agreements had been ultra vires.

The Dundee and Perth Railway opened in 1847; it was taken over by the Scottish Central Railway, and its network came to the Caledonian with the SCR when that company was taken over by the Caledonian in 1865.

The Scottish Midland Junction Railway (SMJR) opened in 1848 from Perth to Forfar, giving onward access to Aberdeen. The SMJR and the Aberdeen Railway amalgamated in 1856 to form the Scottish North Eastern Railway (SNER) in 1856. The SNER did not remain independent for long: it was absorbed by the Caledonian in 1866. At the time of the absorption the SNER and the Great North of Scotland Railway were engaged in building a through line at Aberdeen, with a new Joint station; it opened in 1867.

The Caledonian had now got what it had wanted from the outset: control of an extensive network of lines covering a considerable territorial area. This came at a cost: Parliament became increasingly uncomfortable with monopolies of this kind, and when the North British Railway protested, it was given running powers over much of the Caledonian's northern system. There was worse to come: as the North British approached Dundee with the building of the Tay Bridge, which opened in 1878, the NBR sought and was given joint ownership of the Dundee and Arbroath Railway, which became jointly owned in 1881. The NBR had already built an independent line from Arbroath to Kinnaber Junction, north of Montrose, and so, with the opening in 1890 of the Forth Bridge immediately north of Edinburgh, the NBR now had a rival route to Aberdeen. Competition between the companies on the east and west coast routes from London to Aberdeen led in 1895 to what the press called the Race to the North.

Acquisition of the SNER and other lines brought a number of branch lines to communities off the main line. A number of infill lines were added towards the end of the 19th century. The Dundee and Forfar direct line was opened by the Caledonian in 1870 between Broughty Ferry and Forfar, developing commuter travel to Dundee but otherwise only a rural line. The Forfar and Brechin Railway was promoted as a potential alternative main line; it opened in 1895 but remained simply a rural branch.

== Callander and Oban Railway ==
The Callander and Oban Railway was an independent company intended to connect the western seas to the railway network, but it had been promised financial support by the Scottish Central Railway (SCR). The Caledonian absorbed the SCR in 1865 and the directors were dismayed at the level of commitment to a difficult construction scheme barely started. Construction took many years, reaching a "Killin" station in 1870 and completing in 1880, and money was always desperately tight.

The line was never profitable although it contributed greatly to the development of the town of Oban. A branch was built to Ballachulish, opened in 1903.

The western part of the line from Crianlarich to Oban is open today, connected to the ex-NBR West Highland Line, but the remainder has closed.

== The Strathearn lines ==
The Perth, Almond Valley and Methven Railway opened in 1858 to connect Methven to the SMJR network; it was extended to Crieff when the Crieff and Methven Junction Railway opened in 1866.

Crieff now had two railway connections, using the same station. The upsurge in tourism in Strathearn encouraged many visitors, who used Crieff as a railhead and continued by road. In 1893 the Crieff and Comrie Railway made a short extension into Strathearn, and this encouraged ideas of completing a link right through to the Callander and Oban line. There were wild dreams of Irish cattle imports coming to Perth markets over the route. This became the Lochearnhead, St Fillans and Comrie Railway; due to serious problems raising capital, it took from 1901 to 1905 to open fully. The through traffic never developed and passenger connections at Balquhidder were poor, discouraging through travel.

== Notable accidents ==
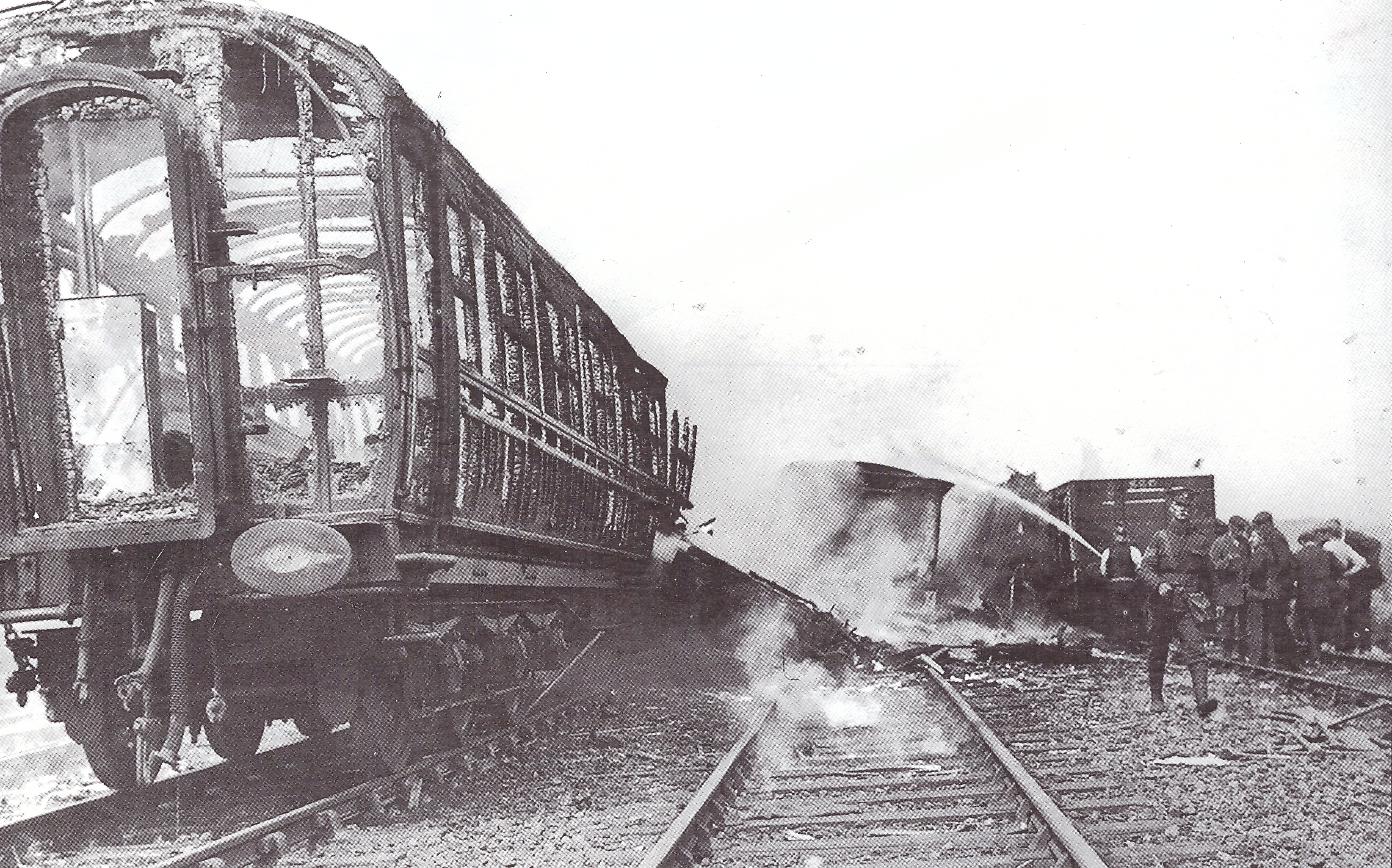
Wreckage at Quintinshill

- On 2 October 1872, an express passenger train was in collision with a freight train that was being shunted at Kirtlebridge on the main line due to errors by the station master and signalman, compounded by a lack of interlocking and absolute block working. Twelve people were killed.
- On 23 October 1899, an express passenger train was in collision with a cattle train at Coupar Angus. One person was killed.
- On 6 April 1906, an express freight train was derailed 2 miles (3.2 km) south of Kirtlebridge due to the failure of a wheel on the third wagon of the train. The derailed wagons fouled the opposite line; an express passenger train ran into them and was derailed. One person was killed and several were injured.
- On 2 April 1909, a passenger train became divided and was derailed at Crawford when the crank axle of the locomotive hauling it failed. A few passengers suffered minor injuries.
- On 16 July 1914, 16-year-old 'wagon greaser' James Beck was walking between two railway lines near Shawfield (Glasgow) when he was hit by an oncoming train and as a result, was killed.
- On 22 May 1915, a troop train was in a head-on collision at Quintinshill due to a signalman's error. An express passenger train then ran into the wreckage. A fire then broke out which killed 226 people and injured 246 in what remains the deadliest railway accident in the United Kingdom as of 2024. Two signalmen were later jailed for culpable homicide.

== Office holders ==
=== Chairmen ===
- Robert Hamilton, 8th Lord Belhaven and Stenton 1844
- William Lockhart MP 1844
- John James Hope Johnstone 1845–1850
- The Hon Edward Plunkett, RN 1850
- John Duncan 1850–1852
- William Baird 1852–1854
- William Johnston 1854–1859
- Thomas Hill 1868–1880
- J.C. Bolton 1880–1897
- James Clark Bunten (engineer) 1898–1901
- Sir James Thompson 1901–1906
- Sir James King, 1st Baronet 1906–1908
- Sir Charles Bine Renshaw, 1st Baronet 1908–1918
- Henry Allan 1918–1923

=== Chief mechanical engineers ===
- Robert Sinclair 1847–1856
- Benjamin Connor 1856–1876
- George Brittain 1876–1882
- Dugald Drummond 1882–1890
- Hugh Smellie 1890
- John Lambie 1891–1895
- John F. McIntosh 1895–1914
- William Pickersgill 1914–1923

== Armorial bearings ==
From July 1865, the Caledonian Railway adopted "a version of the Scottish arms, without, so far as is known, getting the blessing of the Lord Lyon King of Arms". From September 1888 a further riband was added below the Nemo me impune lacessit motto; this bore the words Caledonian Railway Company.

== See also ==
- Carlisle railway history
- Locomotives of the Caledonian Railway

== Bibliography ==
- British railways pre-grouping atlas and gazetteer (3rd ed.). London: Ian Allan. 1963. OCLC 221386661.
- British railways pre-grouping atlas and gazetteer (4th ed.). London: Ian Allan. 1965. OCLC 38260240.
- British railways pre-grouping atlas and gazetteer (5th ed.). Shepperton: Ian Allan. 1972. ISBN 0-7110-0320-3. OCLC 811476.
- British railways pre-grouping atlas and gazetteer (5th edition; 3rd impression ed.). Shepperton: Ian Allan. 1974. ISBN 0-7110-0320-3. OCLC 256832221.
- Conolly, W. Philip (1980). British railways pre-grouping atlas and gazetteer (5th edition; 4th impression ed.). Shepperton: Ian Allan. ISBN 0-7110-0320-3. OCLC 221481275.
- Awdry, Christopher (1990). Encyclopaedia of British Railway Companies. Sparkford: Patrick Stephens Ltd. ISBN 1-8526-0049-7. OCLC 19514063. CN 8983.
- Hammerton, John Alexander (1920). Harmsworth's universal encyclopedia (1st ed.). London: Educational Book Co. OCLC 52464434.
- Hammerton, John Alexander (1925). Harmsworth's universal encyclopedia (Revised ed.). London: Educational Book Co. OCLC 219858827.
- Heap, Christine; Riemsdijk, John van; Science Museum (1985). The pre-grouping railways : their development, and individual characters. London: Her Majesty's Stationery Office. ISBN 0-1129-0432-7. OCLC 19513618.
- Nock, Oswald; Cross, Derek (1960). Main Lines Across the Border (1st ed.). London: Nelson. OCLC 12273673.
- Nock, Oswald; Cross, Derek (1982). Main Lines Across the Border (Revised ed.). Shepperton: Ian Allan. ISBN 0-7110-1118-4. OCLC 11622324.
- Rolt, L. T. C. Red for Danger.
- Robertson, C. J. A. (1983). The Origins of the Scottish Railway System: 1722-1844 (1st ed.). Edinburgh: John Donald Publishers Ltd. ISBN 0-8597-6088-X.
- Thomas, John (1971). A Regional History of the Railways of Great Britain. Vol. VI Scotland: The Lowlands and the Borders (1st ed.). Newton Abbot, Devon: David & Charles. ISBN 0-7153-5408-6. OCLC 16198685.
- Thomas, John; Paterson, Rev A. J. S. (1984). A Regional History of the Railways of Great Britain. Vol. VI Scotland: The Lowlands and the Borders (2nd ed.). Newton Abbott, Devon: David & Charles. ISBN 0-9465-3712-7. OCLC 12521072.
