= Elvanfoot =

Coordinates: 55.437°N 3.6555°W

Elvanfoot: Scottish Gaelic: Bun Albhain; Scots: Elvanfit
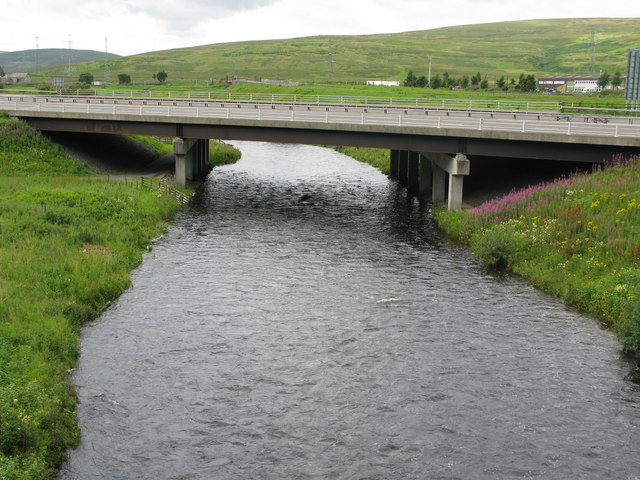
- View of A74(M) crossing the River Clyde near Elvanfoot

- Location within South Lanarkshire
- OS grid reference: NS953171
- Council area: South Lanarkshire
- Lieutenancy area: Lanarkshire
- Country: Scotland
- Sovereign state: United Kingdom
- Post town: BIGGAR
- Postcode district: ML12
- Dialling code: 01864
- Police: Scotland
- Fire: Scottish
- Ambulance: Scottish
- UK Parliament: Dumfriesshire, Clydesdale and Tweeddale
- Scottish Parliament: Clydesdale

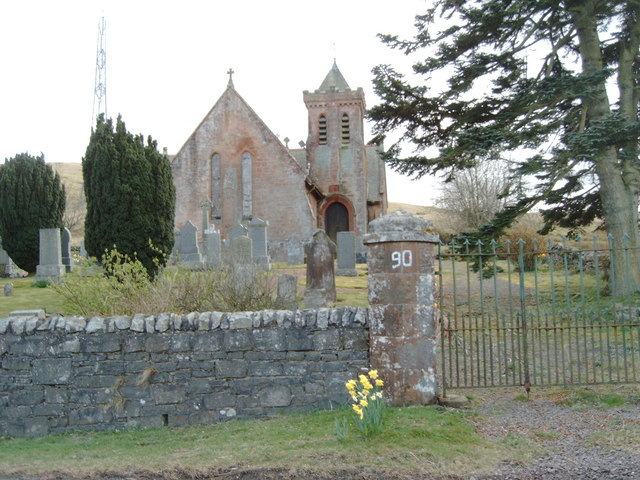
View of Elvanfoot church.

Elvanfoot is a small village in South Lanarkshire, Scotland.

Elvanfoot is located at the confluence of the River Clyde and Elvan Water. The Clyde is crossed by a pedestrian suspension bridge that has been closed since 2007 for want of repair. The unused church is on the Buildings at Risk Register for Scotland, as are the stables of Newton House, once home to the Scottish judge Alexander Irving, Lord Newton.

== Etymology ==
The name 'Elvan' includes the element *al-, which occurs in river names in Roman Britain and continental Europe. A number of meanings have been suggested, including 'bright, shining, white', 'sparkling, speckled' and 'holy' amongst others. Almost all attestations of the root occur with the Proto-Indo-European suffix -*awe- and "root-determinative -*n- or participial -*ant-", giving the proto-form *al-au-n-.

Andrew Breeze has suggested that the name is derived from Cumbric *halẹ:n 'salt', cognate with Welsh halen, which is found in a number of Welsh river names. As Elvan Water passes through a mining area, Breeze suggests that there may be high levels of salt in the river. The loss of initial /h/ could be explained as a result of the name's transmission via Gaelic.

== Transport ==
Elvanfoot is at the junction of the A702 and B7040 roads and 1 1/2 miles (2.4 km) south from junction 14 of the M74 motorway. Until 1965, it was served by Elvanfoot railway station on the West Coast Main Line. The village is also served by the number 102 bus from Edinburgh to Dumfries, which operates once daily in each direction, There used to be two buses per day, but this was cut due to council funding being reduced.
