= LSWR X6 class =

Class of steam locomotive

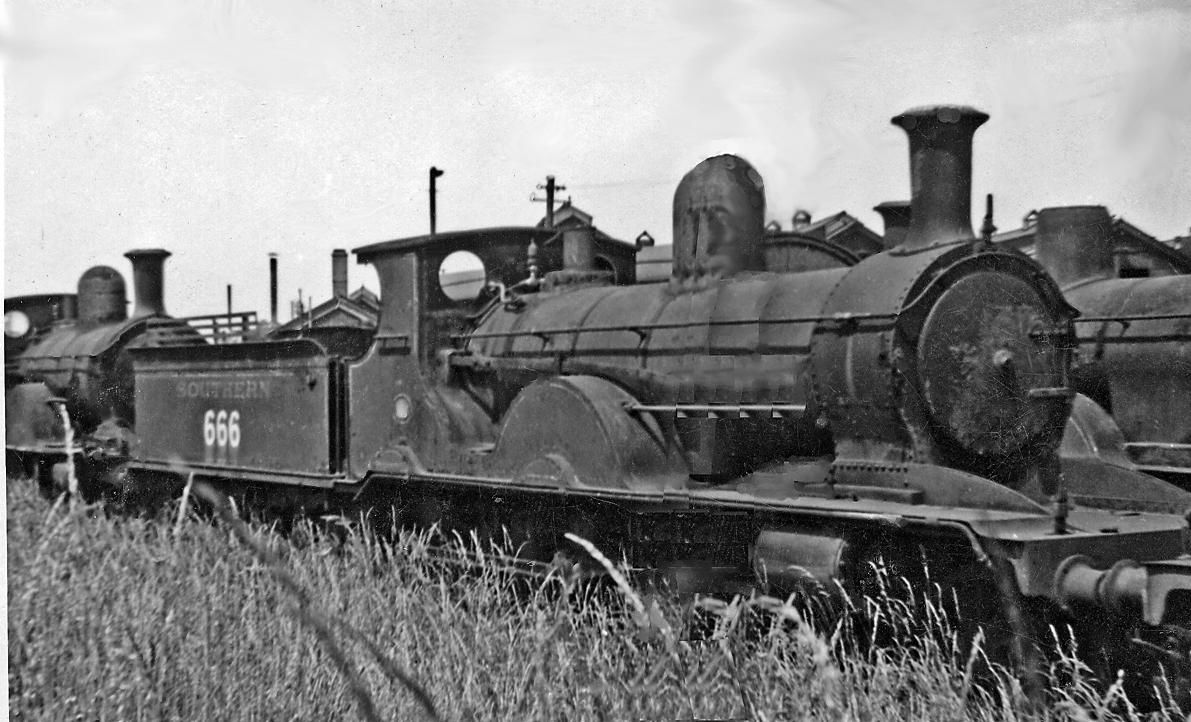
- No. 666 was built 1892, withdrawn 1943
Type and origin
- Power type: Steam
- Designer: William Adams
- Builder: LSWR Nine Elms Works
- Build date: 1895–1896
- Total produced: 10
Specifications
- Configuration
  - Whyte: 4-4-0
  - UIC: 2′B n2
- Gauge: 4 ft 8 1/2 in (1,435 mm)
- Leading dia.: 3 ft 7 in (1.092 m)
- Driver dia.: 6 ft 7 in (2.007 m)
- Length: 54 ft 5 3/8 in (16.60 m)
- Height: 13 ft 2 3/4 in (4.03 m)
- Fuel type: Coal
- Boiler pressure: 175 psi (1.21 MPa)
- Cylinders: Two, outside
- Cylinder size: 19 in × 26 in (483 mm × 660 mm)
Performance figures
- Tractive effort: 17,673 lbf (78.6 kN)
Career
- Operators: LSWR · Southern Railway
- Class: X6
- Power class: SR: I
- Withdrawn: 1933–1946
- Disposition: All scrapped

The LSWR X6 class was a class of express passenger 4-4-0 steam locomotives designed for the London and South Western Railway by William Adams. Ten were ordered in November 1894 and constructed at Nine Elms Locomotive Works between 1895 and 1896.

The class were numbered 657–666, and just as the T3 class were a smaller-wheeled version of the X2 class, the X6 class were a smaller-wheeled version of the T6 class. The boiler was identical to that used the T6 class. Some of the engines were subsequently fitted with a Drummond boiler, including No. 658 which was the last Adams 4-4-0 to remain in service.

Table of locomotive orders
Year	Order	Quantity	LSWR Numbers	Notes
1895	X6	6	657–662	
1896	X6	4	663–666	

Ten more, nos. 667–696, were ordered in March 1895, but these were cancelled by Drummond in February 1896, before any work had been carried out.

All passed to the Southern Railway at the grouping in 1923. Withdrawals started in 1933, and by the start of World War II, only five remained. Four were retired during the war, leaving only No. 658, which was withdrawn in December 1946. All were scrapped.

Table of withdrawals
Year	Quantity in service at start of year	Quantity withdrawn	Locomotive numbers	Notes
1933	10	2	662, 665	
1936	8	3	660, 661, 663	
1940	5	1	657	
1943	4	3	659, 664, 666	
1946	1	1	658	
