= LSWR T6 class =

Class of two-cylinder 4-4-0 locomotives

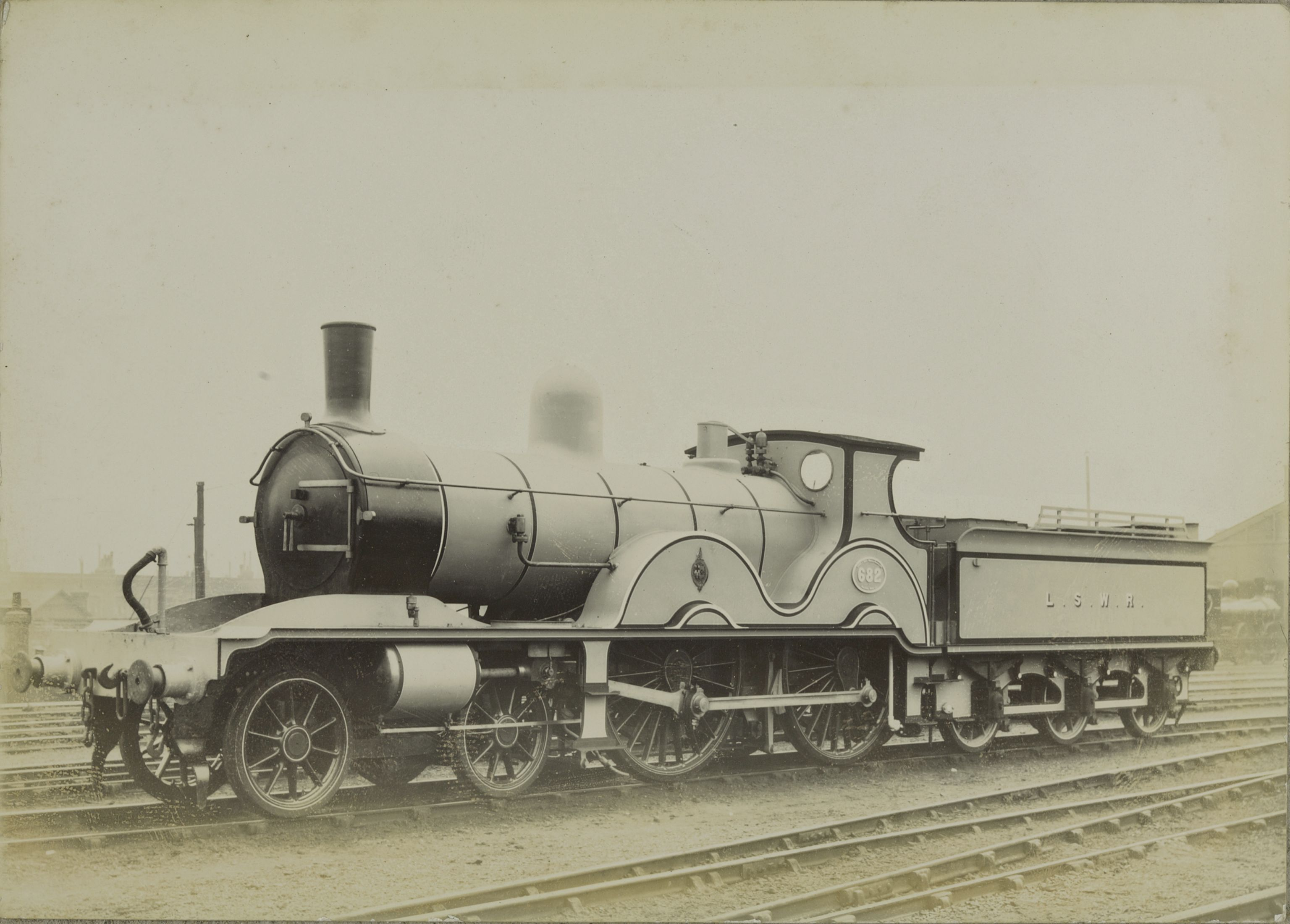
Type and origin
- Power type: Steam
- Designer: William Adams
- Builder: LSWR Nine Elms Works
- Build date: 1895–1896
- Total produced: 10
Specifications
- Configuration
  - Whyte: 4-4-0
  - UIC: 2′B n2
- Gauge: 4 ft 8 1/2 in (1,435 mm)
- Leading dia.: 3 ft 9 3/4 in (1.162 m)
- Driver dia.: 7 ft 1 in (2.159 m)
- Length: 54 ft 5 3/8 in (16.60 m)
- Height: 13 ft 2 3/4 in (4.03 m)
- Axle load: 16.20 long tons (16.46 t)
- Adhesive weight: 31.70 long tons (32.21 t)
- Loco weight: 50.125 long tons (50.929 t)
- Tender weight: 36.20 long tons (36.78 t)
- Fuel type: Coal
- Fuel capacity: 3.00 long tons (3.05 t)
- Water cap.: 3,300 imperial gallons (15,000 L; 4,000 US gal)
- Boiler pressure: 175 psi (1.21 MPa)
- Cylinders: Two, outside
- Cylinder size: 19 in × 26 in (483 mm × 660 mm)
Performance figures
- Tractive effort: 16,426 lbf (73.1 kN)
Career
- Operators: LSWR · Southern Railway
- Class: T6
- Power class: SR: I
- Withdrawn: 1933–1943
- Disposition: All scrapped

The LSWR T6 class was a class of express passenger 4-4-0 steam locomotives designed for the London and South Western Railway by William Adams. Ten were constructed at Nine Elms Locomotive Works between 1895 and 1896.

The class were numbered 677–686, and were a development of the X2 class, based on experience gained with the locomotives in traffic. The boiler was based on that used in the T3 class, and shared the main dimensions.

Table of locomotive orders
Year	Order	Quantity	LSWR Numbers	Notes
1895	T6	10	677–686	

All passed to the Southern Railway at the grouping in 1923. Withdrawals started in 1933, and by the end of 1937 only two remained. No. 684 went in 1940, and the last, 681 was retired in April 1943. All were scrapped.

Table of withdrawals
Year	Quantity in service at start of year	Quantity withdrawn	Locomotive numbers	Notes
1933	10	2	677, 683	
1936	8	4	678, 682, 685, 686	
1937	4	2	679, 680	
1940	2	1	684	
1943	1	1	681	
