= LSWR O2 class =

British steam locomotive class (1889–1967)

LSWR/SR O2
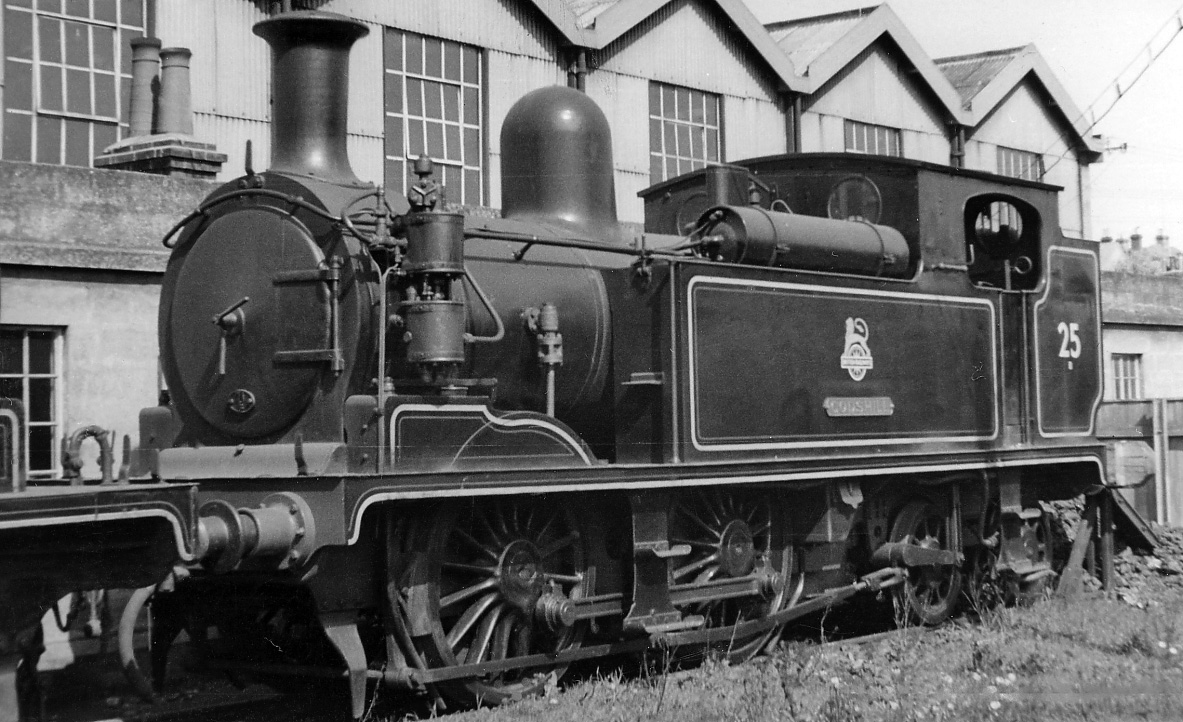
- W25 Godshill at Ryde St John's Road loco shed
Type and origin
- Power type: Steam
- Designer: William Adams
- Builder: LSWR Nine Elms Works
- Build date: 1889–1895
- Total produced: 60
Specifications
- Configuration
  - Whyte: 0-4-4T
  - UIC: B2′ n2t
- Gauge: 4 ft 8 1/2 in (1,435 mm) standard gauge
- Driver dia.: 4 ft 10 in (1.473 m)
- Trailing dia.: 36 in (0.914 m)
- Length: 30 ft 8.5 in (9.360 m)
- Loco weight: 48.40 long tons (49.18 t; 54.21 short tons)
- Fuel type: Coal
- Fuel capacity: 1.50 long tons (1.52 t; 1.68 short tons); later 3.25 long tons (3.30 t; 3.64 short tons)
- Water cap.: 800 imp gal (3,600 L; 960 US gal)
- Boiler pressure: 160 psi (1.10 MPa)
- Cylinders: Two, inside
- Cylinder size: 17 1/2 in × 24 in (444 mm × 610 mm)
Performance figures
- Tractive effort: 17,235 lbf (76.67 kN)
Career
- Operators: London and South Western Railway, Southern Railway, British Railways
- Class: LSWR: O2; SR: O2
- Power class: Isle of Wight: B BR: 0P
- Locale: Great Britain
- Withdrawn: 1933 – 1967
- Disposition: One preserved, remainder scrapped

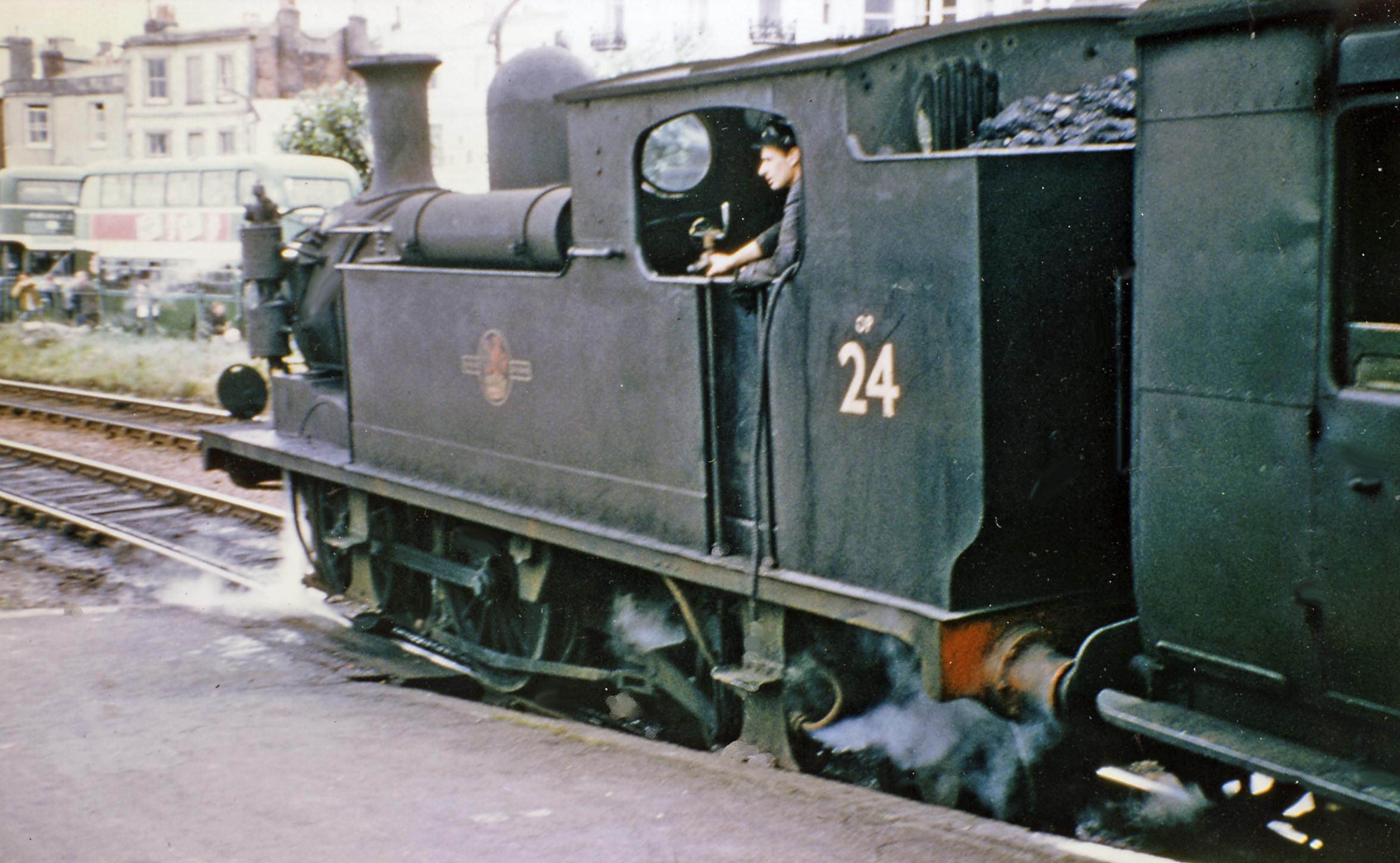
Ex-LSWR O2 class 0-4-4T at Ryde Esplanade in 1965

The LSWR O2 class is a class of 0-4-4T steam locomotive designed for the London and South Western Railway by William Adams. Sixty were constructed during the late nineteenth century. They were also the last steam engines to work on the Isle of Wight, with the final two being withdrawn in 1967. One has been preserved and is operational.

== Background ==
Adams was presented with the problem of a greatly increasing volume of commuter traffic experienced with the suburbanisation of London during the 1880s. This was exacerbated by the fact that there were few locomotive classes in the LSWR stable that could undertake commuter traffic at the desired level of efficiency. The LSWR therefore required a locomotive with attributes of power and compactness, with a small wheel size to gain acceleration on intensive timetables. Adams settled upon the 0-4-4T wheel arrangement to provide the basis of what was to become the O2 Class.

== Construction history ==
The second of William Adams' 0-4-4T designs, the O2 class was a development of his previous T1 class of 1888. The brief behind the design was to create a locomotive capable of mixed-traffic operations, a characteristic dictated by the relatively small wheel diameter and smaller cylinders, effectively to replace the obsolete Beattie 0298 Class. As a result, a compact locomotive with high route availability was produced, a factor that would be essential during the later career of the class.

Production began in 1889, with the first 20 being constructed at the LSWR's Nine Elms Locomotive Works. The success of the locomotive ensured that a second batch of 30 locomotives was ordered the next year. A final batch of ten was constructed by 1895.

| Order | Years | Quantity | LSWR numbers | Notes |
|---|---|---|---|---|
| O2 | 1889–90 | 10 | 177–186 | |
| B3 | 1890–91 | 10 | 187–196 | |
| K3 | 1891 | 10 | 197–206 | |
| D4 | 1891–92 | 20 | 207–226 | |
| R6 | 1894–95 | 10 | 227–236 | |

== Operational history (mainland) ==
=== 1889–1922: LSWR ===
The class was initially used intensively on London suburban services, but began to be replaced on these as early as 1897 by the introduction of the more powerful Drummond M7 and T1 classes. As a result, the O2s were cascaded to lighter services, and became distributed throughout the LSWR system, being of particular use on restricted branch lines due to their relatively low weight and short wheelbase.

=== 1923–1948: Southern Railway ===
All of the O2s survived to be taken into Southern Railway ownership after the Grouping in 1923. They continued to be used across the former LSWR network, however, electrification and the introduction of more modern types started to make them redundant. This allowed the Southern Railway to send the first 2 spare examples across to the Isle of Wight (see below). Other redundant mainland locomotives were withdrawn, with eight going in the 1930s, and four more in the 1940s.A small number (less than 10) were fitted with Push-Pull controls; One example worked the line from Lee on Solent to Fareham with a 2 coach gated push-pull set (the loco being replaced under BR with an A1X Push-Pull equipped Terrier with just the driving trailer). Another example of push pull operation working was from Guildford to Leatherhead with a 2 coach ex-LSWR Maunsell converted Lav Non-corridor Suburban Push-Pull set with initially 2 driving cabs (under BR this was reduced to the engine with a single driving trailer)

=== 1948–1967: British Railways ===
Despite the early withdrawals, a number of O2s lasted well into BR days, working various branch lines until closure began to take place in the late 1950s and early 1960s. As a result, the mainland O2s became redundant and the last to go was number 30225 in 1962.

== Isle of Wight ==
The class is usually most associated with the Isle of Wight railway system, with the Isle of Wight Central Railway making enquires as to the possibility of purchasing some class members in the early twentieth century. This plan fell through, however, and it was not until after Grouping in 1923 that the newly formed Southern Railway was forced to resolve the desperate locomotive power situation on the Isle of Wight.

The solution to this problem presented itself when electrification of the LSWR's suburban network resulted in a cascade of newer, more powerful designs (such as the M7s and T1s) into the rural strongholds of the O2 class. As a result, several O2s became surplus to mainland requirements. Two of these spare engines were modified at Eastleigh works with the addition of a Westinghouse air brakes to allow compatibility with the Isle of Wight coaching stock. These two O2s were shipped across the Solent in 1923 and trialled extensively on services across the island, particularly on the intensive Ryde–Ventnor services, which they proved highly capable of handling. Further engines were then shipped across in small batches during the 1920s and 1930s.

The final two O2s were sent to the island in 1949 after nationalisation the previous year, resulting in a total of 23 locomotives on the island's lines. Due to tunnel restrictions at Ventnor none of the final series of ten with the higher cab roofs were sent. Thanks to their compact nature, low weight and relatively high power they proved ideal for island duties, although the lack of adequate coal bunker space initially hampered the class. Thus from 1932, a much larger extended bunker was fitted to W19 (formerly 206), and this design subsequently became the standard for all the island locomotives. They handled trains of up to six bogie coaches on all the Island lines, including the 1-in-70 Apse bank from Shanklin to Wroxall.

After the withdrawal of the last LB&SCR E1 class in 1960, the O2 became the only locomotive class on the island. They survived in service until the end of steam services on the island, with an O2 operating the final train on 31 December 1966.

Two examples, numbers W24 Calbourne and W31 Chale, were retained to work engineers' trains during the electrification of the surviving Ryde–Shanklin line. Both were withdrawn on completion of the electrification project in March 1967.

== Livery, names and numbering ==
=== LSWR ===
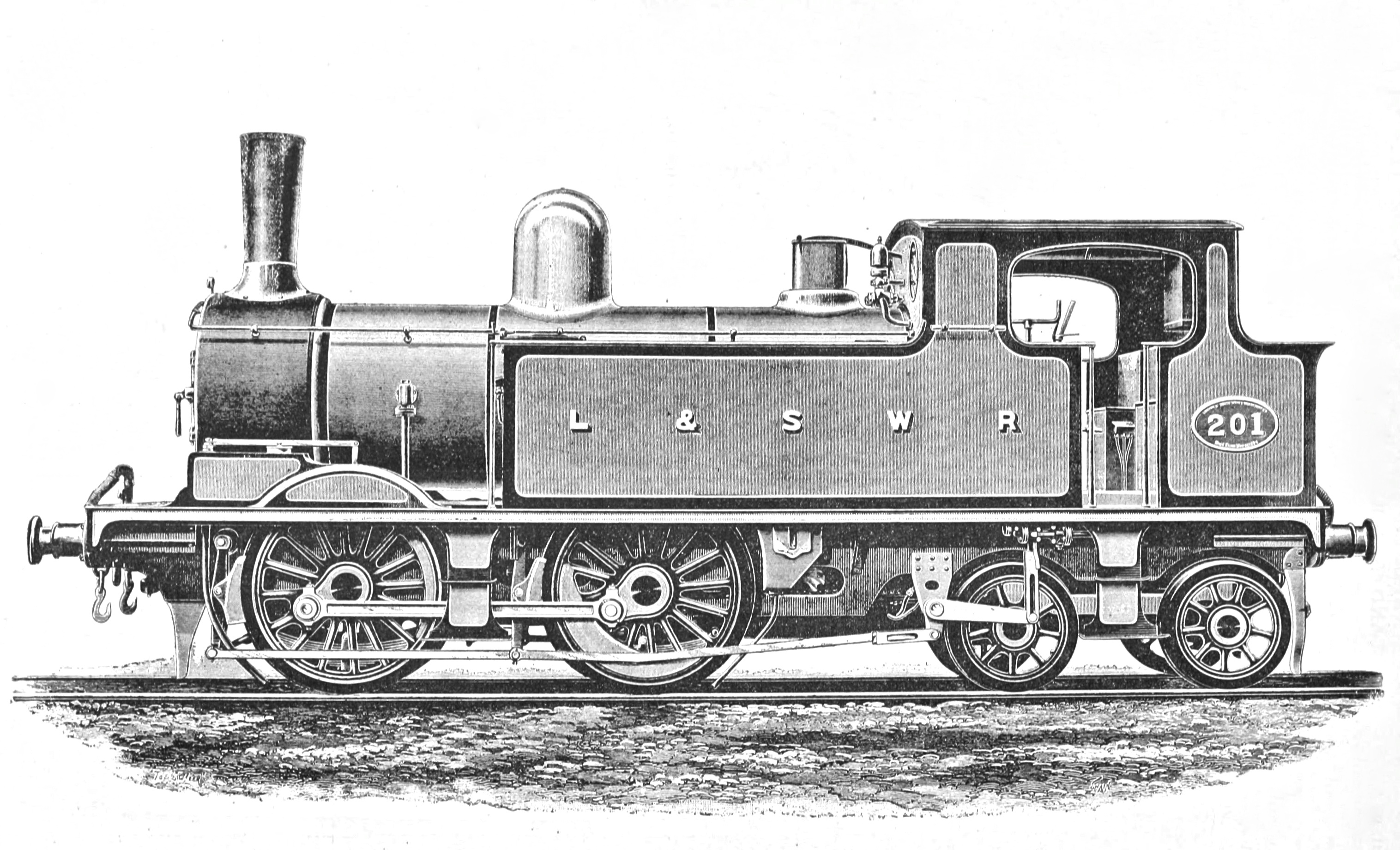
No. 201, before 1894

Initially outshopped in early LSWR passenger Yellow Ochre/Brown livery with the initials 'LSW' on the water tank sides. This was eventually superseded by the later LSWR Passenger Sage Green livery, with black edging and black and white lining. Numbering was in gilt, as was the 'LSWR' lettering on the water tank side.

Only a solitary mainland locomotive ever carried a name in service: Number 185 Alexandra for a short period between 1890 and 1896.

=== Southern Railway ===
In Southern Railway days, the O2s were painted in Maunsell lined Olive Green and then subsequently Bulleid Malachite Green with Sunshine lettering. The LSWR numbers were retained by the Southern Railway, with mainland locomotives allocated numbers in the series between 177 and 236.

Locomotives on the Isle of Wight were renumbered in a separate sequence with the prefix "W" and taking the next available number, or the number of the withdrawn locomotive they were sent over to replace. Eventually, those on the island occupied the entire sequence between W14 and W36. All the O2s allocated to the Isle of Wight were named after places on the island.

=== British Railways ===
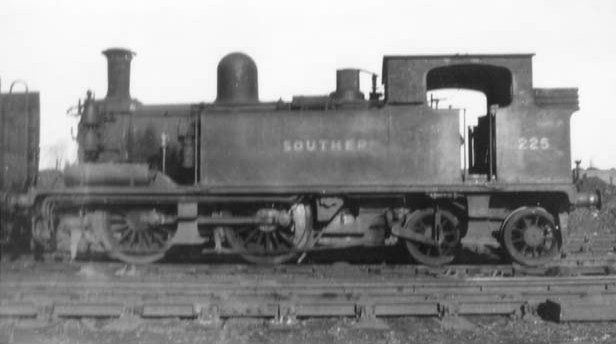
No. 225 pictured in 1948

The class was given the Power Classification of 0P, and initially carried the Southern livery with the addition of 'British Railways' on the water tank sides, though this was promptly changed to the BR Standard Mixed-Traffic Black livery with red and white lining.

The Isle of Wight's unique numbering system was retained on the BR examples on the island, along with the names.

The mainland complement were renumbered by the addition of 30000 to their existing Southern Railway numbers to give a new number in the 30177 to 30236 sequence.

== Preservation ==
The two Isle of Wight locomotives, W24 and W31, were used on engineering trains survived long enough for preservation attempts to be made. However, the attempt to preserve W31 Chale failed and it was scrapped in 1967. W24 Calbourne was bought by the Wight Locomotive Society, which in 1971 moved its headquarters to Havenstreet and became the Isle of Wight Steam Railway. Calbourne was restored to operating condition, re-entering service in 1992, and had a further overhaul in 2010, hauling tourist trains over the line between Smallbrook Junction and Wootton. A further overhaul began in 2019 and was completed in 2021 for the locomotive's 130th anniversary and the railway's 50th.

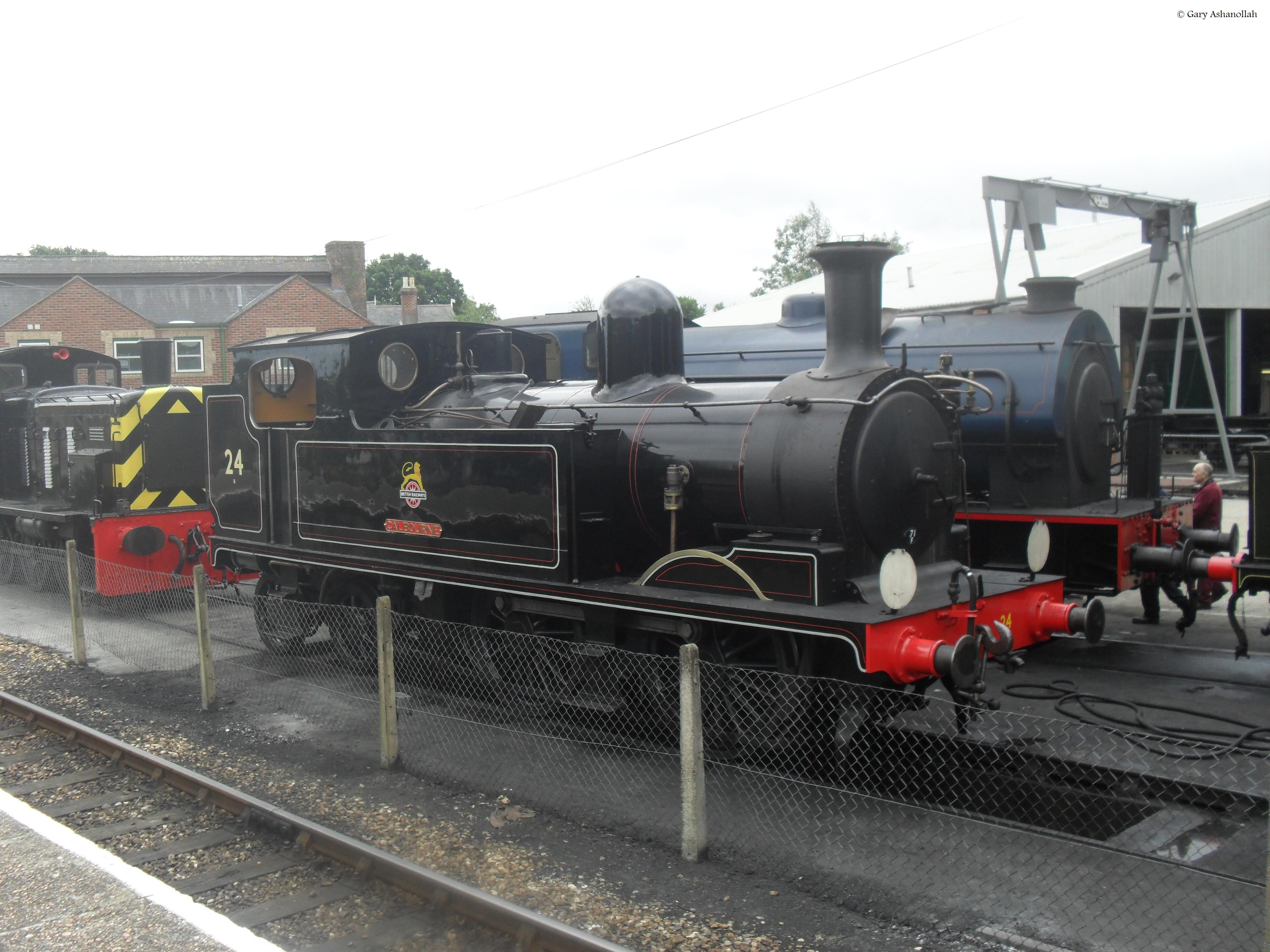
W24 Calbourne in BR lined black livery, August 2010

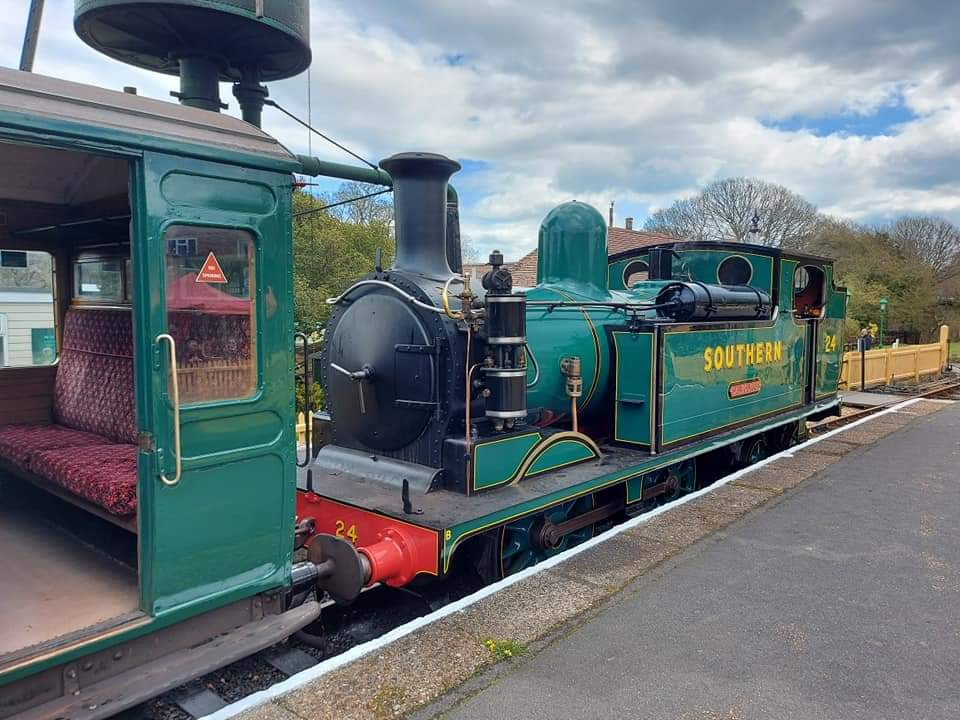
W24 Calbourne in Southern Malachite Green livery, June 2021

Calbourne is the sole survivor of the O2 locomotives; the rest of the class were scrapped.

Table of withdrawals
| Year | Quantity in service at start of year | Quantity withdrawn | Locomotive numbers | Notes |
|---|---|---|---|---|
| 1933 | 60 | 6 | 189, 191, 194, 222, 227, 235 | |
| 1937 | 54 | 2 | 196, 234 | |
| 1940 | 52 | 2 | 185, 214 | |
| 1943 | 50 | 1 | 228 | |
| 1945 | 49 | 1 | 187 | |
| 1953 | 48 | 5 | 30197, 30204, 30213, 30221, 30231 | |
| 1955 | 43 | 4 | 30203, W19, W23, W34 | |
| 1956 | 39 | 2 | 30230, W15 | |
| 1957 | 37 | 2 | 30207, 30216 | |
| 1958 | 35 | 2 | 30224, 30233 | |
| 1959 | 33 | 4 | 30177, 30179, 30212, 30232 | |
| 1960 | 29 | 2 | 30182, 30236 | |
| 1961 | 27 | 4 | 30183, 30192, 30223, 30229 | |
| 1962 | 23 | 5 | 30193, 30199, 30200, 30225, W25 | |
| 1964 | 18 | 2 | W32, W36 | |
| 1965 | 16 | 2 | W18, W30 | |
| 1966 | 14 | 12 | W14, W16, W17, W20–W22, W26–W29, W33, W35 | |
| 1967 | 2 | 2 | W24, W31 | |

== Models ==
DJ Models has produced OO gauge ready-to-run models of the O2 class in both mainland and IOW variants. For O gauge, a 7mm brass kit of the O2 is produced by Connoisseur Models, both mainland and Isle of Wight versions are covered. Roxey Models have a 7mm white metal kit with nickel silver chassis; mainland and IOW versions are covered.

EFE Rail (part of Bachmann) have re-introduced the OO gauge Kernow model with five versions in 2024 viz. LSWR, two Southern and two black BR.
