= Class 460 =

Class 460 or 460 class may refer to:

- British Rail Class 460
- FS Class ETR 460
- LSWR 460 class
- OSE class 460
