= LSWR 380 class =

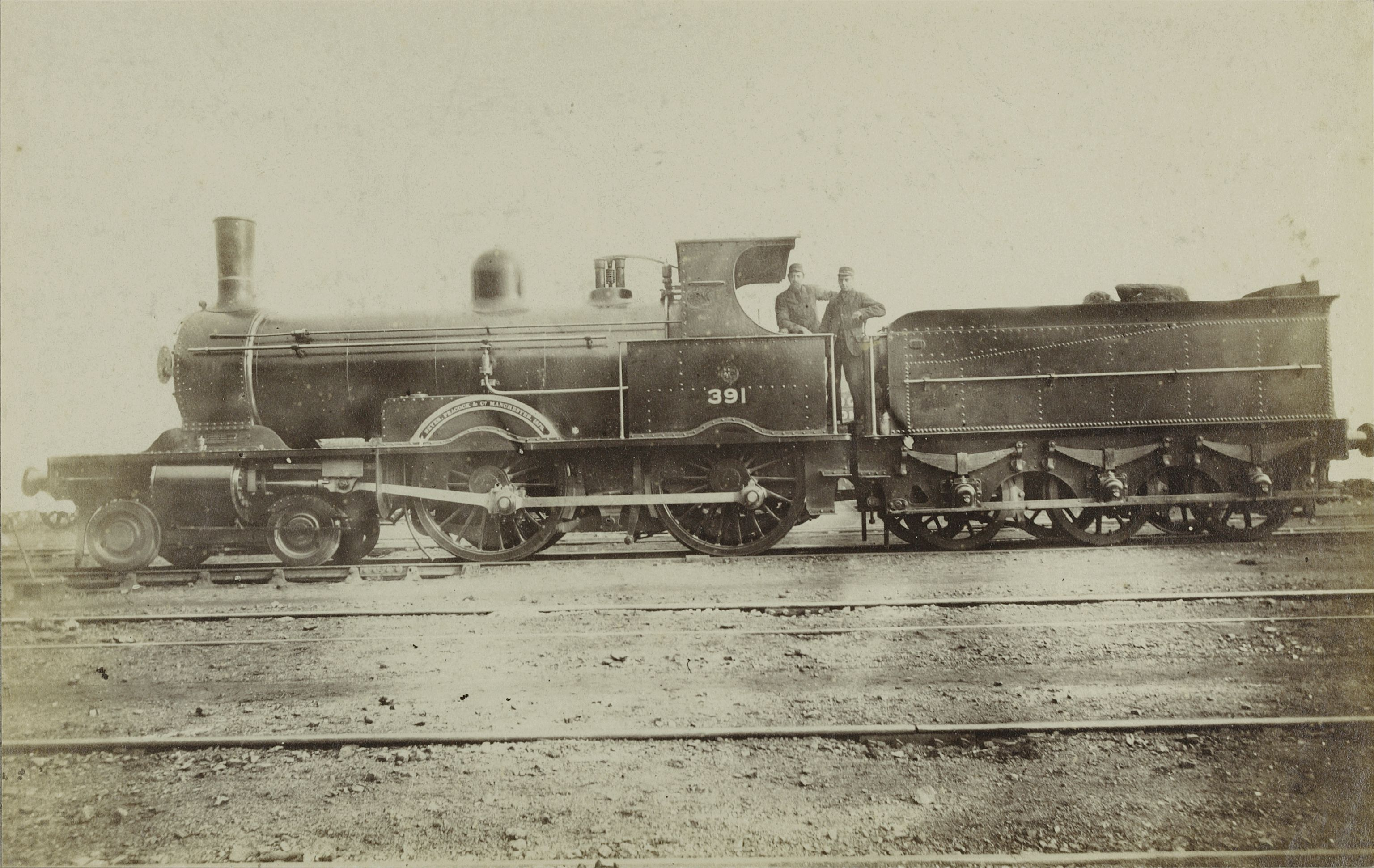
Type and origin
- Power type: Steam
- Designer: William Adams
- Builder: Beyer, Peacock and Company
- Serial number: 1854–1865
- Build date: 1879
- Total produced: 12
Specifications
- Configuration
  - Whyte: 4-4-0
- Gauge: 4 ft 8 1/2 in (1,435 mm)
- Leading dia.: 2 ft 6 in (0.762 m)
- Driver dia.: 5 ft 7 in (1.702 m)
- Fuel type: Coal
- Boiler pressure: 160 lbf/in^{2} (1.10 MPa)
- Cylinders: Two, outside
- Cylinder size: 18 in × 24 in (457 mm × 610 mm)
Performance figures
- Tractive effort: 15,784 lbf (70.21 kN)
Career
- Operators: London and South Western Railway; Southern Railway
- Power class: SR: J
- Nicknames: Steamrollers
- Locale: Great Britain
- Withdrawn: 1913–1924
- Disposition: All scrapped

The LSWR 380 class was a class of 4-4-0 tender locomotives designed by William Adams for the London and South Western Railway and introduced about 1879. They were built by Beyer, Peacock and Company and received LSWR numbers 380–391. They were nicknamed "steam rollers" because of their small solid bogie wheels. The design was developed from Adams' 46 class 4-4-0T, later rebuilt as 4-4-2T.

Twelve were purchased in 1879 and were numbered 380 to 391. They were all placed on the duplicate list as 0380 to 0391 in 1902. Four were withdrawn in 1913; and five of the remaining eight were renumbered again in 1914, still on the duplicate list. These eight all passed to the Southern Railway in 1923, but all were withdrawn by the end of 1925.

Table of withdrawals
Year	Quantity in service at start of year	Quantity withdrawn	Locomotive numbers	Notes
1913	12	4	0383, 0387, 0389, 0391	
1923	8	1	E0160 (ex 382)	
1924	7	6	E0380, E0381, E0384, E0288 (ex 385); E0277 (ex 386), E0337 (ex 390)	
1925	1	1	E0162 (ex 388)	

== See also ==
- Adams bogie
