= GER Class 527 =

Class of British steam locomotives

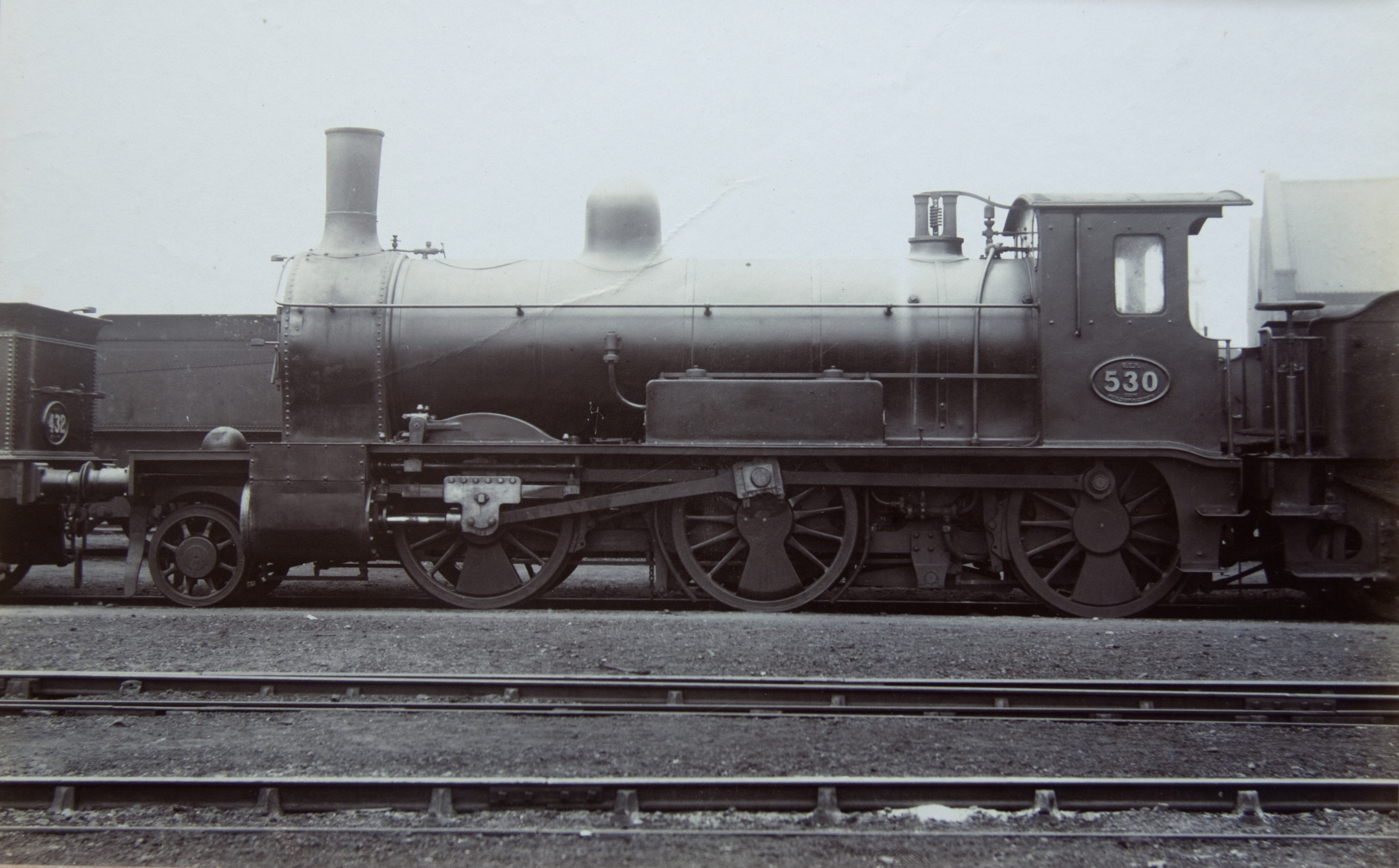
- Class 527 No. 530
Type and origin
- Power type: Steam
- Designer: William Adams
- Builder: Neilson and Company
- Build date: 1878–1879
- Total produced: 15
Specifications
- Configuration
  - Whyte: 2-6-0
  - UIC: 1′C n2g
- Gauge: 4 ft 8 1/2 in (1,435 mm)
- Driver dia.: 4 ft 10 in (1.473 m)
- Loco weight: 46 long tons 10 cwt (104,200 lb or 47.2 t)
- Fuel type: Coal
- Firebox
  - Grate area: 17.8 sq ft (1.65 m^{2})
- Boiler pressure: 140 psi (0.97 MPa)
- Heating surface: 1,393 sq ft (129.4 m^{2})
- Cylinders: Two, outside
- Cylinder size: 19 in × 26 in (480 mm × 660 mm)
Career
- Operators: Great Eastern Railway
- Numbers: 527–541
- Nicknames: Mogul
- Withdrawn: 1885–1887
- Disposition: All scrapped

The GER Class 527 was a class of fifteen 2-6-0 steam tender locomotives designed by William Adams for the Great Eastern Railway (GER). This was the last design that Adams prepared for the GER, although they did not enter service until his successor Massey Bromley had taken office and incorporated some modifications to the design.

== Overview ==
In order to haul heavier trains and compete for the coal traffic into London, the GER asked William Adams to design a locomotive capable of hauling a train of 400 long tons net (700 tons gross).

=== Prototype ===
Tests were carried out with 265 class 4-4-0s to ensure that such trailing loads were feasible, followed by a prototype 2-6-0 number 527. Number 527 was the first locomotive in Britain to use the 2-6-0 wheel arrangement, and was named Mogul after the Great Moguls of Delhi, the epithet becoming the generic name for locomotives with that wheel arrangement.

=== Numbering ===
As was the GER's practice for locomotives built by outside contractors, the class was referred to by the number of the first locomotive, subsequent locomotives being numbered sequentially up to 541.

== Performance ==
They were used on coal trains from Peterborough to London, but were found uneconomic, and so had short lives, being withdrawn between 1885 and 1887. As the design was novel, unexpected problems were encountered; the steam pipes to the cylinders constantly worked loose and were inaccessible for repair, condensation occurred in the cylinders, and these combined with a relatively small grate area and boiler barrel diameter with a long barrel led to poor steaming and high coal consumption. The pony truck also gave problems. Hence, the earlier Johnson 0-6-0s were preferred.

== Belgian State 512 ==
In order to compete with the quite archaic Type 28 and Type 29 locomotives, Belgian State Railways ordered a copy of the 527 class, built by Neilson & Co. in 1881. This lone engine, used on heavy trains between Jemelle and Arlon on the Luxembourg line, performed poorly.

In 1894, it was used as a test bed for a new kind of boiler designed by the Belgian engineer Mr. Docteur. It featured a steam reservoir perched atop the boiler and a firebox made of refractory brick and surrounded by air instead of water. The original cylinders were kept but the Wilson safety valves were replaced by Ramsbottom valves and a second-hand two-axle tender replaced the 3-axle tender. However, this prototype was quickly withdrawn and sent for breaking up in 1906.
