= 135 class =

135 class or Class 135 may refer to:

- LSWR 135 class, 4-4-0 steam locomotives
- ÖBB Class 135, 2-6-2 steam locomotives
