= 445 class =

445 class or Class 445 may refer to:

- British Rail Class 445, prototype electric multiple units
- LSWR 445 class, 4-4-0 steam locomotives
