= LSWR B4 class =

British steam locomotive

LSWR B4 Class
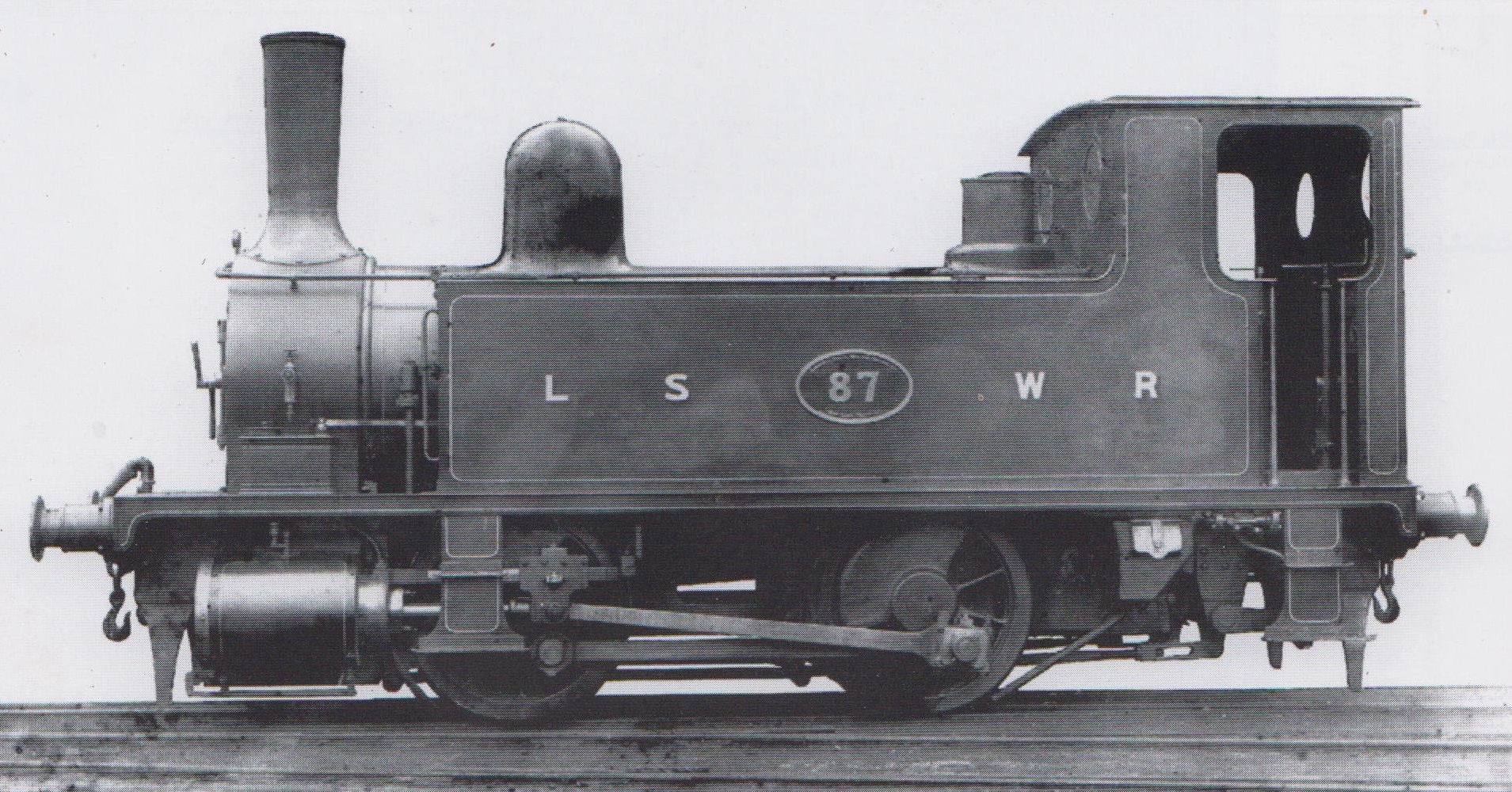
- No. 87 as built with a stovepipe chimney and a full cab.
Type and origin
- Power type: Steam
- Designer: William Adams
- Builder: LSWR Nine Elms Locomotive Works
- Build date: 1891 (10), 1893 (10), 1908 (5)
- Total produced: 25
Specifications
- Configuration
  - Whyte: 0-4-0T
  - UIC: Bn2t
- Gauge: 4 ft 8 1/2 in (1,435 mm) standard gauge
- Driver dia.: 3 ft 9 3/4 in (1.162 m)
- Wheelbase: 7 ft 0 in (2.134 m)
- Length: 24 ft 10 1/2 in (7.58 m)
- Height: 12 ft (3.66 m)
- Loco weight: 33.4 long tons (33.9 t; 37.4 short tons) B4; 32.9 long tons (33.4 t; 36.8 short tons) K14
- Fuel type: Coal
- Fuel capacity: 0.5 long tons (0.51 t; 0.56 short tons)
- Water cap.: 600 imp gal (2,700 L; 720 US gal)
- Firebox
  - Grate area: 10.75 sq ft (0.999 m^{2})
- Boiler pressure: 140 psi (0.97 MPa)
- Cylinders: Two (outside)
- Cylinder size: 16 in × 22 in (406 mm × 559 mm)
Performance figures
- Tractive effort: 14,650 lbf (65.17 kN)
Career
- Operators: London and South Western Railway; Southern Railway; British Railways
- Class: LSWR: B4 (also LSWR K14 Class); SR: B4
- Power class: BR: 0F, later 1F
- Retired: 1948–1963
- Disposition: Two preserved, remainder scrapped

The London and South Western Railway B4 class is a class of 0-4-0 tank engines originally designed for station piloting and dock shunting. They were later used extensively in Southampton Docks for nearly half a century.

== Design ==
The locomotives were designed by the London and South Western Railway (LSWR) Locomotive Superintendent William Adams. They were unusual in having inside Stephenson valve gear but outside cylinders and coal bunkers on the footplate inside the cab. The class were originally built with Adams' stovepipe chimney, although these were later replaced by a lipped version designed by Adams' successor, Dugald Drummond. Some examples also had cut away cabs to improve visibility. They were designed for shunting in locations with a sharp curves, such as the dockyard at Devonport and as pilots at the major stations.

== Construction ==
The LSWR originally ordered ten locomotives in 1890 from its Nine Elms Works. The class was designated by their order number ‘B4’ and delivered during 1891 and 1892. A further ten locomotives were ordered in 1893 which were delivered in November and December of that year under order D6.

Drummond designed a similar class of five locomotives in 1907, with a slightly smaller boiler and lipped chimney. These were delivered during 1908 under order K14. No. 84, delivered in June 1908 was the last locomotive to be built at Nine Elms Works prior to the works' transfer to Eastleigh. These locomotives were originally regarded as a new class. However, Drummond's successor Robert Urie, considered them to be so similar to the originals, that they were merged with the B4 class in 1912.

Order No.	Year	Quantity	LSWR numbers	Notes
B4	1891	10	85–94	
D6	1893	10	81, 95–100, 102, 103, 176	
K14	1908	5	746, 747, 82–84	746/747 renumbered 101/147 in 1922

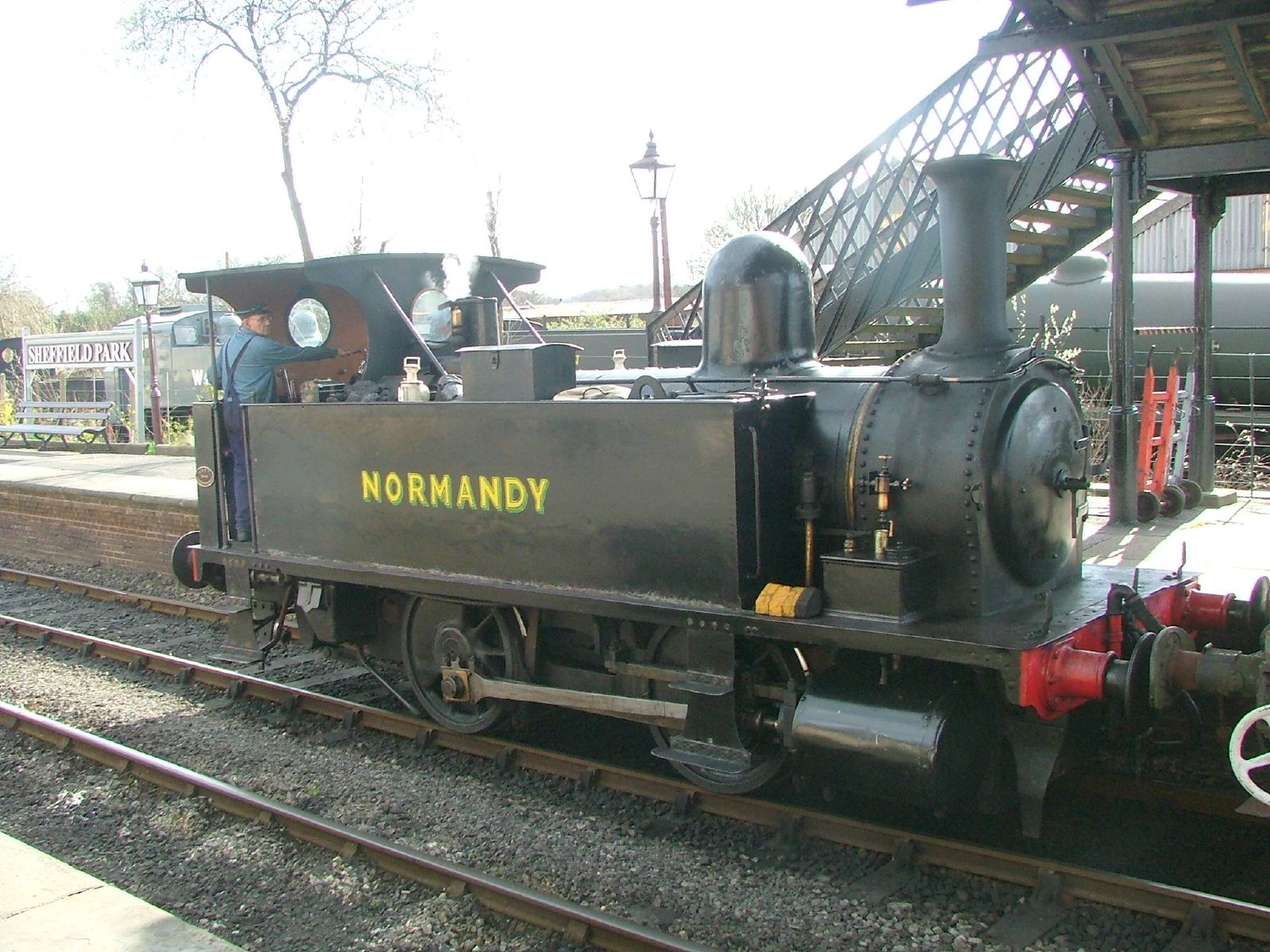
Preserved Normandy, with a cut away cab.

== Service ==
The first ten locomotives were allocated to major stations throughout the system including Eastleigh, Exmouth Junction, Bournemouth and Plymouth Friary (for use on Cattedown Wharfs and the Turnchapel branch). In November 1892 the LSWR purchased the Southampton Docks, and so both new and existing B4s were sent there over the next few years to replace the existing motive power as they became worn out. By 1899 their use as station pilots had ceased except at Exeter and fourteen were working in Southampton Docks. Other members of the class were assigned to various depots around the LSWR system, for yard and dock shunting.

After 1923 the Southern Railway also used them at Dover Marine, Ashford, Stewarts Lane, Hamworthy (for use at Poole Quay) and at Guildford (as a shed pilot). At least two were retained at Eastleigh one of which was used to shunt the cramped goods yard at Winchester City railway station.

== Names ==
The locomotives used by Southampton Docks, were also given names reflecting the destinations of ships then sailing from the port.

LSWR No.	Name
85	Alderney
81	Jersey
86	Havre
89	Trouville
90	Caen
93	St Malo
95	Honfleur
96	Normandy
97	Brittany
98	Cherbourg
102	Granville
176	Guernsey
746	Dinan
747	Dinard

== Withdrawals ==
Following the introduction of the SR USA class to Southampton Docks in 1947, many of the class were made redundant. Withdrawals began under British Railways in May 1948, but others were still in good condition and eleven were sold during 1948/9 for industrial use. Withdrawals resumed in 1957 following the introduction of diesel shunters and by 1961 only three survived. These were withdrawn in 1963.

Table of withdrawals
Year	Quantity in service at start of year	Quantity withdrawn	Locomotive numbers	Notes
1948	25	4	30090–91, 30101/76	30101 and 30176 sold
1949	21	10	30081/85/92/95/97–100, 30103/47	All except 30085 sold
1957	11	2	30082/94	
1958	9	1	30087	
1959	8	4	30083–84/86/88	
1960	4	1	30093	
1963	3	3	30089/96, 30102	30096 and 30102 sold

== Preservation ==
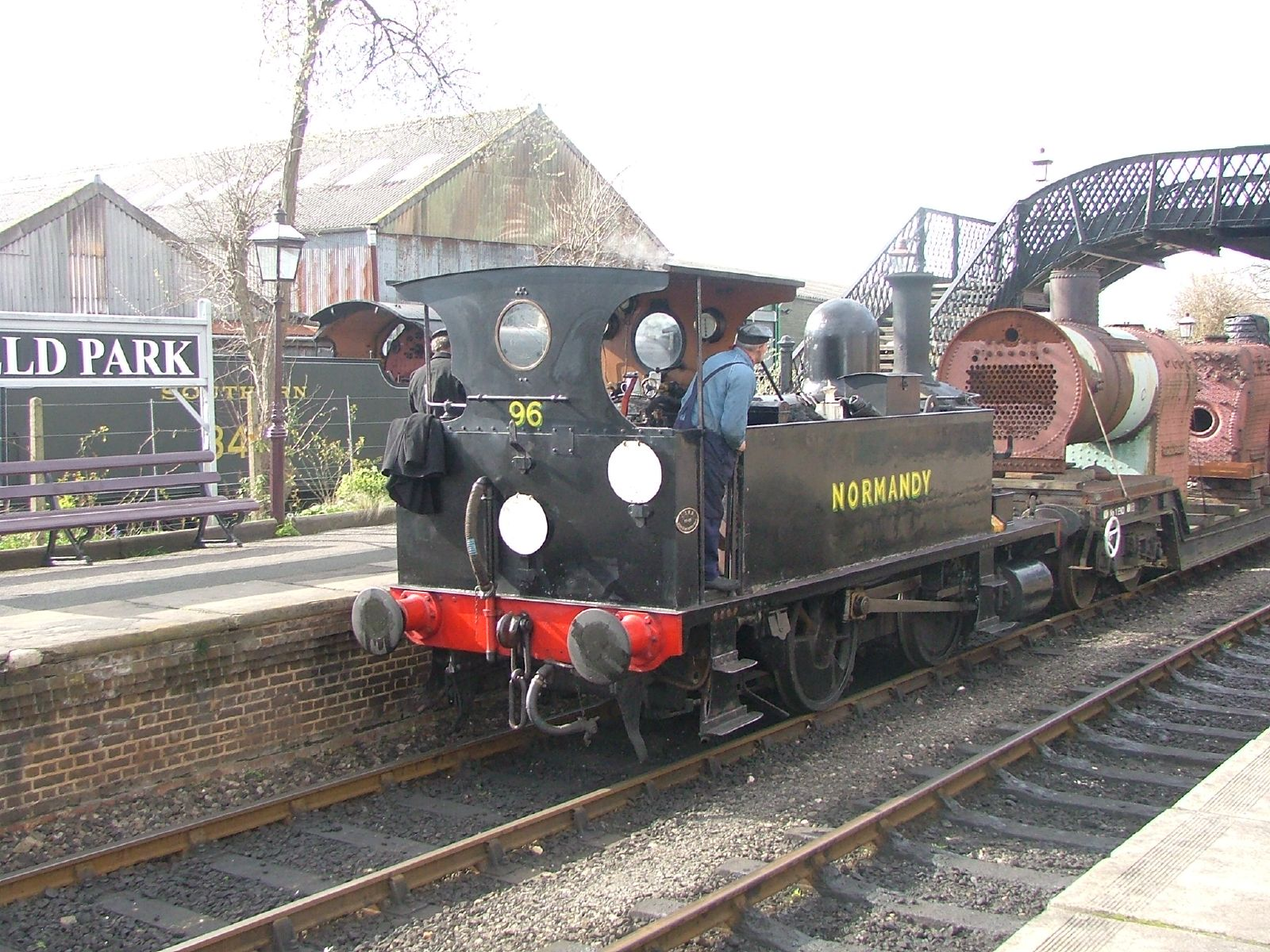
Preserved Normandy on the Bluebell Railway

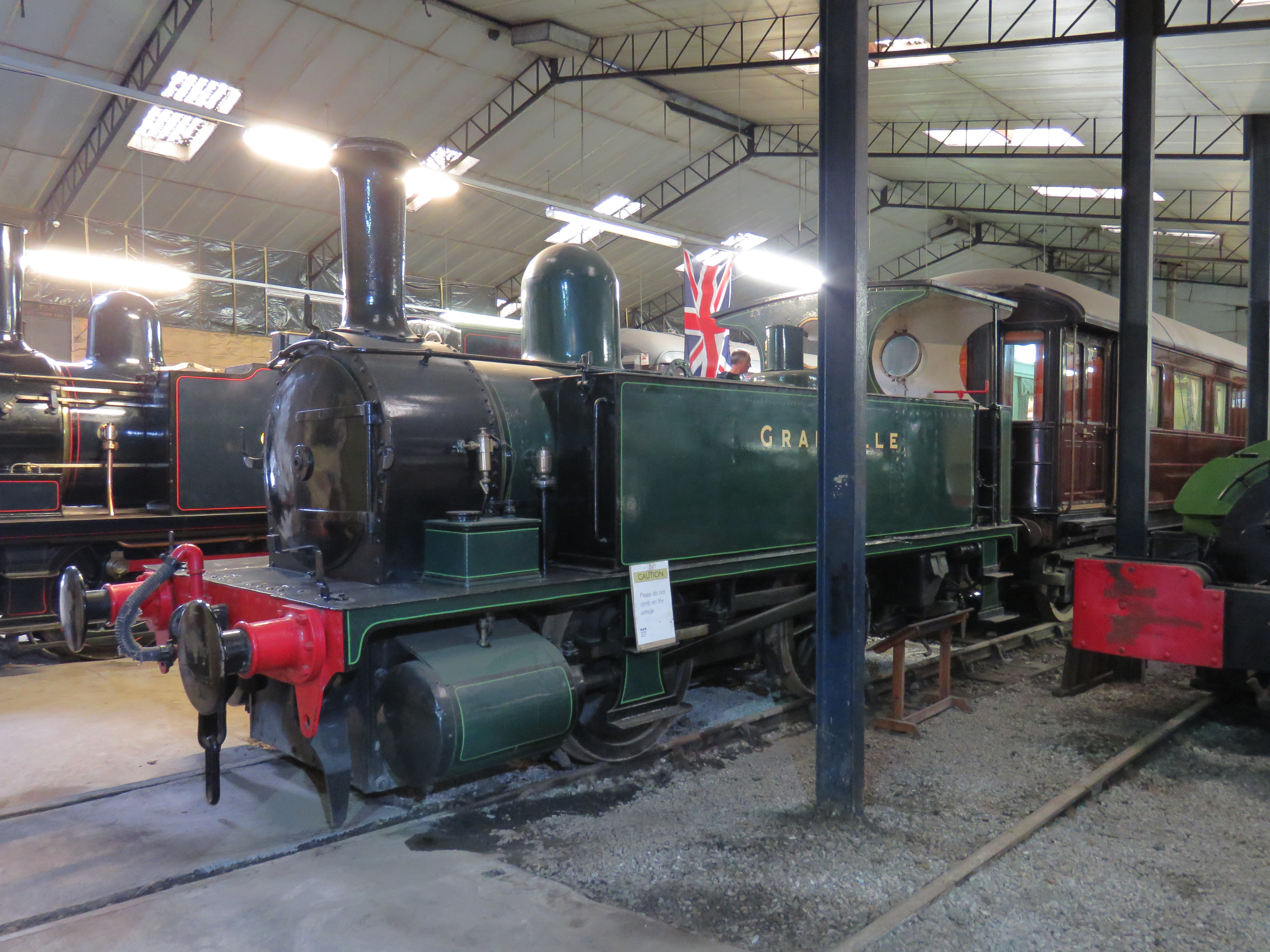
Preserved Granville at Bressingham

Two examples of the class have survived into preservation:

- No. 96 (BR 30096) Normandy was sold to Corrall Limited and used at their Southampton coal depot, where it was named Corrall Queen. It has been preserved on the Bluebell Railway where, in the days before the line had any diesel locomotives, it was often used as a shunter. It is owned by the Bulleid Society and was under overhaul as of 2026.
- No. 102 (BR 30102) Granville was purchased in 1964, after withdrawal from BR, by Butlins and then displayed alongside LMS Royal Scot class 6100 Royal Scot at the firm's Skegness Holiday Camp. In 1971 it was moved to Bressingham Steam Museum near Diss, Norfolk, where it remains on static display.
