= LSWR A12 class =

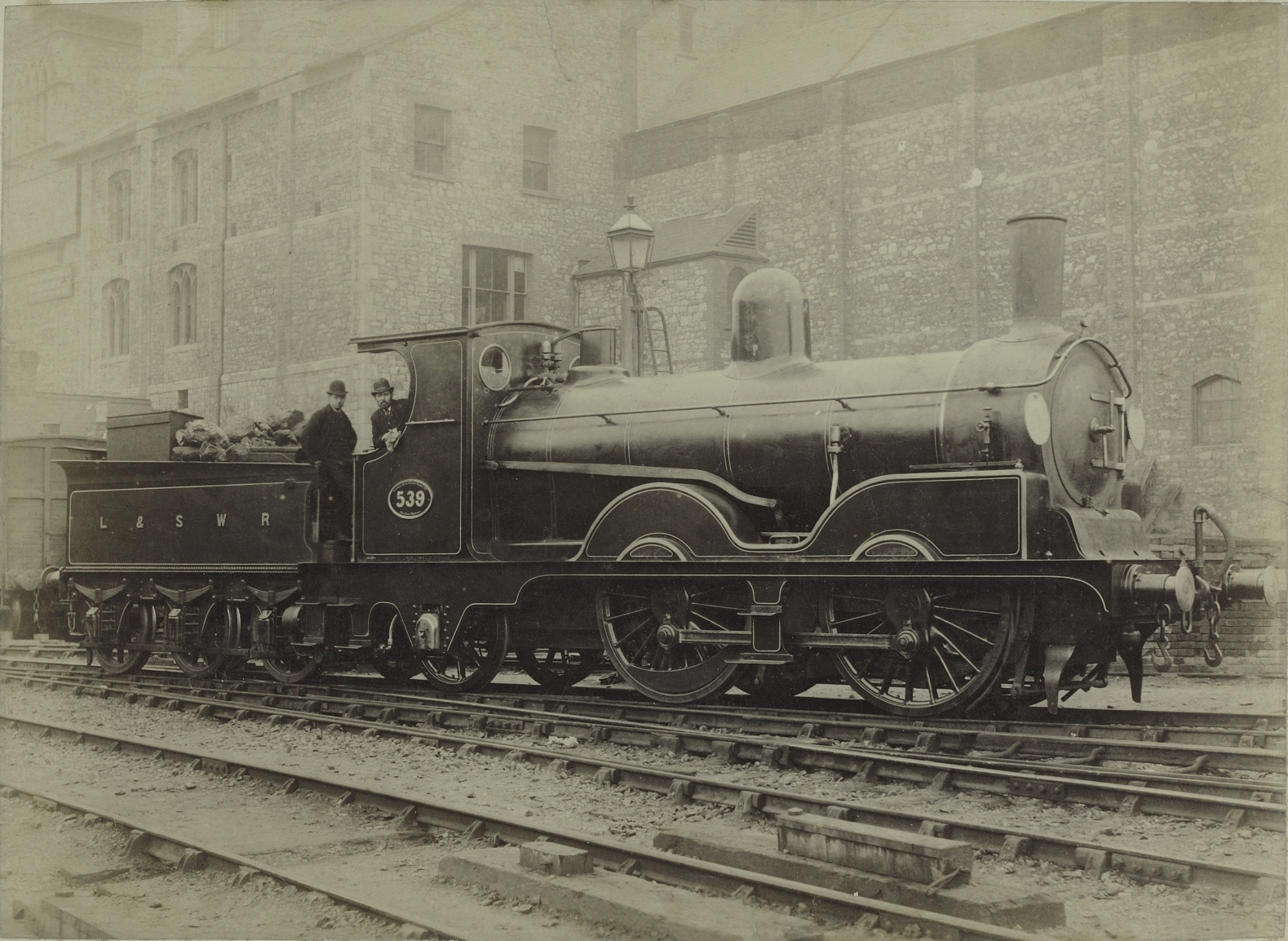
- LSWR A12 class No. 539 in 1888
Type and origin
- Power type: Steam
- Designer: William Adams
- Builder: LSWR Nine Elms Works (50); Neilson & Co. (40)
- Build date: 1887–1894
- Total produced: 90
Specifications
- Configuration
  - Whyte: 0-4-2
  - UIC: B1 n2
- Gauge: 4 ft 8 1/2 in (1,435 mm)
- Driver dia.: 6 ft 1 in (1.854 m)
- Trailing dia.: 4 ft 0 in (1.219 m)
- Boiler pressure: 160 lbf/in^{2} (1.10 MPa)
- Cylinders: Two, inside
- Cylinder size: 18 in × 26 in (457 mm × 660 mm)
Performance figures
- Tractive effort: 15,690 lbf (69.79 kN)
Career
- Operators: London and South Western Railway; Southern Railway; British Railways
- Class: LSWR: A12; SR: A12; BR: 1MT
- Nicknames: Jubilees
- Retired: 1928–1948
- Disposition: All scrapped

The A12 locomotives of the London and South Western Railway were built between the years 1887 and 1895 to the design of William Adams. Ninety of the locomotives were built, fifty at Nine Elms Works and forty by Neilson and Company, although the latter together with the final twenty from Nine Elms were officially known as the O4 class. They were unusual for their time, with a wheel arrangement of 0-4-2. This arrangement was used by few of the other railway companies and never proved popular (although the Great Northern Railway had 150 such locomotives). They bore the nickname "Jubilees", because the first batch appeared in the Golden Jubilee of Queen Victoria's reign.

The class were intended for mixed traffic role. Unlike many other British railways, the LSWR had little heavy freight or mineral traffic. The A12s were designed for a dual role of non-express main line passenger services and fast goods, parcels and perishables traffic. Their size, power and design barred them from the fastest express and mail trains on the LSWR, but made them ideal for heavier, slower passenger trains such as holiday and excursion traffic between London and Bournemouth, Poole and the Dorset coast and military trains between the army camps in London and northern Hampshire and the Channel ports, which were an important traffic for the LSWR. The A12s were well-suited to running goods trains of livestock, fruit and milk, on the West of England line between London and Exeter and parcels and express freight going between London and Southampton docks. The class also found a role working secondary cross-country passenger services west of Salisbury, on the route to Plymouth and on rural lines in Hampshire.

== History ==
The 90 members of the class were built in batches, as shown in the following table.

Year	Order	Builder	Quantity	LSWR numbers	Notes
1887	A12	LSWR Nine Elms	10	527–536	
1888	E1	LSWR Nine Elms	10	537–546	
1889	M2	LSWR Nine Elms	10	547–556	
1893–94	O4	LSWR Nine Elms	10	597–606	
1892–93	—	Neilson & Co. 4506–4545	40	607–646	
1894–95	K6	LSWR Nine Elms	10	647–656	

All 90 passed to the Southern Railway in 1923, following the introduction of the Grouping Act.

== Withdrawal ==
Withdrawals started in 1928, with four of the class surviving to Nationalisation. The four operated by British Railways were all withdrawn in its first year (1948), excluding DS3191 which was used for steam supply at Eastleigh Works and lasted until 1951. No members of the class have been preserved.

Table of withdrawals
Year	Quantity in service at start of year	Quantity withdrawn	Locomotive numbers	Notes
1928	90	6	E529, E535, E542, E548, E552, E553	
1929	84	13	E528, E531–E533, E536, E537, E540, E543, E544, E547, E549, E550, E556	
1930	71	3	E527, E539, E546	
1931	68	6	E530, E534, E538, E541, E545, E554	
1932	62	6	551, 607, 608, 610, 653, 656	
1933	56	9	602, 604, 626, 631, 633, 639, 645, 647, 651	
1934	47	1	601	
1935	46	3	603, 621, 635	
1936	43	4	605, 616, 622, 655	
1937	39	4	611, 619, 632, 640	
1938	35	3	617, 628, 650	
1939	32	1	646	613, 620, 624, 625, 629, 642, 644 withdrawn and then reinstated
1944	31	1	555	
1946	30	12	599, 600, 606, 612, 613, 615, 620, 623, 637, 641, 644, 649	612 transferred to Departmental stock as 3191S, later BR DS3191; scrapped 1951
1947	18	14	597, 598, 609, 614, 624, 625, 630, 634, 638, 642, 643, 648, 652, 654	
1948	4	4	618, 627, 629, 636	
