= LSWR T1 class =

Class of British steam locomotives

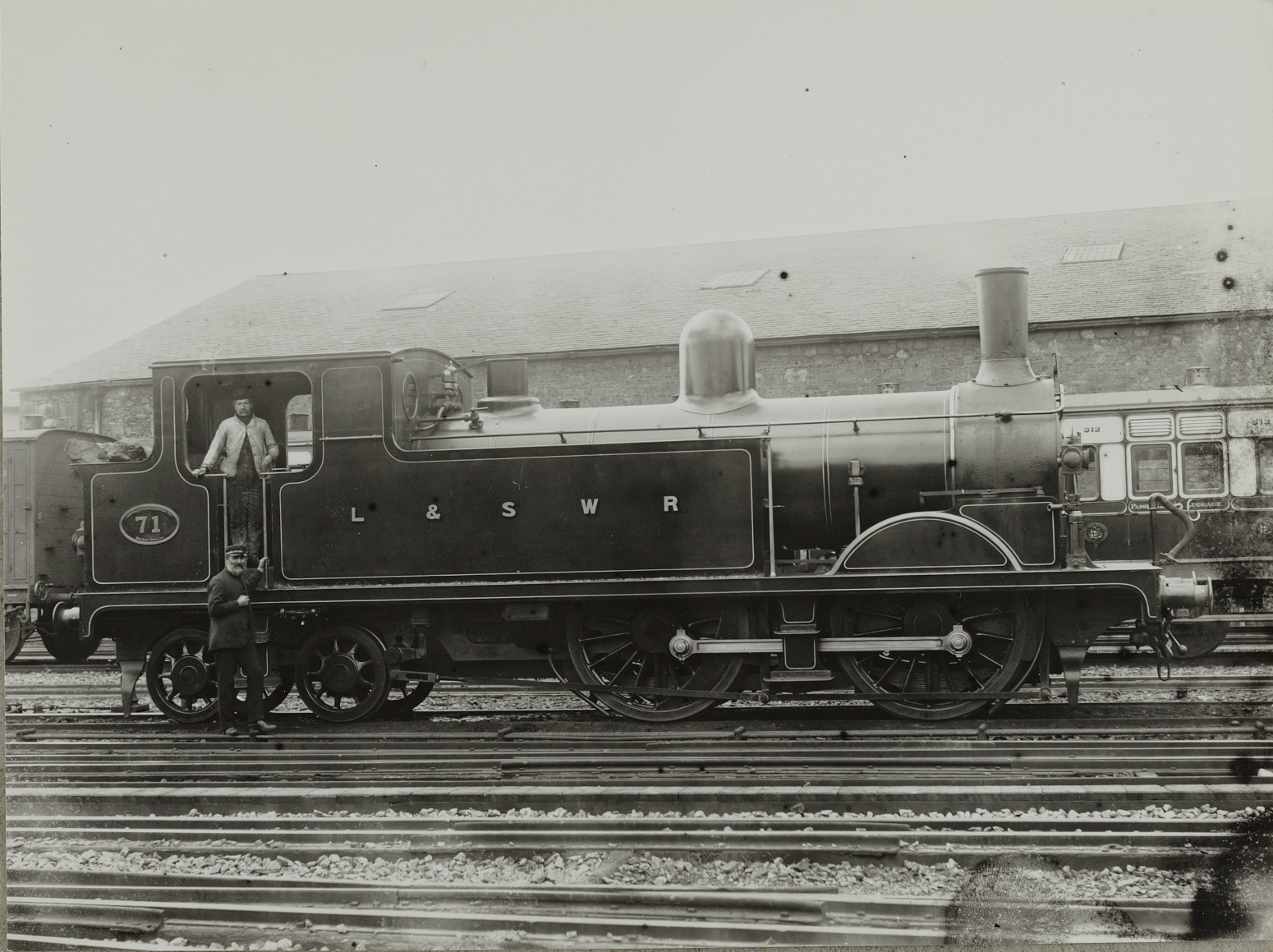
- T1 class No. 71
Type and origin
- Power type: Steam
- Designer: William Adams
- Builder: LSWR Nine Elms Locomotive Works
- Build date: 1888–1896
- Total produced: 50
Specifications
- Configuration
  - Whyte: 0-4-4T
  - UIC: B2'nt
- Gauge: 4 ft 8 1/2 in (1,435 mm)
- Driver dia.: 5 ft 7 in (1.702 m)
- Trailing dia.: 3 ft 0 in (0.914 m)
- Wheelbase: 23 ft 0 in (7.01 m)
- Length: 35 ft 1 1/2 in (10.71 m)
- Axle load: 18.50 long tons (18.80 t)
- Adhesive weight: 35.95 long tons (36.53 t)
- Loco weight: 55.00 long tons (55.88 t)
- Fuel type: Coal
- Fuel capacity: 2.00 long tons (2.03 t)
- Water cap.: 1,200 imperial gallons (5,500 L; 1,400 US gal)
- Boiler pressure: 160 psi (1.10 MPa)
- Cylinders: Two, inside
- Cylinder size: 18 in × 26 in (457 mm × 660 mm)
Performance figures
- Tractive effort: 17,099 lbf (76.1 kN)
Career
- Operators: LSWR · SR · BR
- Class: T1
- Power class: LSWR/SR: K, BR: 1P
- Withdrawn: 1931–1951
- Disposition: All but a single boiler scrapped

The London and South Western Railway T1 class was a class of fifty 0-4-4T steam tank locomotives designed for suburban passenger work by William Adams and built between 1888 and 1896.

== History ==
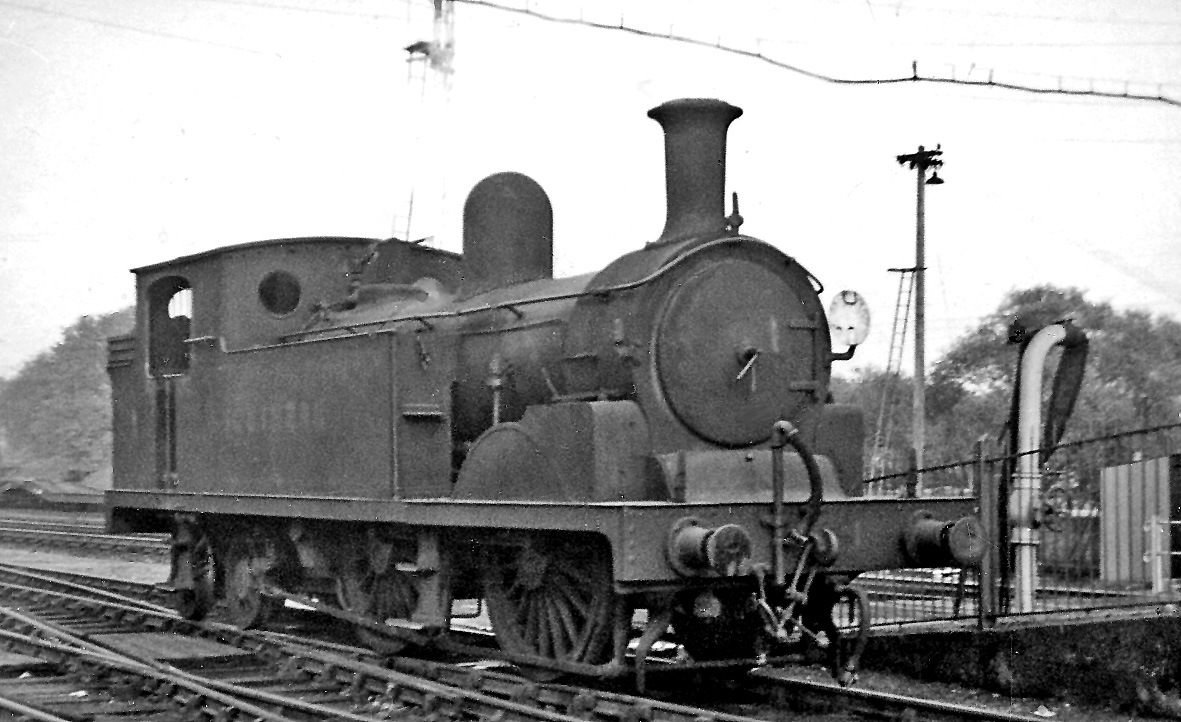
T1 class Nº 1 at Winchester (City) station, October 1947

The class were numbered 1–20, 61–80 and 358–367. In typical London and South Western Railway fashion, they reused the numbers of retired or duplicated engines. The class remained largely intact until the 1930s, being scheduled to be withdrawn by 1940, however due to the Second World War a few remained in traffic (around eight examples) until the early British Railways years, the final one (30007) being withdrawn in May 1951.

Order	Year	Quantity	LSWR numbers	Notes
T1	1888	10	61–70	
D2	1889	10	71–80	
F6	1894	10	1–10	
S6	1895	10	11–20	
A7	1896	10	358–367	

== Possible Revival ==
No complete T1 locomotives were saved for preservation, however, a boiler and smokebox from a withdrawn locomotive was found in a factory in Essex back in the 1980s along with 2 GNR Class C1 (large boiler) boilers and 1 GER Class Y14 boiler and was subsequently purchased for use on a 'new' T1 locomotive. Since September 2004, this boiler has been stored on the Avon Valley Railway.

Table of withdrawals
Year	Quantity in service at start of year	Quantity withdrawn	Locomotive numbers
1931	50	3	67–69
1932	47	3	62, 66, 77
1933	44	8	12, 14, 63, 64, 72, 76, 78, 79
1934	36	3	65, 70, 74
1935	33	2	18, 75
1936	31	3	71, 73, 80
1937	28	1	19
1938	27	1	365
1939	26	1	362
1943	25	1	359
1944	24	5	11, 15, 358, 360, 364
1945	19	1	17
1946	18	2	4, 16
1947	16	1	6
1948	15	5	30003, 30009, 30010, 30363, 30366
1949	10	5	30001, 30002, 30008, 30013, 30361
1950	5	1	30005
1951	4	4	30007, 30020, 30061, 30367
