= LSWR 46 class =

Class of 4-4-0 passenger tank locomotive

LSWR/SR 46 Class
Type and origin
- Power type: Steam
- Designer: William Adams
- Builder: Beyer, Peacock & Co.
- Serial number: 1832–1843
- Build date: 1879
- Total produced: 12
Specifications
- Configuration
  - Whyte: Built as 4-4-0T; rebuilt to 4-4-2T
  - UIC: 2′B n2t, later 2′B1 n2t
- Gauge: 4 ft 8 1/2 in (1,435 mm)
- Leading dia.: 2 ft 6 in (0.762 m)
- Driver dia.: 5 ft 7 in (1.702 m)
- Trailing dia.: 3 ft 0 in (0.914 m)
- Length: 36 ft 5 1/2 in (11.11 m)
- Loco weight: 58.95 long tons (59.90 t)
- Fuel type: Coal
- Fuel capacity: 3 long tons (3.0 t)
- Water cap.: 1,650 imp gal (7,500 L; 1,980 US gal)
- Boiler pressure: 140 psi (0.97 MPa)
- Cylinders: Two, outside
- Cylinder size: 18 in × 24 in (457 mm × 610 mm)
Performance figures
- Tractive effort: 13,810 lbf (61.4 kN)
Career
- Operators: LSWR · SR
- Class: 46, later 046
- Power class: K
- Number in class: 1 January 1923: 7
- Withdrawn: 1914–1925
- Disposition: All scrapped

The LSWR 46 Class was a class of 4-4-0 passenger tank locomotive designed by William Adams for the London and South Western Railway. Later rebuilt to 4-4-2T, no examples have been preserved.

== Background ==
The first design by William Adams, the 46 class represents an interim design to supplement the Beattie Well Tanks that were already in service. All were built in 1879 and were intended for light suburban passenger traffic around London and the South Coast on the LSWR network. This was the second (and final) 4-4-0T design on the LSWR, but the first specifically intended for the London suburban services - the LSWR 318 class of 1875 were for the routes west of Exeter and transferred to London from 1876. The 46 class were later rostered on local passenger services under the ownership of the Southern Railway in 1923, though all were withdrawn and scrapped by 1925.

== Construction history ==
The 46 class was designed when the LSWR needed to have a range of newer, more reliable locomotives for use on their network. As a result, Adams intended them to be an immediate stop-gap measure that could be utilised on suburban passenger services while he devised a better solution to the railway's motive power problem. This solution would eventually prove to be the 415 class of 4-4-2T locomotive.

The construction of the class was contracted to outside builders to speed up construction and delivery. The contractor selected was Beyer, Peacock and Company, which manufactured 12 4-4-0 tank locomotives in 1879. After only four years in service, the entire class was converted to the 4-4-2 'radial' tank design between 1883 and 1886, following the successful introduction of the 415 class in 1882 on London's suburban network.

The conversion was done for standardisation, as various parts could be exchanged between both classes and in consequence the only obvious difference between them, apart from the large side tanks on the 46 class, was the positioning of the safety valves on the boiler. However, the conversion resulted in a heavier locomotive, as the water capacity was increased and coal bunker enlarged to enable longer journeys between refueling. This resulted in the locomotives' frames being extended, giving a greater length than the original 4-4-0 design.

== Livery and numbering ==
=== LSWR ===
After a period in the LSWR's early Yellow Ochre/Brown passenger livery, the 46 class was outshopped in LSWR Passenger Sage Green livery, with black edging and black and white lining. Numbering was in gilt, as was the 'LSWR' lettering on the water tank side.

Under the LSWR numbering policy, the number of the first locomotive of a new design became the number of the class. Since the first locomotive was numbered 46, the class was thus regarded as such. The other members were numbered 123, 124, 130, 132, 133 and 374–379.

LSWR numbering policy was very unusual because the railway did not allocate a numerical series to a new class of locomotive. This resulted in many different classes of locomotives being numbered and mixed within series.

From 1903 to 1905, the locomotives were re-numbered according to the LSWR's duplicate numbering system. This meant that a '0' prefix was added to the LSWR numbers, and that the doyen of the class, number 46 became 046.

=== Southern ===
Nine of the locomotives were inherited by the Southern Railway at the beginning of 1923; two were withdrawn later that year, five more in 1924 and the last two in 1925. The two in question, Nos. 0375 and 0377, had been used on the Swanage branch.

== Operational details ==
Despite its long period of service, the 46 class was regarded as a stop-gap measure to assist the smooth operation of LSWR passenger services. This belief continued despite the addition of a trailing axle in 1883 onward for standardisation purposes. The class was eventually demoted to local rural passenger services by the LSWR, along with their 415 class successors. One locomotive, number (0)376, was withdrawn early in February 1914, though was sold to the Brecon and Merthyr Railway in South Wales. There it was re-numbered 44, passing to the Great Western Railway on 1 July 1922 who allocated it number 1391. However it was withdrawn later that year before the number was applied.

The class's withdrawal briefly stopped with the start of the First World War, where motive power shortages effectively extended their working lives until they became surplus to requirements after the war's end. As a result, four of the class were withdrawn in November 1921, with the remaining seven making it to grouping and Southern Railway ownership in 1923. The withdrawals continued, with the final serviceable example being withdrawn in October 1925.

Table of withdrawals
Year	Quantity in service at start of year	Quantity withdrawn	Locomotive numbers	Notes
1914	12	1	0376	Sold to B&MR 44
1921	11	4	0123, 0124, 0133, 0379	
1923	7	1	0378	
1924	6	4	046, 0130, 0132, 0374	
1925	2	2	0375, 0377	
