= LSWR 445 class =

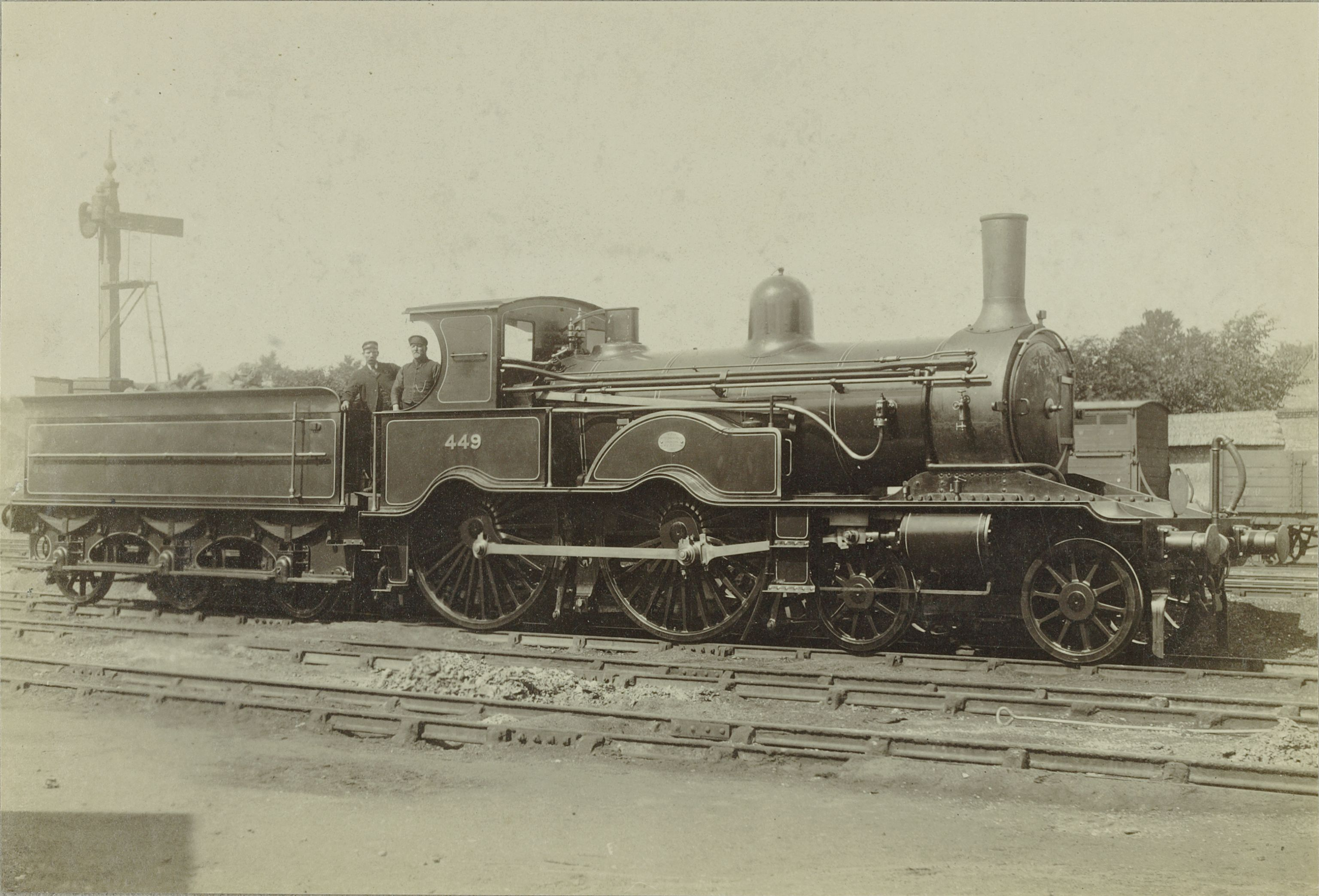
Type and origin
- Power type: Steam
- Designer: William Adams
- Builder: Robert Stephenson & Co.
- Serial number: 2535–2546
- Build date: 1883
- Total produced: 12
Specifications
- Configuration
  - Whyte: 4-4-0
  - UIC: 2'Bn
- Gauge: 4 ft 8 1/2 in (1,435 mm)
- Leading dia.: 3 ft 7 in (1.092 m)
- Driver dia.: 7 ft 1 in (2.159 m)
- Length: 51 ft 11 3/8 in (15.83 m)
- Height: 13 ft 2 3/4 in (4.03 m)
- Axle load: 15.00 long tons (15.24 t)
- Adhesive weight: 29.75 long tons (30.23 t)
- Loco weight: 46.05 long tons (46.79 t)
- Tender weight: 32.25 long tons (32.77 t)
- Fuel type: Coal
- Water cap.: 2,800 imp gal (13,000 L; 3,400 US gal)
- Boiler pressure: 160 psi (1.10 MPa)
- Cylinders: Two, outside
- Cylinder size: 18 in × 24 in (457 mm × 610 mm)
Performance figures
- Tractive effort: 12,442 lbf (55.3 kN)
Career
- Operators: LSWR · SR
- Class: 445
- Power class: SR: K
- Withdrawn: 1923–1925
- Disposition: All scrapped

The LSWR 445 class was a class of express passenger 4-4-0 steam locomotives designed for the London and South Western Railway by William Adams. Twelve were constructed by Robert Stephenson and Company in 1883.

The class were numbered 445–456, and were an enlarged version of the 135 class.

Table of locomotive orders
| Year | Builder | Quantity | LSWR Numbers | Notes |
|---|---|---|---|---|
| 1883 | Robert Stephenson & Co. 2535–2546 | 12 | 445–456 | |

All were renumbered in to the duplicate list as 0445–0456 between 1908 and 1911.

All passed to the Southern Railway at the grouping in 1923. Withdrawals started that year, with four being retired in 1924 and the last seven withdrawn and scrapped in 1925.
