= LSWR X2 class =

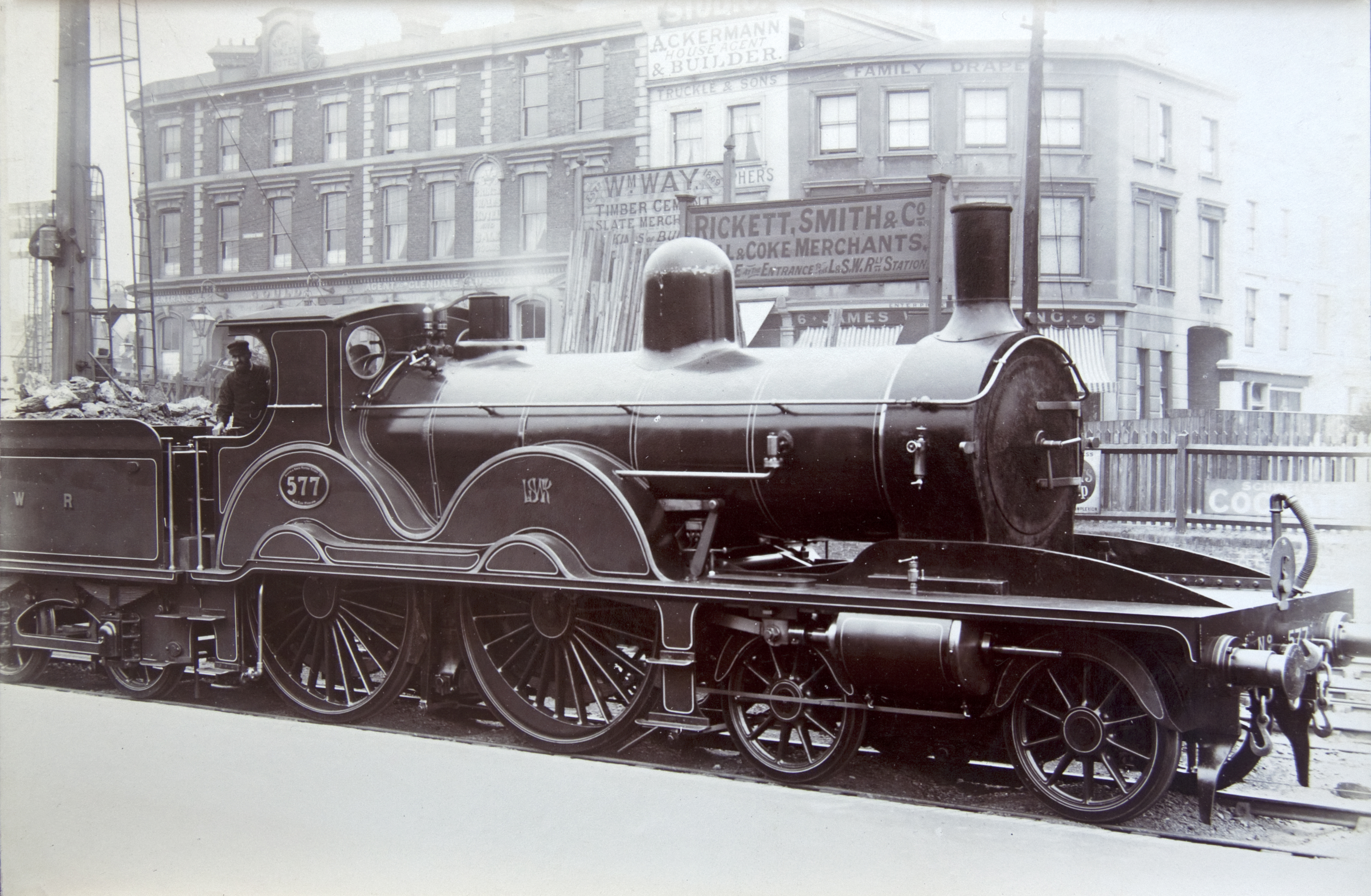
- LSWR X2 class locomotive no. 577
Type and origin
- Power type: Steam
- Designer: William Adams
- Builder: LSWR Nine Elms Works
- Build date: 1890–1892
- Total produced: 20
Specifications
- Configuration
  - Whyte: 4-4-0
  - UIC: 2′B n2
- Gauge: 4 ft 8 1/2 in (1,435 mm)
- Leading dia.: 3 ft 9 3/4 in (1.162 m)
- Driver dia.: 7 ft 1 in (2.159 m)
- Length: 53 ft 8 3/8 in (16.37 m)
- Height: 13 ft 2 3/4 in (4.03 m)
- Axle load: 15.45 long tons (15.70 t)
- Adhesive weight: 30.30 long tons (30.79 t)
- Loco weight: 48.675 long tons (49.456 t)
- Tender weight: 36.20 long tons (36.78 t)
- Fuel type: Coal
- Fuel capacity: 3.00 long tons (3.05 t)
- Water cap.: 3,300 imp gal (15,000 L; 4,000 US gal)
- Boiler pressure: 175 psi (1.21 MPa)
- Cylinders: Two, outside
- Cylinder size: 19 in × 26 in (483 mm × 660 mm)
Performance figures
- Tractive effort: 16,426 lbf (73.1 kN)
Career
- Operators: LSWR · Southern Railway
- Class: X2
- Power class: SR: I
- Withdrawn: 1930–1942
- Disposition: All scrapped

The LSWR X2 class was a class of express passenger 4-4-0 steam locomotives designed for the London and South Western Railway by William Adams. Twenty were constructed at Nine Elms Locomotive Works between 1890 and 1892.

The class were numbered 577–596, and were an enlarged version of the 460 class. Adams had designed his 7-foot-1-inch (2.159 m) drivered locomotives for the London to Bournemouth route, while the 6-foot-7-inch (2.007 m) drivered locomotives were intended for the London to Salisbury route which had more severe gradients.

Table of locomotive orders
Year	Order	Quantity	LSWR Numbers	Notes
1890	X2	10	577–586	
1891	F3	10	587–596	

All passed to the Southern Railway at the grouping in 1923. Withdrawals started in 1930, and by the end of 1933, only four remained. No. 592 went in 1936, numbers 587 and 590 were retired during 1937, leaving only No. 586, which was withdrawn in November 1942. All were scrapped.

Table of withdrawals
Year	Quantity in service at start of year	Quantity withdrawn	Locomotive numbers
1930	20	1	595
1931	19	8	582, 583, 585, 589, 591, 593, 594, 596
1932	11	3	579, 581, 588
1933	8	4	577, 578, 580, 584
1936	4	1	592
1937	3	2	587, 590
1942	1	1	586
