= LSWR 460 class =

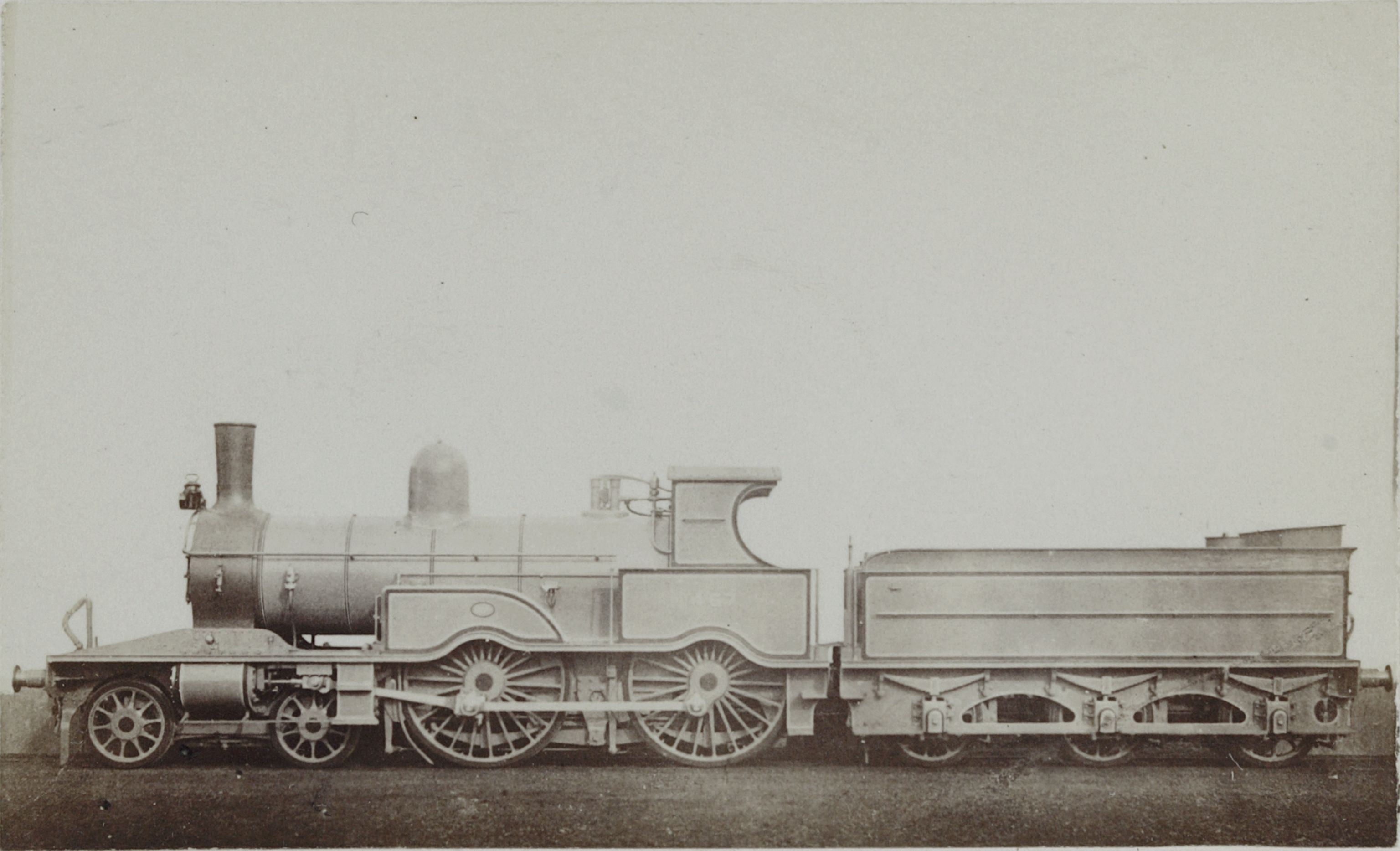
Type and origin
- Power type: Steam
- Designer: William Adams
- Builder: Neilson & Co. (10), Robert Stephenson & Co. (11)
- Serial number: Neilson 3190–3199, RS 2561–2570, 2650
- Build date: 1884 (20), 1887 (1)
- Total produced: 21
Specifications
- Configuration
  - Whyte: 4-4-0
  - UIC: 2′B n2
- Gauge: 4 ft 8 1/2 in (1,435 mm)
- Leading dia.: 3 ft 4 in (1.016 m)
- Driver dia.: 6 ft 7 in (2.007 m)
- Length: 51 ft 11 3/8 in (15.83 m)
- Height: 13 ft 2 3/4 in (4.03 m)
- Axle load: 15.25 long tons (15.49 t)
- Adhesive weight: 29.80 long tons (30.28 t)
- Loco weight: 45.75 long tons (46.48 t)
- Tender weight: 28.90 long tons (29.36 t)
- Fuel type: Coal
- Water cap.: 2,350 imp gal (10,700 L; 2,820 US gal)
- Boiler pressure: 160 psi (1.10 MPa)
- Cylinders: Two, outside
- Cylinder size: 18 in × 24 in (457 mm × 610 mm)
Performance figures
- Tractive effort: 13,387 lbf (59.5 kN)
Career
- Operators: LSWR · SR
- Class: 460
- Power class: SR: K
- Withdrawn: 1924–1929
- Disposition: All scrapped

The LSWR 460 class was a class of express passenger 4-4-0 steam locomotives designed for the London and South Western Railway by William Adams. Twenty were constructed by Neilson and Company and Robert Stephenson and Company in 1884 and one in 1887.

Adams had originally ordered ten locomotives from each manufacturer in 1884. In 1887, Robert Stephenson and Company built an additional locomotive for display at a Jubilee exhibition in Newcastle upon Tyne, after which it was sold to the LSWR. The class were numbered 147, 460–478 and 526, and were a small-wheeled version of the 445 class.

Table of locomotive orders
Year	Builder	Quantity	LSWR Numbers	Notes
1884	Neilson & Co. 3190–3199	10	460–469	
1884	Robert Stephenson & Co. 2561–2570	10	147, 470–478	
1887	Robert Stephenson & Co. 2650	1	526	Former exhibition locomotive

All except 526 were renumbered into the duplicate list as 0147, 0460–0478 between 1908 and 1924.

All passed to the Southern Railway at the grouping in 1923. Withdrawals started the following year with the last two, 467 and 470 being withdrawn and scrapped in 1929.

Table of withdrawals
Year	Quantity in service at start of year	Quantity withdrawn	Locomotive numbers	Notes
1924	21	1	E0465	
1926	20	5	E0461, E462A, E0463, E475A, E0476	
1927	15	5	E0147, E464A, E0469, E0472, E0477	
1928	10	7	E0466, E0468, E0471, E473A, E0474, E0478, E526	
1929	3	3	E0460, E0467, E0470	
