= Massey Bromley =

British locomotive engineer

- Born: 15 June 1846; Wolverhampton
- Died: 16 July 1884 (aged 38); Penistone
- Engineering career
- Discipline: Mechanical, Locomotive
- Employer: Great Eastern Railway

Massey Bromley (1846-1884) was the English Chief Mechanical Engineer of the Great Eastern Railway in 1878–81. During that brief period he established the Stratford Works in East London as the place where most of the Great Eastern's locomotives were built. Bromley was killed in the Penistone rail crash of 1884.

== Sources ==
- LNER Encyclopedia (see below)

Business positions
Preceded by William Adams	Locomotive Superintendent; Great Eastern Railway; 1878–1881	Succeeded by Thomas William Worsdell
