= William Adams (locomotive engineer) =

English railway engineer

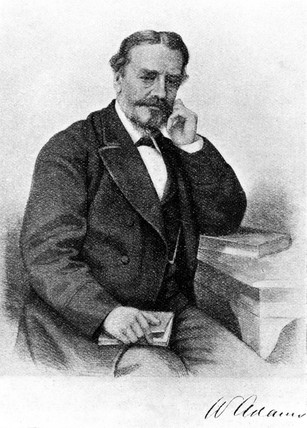
- from The Locomotive magazine, 1911
- Born: 15 October 1823; Limehouse, London, England
- Died: 7 August 1904 (aged 80); Putney, London, England
- Engineering career
- Discipline: Mechanical, locomotive
- Employer(s): North London Railway; Great Eastern Railway; London and South Western Railway

William Adams (15 October 1823 – 7 August 1904) was an English railway engineer. He was the Locomotive Superintendent of the North London Railway from 1858 to 1873; the Great Eastern Railway from 1873 until 1878 and the London and South Western Railway from then until his retirement in 1895. He is best known for his locomotives featuring the Adams bogie, a device with lateral centring springs (initially made of rubber) to improve high-speed stability. He should not be mistaken for William Bridges Adams (1797–1872) a locomotive engineer who, confusingly, invented the Adams axle – a radial axle that William Adams incorporated in designs for the London and South Western Railway.

== History ==
Adams was born on 15 October 1823 in Mill Place, Limehouse, London, where his father was resident engineer of the nearby East and West India Dock Company. After private schooling in Margate, Kent he was apprenticed to his father's works. The railway surveyor Charles Vignoles had previously worked on the construction of the London dock basins and this association then secured a position for Adams as an assistant in his drawing office. The final years of apprenticeship were spent at the Orchard Wharf works of Miller & Ravenhill, builders of engines for steamships.

In 1848 Adams became assistant works manager for Philip Taylor, an ironfounder, millwright and former assistant to Marc Brunel, who had formed Taylor & Prandi, a partnership to build and install marine engines from workshops in Marseille and Genoa. Fluent in French and Italian, Adams soon found himself effectively a superintendent engineer for the Royal Sardinian Navy, with the standing of a government official. (The Kingdom of Sardinia then encompassed Genoa and much of what is now north-west Italy.) In 1852 he married Isabella Park, the daughter of another English millwright working in Genoa. When Taylor and Prandi failed through debt in 1852, Adams returned to England.

On his return to England Adams initially worked as a surveyor: considering possible routes for a railway on the Isle of Wight, overseeing construction work at Cardiff Docks and planning and equipping new workshops at Bow for the East and West India Docks and Birmingham Junction Railway, soon to change its name to the North London Railway. This led to his appointment as the company's locomotive engineer in 1854, a post he held for eighteen years. Here he introduced his noted series of 4-4-0 tank engines, the first to use the laterally-sprung bogie, and the first continuous train brake.

In 1873 Adams took up a similar position with the nearby Great Eastern Railway (GER). There he did not well appreciate the different requirements of the line, a far-flung concern compared with the North London, and his locomotive designs for the company were found to be underpowered for main-line work. However his refitting of the company's Stratford works using modern, standardised equipment saved a great deal of money and, when he left for the London and South Western Railway in 1878, his reputation was intact.

Adams produced five locomotive designs for the GER, including two sizes of suburban passenger tank engine, an express passenger class, and a design for heavy coal traffic. This last, the 527 class, was the first 2-6-0 to be built for service in Britain, although they did not enter service until his successor Massey Bromley had taken office and incorporated some modifications to the design. He also designed the highly successful 1 class 4-4-2T for the London Tilbury and Southend Railway, most of which gave more than fifty years service.

On the LSWR he designed 524 locomotives, supervised the expansion of Nine Elms Works and the transfer of the Carriage and Wagon Works to Eastleigh. Failing health forced his retirement on 29 May 1895 whilst living in Carlton House on Putney Hill. He lived elsewhere in Putney until his death on 7 August 1904. Five of Adams's locomotives survived into preservation; two 'B4's, one 'O2', one 'T3' and one '415' radial tank. As of October 2023, two were in full working order and operational; O2 No. 24 "Calbourne" of 1891 on the Isle of Wight Steam Railway, and T3 No. 563 of 1893 on the Swanage Railway.

== Locomotives ==
=== North London ===
- see: Locomotives of the North London Railway

=== Great Eastern ===
- 61 class 0-4-4T
- 265 class 4-4-0
- K9 class 0-4-2T
- 230 class 0-4-0T
- 527 class 2-6-0

=== LT&SR ===
- 1 class 4-4-2T

=== LSWR ===
- 380 class 4-4-0
- 135 class 4-4-0
- 395 class 0-6-0
- 46 class 4-4-0T (later rebuilt as 4-4-2T)
- 415 class 4-4-2T "Radial tanks" (noted for their long service on the Lyme Regis branch line).
- 445 class 4-4-0
- 460 class 4-4-0
- A12 class 0-4-2 "Jubilees"
- T1 class 0-4-4T
- O2 class 0-4-4T (noted for their long service on the Isle of Wight).
- X2 class 4-4-0
- T3 class 4-4-0
- B4 class 0-4-0T "Dock tanks"
- G6 class 0-6-0T
- T6 class 4-4-0
- X6 class 4-4-0

Business positions
First	Locomotive Superintendent of the North London Railway; 1853–1873	Succeeded by John C. Park
Preceded by Samuel Waite Johnson	Locomotive Superintendent of the Great Eastern Railway; 1873–1878	Succeeded by Massey Bromley
Preceded by William George Beattie	Locomotive Superintendent of the London and South Western Railway; 1878–1895	Succeeded by Dugald Drummond
