= LSWR T3 class =

British steam locomotive

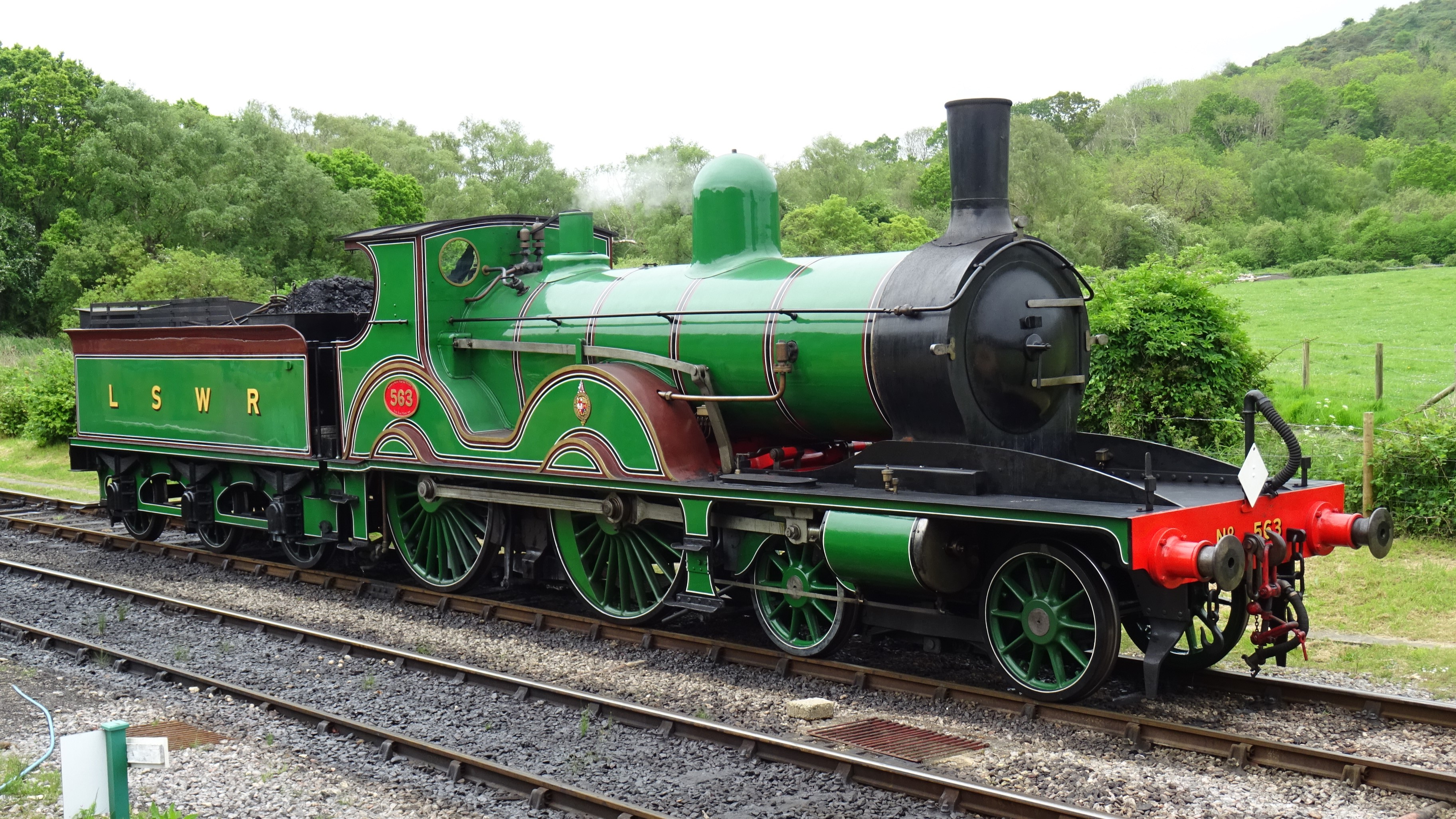
- T3 class 4-4-0 No. 563 at Norden Station on the Swanage Railway.
Type and origin
- Power type: Steam
- Designer: William Adams
- Builder: LSWR Nine Elms Works
- Build date: 1892–1893
- Total produced: 20
Specifications
- Configuration
  - Whyte: 4-4-0
  - UIC: 2'Bn
- Gauge: 4 ft 8 1/2 in (1,435 mm)
- Leading dia.: 3 ft 7 in (1.092 m)
- Driver dia.: 6 ft 7 in (2.007 m)
- Length: 54 ft 2 3/8 in (16.52 m)
- Height: 13 ft 2 3/4 in (4.03 m)
- Axle load: 15.725 long tons (16.0 t)
- Adhesive weight: 35.525 long tons (36.1 t)
- Loco weight: 48.55 long tons (49.3 t)
- Tender weight: 36.2 long tons (36.8 t)
- Fuel type: Coal
- Fuel capacity: 3.00 long tons (3.05 t)
- Water cap.: 3,300 imp gal (15,000 L; 4,000 US gal)
- Boiler pressure: 175 psi (1.21 MPa)
- Cylinders: Two, outside
- Cylinder size: 19 in × 26 in (483 mm × 660 mm)
Performance figures
- Tractive effort: 17,673 lbf (78.6 kN)
Career
- Operators: LSWR · SR
- Class: T3
- Power class: SR: I
- Withdrawn: 1930-1936, 1943–1945
- Disposition: One preserved, remainder scrapped

The LSWR T3 class is a class of express passenger 4-4-0 steam locomotives designed for the London and South Western Railway by William Adams. Twenty were constructed between 1892 and 1893. One, No. 563, has been preserved and restored to full working order.

The class were numbered 557–576, and had been intended as a variant of the X2 class with slightly smaller driving wheels (6 ft 7 in or 2.007 m versus 7 ft 1 in or 2.159 m). In reality, the coupled wheelbase was lengthened by 6 inches (150 mm) and the locomotive was fitted with a deep firebox 6 feet 10 inches (2.08 m) long – the largest firebox of any of Adams' designs - with a 19 3/4 ft^{2} (1.83 m^{2}) grate area.

Table of locomotive orders
| Year | Order | Quantity | LSWR Numbers | Notes |
|---|---|---|---|---|
| 1892 | T3 | 10 | 557–566 | |
| 1893 | S5 | 10 | 567–576 | |

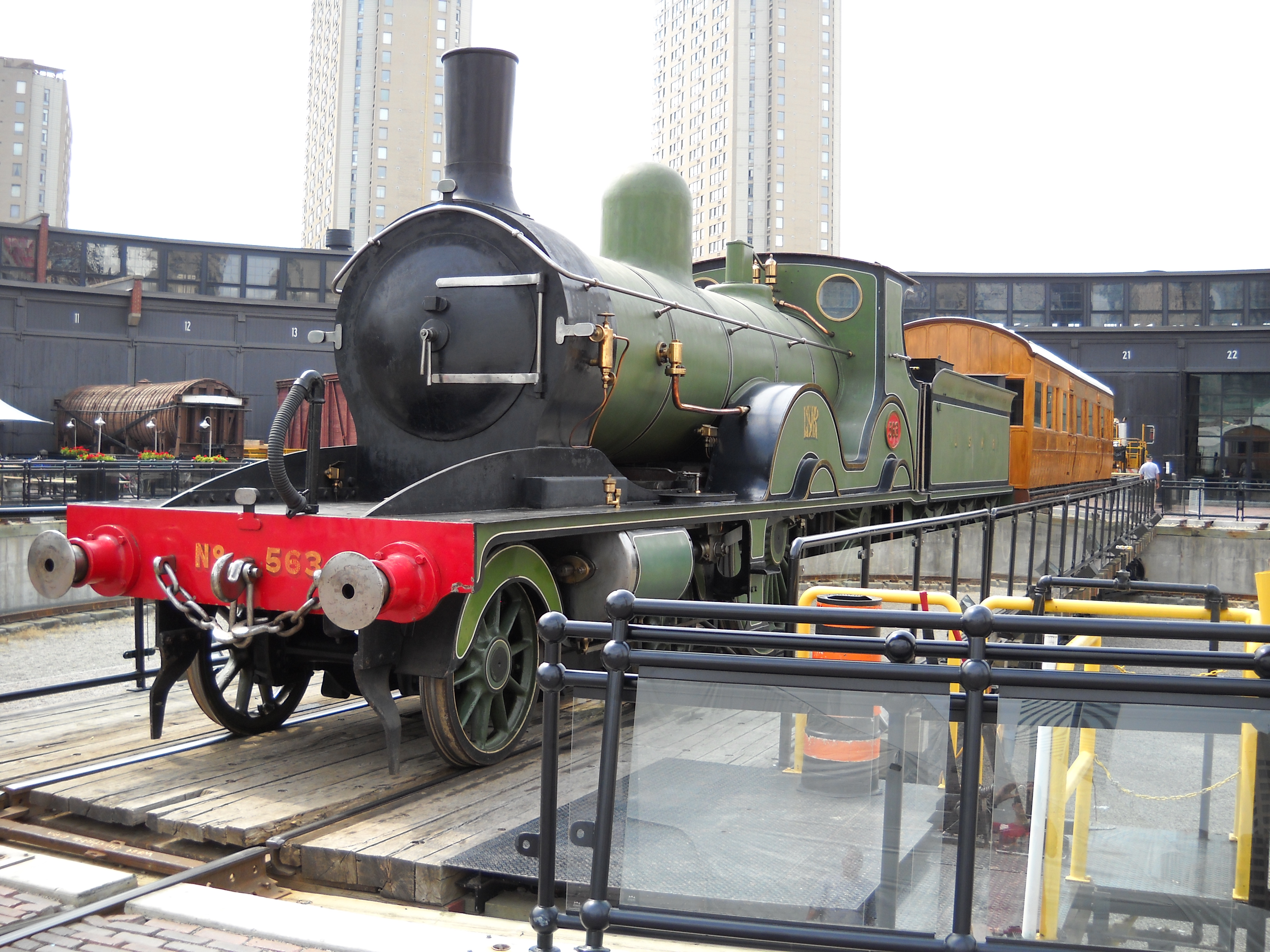
LSWR T3 Class 4-4-0 No. 563 at John Street Roundhouse in Toronto, Canada as part of The Railway Children Theatrical Production in August 2011.

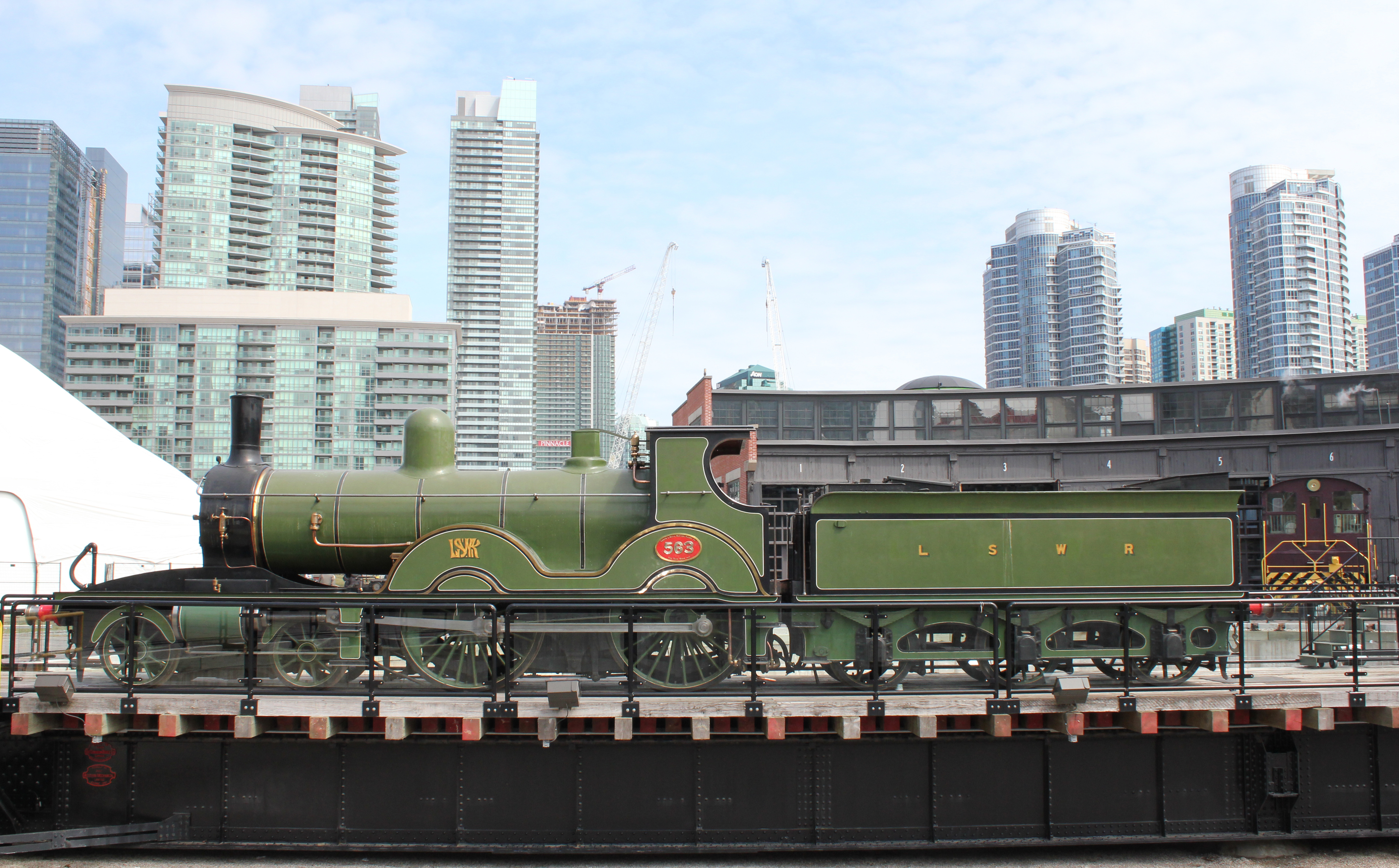
A side view of the same locomotive at the same location as part of the same production on the same date.

All passed to the Southern Railway at the grouping in 1923. Withdrawals started in 1930, and by the end of 1933 only three remained. No. 557 went in 1936, 571 in 1943, and the last, 563 was retired in August 1945 and set aside for preservation, at which point it had run 1,500,000 mi (2,400,000 km). From May to October 2011 it was in Toronto, Ontario, on loan for use in a theatrical production of The Railway Children at Roundhouse Park, a role it reprised from December 2014 to January 2017 when the production was staged at King's Cross, London.

On 30 March 2017, No. 563 was transferred to the Swanage Railway Trust. The locomotive has now moved permanently to the Swanage Railway with a formal handover ceremony held at Corfe Castle on Saturday 27 May. Following an individual donation, the Swanage Railway declared their intention to explore the possibility of restoring the locomotive to working order, with a public appeal for additional funds being launched in October 2017. The evaluation was positive and a full restoration programme was begun, with a target of returning to operation in 2023. 563 returned to full public service on 8 October 2023 after a launch ceremony and supporters' special trains the previous day.

Table of withdrawals
| Year | Quantity in service at start of year | Quantity withdrawn | Locomotive numbers | Notes |
|---|---|---|---|---|
| 1930 | 20 | 1 | E561 | |
| 1931 | 19 | 8 | 558, 559, 562, 564, 566, 570, 572, 573 | |
| 1932 | 11 | 4 | 560, 568, 569, 575 | |
| 1933 | 7 | 4 | 565, 567, 574, 576 | |
| 1936 | 3 | 1 | 557 | |
| 1943 | 2 | 1 | 571 | |
| 1945 | 1 | 1 | 563 | 563 preserved |
