= LSWR 135 class =

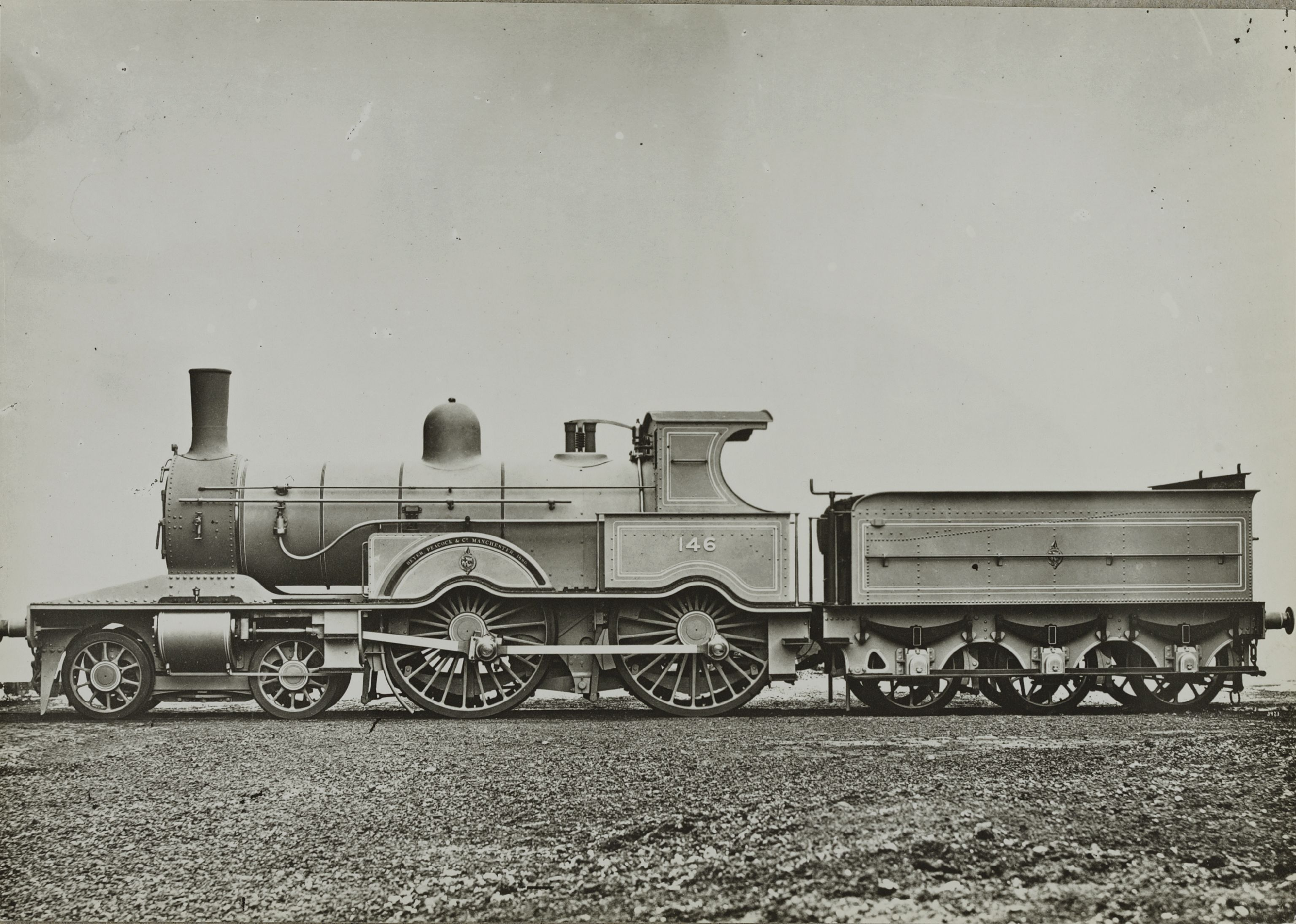
Type and origin
- Power type: Steam
- Designer: William Adams
- Builder: Beyer, Peacock and Company
- Serial number: 1948–1959
- Build date: 1880–1881
- Total produced: 12
Specifications
- Configuration
  - Whyte: 4-4-0
- Gauge: 4 ft 8 1/2 in (1,435 mm)
- Leading dia.: 3 ft 4 in (1.016 m)
- Driver dia.: 6 ft 7 in (2.007 m)
- Total weight: 73 long tons (74 t)
- Fuel type: Coal
- Boiler pressure: 160 lbf/in^{2} (1.10 MPa)
- Cylinders: Two, outside
- Cylinder size: 18 in × 24 in (457 mm × 610 mm)
Performance figures
- Tractive effort: 13,387 lbf (59.55 kN)
Career
- Operators: London and South Western Railway; Southern Railway
- Class: New: 135; 1902: 0135; 1914: 0307
- Power class: SR: K
- Locale: Great Britain
- Withdrawn: 1913, 1921–1924
- Disposition: All scrapped

The LSWR 135 class was a class of 4-4-0 express steam locomotives designed by William Adams for the London and South Western Railway and introduced in 1880. They were built by Beyer, Peacock and Company and received LSWR numbers 135–146.

Twelve locomotives were purchased and placed in service between November 1880 and January 1891. They were placed on the duplicate list and renumbered 0135 to 0146 in 1902. Seven were withdrawn in 1913; the remaining five, 135, 139, 140, 143 and 144 were renumbered in 1914. They became 0370, 0307, 0310, 0312 and 0347 respectively, still on the duplicate list. This renumbering effectively changed their classification to 0307 class. Only two were still in service to pass to the Southern Railway in 1923, but they were withdrawn the following year.

Table of withdrawals
Year	Quantity in service at start of year	Quantity withdrawn	Locomotive numbers	Notes
1913	12	7	0136–0138, 0141, 0142, 0145, 0146	
1921	5	1	0347	
1922	4	2	0370, 0312	
1924	2	2	0307, 0310	
