= Nine Elms Locomotive Works =

Coordinates: 51.4830°N 0.1279°W

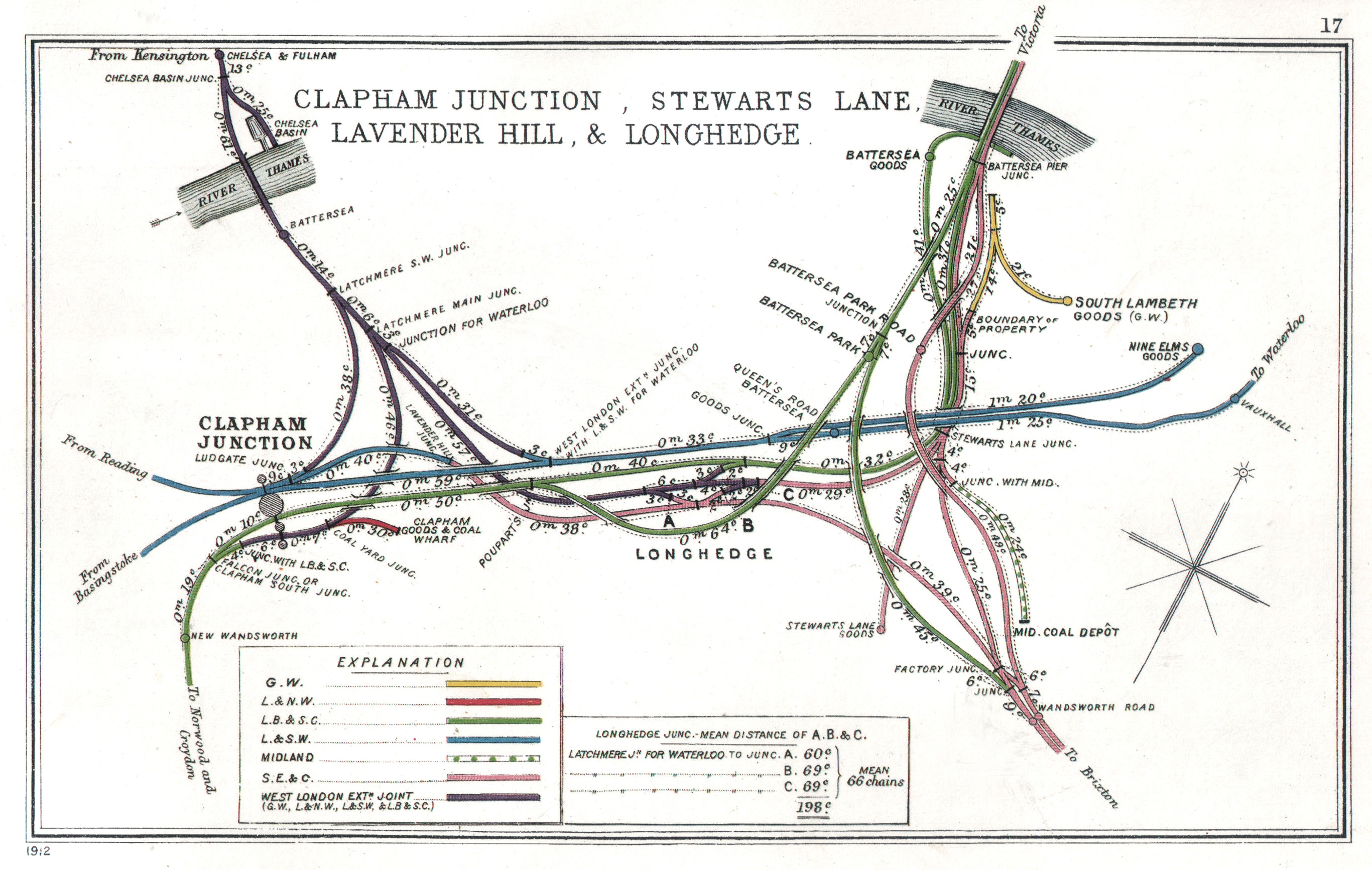
A 1912 Railway Clearing House map of lines around Nine Elms Locomotive Works

Nine Elms Locomotive Works were built in 1839 by the London and South Western Railway (LSWR) adjoining their passenger terminus near the Vauxhall end of Nine Elms Lane, in the district of Nine Elms in the London Borough of Battersea. They were rebuilt in 1841 and remained the principal locomotive carriage and wagon workshops of the railway until closure in stages between 1891 and 1909. Thereafter a large steam motive power depot remained open on the site until 1967, serving Waterloo railway station.

== Original works ==
The original locomotive, carriage and wagon workshops were built by the London and South Western Railway (LSWR) adjoining, and to the west of, their original passenger terminus near the Vauxhall end of Nine Elms Lane in 1839, but suffered a disastrous fire in March 1841. They were rebuilt and from 1843 were used to construct over one hundred new locomotives for the company, to the designs of John Viret Gooch and Joseph Hamilton Beattie.

== Second works ==
Within twenty years of their original construction it became apparent to Beattie that the restricted site originally chosen would be inadequate for the future needs of the company and so the facility was moved to a larger site south of the main line between 1861 and 1865.

The second Nine Elms works was responsible for the construction of more than 700 steam locomotives before closure in 1909, to the designs of Joseph Hamilton Beattie, his son William George Beattie, William Adams and Dugald Drummond. The company enlarged the workshops on a number of occasions and at its height in 1904 the locomotive works employed 2,438 men, building 22 and repairing 450 locomotives in a year.

By the mid-1880s it was clear that further expansion at Nine Elms would be impossible. The carriage and wagon shops were therefore transferred to Eastleigh in Hampshire in 1891, allowing for the temporary expansion of the locomotive works and the nearby motive power depot. Ultimately the locomotive works were transferred to Eastleigh between 1908 and December 1909.

== Motive power depot ==
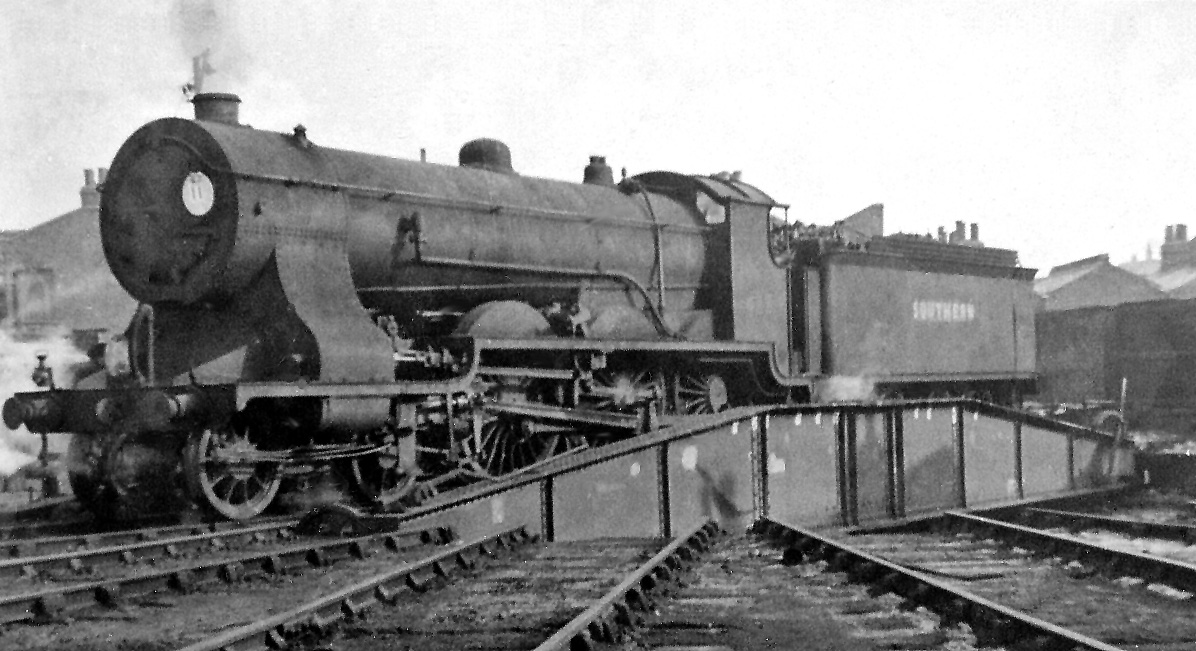
Ex-LSWR T14 class 4-6-0 on turntable at Nine Elms Locomotive Depot 1 March 1947.

The principal function of the adjoining motive power depot was to provide and service locomotives for Waterloo railway station. The original motive power depot was opened on the north side of the main line by the London and Southampton Railway on 21 May 1838. It was closed and demolished in 1865. A second larger shed was built in 1849 on a site later occupied by the Nine Elms Goods Depot. This also closed in 1865. A replacement for these sheds, on the south of the main line, was opened in 1865 and demolished in 1876 to make way for the widening of the main line. A brick semi-roundhouse was built in 1876 and demolished in 1909.

A large fifteen road (fifteen track) shed was opened in 1885, which later became known as the 'Old Shed'. It was badly damaged during the Second World War and never fully repaired. This was adjoined by a ten-road shed in 1910, which became known as the 'New Shed'.

The depot closed on 10th July 1967 after the end of steam working out of Waterloo. It was demolished later the same year and the site is now a part of the New Covent Garden Market.

The locomotive shed featured in the short film London's Nine Elms Locomotive Shed in 1960.

== Preserved locomotives ==
- LSWR T9 class No. 120 (BR 30120) is preserved at the Swanage Railway.
- LSWR T3 class No. 563 is preserved at the Swanage Railway.
- LSWR O2 class No. 24 Calbourne is preserved at the Isle of Wight Steam Railway.
- LSWR M7 class No. 245 is preserved at the National Railway Museum.
- LSWR M7 class No. 53 is preserved at the Swanage Railway.
- LSWR B4 class No. 96 (BR 30096) Normandy is preserved at the Bluebell Railway.
- LSWR B4 class No. 102 (BR 30102) Granville is preserved at Bressingham Steam and Gardens.
