= LCDR Dawn and Bluebell classes =

The LCDR Dawn and Bluebell classes were two classes of six 2-4-0 steam locomotives designed by William Martley for the London, Chatham and Dover Railway (LCDR) to haul passenger trains.

During 1860, the LCDR had ordered 29 passenger locomotives designed by Thomas Russell Crampton, the Tiger and Echo classes, which were subsequently delivered during 1861 and 1862. A further five Echo class locomotives had been provisionally ordered by Crampton from Sharp, Stewart and Company, but in late 1860 or early 1861, once Martley was in full control, he decided to cancel these in favour of five 2-4-0s from the same makers of a new design.

The order for what were to become the Dawn class was placed with Sharp Stewart in February 1861, for five locomotives with tenders at £3,234 each. As with the Tiger, Echo and Acis classes, the locomotives were equipped with the Cudworth coal-burning firebox. On a visit to Sharp Stewart to check on the progress of the Dawn class together with seven Acis class locomotives that were also being built there, Martley decided to cancel one of the Acis class locomotives and substitute it with one more of the Dawn class, bringing the totals to six of each. The six members of the Dawn class were delivered to the LCDR between October and November 1862. Whilst they were being delivered, a further six were ordered in October 1862, also from Sharp Stewart. These incorporated several design changes, and because of this they were known as the Bluebell class. They were delivered between April and June 1863.

Compared to the Dawn class, the Bluebell class had a boiler three inches smaller in diameter, but six inches longer, with the wheelbase increased by the same amount. Different materials were used for some components. Various modifications carried out at intervals between 1868 and 1893 eliminated some of the differences between the two classes, but also introduced differences within each class.

Like other LCDR locomotives delivered prior to 1874, the locomotives had no numbers at first, being distinguished by name. In November 1875, William Kirtley (who had replaced Martley following the latter's death in 1874) allotted the class letter N to the Dawn class, and P to the Bluebell class. The locomotives were then given the numbers 32–43, but the names were usually retained until the boiler was next replaced. All were still in service when the South Eastern and Chatham Railway (SECR) was formed at the start of 1899: their numbers were increased by 459 to avoid duplication with former South Eastern Railway locomotives, and so they became SECR nos. 491–502. Six (nos. 492–4/8/9, 502) were transferred to the duplicate list in 1903 and 1904 when their numbers were needed for new locomotives, and their numbers were suffixed with the letter "A". Withdrawal occurred between October 1903 and May 1908.

Name	Works no.	Built	LCDR Number	SECR Number	Withdrawn
Dawn	1347	October 1862	32	491	July 1907
Alert	1348	October 1862	33	492; 492A from April 1903	December 1904
Herald	1379	October 1862	34	493; 493A from April 1903	December 1904
Pioneer	1380	October 1862	35	494; 494A from April 1903	May 1905
Frolic	1381	November 1862	36	495	June 1904
Vigilant	1392	November 1862	37	496	March 1907
Violet	1414	April 1863	38	497	September 1907
Crocus	1415	April 1863	39	498; 498A from June 1904	February 1906
Snowdrop	1420	May 1863	40	499; 499A from June 1904	May 1908
Verbena	1421	May 1863	41	500	December 1905
Hyacinth	1422	June 1863	43	502; 502A from May 1903	June 1904
Bluebell	1423	June 1863	42	501	October 1903
