= LCDR Acis class =

LCDR Acis class LCDR H class
Type and origin
- Power type: Steam
- Designer: William Martley
- Builder: Sharp, Stewart & Co. (6); Robert Stephenson & Co. (8)
- Serial number: SS: 1280–1281, 1303–1304, 1327–1328; RSC: 1386–1393
- Build date: September 1861 – December 1862
- Total produced: 14
Specifications
- Configuration
  - Whyte: 0-6-0
  - UIC: C n2
- Gauge: 1,435 mm (4 ft 8 1/2 in)
- Driver dia.: 5 ft 0 in (1.524 m)
- Axle load
  - 1st coupled: 10 long tons 12 cwt (10.8 t)
  - 2nd coupled: 11 long tons 11 cwt (11.7 t)
  - 3rd coupled: 9 long tons 17 cwt (10.0 t)
- Loco weight: 32 long tons 0 cwt (32.5 t)
- Firebox
  - Grate area: 27.5 sq ft (2.55 m^{2})
- Boiler
  - Diameter: 4 ft 3 in (1.30 m)
  - Tube plates: 10 ft 6 in (3.200 m)
- Boiler pressure: 120 lbf/in^{2} (830 kPa; 8.4 kgf/cm^{2})
- Heating surface
  - Firebox: 122 sq ft (11.3 m^{2})
  - Tubes: 1,070 sq ft (99 m^{2})
  - Total surface: 1,192 sq ft (110.7 m^{2})
- Cylinders: Two, inside
- Cylinder size: 17 in × 24 in (432 mm × 610 mm)
Career
- Operators: London, Chatham and Dover Railway; South Eastern and Chatham Railway
- Withdrawn: June 1903 – December 1908
- Disposition: All scrapped

The LCDR Acis class was a class of fourteen 0-6-0 steam locomotives designed by William Martley for the London, Chatham and Dover Railway (LCDR) to haul goods trains.

Between 1859 and 1860, the LCDR board considered the need for new locomotives to operate lines then under construction. After consultation with various engineers, including Charles Patrick Stewart (of Sharp, Stewart and Company), Robert Sinclair (of the Eastern Counties Railway) and Thomas Russell Crampton, they decided upon forty new locomotives: eight 1st class fast locomotives, seventeen general purpose passenger locomotives, and fifteen goods locomotives. After discussion with William Martley, the quantities needed for the two passenger types were revised to five and 24 respectively. Tenders were sought, and these were considered in July 1860, when orders were placed with several firms for what were to become the Echo, Tiger and Acis classes.

The Acis class, intended to comprise 15 goods locomotives, were ordered from two firms: eight were ordered in July 1860 from Robert Stephenson and Company at £3,320 each; and after negotiations with various firms concerning prices and delivery dates, a further seven were ordered in August 1860 from Sharp, Stewart and Company at £3,284 each. As with the Echo and Tiger classes, the locomotives were equipped with the Cudworth coal-burning firebox. They were delivered to the LCDR between September 1861 and December 1862, but the Sharp Stewart order was reduced from seven to six in June 1862, and that firm was given an order for an additional locomotive of the Dawn class instead.

Like other LCDR locomotives delivered prior to 1874, the locomotives had no numbers at first, being distinguished by name. In November 1875, William Kirtley (who had replaced Martley following the latter's death in 1874) allotted the class letter H. The locomotives were then given the numbers 113–126. All were still in service when the South Eastern and Chatham Railway (SECR) was formed at the start of 1899: their numbers were increased by 459 to avoid duplication with former South Eastern Railway locomotives, and so they became SECR nos. 572–585. Four (nos. 574/5/9/85) were transferred to the duplicate list in 1903 and 1907 when their numbers were needed for new locomotives, and their numbers were suffixed with the letter "A". Withdrawal occurred between June 1903 and December 1908.

Name	Builder	Works no.	Built	LCDR Number	SECR Number	Withdrawn
Acis	Sharp, Stewart	1280	September 1861	113	572	June 1904
Calypso	Sharp, Stewart	1281	September 1861	114	573	December 1904
Diomede	Sharp, Stewart	1303	December 1861	115	574; 574A from February 1907	July 1908
Fortuna	Sharp, Stewart	1304	December 1861	116	575; 575A from September 1903	February 1908
Gordius	Sharp, Stewart	1327	June 1862	117	576	December 1904
Pyramus	Sharp, Stewart	1328	June 1862	118	577	April 1908
Amphitrite	Robert Stephenson	1386	August 1862	119	578	June 1904
Chloris	Robert Stephenson	1387	August 1862	120	579; 579A from October 1903	December 1908
Ianthe	Robert Stephenson	1388	September 1862	121	580	December 1903
Iris	Robert Stephenson	1389	September 1862	122	581	June 1904
Phyllis	Robert Stephenson	1390	October 1862	123	582	June 1903
Nestor	Robert Stephenson	1391	October 1862	124	583	August 1903
Tacita	Robert Stephenson	1392	October 1862	125	584	June 1903
Thisbe	Robert Stephenson	1393	December 1862	126	585; 585A from June 1903	March 1906

The cancelled Sharp, Stewart locomotive was to have been named Sphynx, and this name was used for one of the Tiger class in August 1862.
