= LB&SCR D1 class =

Class of steam locomotives

LB&SCR D1 Class
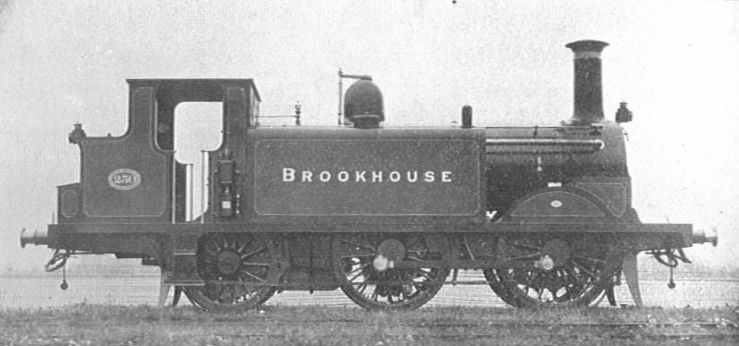
- D1 class, 230 Brookhouse, as built
Type and origin
- Power type: Steam
- Designer: William Stroudley
- Builder: Brighton works (90), Neilson & Co. (35)
- Build date: 1873–1887
- Total produced: 125
Specifications
- Configuration
  - Whyte: 0-4-2T
  - UIC: B1
- Gauge: 4 ft 8 1/2 in (1,435 mm) standard gauge
- Driver dia.: 5 ft 6 in (1.676 m)
- Trailing dia.: 4 ft 6 in (1.372 m)
- Wheelbase: 15 ft 0 in (4.57 m)
- Adhesive weight: 27 long tons (27.4 t; 30.2 short tons)
- Loco weight: 38.15 long tons (38.76 t; 42.73 short tons)
- Fuel type: Coal
- Fuel capacity: 1.5 long tons (1.5 t; 1.7 short tons)
- Water cap.: 860 imperial gallons (3,900 L; 1,030 US gal)
- Firebox
  - Grate area: 15 sq ft (1.4 m^{2})
- Boiler pressure: 140 psi (9.7 bar; 0.97 MPa); 150 psi (10 bar; 1.0 MPa) (later)
- Heating surface: 1,029 sq ft (95.6 m^{2})
- Cylinders: Two, inside
- Cylinder size: 17 in × 24 in (432 mm × 610 mm)
Performance figures
- Tractive effort: 13,399 lbf (59.60 kN)
Career
- Operators: LB&SCR; Southern Railway; British Railways
- Class: D1
- Power class: BR: 0P
- Nicknames: "D-Tanks"
- Locale: Southern Region
- First run: 1873
- Withdrawn: 1903–51
- Disposition: All scrapped

The LB&SCR D1 class were powerful 0-4-2 suburban passenger tank locomotives, designed by William Stroudley of the London, Brighton and South Coast Railway in 1873. They were originally known as "D-tanks" but later reclassified as class D1. Members of this very successful class survived in service until 1951.

== Background ==
The D1 class were Stroudley's second tank engine class, intended for heavier tasks than could be undertaken by his A1 class "Terriers" which had been introduced in 1872. They had larger 5 ft 6 in driving wheels and a 140 psi (970 kPa) boiler pressure. Between November 1873 and March 1887, 125 locomotives of the class were built, 90 of which at Brighton railway works and the remainder by Neilson and Company After 1883, new locomotives were given boilers with 150 psi (1,000 kPa) pressure, and in 1892 following Stroudley's death, the boiler pressure for replacement boilers was raised to 160 psi (1,100 kPa).

== Pre-grouping ==
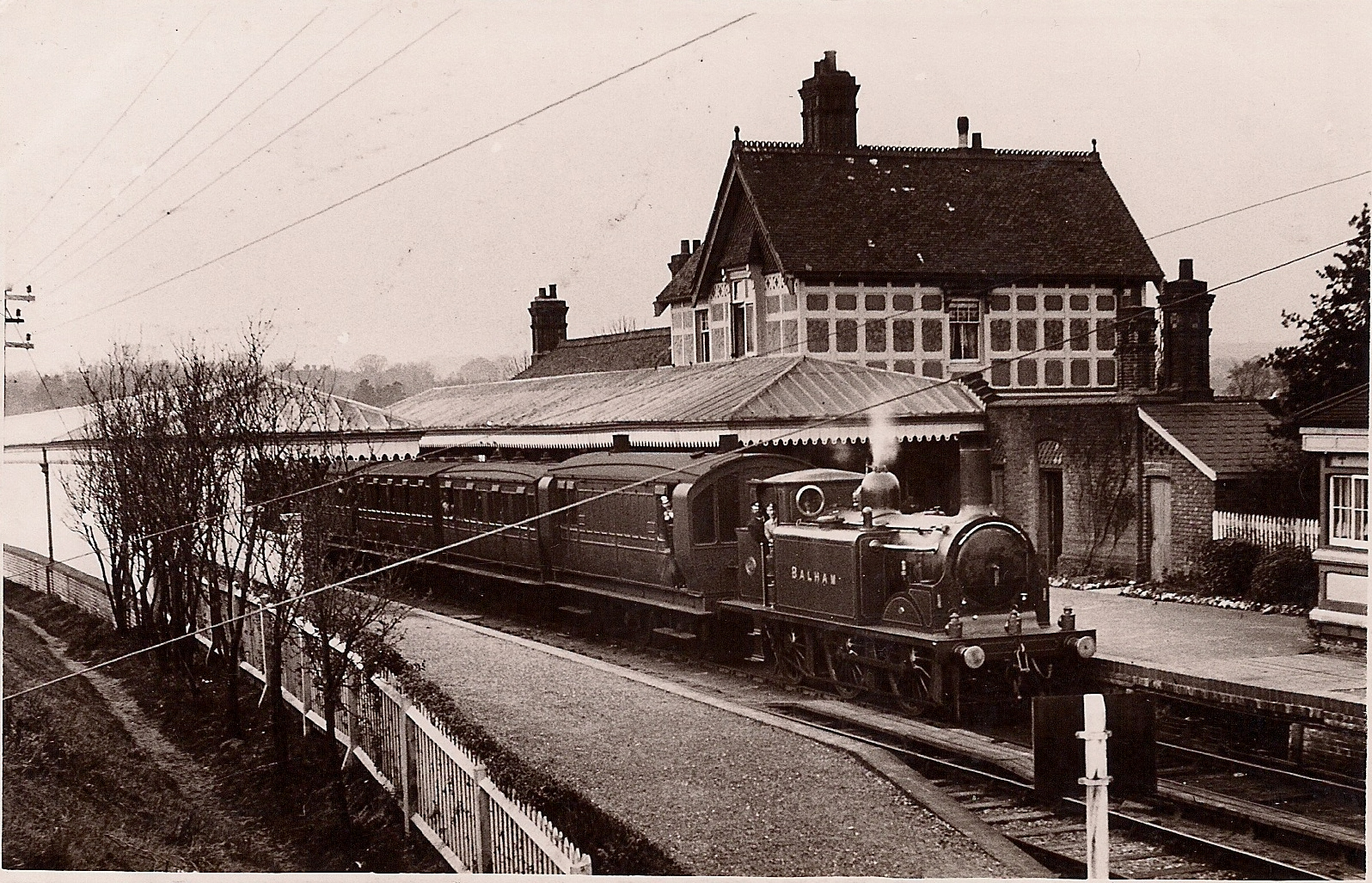

The class was the mainstay of the LB&SCR outer suburban services for twenty years, until gradually replaced by R. J. Billinton's D3 class 0-4-4 tank engines in the mid-1890s. Thereafter they were used on a variety of secondary passenger, and occasionally freight services throughout the railway. The first locomotive was withdrawn in December 1903, but many of the locomotives were still in good condition and popular with the engine crews. Douglas Earle Marsh therefore sought to rebuild six examples with a larger boiler and cylinders in 1910. In the event, only one locomotive, number 79A, was rebuilt. This locomotive was known as D1X class, but although it was more powerful than the originals, it was found to be unsteady at speed and so no further rebuilds were authorised. Of the other five new boilers, one was used to rebuild E1 class no. 89 in 1911, and the other four were put to stationary use at various places on the LBSCR system.

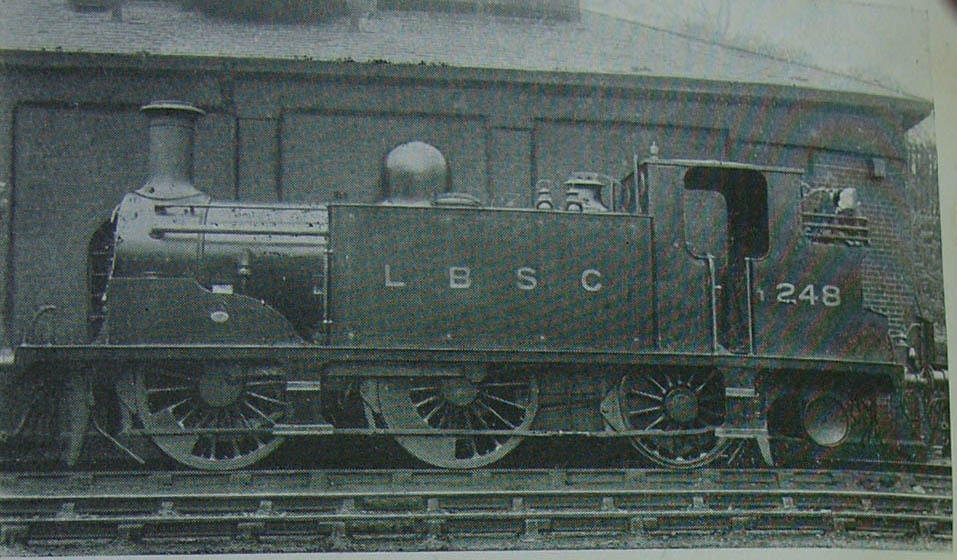
Class D1 with modified tanks

== Post-grouping ==
There were 84 D1 and D1X locomotives surviving in December 1922 at the grouping of the railways of southern England to form the Southern Railway. The class continued to find useful work on secondary services throughout the new railway, often in preference to far newer locomotives. During the Second World War six surviving examples were loaned to the London, Midland and Scottish Railway and served in the north of Scotland. Nine examples were fitted with water pumps and firefighting equipment and were stationed at the major motive power depots in London to deal with incendiary bomb attacks.

== British Railways ==
Twenty members of the class survived the nationalisation of the Southern Railway to form British Railways in January 1948 but many of these had been in storage for several years. The last surviving example in BR service was withdrawn from Nine Elms in December 1951 and no examples have been preserved.

== Private ownership ==
In 1947, the Whittingham Hospital Railway in Lancashire acquired number 2357 from the Southern Railway at a cost of £750. It was renamed James Fryers in honour of the Chairman of the Hospital Management Committee. Serious boiler defects in 1956 curtailed its working career and the engine was scrapped that year when it proved beyond economic repair. At that time, it was the sole surviving member of its class.

== Accidents and incidents ==
- On 1 September 1897, an Eastbourne to Tunbridge Wells train crashed at Tooth's Bank, between Heathfield and Mayfield. The locomotive ('D1' Class tank No. 297 Bonchurch) and several carriages left the track and fell down an embankment, resulting in the death of the driver, James McKenly, and injuries to the fireman and 30 passengers. At the inquiry, Lt. Col. G. W. Addison reported that the main cause of the accident was excessive speed as the driver was attempting to make up lost time in order to make a connection at Groombridge. The track itself was in poor shape with many rotten sleepers and "curves having irregular elevation" which contributed to the accident. Following the inquiry, much of the track was relaid and the train scheduling was altered.
- In 1904, a freight train hauled by locomotive No. 239 Patcham was derailed at Cocking, West Sussex.
- On 3 April 1916, a passenger train hauled by locomotive No. 273 Dornden was derailed between Crowborough & Jarvis Brook and Buxted stations, East Sussex.
- On 4 August 1920, a passenger train was unable to stop at Littlehampton due to an error leaving it with insufficient brake force. Locomotive No. 360 ran through a buffer stop and ended up in the road. Thirteen people were injured.

== Descendants ==
The D1 class had a lasting influence on a number of locomotive classes designed by Stroudley himself, and his two assistants Robert Billinton and Dugald Drummond.

Stroudley produced a tender locomotive version of the design for secondary passenger duties which was later classified D2, and then went on to build express passenger versions of the 'Richmond' and B1 classes. Likewise, Billinton extended the design to create his D3 passenger tanks.

During the 1870s Drummond built six 0-4-2 tank locomotives that were almost identical for the North British Railway after 1875. He too extended the design to produce the first of his several successful 0-4-4T designs for the North British and Caledonian Railway. Drummond's successful LSWR M7 class is also a direct descendant of the D1 class.

== Sources ==
- Bradley, D.L. (June 1972). Locomotives of the London Brighton and South Coast Railway: Part 2. London: Railway Correspondence and Travel Society. ISBN 0-901115-21-5.
- Casserley, H.C (May 1957). "The Whittingham Railway". Railway Magazine. Vol. 103. pp. 312–313, 320.
- Ellis, Hamilton (1949). Some classic locomotives. George Allen and Unwin.
- Worsfold, B.G. (February 1954). "The Stroudley "D" Tanks" (PDF). The Railway Magazine. Vol. 100. pp. 92–96.
- Ahrons, E. L. (1927) The British Steam Railway Locomotive from 1825 to 1925, London Locomotive Publishing Co. Ltd. (p. 199)
