= LB&SCR Belgravia class =

London, Brighton and South Coast Railway "Belgravia" Class
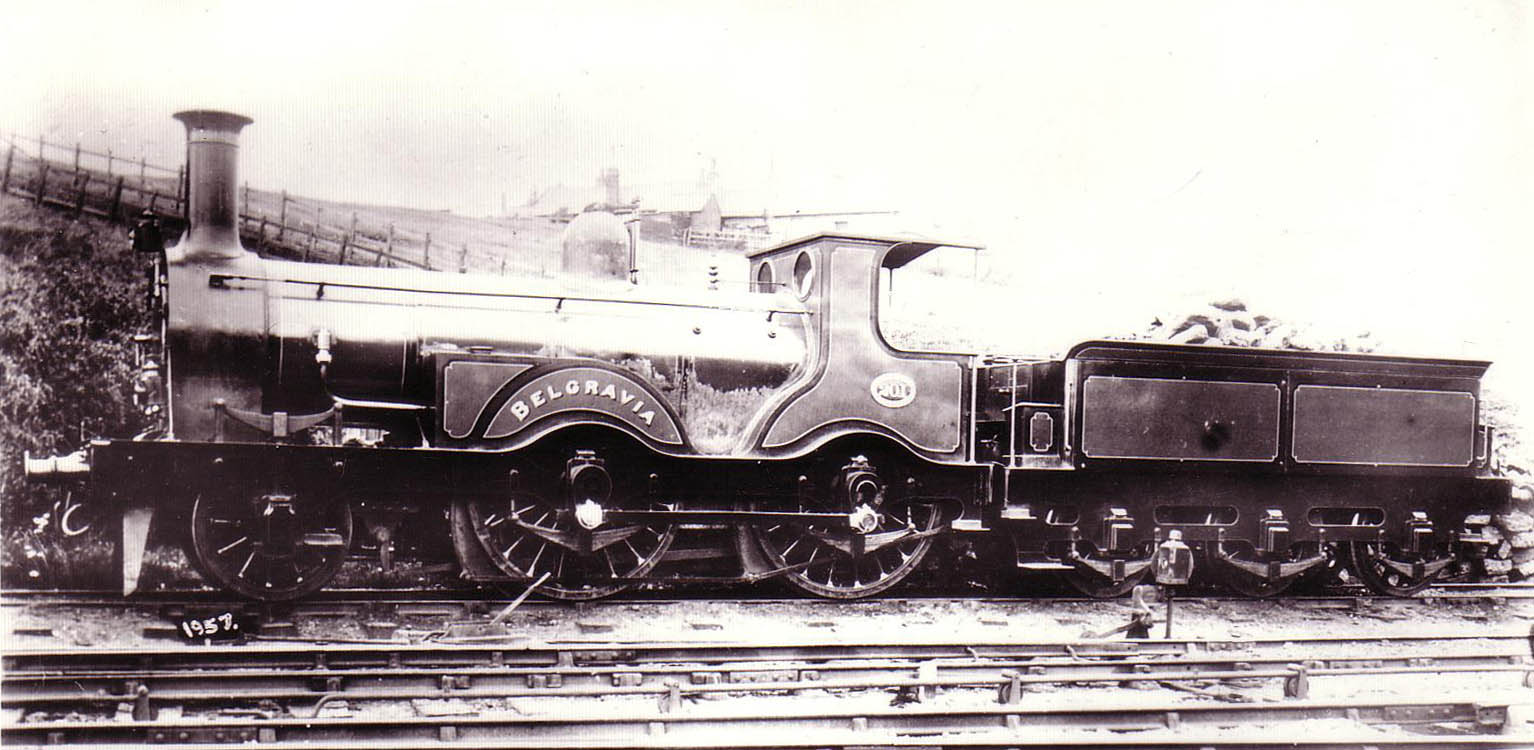
- Locomotive Belgravia as built in 1872
Type and origin
- Power type: Steam
- Designer: William Stroudley
- Builder: Brighton railway works
- Build date: 1872-1876
- Total produced: 6
Specifications
- Configuration
  - Whyte: 2-4-0
  - UIC: 1'B
- Gauge: 4 ft 8 1/2 in (1,435 mm) standard gauge
- Leading dia.: 4 ft 0 in (1.22 m) (204/5); 4 ft 3 in (1.30 m) (201/2); 4 ft 1 in (1.24 m) (206/7)
- Driver dia.: 6 ft 6 in (1.98 m)
- Wheelbase: 16 ft 8 in (5.08 m)
- Adhesive weight: 15 long tons (15.2 t; 16.8 short tons)
- Loco weight: 39.7 long tons (40.3 t; 44.5 short tons) (201/2); 39.25 long tons (39.88 t; 43.96 short tons) (204/5); 41.2 long tons (41.9 t; 46.1 short tons) (206/7)
- Fuel type: Coal
- Firebox
  - Grate area: 18.75 sq ft (1.742 m^{2}) (201/2/4/5); 19 sq ft (1.8 m^{2}) (206/7)
- Boiler pressure: 140 lbf/in^{2} (9.7 bar; 970 kPa)
- Heating surface: 1,234 sq ft (114.6 m^{2}); 1,123 sq ft (104.3 m^{2})
- Cylinders: Two, inside
- Cylinder size: 17 in × 24 in (432 mm × 610 mm)
Career
- Operators: London, Brighton and South Coast Railway
- Class: B
- Number in class: 6
- Numbers: 201/2/4–7
- Locale: Great Britain
- First run: 1872
- Withdrawn: 1899–1902
- Disposition: All scrapped

The LB&SCR Belgravia class were 2-4-0 passenger locomotives designed by William Stroudley of the London Brighton and South Coast Railway (LB&SCR) in 1872 for secondary passenger duties.

== History ==
When William Stroudley took up his duties as Locomotive Superintendent at the LB&SCR's Brighton railway works in 1870, he found that some locomotive components had been ordered by his predecessor, John Chester Craven. These included six sets of frames for some 2-4-0 passenger locomotives designed by Craven, and Stroudley produced a new class of that arrangement to use these frames.

The locomotives in this class were very similar to two 2-4-0 locomotives constructed at Cowlairs railway works for the Edinburgh and Glasgow Railway in the early 1860s, when Stroudley was the works manager and contained many features of his later designs.

Four Belgravia locomotives were constructed at Brighton in 1872, two of which were rebuilds of earlier 2-2-2 locomotives built for the LB&SCR by Robert Stephenson and Company and Brighton works. The necessity to use components designed by Craven meant that the locomotives had a number of design features, such as the double frames and the 2-4-0 wheel arrangement, which were not found with Stroudley's later designs, and were the heaviest 2-4-0 locomotives of their time. Two further examples later appeared, one each in 1875 and 1876, these having detail differences from the first four. At first the class suffered from poor steaming, but once this was rectified they went on to give reliable service on secondary passenger trains as well as hauling the "business" expresses between Brighton and London Bridge until about 1881.

Under Stroudley's locomotive classification scheme, the Belgravia class, being "Main Line Express" engines, were included in Class B, along with most of his 0-4-2 locomotives, and one of his 2-2-2s. By the time that Class B was subdivided into B1, B2, etc. by D. E. Marsh, none of the Belgravia class remained in service.

== Numbering ==
The two rebuilds were No. 204 Westminster and No. 205 Kensington. The two new engines of 1872 were No. 202 Goodwood and No. 201 Belgravia. The 1875 loco was No. 206 Carisbrooke, and the 1876 loco was No. 207 Freshwater. In 1897, the numbers were increased by 300; Nos. 501 and 504 were withdrawn in February 1899, but the other four had their numbers increased by a further 100 later the same year. Nos. 605–7 were withdrawn in 1901, leaving No. 602 which was withdrawn in 1902. No examples have been preserved.

== Sources ==
- Ahrons, E.L. (1987) [1927]. The British Steam Railway Locomotive 1825-1925. London: Bracken Books. ISBN 1-85170-103-6.
- Bradley, D.L. (June 1969). The locomotives of the London, Brighton & South Coast Railway: Part 1. London: Railway Correspondence and Travel Society.
- Haresnape, Brian (1985). Stroudley Locomotives: A Pictorial History. Shepperton: Ian Allan. ISBN 0-7110-1391-8.
