= List of LB&SCR D2 class locomotives =

Below is the list of the D2 class locomotives that ran on the London, Brighton and South Coast Railway.

D2 class locomotive fleet summary
First No.	LB&SCR Name	Build date	Second No.	Date renumbered	Withdrawn
300	Lyons	September 1876			June 1903
301	Caen	March 1877			November 1902
302	Turin	January 1878			July 1904
303	Milan	January 1878			June 1903
304	Nice	December 1877			July 1904
305	Genoa	December 1877			December 1904
306	Naples	April 1878			December 1904
307	Venice	April 1878			November 1902
308	Como	July 1883			December 1904
309	Splugen	July 1883	609	September 1906	March 1907
310	Laval	July 1883			July 1906
311	Rhone	July 1883			January 1907
312	Albion	September 1883	612	March 1905	February 1907
313	Paris	October 1883	613	March 1905	March 1907

== Sources ==
- Bradley, D.L. (1972) The locomotives of the London, Brighton & South Coast Railway: Part 2, The Railway Correspondence and Travel Society, ISBN 0-901115-21-5
