= LB&SCR Richmond class =

London Brighton and South Coast Railway Richmond Class
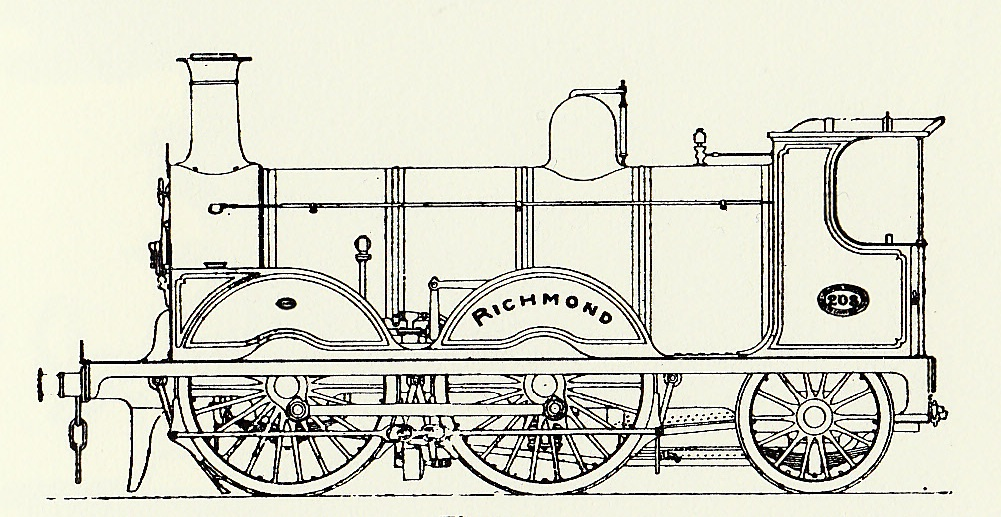
- Diagram of a Richmond class 0-4-2
Type and origin
- Power type: Steam
- Designer: William Stroudley
- Builder: Brighton Works
- Build date: 1878–1880
- Total produced: 6
Specifications
- Configuration
  - Whyte: 0-4-2
  - UIC: B1'n
- Driver dia.: 6 ft 6 in (1.981 m)
- Trailing dia.: 4 ft 6 in (1.372 m)
- Loco weight: 37 long tons 0 cwt (37.6 t; 41.4 short tons) (82,900 lb or 37,600 kg)
- Boiler pressure: 150 psi (1,034 kPa)
- Cylinders: Two
- Cylinder size: 17.25 in × 26 in (438 mm × 660 mm)
Performance figures
- Tractive effort: 12,646 lbf (56.3 kN)
Career
- Operators: London Brighton and South Coast Railway
- Class: B
- Numbers: 208–213
- Locale: Great Britain
- Withdrawn: 1901–1904
- Disposition: All scrapped

The LB&SCR Richmond class, 0-4-2 express passenger locomotives, were designed by William Stroudley of the London Brighton and South Coast Railway in 1877. They were a larger version of his "Lyons" class (D2) which were in turn developed from his successful "D-tank" class of 1873.

The six locomotives in this class were built at Brighton railway works and appeared in traffic between October 1878 and March 1880, intended to replace earlier classes designed by John Chester Craven on the heaviest express trains between London and Brighton. They performed well on these duties for a decade but were eventually replaced by Stroudley's larger "Gladstone" class (B1). They were then transferred to Eastbourne and St Leonards to work on expresses from those towns.

During the winter of 1900/01 members of the class were transferred to the duplicate list. Withdrawal commenced in April 1901 and was completed by November 1904. No examples were preserved.

They were originally classified as "B class" together with the members of the larger "Gladstone class". As all six locomotives had been withdrawn before D.E. Marsh introduced his letter/number classification scheme, they were never officially allocated a new class designation. They were, however, described as 'D3 class'.

== Sources ==
- Bradley, D.L. (1972). The locomotives of the London, Brighton & South Coast Railway: Part 2. The Railway Correspondence and Travel Society. ISBN 0-901115-21-5.
- Searle, David (12 January 1999). "Richmond Locomotives". The London, Brighton & South Coast Railway. Archived from the original on 18 February 2012.
