= LCDR Tiger class =

LDCR Tiger class LCDR G class
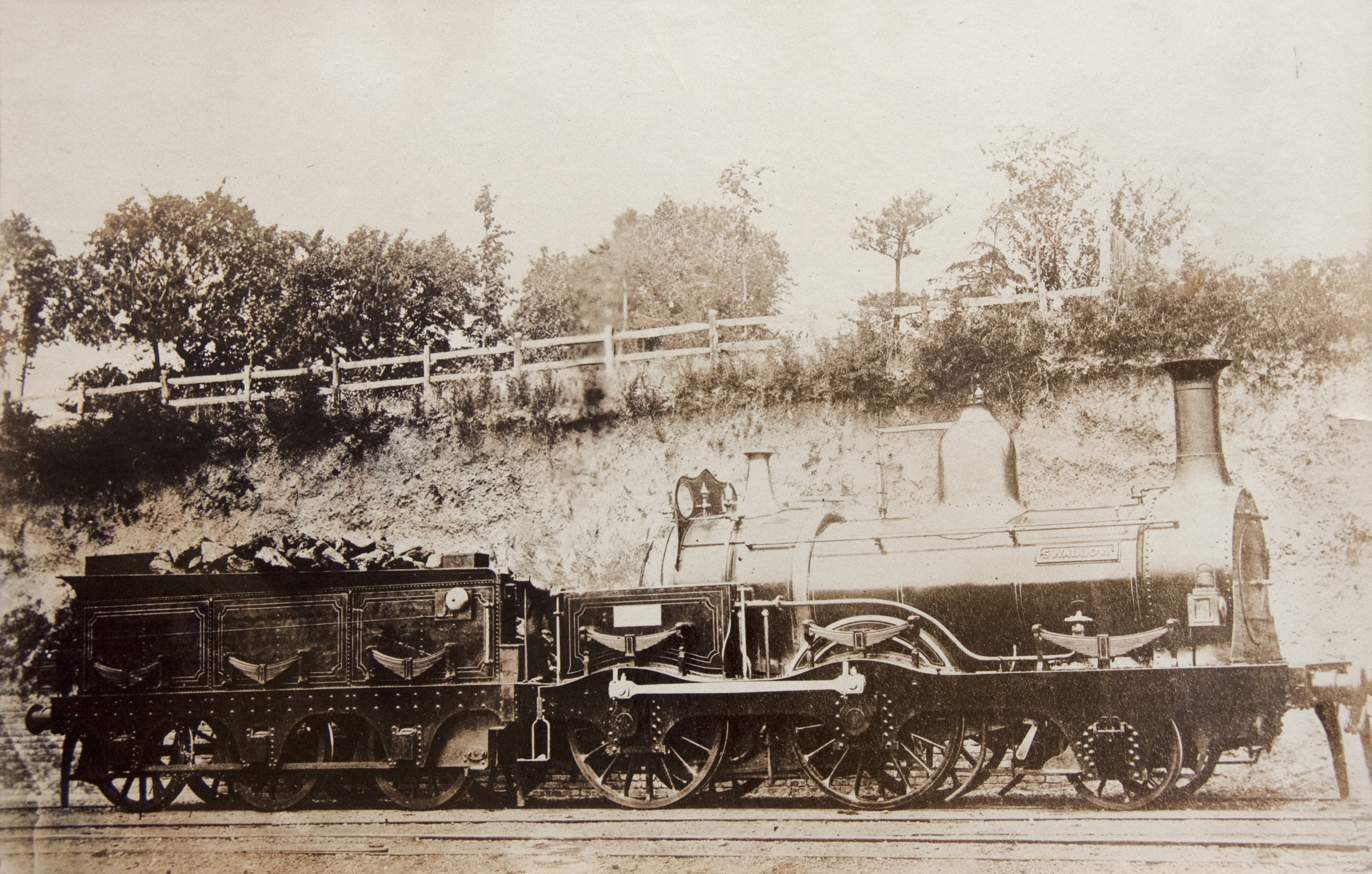
- LCDR Swallow, rebuilt as a 2-4-0
Type and origin
- Power type: Steam
- Builder: Peto, Brassey and Betts (10); Slaughter, Grüning & Co. (6); R. & W. Hawthorn & Co. (8)
- Serial number: SG: 456–451; RWH: 1120–1127
- Build date: August 1861 – August 1862
- Total produced: 25
Specifications
- Configuration
  - Whyte: 4-4-0 rebuilt as 2-4-0
  - UIC: 1B n2
- Fuel type: Coal
- Boiler
  - Diameter: 4 ft 3 in (1.295 m)
  - Tube plates: 10 ft 3 in (3.124 m)
- Boiler pressure: 120 lbf/in^{2} (830 kPa; 8.4 kgf/cm^{2})
- Heating surface: 1,200 sq ft (110 m^{2})
- Cylinders: Two, inside
- Cylinder size: 16 in × 22 in (406 mm × 559 mm)
- Valve gear: Gooch
Career
- Operators: London, Chatham and Dover Railway; South Eastern and Chatham Railway
- Withdrawn: January 1892 – March 1907
- Disposition: All scrapped

The LCDR Tiger class was a class of twenty-four steam 4-4-0 locomotives. They were designed by Thomas Russell Crampton for the London, Chatham and Dover Railway (LCDR) as general purpose passenger locomotives.

Between 1859 and 1860, the LCDR board considered the need for new locomotives to operate lines then under construction. After consultation with various engineers, including Charles Patrick Stewart (of Sharp, Stewart and Company), Robert Sinclair (of the Eastern Counties Railway) and Crampton, they decided upon forty new locomotives: eight first class fast locomotives, seventeen general purpose passenger locomotives, and fifteen goods locomotives. After discussion with William Martley, the quantities needed for the two passenger types were revised to 5 and 24 respectively. Tenders were sought, and these were considered in July 1860, when orders were placed with several firms for what were to become the Echo, Tiger and Acis classes.

The Tiger class, comprising 24 general purpose passenger locomotives, were ordered from three firms: Peto, Brassey and Betts were to build ten at £3,280 each; Slaughter, Grüning & Co. were to build six at £3,300 each; and R. & W. Hawthorn & Co. would build eight at £3,415 each. As with the Echo and Acis classes, the locomotives were equipped with the Cudworth coal-burning firebox. They were delivered to the LCDR between August 1861 and August 1862.

Soon after entering service, problems began to occur: the drivers complained of difficulties when starting and also of unsteady running, some locomotives becoming derailed; whilst others developed distorted frames or broke down in other ways. The maintenance costs were found to be far in excess of other locomotives such as the Ruby and Brigand classes. The three manufacturers refused to accept responsibility, since they had been working to drawings and specifications supplied to them by the LCDR. Accordingly, during 1862–65, the Tiger class were rebuilt at Longhedge Railway Works with the 2-4-0 wheel arrangement and modified frames, after which they became much more satisfactory in regard to acceleration, stability and maintenance costs.

Like other LCDR locomotives delivered prior to 1874, the locomotives had no numbers at first, being distinguished by name. In November 1875, William Kirtley (who had replaced Martley following the latter's death in 1874) allotted the class letter G. The locomotives were then given the numbers 3–26. Withdrawal began in January 1892, and by the time that the South Eastern and Chatham Railway (SECR) was formed at the start of 1899, nine remained in service. Of these, four were transferred directly to the duplicate list and had their LCDR numbers suffixed with the letter A; four had their numbers increased by 459 to avoid duplication with former South Eastern Railway locomotives; and one was both increased by 459 and suffixed A. The last one was withdrawn in March 1907.

Name	Builder	Works no.	Built	Rebuilt	LCDR Number	SECR Number	Withdrawn
Falcon	Peto, Brassey & Betts	—	August 1861	1863	3	—	April 1897
Vulture	Peto, Brassey & Betts	—	August 1861	1862	4	4A	June 1903
Heron	Peto, Brassey & Betts	—	August 1861	1864	5	—	October 1896
Stork	Peto, Brassey & Betts	—	August 1861	1864	6	—	April 1898
Swift	Peto, Brassey & Betts	—	September 1861	1862	7	—	July 1897
Dottrel	Peto, Brassey & Betts	—	September 1861	1864	8	8A	June 1903
Swallow	Peto, Brassey & Betts	—	October 1861	1863	9	9A	September 1904
Ostrich	Peto, Brassey & Betts	—	October 1861	1863	10	10A	November 1904
Petrel	Peto, Brassey & Betts	—	October 1861	1863	11	470	March 1905
Pelican	Peto, Brassey & Betts	—	November 1861	1865	12	—	May 1895
Lynx	Slaughter, Grüning	446	November 1861	1863	13	—	February 1896
Gorilla	Slaughter, Grüning	447	November 1861	1865	14	—	January 1892
Tiger	Slaughter, Grüning	448	December 1861	1863	16	—	November 1893
Leopard	Slaughter, Grüning	449	December 1861	1865	18	477	March 1907
Jackall	Slaughter, Grüning	450	January 1862	1863	19	—	November 1896
Panther	Slaughter, Grüning	451	February 1862	1863	21	480	January 1904
Cerberus	Hawthorn	1120	December 1861	1864	15	—	October 1894
Gorgon	Hawthorn	1121	December 1861	1864	17	—	November 1893
Harpy	Hawthorn	1122	February 1862	1864	20	—	January 1894
Pegasus	Hawthorn	1123	March 1862	1865	22	481	December 1904
Satyr	Hawthorn	1124	April 1862	1865	23	—	July 1896
Lethe; later Sphynx	Hawthorn	1125	May 1862	1865	24	—	August 1897
Siren	Hawthorn	1126	July 1862	1865	25; 25A from July 1892	—	August 1895
Xanthus	Hawthorn	1127	August 1862	1864	26	485A	February 1901

Lethe was renamed Sphynx in August 1862, because the railway staff found the name difficult to pronounce.
