= LB&SCR D3 class =

Class of British steam locomotives

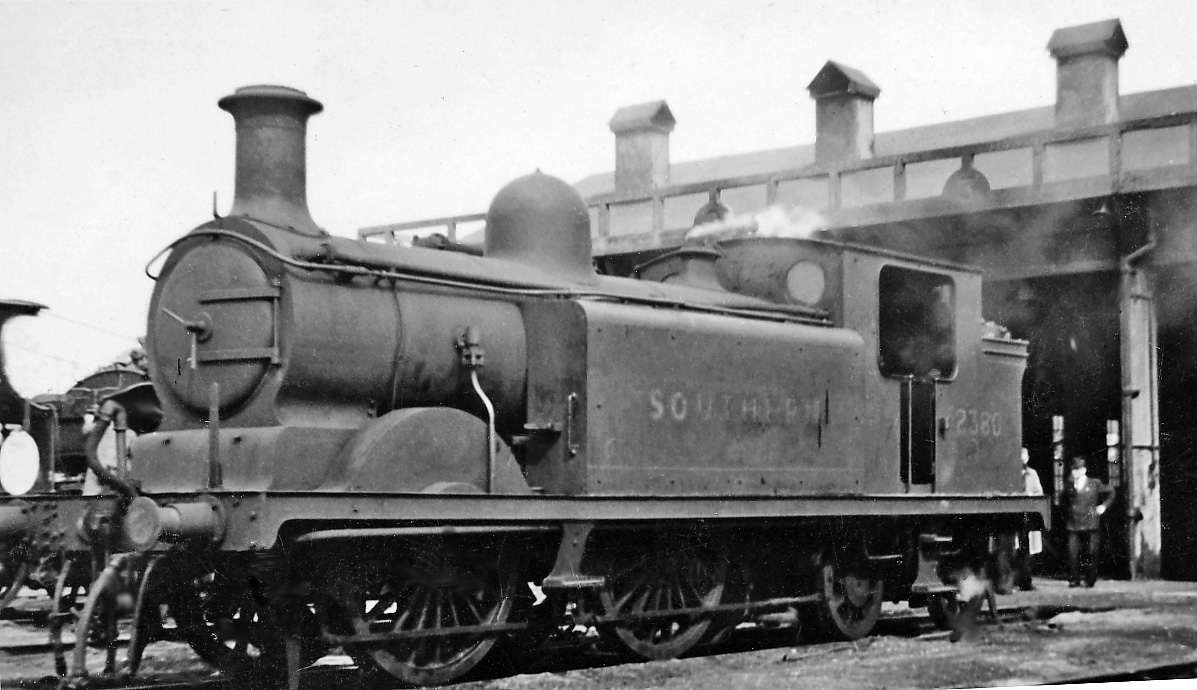
- D3 0-4-4T 2380 at Ashford Locomotive Depot in 1946
Type and origin
- Power type: Steam
- Designer: R. J. Billinton
- Builder: Brighton Works
- Build date: 1892–1896
- Total produced: 36
Specifications
- Configuration
  - Whyte: 0-4-4T
- Gauge: 4 ft 8 1/2 in (1,435 mm) standard gauge
- Driver dia.: 5 ft 6 in (1.676 m)
- Loco weight: 52 long tons 0 cwt (116,500 lb or 52.8 t) (58.2 short tons)
- Fuel type: Coal
- Boiler pressure: 170 psi (11.72 bar; 1.17 MPa)
- Cylinders: Two, inside
- Cylinder size: 17.5 in × 26 in (444 mm × 660 mm)
Performance figures
- Tractive effort: 17,435 lbf (77.6 kN)
Career
- Operators: London, Brighton and South Coast Railway, Southern Railway, British Railways
- Class: D3
- Power class: BR: 1P
- Withdrawn: 1933–1955
- Disposition: All scrapped

LB&SCR D3 class was a class of 0-4-4T tank locomotives designed by R. J. Billinton for the London, Brighton and South Coast Railway (LB&SCR) between 1892 and 1896. They were built for working passenger trains along country and main lines.

== Construction and working ==
Before joining the LB&SCR, Billinton worked for the Midland Railway's locomotive department; hence he was used to 0-4-4T designs, which that company used for similar work to what the D3's were intended for. The design was proposed as an improved version of William Stroudley's D1 tanks, the D3 being expected to replace the D1s on certain duties. The design shared some parts with Billinton's other designs: the cylinders were common with the C2 goods engines, and the boilers with the E4 radial tanks.

Their first employment was on services around Tunbridge Wells and outer-suburban work into London. One locomotive, No. 363, was named after the company's chairman, Sir Julian Goldsmid, who was so fond of the engine that he had an image of it used on the railway's cap badges. Another locomotive, No. 375 Glynde, was used to haul an armoured train for the 1st Sussex Volunteers for two years from 1896.

The whole class, along with other Billinton and Stroudley engines, was reboilered. Two were rebuilt with larger boilers as class D3x, but these proved to be ineffective; smaller boilers were used on the rest, which remained as class D3. After the First World War the operating scope of the class was increasingly more on the system's rural routes.

== Southern Railway ==
The locomotives passed to the Southern Railway (SR) in 1923. They were soon seeing new changes, as ten members of the class were moved to London Bridge to act as carriage shunters. From 1931 the repairs and overhauls of the class were undertaken at Ashford works rather than at Brighton, after the latter works was mothballed.

Electrification and the transfer of locomotives from other areas were the first real threats to the class's survival; some spent time in store, and the first withdrawals took place in 1933. However, during the 1930s the SR fitted the D3s for working motor trains (otherwise known as push-pull trains) to replace D1 tanks, though the D3s were considered rougher riding.

== Luftwaffe versus D3 ==
During World War II, on 26 November 1942, one engine, number 2365, was working an afternoon New Romney to Ashford passenger train through the Romney Marshes near Lydd when she was attacked by a low-flying German fighter aircraft. Cannon fire from the plane caused the dome on the top of the engine's boiler to burst, but no railway staff or passengers were hurt. Either by actual contact as he misjudged his dive, or in the sudden uprush of steam from the boiler, the pilot lost control of his plane and, as it crashed, he was flung out and drowned in a dyke. The engine was reboilered and returned to service on the New Romney branch early the following year.

Other members of the class which had been stored before the war found themselves being pressed back into service; when fears for an invasion were at their worst, this led to some being moved away to other places, including Salisbury.

D3 class engine no. 32390 at Three Bridges station

== British Railways ==
Twenty-eight locomotives passed to British Railways in 1948, and they were numbered 32364-32398 (with gaps). Although still working motor trains successfully, the class in general were becoming worn out. The D3s were replaced by former South Eastern H class and South Western M7 class tanks engines during the early 1950s. Most were withdrawn by 1953, but one, 32390, remained in traffic for two more years until being cut up at Brighton Works in 1955. During those two years she was used to cover for failing M7s from Tunbridge Wells, or for special railtours. Her last days were spent working from Brighton on services to Horsham. None of the engines has survived into preservation.

== Accidents and incidents ==
Sometime before being withdrawn in 1955, No. 2390, formerly named St. Leonards, crashed through the shed wall.
