= Boiler Shop =

Music venue in Newcastle-upon-Tyne, England

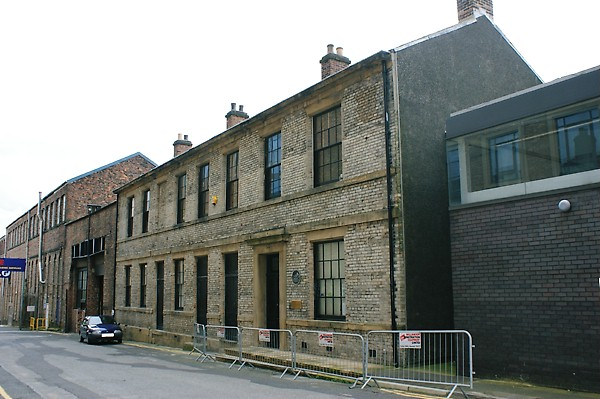
- 20 South Street and the boiler shop in 2008; what is now the entrance to the venue is behind the parked car
- Interactive map of Boiler Shop
- Former names: Robert Stephenson and Company locomotive works
- Address: South Street; Newcastle-upon-Tyne
- Coordinates: 54°58′2″N 1°36′55″W
- Capacity: 1000 standing, 600 seated

Construction
- Built: 1823
- Opened: 2017

Website
- www.boilershop.net

The Boiler Shop is a live music and entertainment venue in Newcastle-upon-Tyne, England. The venue is situated in the former offices and workshops of the Robert Stephenson and Company locomotive manufacturing works, dating from 1823; it is a Grade II* listed building. It opened in its current form in 2017 after the current custodians, David and Richard Clouston, completed a restoration programme in the previous year.

== History ==
The original locomotive manufacturing works was on a site between Forth Street and South Street, just north of the River Tyne; it opened in 1823, and built some of the very earliest steam locomotives, such as Locomotion No. 1, the first locomotive to haul a passenger train on a public railway and the historically important Stephenson's Rocket. It closed in 1904 when Stephenson relocated to a larger premises near Darlington; the locomotive shops were taken over by R. & W. Hawthorn, Leslie and Company and much of the rest of the site by George Jobling who built bicycles, cars, and during World War I, aircraft. The Forth Street works closed in 1960 and many of the buildings were later demolished.

The office block (20 South Street) and one of the main workshops (the "boiler shop", where locomotives were built) of the Forth Street Works were restored by The Robert Stephenson Trust, but they lost the lease to these buildings in 2009, following the purchase of much of the works site for redevelopment as a mixed-use development named "Stephenson Quarter". Phase One of this scheme included the development of the South Street buildings as the Boiler Shop, and this was completed in 2016. The first major concert held there was in 2017, when Einstürzende Neubauten played their first show in Newcastle.

== Music venue ==
The main hall of the venue holds 1,000 people in standing configuration and 600 seated; most events are standing only although there is a viewing platform for those using wheelchairs or with other physical requirements. Concerts at the Boiler Shop are from a wide variety of genres; in 2026 acts have included The Twilight Sad, The Cribs, Kiefer Sutherland, Kneecap and Fatboy Slim.

In 2017 the BBC voted the venue one of "the 10 most beautiful gig venues in the UK". In 2026 Time Out included it on their list of "The 42 greatest independent music venues in the UK" describing it as "one of the most dramatic live music spaces in the country; a vast, 1,000-cap warehouse crowned with wood-and-steel beams and flooded with light from the floor-to-ceiling windows".

== Other events and facilities ==
As well as hire for conferences and other events, the Boiler Shop also hosts weddings, with a maximum capacity of 400 people. On evenings without live music, the Boiler Shop is also a regular venue for Bongo's Bingo. It has also hosted the BBC New Comedy Awards.

== Gallery ==
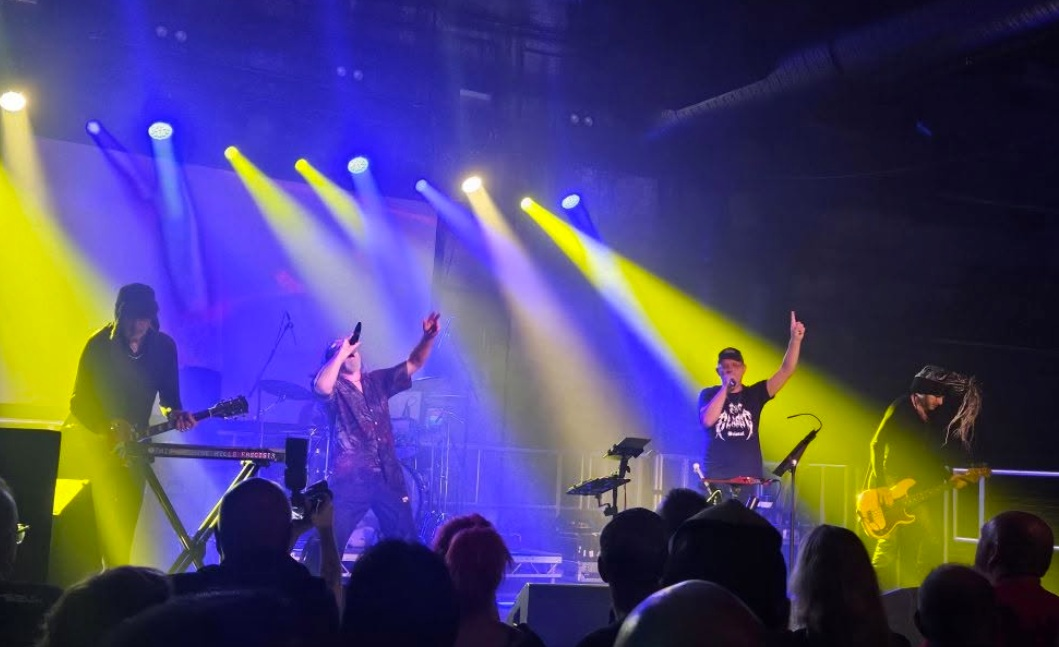
Pop Will Eat Itself playing in November 2025

An information poster in the Boiler Shop
