= LCDR Echo class =

The LCDR Echo class was a class of five steam locomotives, initially of the 4-2-0 wheel arrangement. They were designed by Thomas Russell Crampton for the London, Chatham and Dover Railway (LCDR) as "1st class fast passenger" locomotives.

During 1859–60 the LCDR board considered the need for new locomotives to operate lines then under construction. After consultation with various engineers, including Charles Patrick Stewart (of Sharp, Stewart and Company), Robert Sinclair (of the Eastern Counties Railway) and Crampton, they decided upon forty new locomotives: eight 1st class fast locomotives, seventeen general purpose passenger locomotives, and fifteen goods locomotives. After discussion with William Martley, the quantities needed for the two passenger types were revised to five and 24 respectively. Tenders were sought, and these were considered in July 1860, when orders were placed with several firms for what were to become the Echo, Tiger and Acis classes.

The Echo class were ordered from the firm of Robert Stephenson & Co. at a price of £3,400 each. As with the Tiger and Acis classes, the locomotives were equipped with the Cudworth coal-burning firebox. They were delivered to the LCDR between March and May 1862. During 1863–64, the locomotives were rebuilt to the 4-4-0 wheel arrangement.

Like other LCDR locomotives delivered prior to 1874, the locomotives had no numbers at first, being distinguished by name. In November 1875, William Kirtley (who had replaced Martley following the latter's death in 1874) allotted the class letter K. The locomotives were then given the numbers 27–31. One was withdrawn in 1896, but four lasted long enough to enter South Eastern and Chatham Railway (SECR) stock when the SECR was formed at the start of 1899. Their numbers were to be increased by 459 to avoid duplication with former South Eastern Railway locomotives, but before this was done, one more had been withdrawn. Accordingly, three became SECR nos. 487, 488 and 490, but soon after, the numbers of the first two were needed for new construction, so they were transferred to the duplicate list and had their SECR numbers suffixed with the letter A. The last one was withdrawn in August 1906.

Name	Works no.	Built	Rebuilt	LCDR Number	SECR Number	Withdrawn
Coquette	1381	April 1862	October 1863	28	487; 487A from August 1902	August 1906
Echo	1382	March 1862	May 1863	27	(486)	July 1901
Flora	1383	April 1862	December 1863	29	488; 488A from September 1902	July 1903
Flirt	1384	May 1862	January 1864	30	–	November 1896
Sylph	1385	May 1862	February 1864	31	490	October 1902
