= SER 235 class =

Class of steam locomotives

235 class Class J
Type and origin
- Power type: Steam
- Designer: James I. Cudworth
- Builder: Brassey & Co
- Build date: 1866
Specifications
- Configuration
  - Whyte: 0-4-4WT
- Driver dia.: 5 ft 7 in (1.70 m)
- Trailing dia.: 3 ft 8 in (1.12 m)
- Wheelbase: 20 ft 6 in (6.25 m)
- Loco weight: 34.65 long tons (35.21 t)
- Fuel type: Coke
- Fuel capacity: 1.25 long tons (1,270 kg)
- Water cap.: 850 imp gal (3,900 L)
- Firebox
  - Grate area: 10.5 sq ft (0.98 m^{2})
- Boiler pressure: 130 psi (0.90 MPa)
- Heating surface: 903 sq ft (83.9 m^{2})
- Cylinders: Two, inside
- Cylinder size: 15 in × 20 in (380 mm × 510 mm)
Career
- Operators: South Eastern Railway
- Number in class: 7
- Numbers: 235–241
- Delivered: July–August 1866
- Withdrawn: June 1887–June 1893
- Disposition: All scrapped

The SER 235 class was a class of 0-4-4T steam locomotives on the South Eastern Railway. Introduced in 1866, they were the first locomotives of this wheel arrangement to be built for an English railway.

== History ==
Until 1864 the South Eastern Railway had very few tank locomotives. In that year the 205 class 0-4-2T locomotives were introduced, for use on the London suburban passenger services. They were designed by James I. Cudworth, the company's locomotive superintendent. They performed well, but their capabilities were restricted by their small fuel and water capacities, so after twelve were built, Cudworth produced an enlarged version of the design.

With the fuel capacity raised from 0.75 long tons (760 kg) to 1.25 long tons (1,270 kg) and the water capacity raised from 690 imperial gallons (3,100 L) to 850 imp gal (3,900 L), the extra weight and length needed behind the cab required adding an extra trailing axle, producing an 0-4-4T - the first of that wheel arrangement to be built for an English railway (the first Scottish railway to use the 0-4-4T wheel arrangement was the Caledonian Railway, in 1873). There were compensating levers to equalise the weight between the coupled axles, and the outside-framed bogie also had compensating levers; it carried about a third of the locomotive's weight. Like the 205 class, they burned coke for fuel.

At first, they were mainly used on services to Greenwich. Only one batch (of seven) was built in 1866; there were troubles with the bogie, and so when more were required Cudworth once more used the 0-4-2T type, producing the 73 class. However, the 235 class continued to be used and all were given new boilers between 1877 and 1883. Under Stirling's locomotive classification scheme of September 1879, they formed Class J. They were withdrawn and scrapped between 1887 and 1893.
