= LCDR Brigand class =

Brigand class
Type and origin
- Power type: Steam
- Designer: Patrick Stirling
- Builder: Sharp, Stewart & Co.
- Order number: E371
- Serial number: 1268 and 1269
- Total produced: 2
- Rebuild date: 1884 and 1890
Specifications
- Configuration
  - Whyte: 0-4-2
- Gauge: 1,435 mm (4 ft 8 1/2 in)
- Coupled dia.: 5 ft 0 in (1.524 m)
- Trailing dia.: 3 ft 6 in (1.07 m)
- Firebox
  - Grate area: 13.3 sq ft (1.24 m^{2})
- Boiler
  - Diameter: 4 ft 0 3/4 in (1.238 m)
  - Tube plates: 9 ft 8 in (2.946 m)
- Boiler pressure: 120 lbf/in^{2} (830 kPa; 8.4 kgf/cm^{2})
- Cylinders: Two, inside
- Cylinder size: 16 in × 22 in (406 mm × 559 mm)
Career
- Operators: London, Chatham and Dover Railway; South Eastern and Chatham Railway
- Class: Brigand, O
- Numbers: 1 and 2 (LCDR); 460 and 461 (SECR)
- Delivered: August 1861
- Withdrawn: May 1903

The LCDR Brigand class was a pair of steam locomotives of the 0-4-2 wheel arrangement supplied to the London, Chatham and Dover Railway (LCDR). They were designed by Patrick Stirling for the Glasgow and South Western Railway (GSWR), which ordered twenty in 1860 from Sharp, Stewart & Co. (order no. E371). At this time, the LCDR needed more locomotives but had little money available, so their locomotive superintendent, William Martley, visited various manufacturers to find out what was available quickly and cheaply. He arranged for two of the locomotives ordered by the GSWR to be delivered instead to the LCDR – they arrived in August 1861, two more being ordered from Sharp, Stewart for the GSWR as replacements (order no. E416).

Like other LCDR locomotives delivered prior to 1874, the locomotives originally had no numbers, being distinguished by name. In November 1875, William Kirtley (who had replaced Martley following the latter's death in 1874) allotted the class letter O. The locomotives were then given the numbers 1 and 2. In 1884, no. 2 was rebuilt with a new boiler; no. 1 was similarly treated in 1890. They passed to the South Eastern and Chatham Railway (SECR) at the start of 1899, and their numbers were increased by 459 to avoid duplication with former South Eastern Railway locomotives. Both were withdrawn from service in May 1903.

Name	Works no.	Delivered	LCDR Number	Reboilered	SECR Number	Withdrawn
Corsair	1268	August 1861	2	June 1884	461	May 1903
Brigand	1269	August 1861	1	June 1890	460	May 1903

Before joining the LCDR, Martley had worked for the Great Western Railway (GWR); and the names for these two locomotives were taken from the first two of the GWR Bogie Class.
