= LB&SCR B1 class =

Class of British steam locomotives

LB&SCR B1 Class
- No. 173 Cottesloe at East Croydon in 1895
Type and origin
- Power type: Steam
- Designer: William Stroudley
- Builder: Brighton Works
- Build date: 1882–1891
- Total produced: 36
Specifications
- Configuration
  - Whyte: 0-4-2
  - UIC: B1 n2
- Gauge: 4 ft 8 1/2 in (1,435 mm) standard gauge
- Driver dia.: 6 ft 6 in (1.981 m)
- Trailing dia.: 4 ft 6 in (1.372 m)
- Wheelbase: 15 ft 7 in (4.75 m)
- Loco weight: 38.7 long tons (39.3 t; 43.3 short tons)
- Fuel type: Coal
- Water cap.: 2,238 imp gal (10,170 L; 2,688 US gal)
- Boiler pressure: Pre 1889 engines: 140 psi (0.97 MPa); Post 1889 engines: 150 psi (1.03 MPa)
- Cylinders: Two, inside
- Cylinder size: 18 1/4 in × 26 in (464 mm × 660 mm)
Performance figures
- Tractive effort: 14,155 lbf (62.96 kN)
Career
- Class: B1
- Retired: 1910–12 (10); 1925–33 (26)
- Preserved: No. 214 Gladstone
- Disposition: One preserved, remainder scrapped

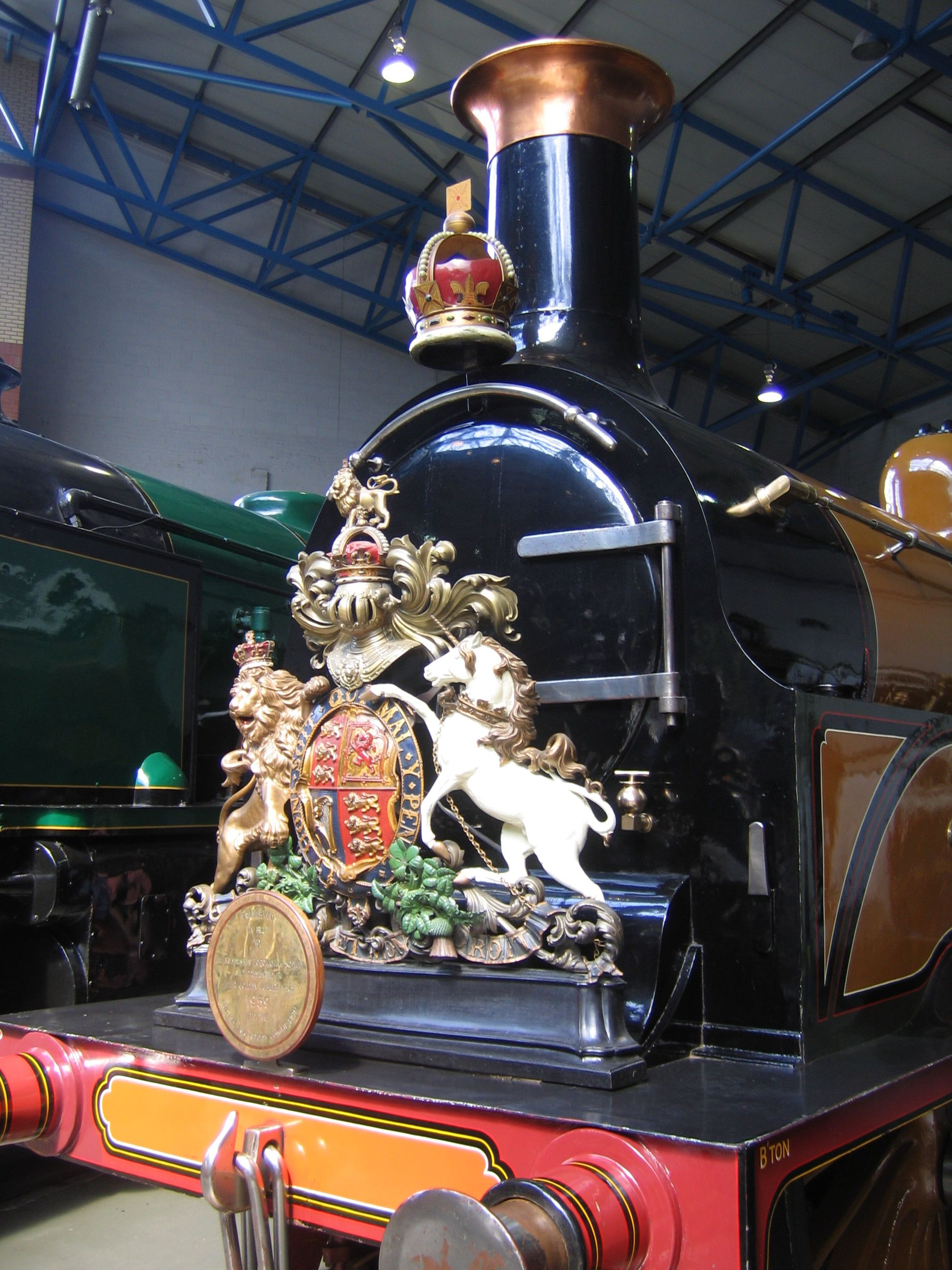
B1 class Gladstone at the National Railway Museum, York, decorated as it was for Diamond Jubilee of Queen Victoria in 1897

The London, Brighton and South Coast Railway B1 Class is a class of 0-4-2 express passenger steam locomotives, known from the name of the first, No. 214, as the "Gladstones".

== History ==
They were the last express passenger design of William Stroudley, and were a larger and improved version of his Richmond class of 1878. Thirty-six locomotives were turned out from Brighton railway works between 1882 and 1891, and were used for the heaviest London to Brighton express trains. All were named after politicians, men associated with the railway, or places served by the railway. In 1889 No.189 Edward Blount was exhibited at the 1889 Paris Exhibition and received a gold medal.

The locomotives were originally designated "Class B" together with the "Richmond Class" but were later designated B1 class by D. E. Marsh.

During the first decade of the twentieth century the class were gradually replaced by Billinton B4 class locomotives and were transferred to secondary duties. Withdrawal began in April 1910, and by the outbreak of the First World War ten had been scrapped.

== Southern Railway ==
The remaining twenty-six locomotives passed to the Southern Railway in 1923, but withdrawals recommenced in 1926 and the last survivor (No. 172) was withdrawn in 1933.

== Accidents and incidents ==
- On 1 May 1891, locomotive No. 175 Hayling was hauling a passenger train which was derailed at Norwood Junction, Surrey when a cast-iron bridge collapsed as the train was passing over it.

== Preservation ==
The first of the class, 214 Gladstone, was preserved as a static exhibit thanks to the efforts of the Stephenson Locomotive Society and is normally on display in the National Railway Museum, York. Gladstone is the only ex LB&SCR tender locomotive to be preserved, as all the other preserved locomotives (ten A1/A1x "Terriers", one E1, and an E4) are tank engines.
