= William Stroudley =

English railway engineer

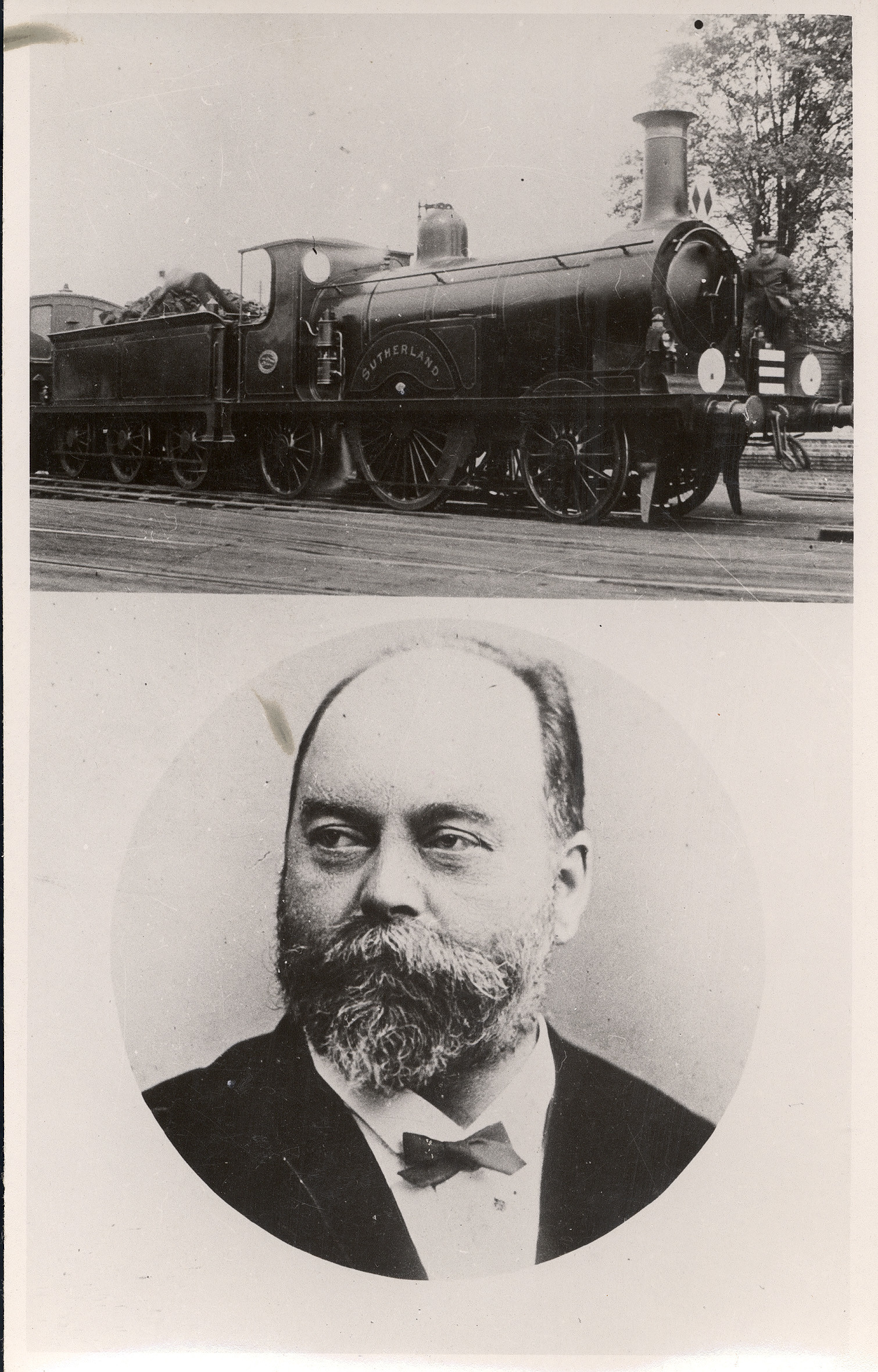
- A postcard of William Stroudley and one of his G class 2-2-2
- Born: 6 March 1833; Sandford-on-Thames, Oxfordshire, England
- Died: 20 December 1889 (aged 56); Paris, France
- Resting place: Extra Mural Cemetery, Brighton
- Engineering career
- Discipline: Locomotive engineer
- Significant design: LB&SCR A1 and B1 classes

William Stroudley (6 March 1833 – 20 December 1889) was an English railway engineer, and was one of the most famous steam locomotive engineers of the nineteenth century, working principally for the London, Brighton and South Coast Railway (LB&SCR). He designed some of the most famous and longest-lived steam locomotives of his era, several of which have been preserved.

== Early career ==
Born at Sandford-on-Thames, Oxfordshire, William Stroudley began work in 1847 at the local paper mill and in the same year he was apprenticed to John Inshaw's engineering firm in Birmingham. Over the next seven years he gained a variety of engineering experience on stationary engines and steam barges. From 1854 he trained as a locomotive engineer at Swindon Works under Daniel Gooch of the Great Western Railway, but soon moved to the Great Northern Railway under Charles Sacré at their Peterborough workshops, later becoming running foreman at the motive power depot there. In 1861 he was appointed manager of the Edinburgh and Glasgow Railway Cowlairs Works. On 19 June 1865 he was appointed locomotive and carriage superintendent of the Highland Railway at Inverness. He was unable to do any substantial work as the railway had very little money at the time, only producing one locomotive. He was however able to re-organise and modernise the company's Lochgorm Works and reduced the operating costs for the railway's existing fleet.

== LB&SCR career ==
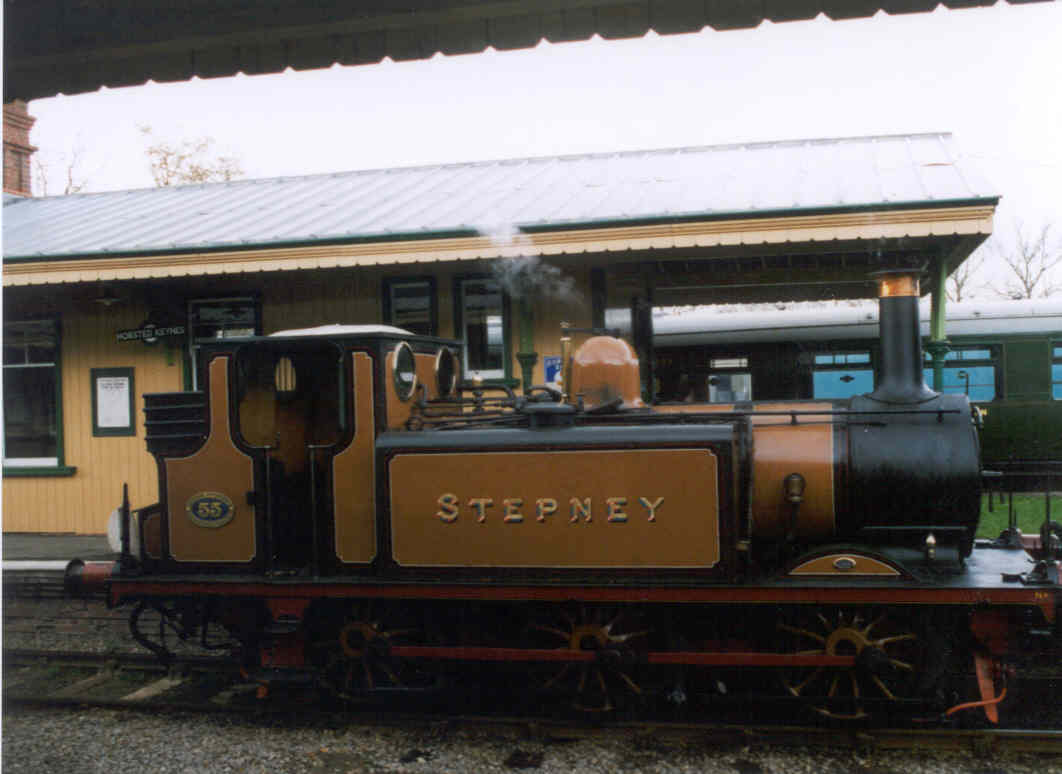
A1 class Stepney on the Bluebell Railway

In 1870 he was appointed locomotive superintendent of the London, Brighton and South Coast Railway (LB&SCR) at Brighton works following the enforced resignation of J. C. Craven. When he took office there were seventy-two different classes of locomotive in use and so there was an urgent need for standardisation to reduce operating costs. Stroudley was hampered at first by the difficult financial state of his new company, which had faced bankruptcy in 1866. However, during the 1870s and 1880s increased revenues, particularly from the growth of suburban traffic, enabled him to dramatically improve the performance and reliability of the locomotive stock by introducing a number of very successful standard classes.

=== Locomotive classes ===
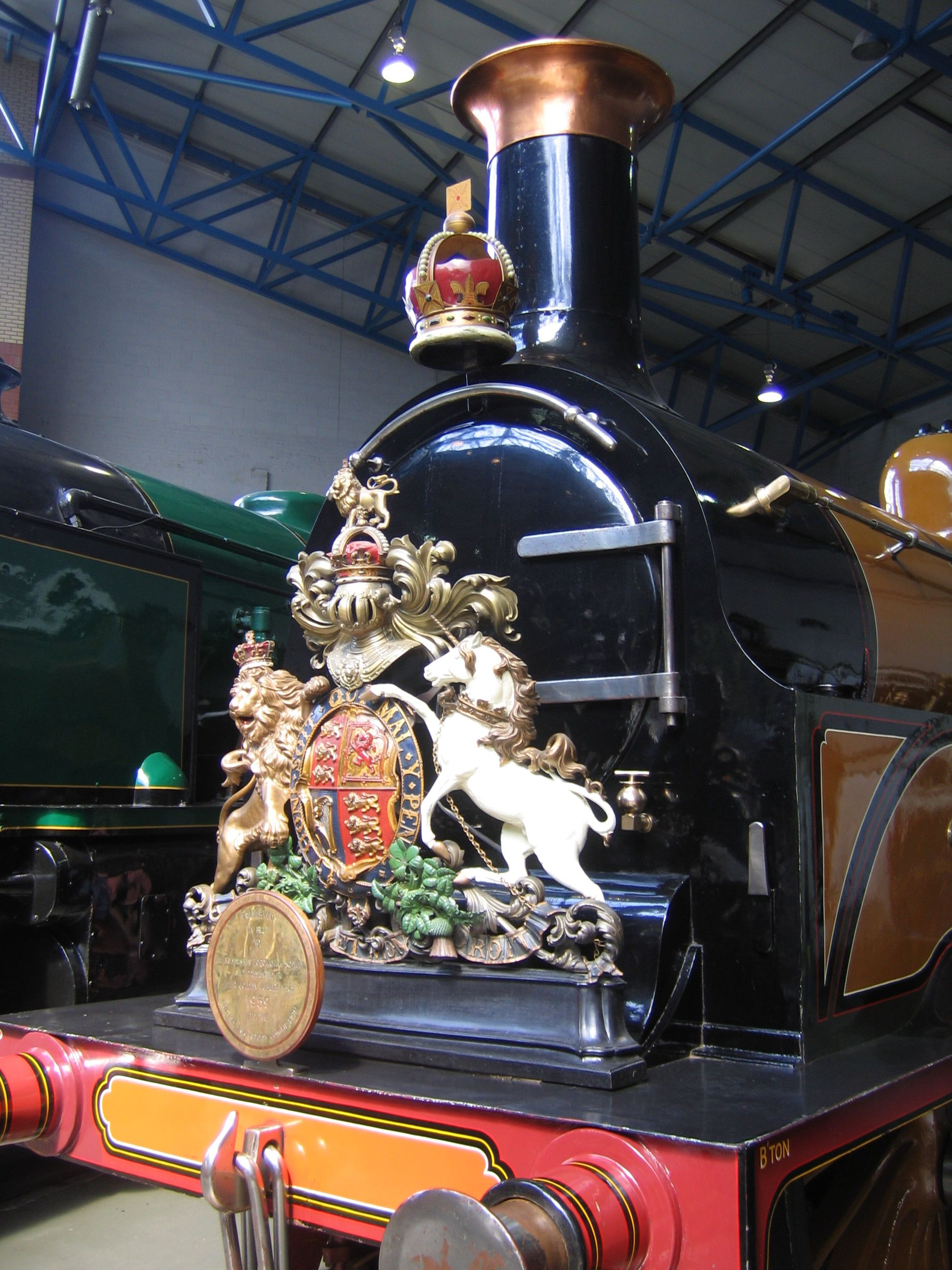
B1 class Gladstone at the National Railway Museum, York, decorated as it was for the Diamond Jubilee of Queen Victoria in 1897

Stroudley's first passenger locomotive design at Brighton was the two locomotives of the "Belgravia class", 2-4-0 in 1872. They were very similar to two 2-4-0 locomotives constructed at Cowlairs for the Edinburgh and Glasgow Railway in the early 1860s when he was the works manager. They contained many features of his later designs.

In the same year he introduced the first of three important tank engine classes, which were ultimately produced in large numbers. The diminutive LB&SCR A1 Class (Terrier) 0-6-0 tanks were introduced in 1872 and a number were still in active use in the 1960s; several have been preserved. The D1 class 0-4-2T were used for London suburban services of the LBSCR from 1873 until electrification, and some survivors lasted until the early 1950s. The last survivor of the E1 class freight 0-6-0T was withdrawn in 1962, while a previously withdrawn example now preserved.

In 1874, Stroudley also designed the G class of powerful 2-2-2 'singles', the last of which survived until 1914. Less successful were his 0-6-0 C and C1 freight classes of 1871 and 1882 respectively, both of which were underpowered.

Stroudley is best remembered for his 0-4-2 passenger classes. The first of these was a tender engine version of the D1 class, the D2 or "Lyons" class, introduced in 1876 and which proved to be very successful. A larger version for express passenger work, the "Richmond class", was introduced in 1877. However it is the enlarged B1 class ("Gladstone class") express engines of 1882 for which he is best remembered, the last of which survived until 1933. The first member of this class is preserved at the National Railway Museum in York.

=== Other engineering activities ===
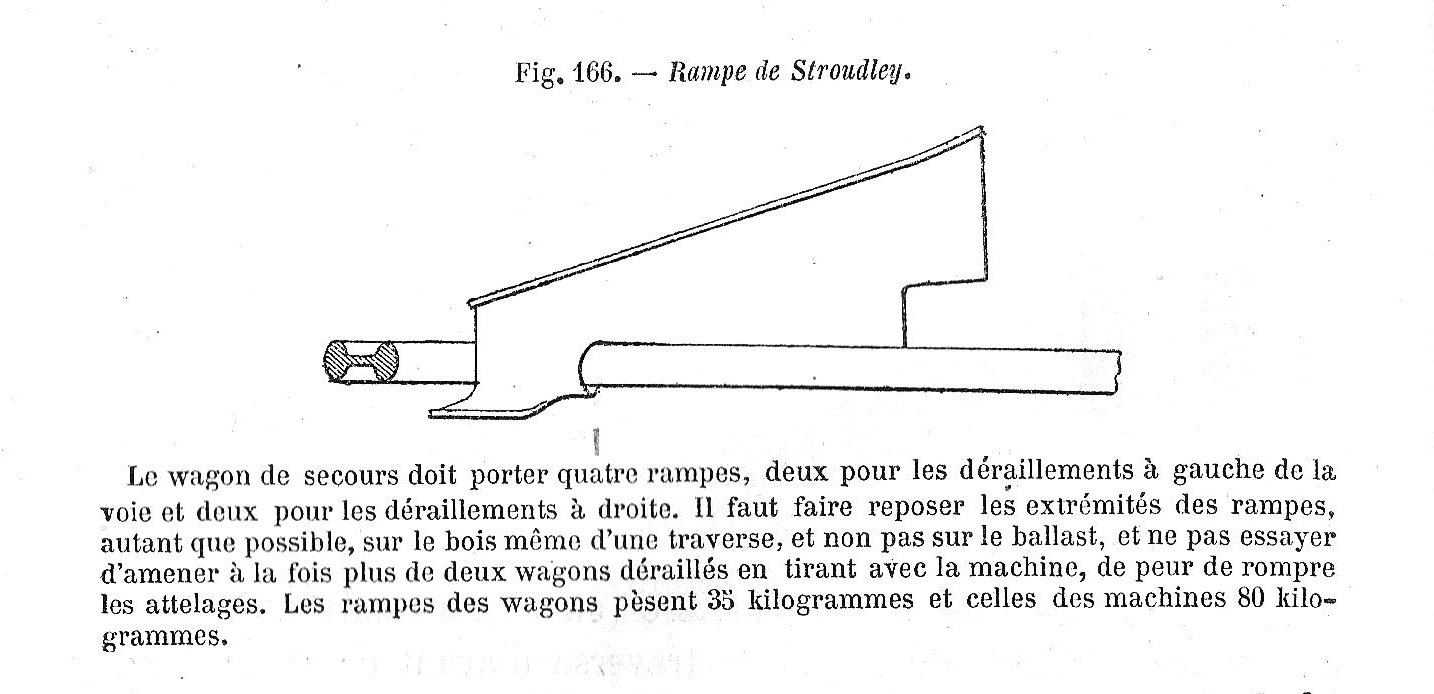
Plan view of re-railing ramp: "The rescue wagon must carry four ramps, two for derailments on the left and two for those on the right. It is necessary, wherever possible, to place the edges of the ramps on the actual sleepers rather than the ballast, and do not try to draw more than two wagons at a time, for fear of breakages. Ramps for wagons weigh 35 kilos and those for engines 80 kilos."

Stroudley was responsible for the re-organisation and modernisation of Brighton railway works and the repair facilities at New Cross. He also designed railway carriages and the steam engines for the LB&SCR cross-channel ferries which operated between Newhaven and Dieppe.

He is also remembered for inventing the re-railing ramps that are still known as "Stroudley's Patent Ramps" or "Rampes de Stroudley" in some parts of the world.

== Death ==
He died of acute bronchitis on 20 December 1889 during his visit to the Paris Exhibition where he was exhibiting one of his locomotives. Stroudley was buried in the Extra Mural Cemetery, Brighton on 24 December 1889. He was succeeded at Brighton by R. J. Billinton.

Business positions
Preceded by William Barclay	Locomotive and Carriage Superintendent of the Highland Railway; 1866–1870	Succeeded by David Jones
Preceded by John Chester Craven	Locomotive and Carriage Superintendent of the London, Brighton and South Coast Railway; 1870–1889	Succeeded by R. J. Billinton
