= LB&SCR D2 class =

Class of British steam locomotives

London Brighton and South Coast Railway Class D2
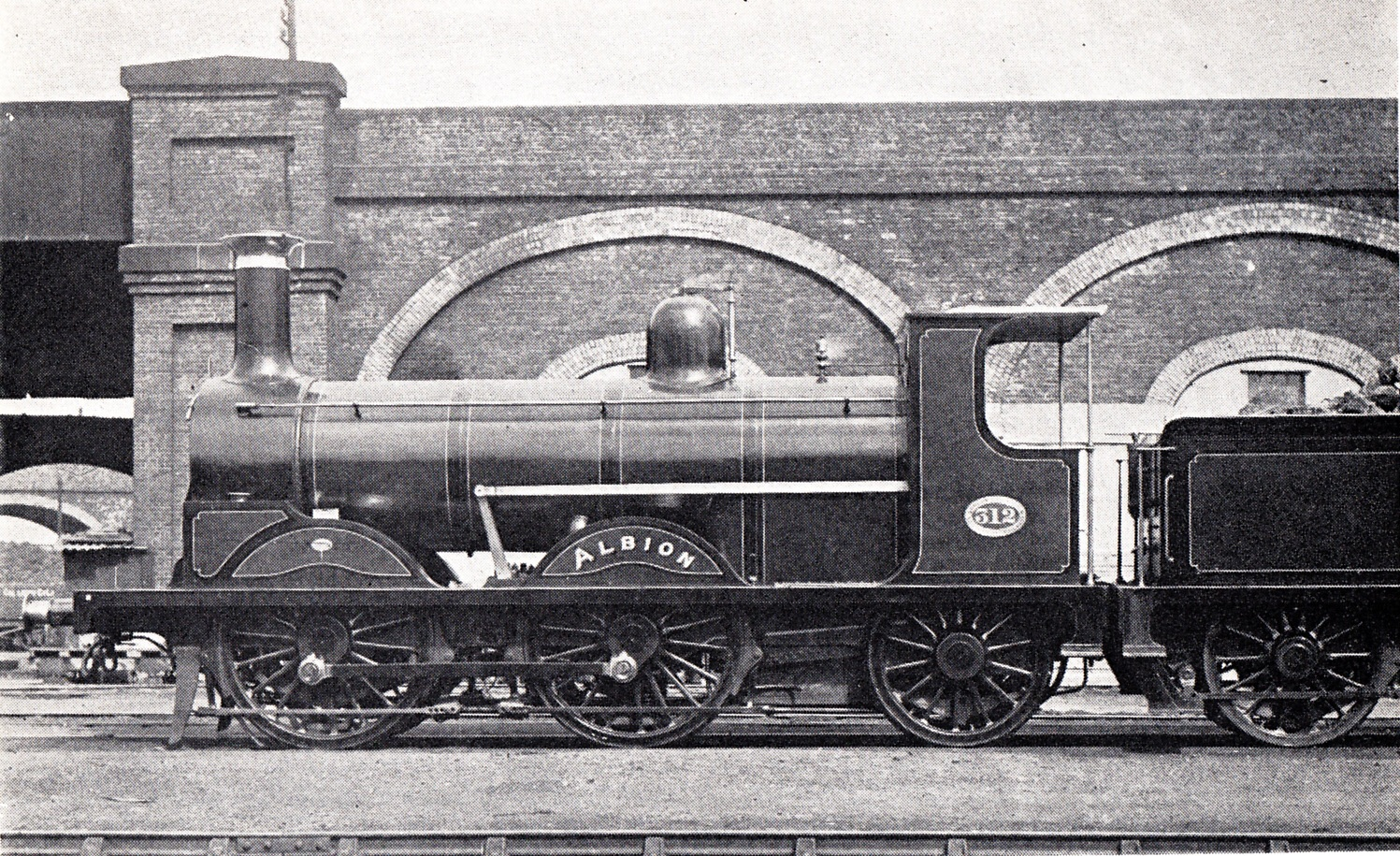
- D2 No.312 Albion c. 1880
Type and origin
- Power type: Steam
- Designer: William Stroudley
- Builder: Brighton Works
- Build date: 1876–1883
- Total produced: 14
Specifications
- Configuration
  - Whyte: 0-4-2
- Gauge: 4 ft 8 1/2 in (1,435 mm) standard gauge
- Driver dia.: 5 ft 6 in (1.676 m)
- Loco weight: 34 long tons 6 cwt (34.9 t; 38.4 short tons) (76,800 lb or 34,800 kg)
- Boiler pressure: 140 psi (0.97 MPa)
- Cylinders: Two
- Cylinder size: 17 in × 24 in (432 mm × 610 mm)
Performance figures
- Tractive effort: 12,506 lbf (55.6 kN)
Career
- Operators: London Brighton and South Coast Railway
- Class: D2
- Numbers: 300–313
- Locale: Great Britain
- First run: 1876
- Withdrawn: 1902–1907
- Disposition: All scrapped

The LB&SCR D2 class, 0-4-2 suburban passenger locomotives, were designed by William Stroudley of the London Brighton and South Coast Railway in 1876. They were developed from his successful "D-tank" class of 1873.

== Pre-Grouping ==
The 14 locomotives in this class were built at Brighton railway works and appeared in traffic between September 1876 and October 1883, intended for those duties where the limited water supply of a "D-tank" might prove to be a handicap. They were frequently employed on lightly loaded fast continental boat trains between London and Newhaven, and so were named after European cities. Thus they were frequently known as the "Lyons Class", after the first locomotive No.300 Lyons.

The class performed well for a quarter of a century, and achieved good mileages but when they began to require major repairs, it was decided to withdraw the class and use the newer B2 and C2 class locomotives in their place. The first two locomotives were withdrawn in November 1902 and the final two in March 1907. No examples survived into preservation.

== Locomotive summary ==
D2 class locomotive fleet summary
First No.	Build date	Second No.	Date renumbered	Prev No.	LBSCR Name	Withdrawn
300	September 1876				Lyons	June 1903
301	March 1877				Caen	November 1902
302	January 1878				Turin	July 1904
303	January 1878				Milan	June 1903
304	December 1877				Nice	July 1904
305	December 1877				Genoa	December 1904
306	April 1878				Naples	December 1904
307	April 1878				Venice	November 1902
308	July 1883				Como	December 1904
309	July 1883	609	September 1906		Splugen	March 1907
310	July 1883				Laval	July 1906
311	July 1883				Rhone	January 1907
312	September 1883	612	March 1905		Albion	February 1907
313	October 1883	613	March 1905		Paris	March 1907

== Sources ==
- Bradley, D.L. (1972) The locomotives of the London, Brighton & South Coast Railway: Part 2, The Railway Correspondence and Travel Society, ISBN 0-901115-21-5
- Searle, David The London, Brighton & South Coast Railway https://web.archive.org/web/20080706131235/http://www.lbscr.demon.co.uk/locos/D2.html
