= Robert Stephenson and Company =

British locomotive manufacturer (1823–1937)

Robert Stephenson and Company Limited
- Industry: Locomotive manufacturing
- Founded: 1823; 203 years ago in Newcastle upon Tyne, England
- Founders: George Stephenson; Robert Stephenson; Edward Pease; Thomas Richardson
- Defunct: 1937
- Fate: Merged with Hawthorn Leslie
- Successor: Robert Stephenson and Hawthorns
- Headquarters: Darlington, England, United Kingdom

Robert Stephenson and Company was a locomotive manufacturing company founded in 1823 in Forth Street, Newcastle upon Tyne in England. It was the first company in the world created specifically to build railway engines.

Famous early locomotives were Locomotion No. 1 and Rocket. By 1899, 3,000 locomotives had been built at the Forth Street site, and a new company was formed, Robert Stephenson and Company Limited, and the Darlington works was opened.

In 1937, the company merged with Hawthorn Leslie to form Robert Stephenson and Hawthorns. In 1944, they became part of English Electric.

== Foundation and early success ==
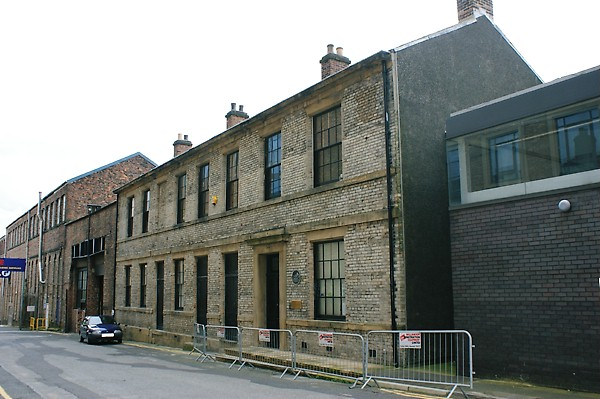
Works offices in South Street, Newcastle

The company was set up in 1823 in Forth Street, Newcastle upon Tyne in England by George Stephenson, his son Robert, with Edward Pease and Thomas Richardson. The manager of the works between 1824 and 1825 was James Kennedy.

The company's first engine was Locomotion No 1, which opened the Stockton and Darlington Railway, followed by three more: Hope, Black Diamond, and Diligence. Their vertical cylinders meant these locomotives rocked excessively and at the Hetton colliery railway Stephenson had introduced "steam springs" which had proved unsatisfactory. In 1828 he introduced the "Experiment" with inclined cylinders, which improved stability, and meant that it could be mounted on springs. Originally four wheeled, it was modified for six and another example, Victory, was built. Around this time, two locomotives were built for America. The first, a four coupled loco named America, was ordered by the Boston and Providence Rail Road. The second, six-coupled and named Whistler, was built for the Boston and Providence Railroad in 1833.

== The Rainhill Trials ==
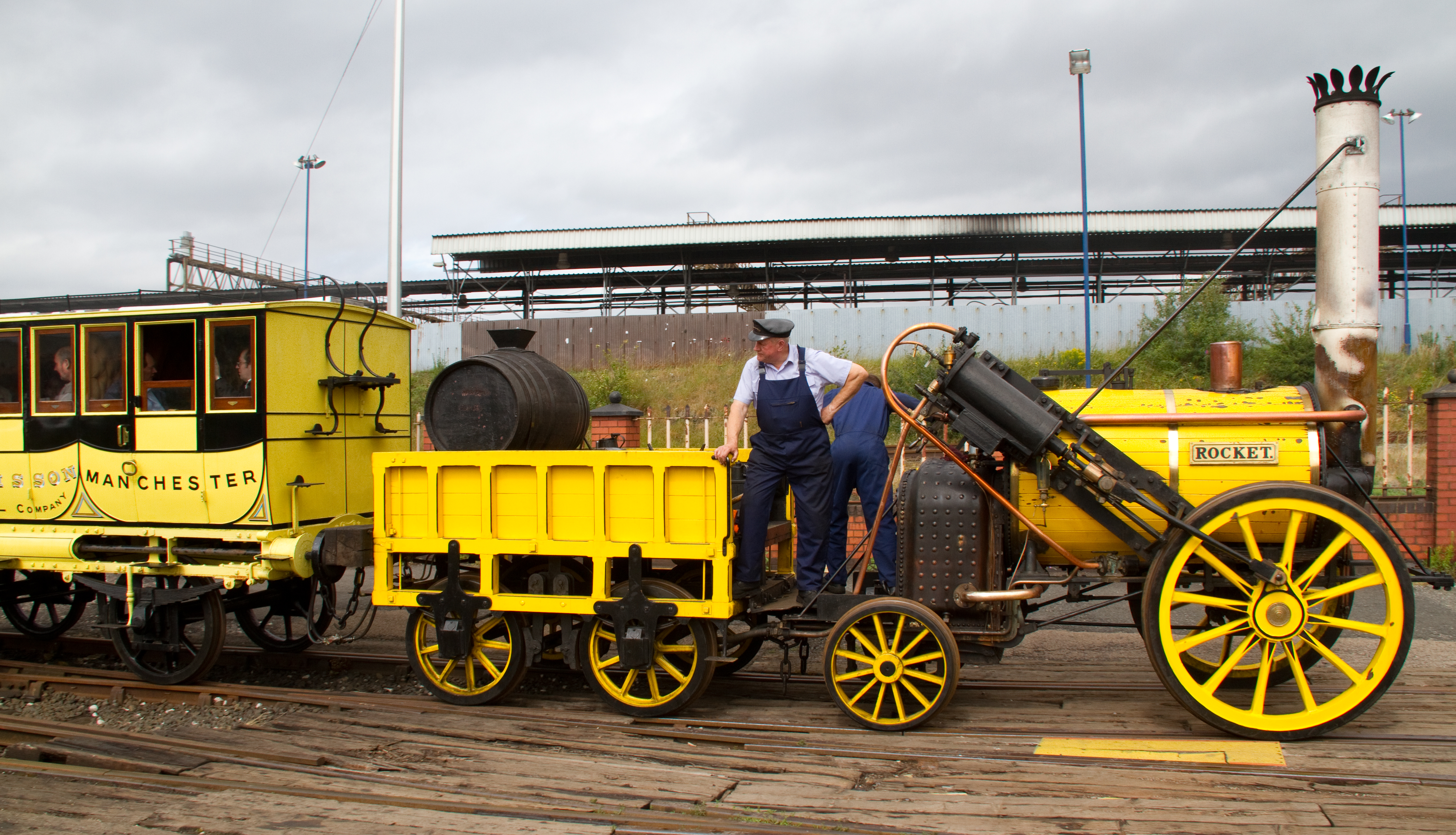
A modern replica of Rocket

In 1829, the company built a new, experimental locomotive to enter in the Rainhill Trials. Rocket had two notable improvements—a multi-tube boiler and a separate firebox. Rocket won the trials and convinced the directors of the Liverpool and Manchester Railway to use steam locomotives on their railway, and to order these locomotives, Rocket's cylinders were originally angled at an angle of 45 degrees, but were later moved to be horizontal.

The Invicta was the twentieth Robert Stephenson & Co. locomotive, and was built for the Canterbury and Whitstable Railway. Its cylinders were inclined, but moved to the front end. In 1830 came the Planet class with the cylinders inside the frames, followed by the Patentee, which added a pair of trailing wheels for greater stability with a larger boiler. This 2-2-2 design became the pattern for most locomotives, by a variety of manufacturers, for many years.

The locomotive John Bull, built in 1831, was originally of the Planet type, but was later modified. It survives and is now in the Smithsonian Institution's National Museum of American History in Washington, D.C., and is claimed to be the oldest still functional self-propelled vehicle.

== Long boiler designs ==
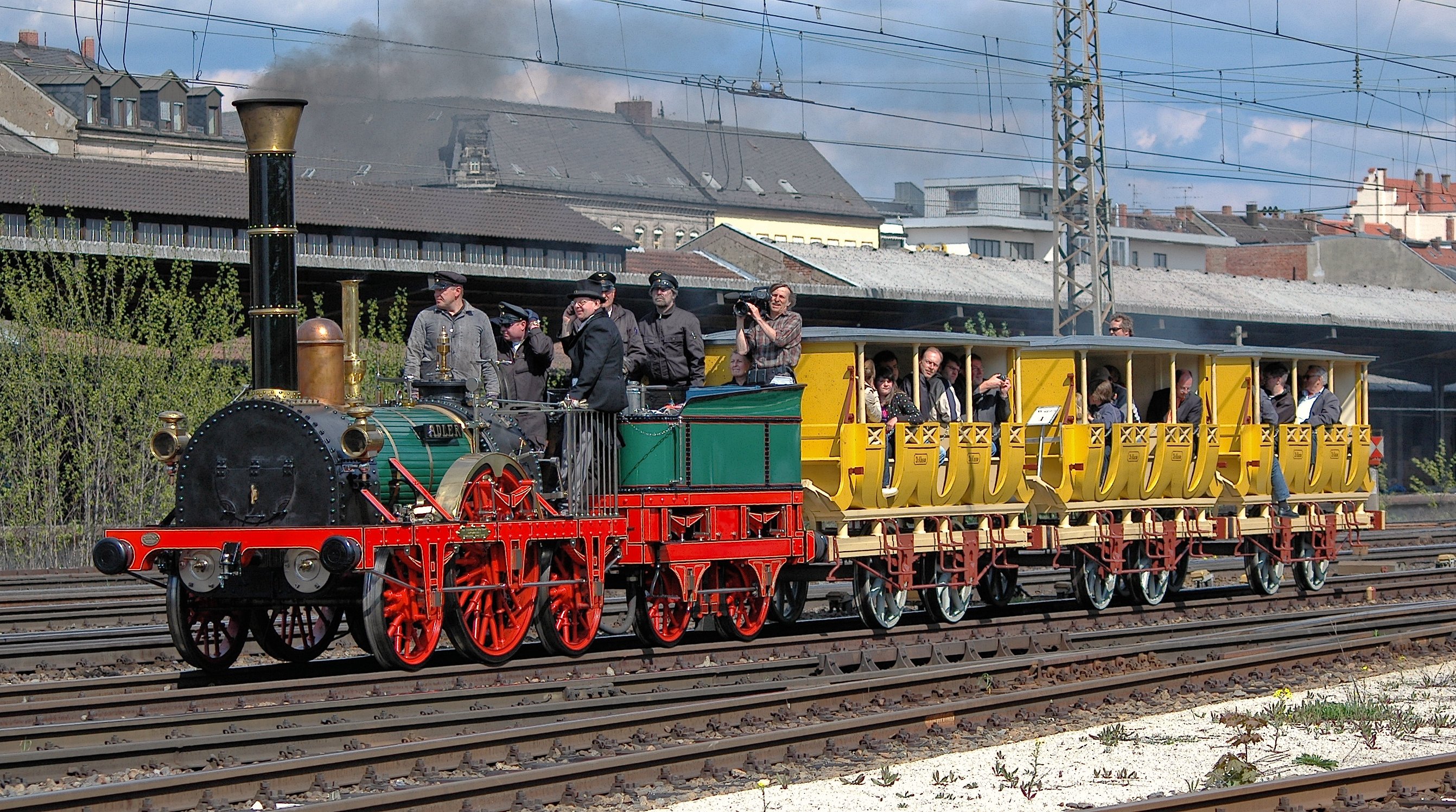
A modern replica of Adler, an example of the company's 2-2-2 design

The increased distance travelled by many trains highlighted corrosion problems on fireboxes and chimneys. With the co-operation of the North Midland Railway at their Derby works, Robert Stephenson measured the temperature of the exhaust gases, and decided to lengthen the boilers on future engines. Initially these "long-boiler" engines were 2-2-2 designs, but in 1844, Stephenson moved the trailing wheel to the front in 4-2-0 formation, so that the cylinders could be mounted between the supporting wheels. It was one of these, the "Great A" along with another from the North Midland Railway, which was compared with Brunel's "Ixion" in the gauge trials in 1846. In 1846 Stephenson added a pair of trailing wheels - the first with eight wheels. Another important innovation in 1842 was the Stephenson link motion.

== Crampton types ==
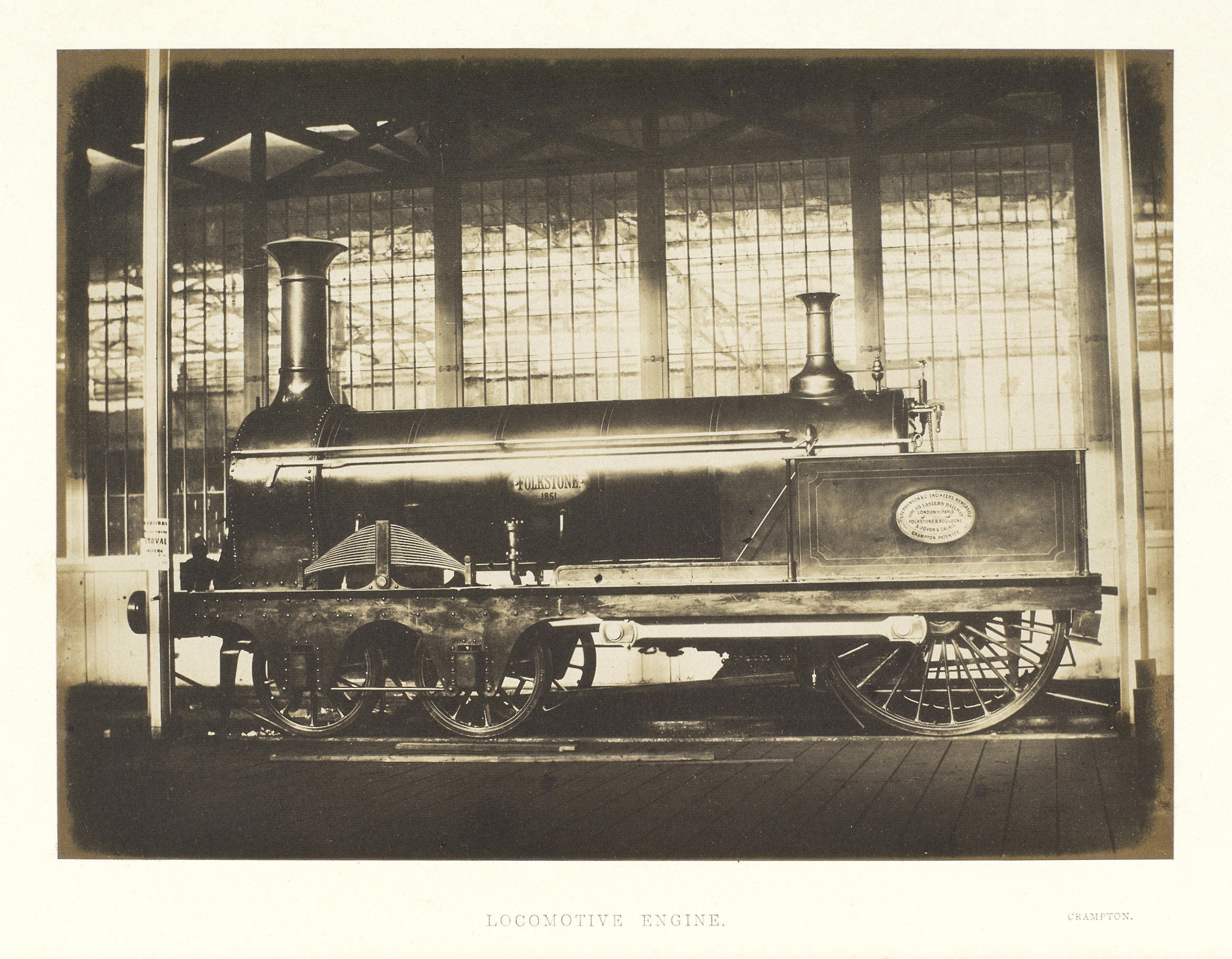
Folkstone, a Crampton type locomotive, in 1851

Robert Stephenson and Company built a number of Crampton type locomotives for the South Eastern Railway and the London, Chatham and Dover Railway. These were all of 4-2-0 wheel arrangement with inside cylinders and indirect drive. The inside cylinders drove a crankshaft located in front of the firebox and the crankshaft was coupled to the driving wheels by outside rods. They were unsuccessful on the LCDR, and the five Echo class locomotives were rebuilt as conventional 4-4-0 locomotives after only four years of service.

== Important exports of the 19th century ==
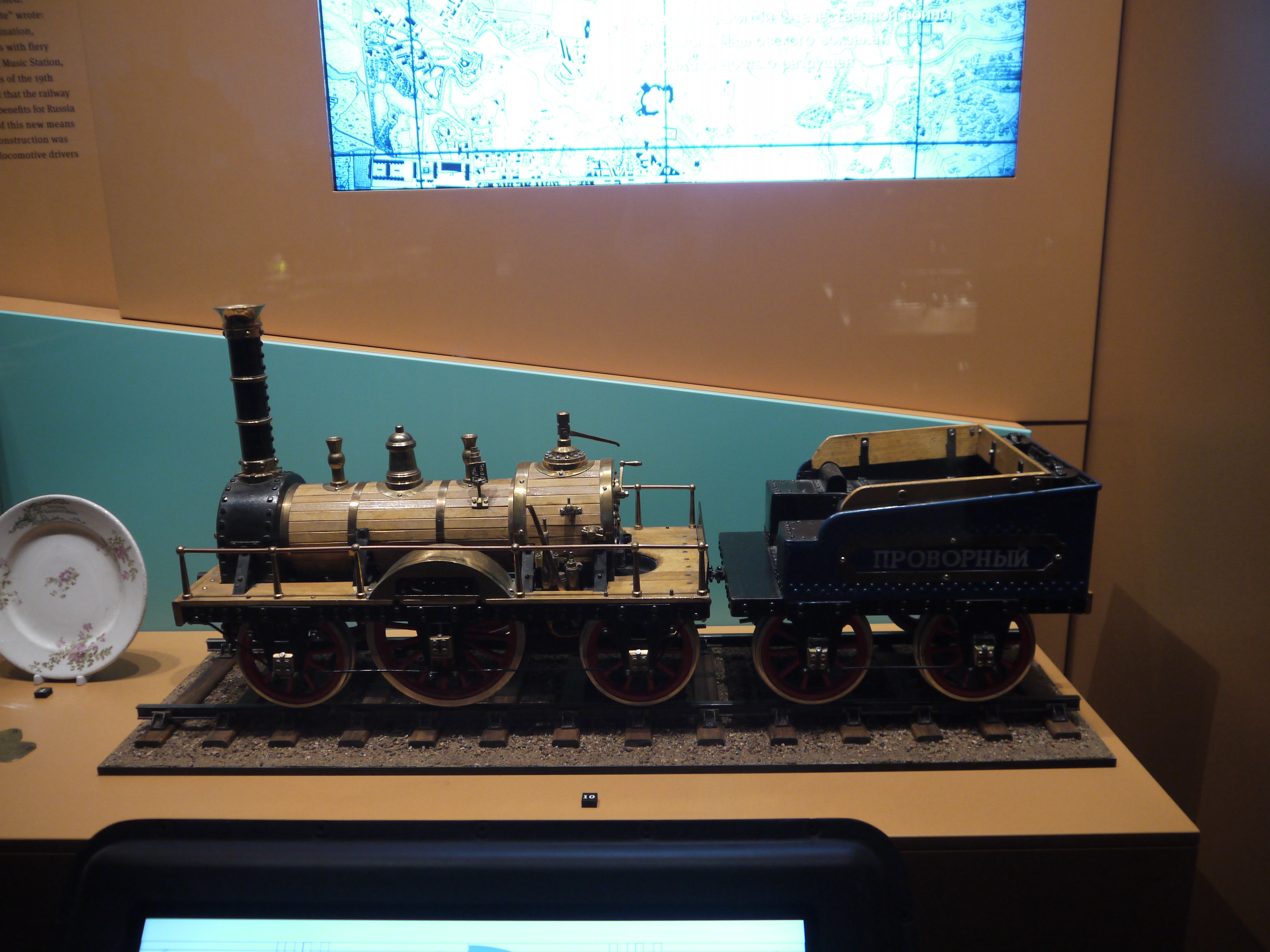
A model in the Russian Railway Museum of Russia's first main line passenger locomotive, built by the company for the Tsarskoye Selo Railway

The first public railway in Russia, the Tsarskoye Selo Railway, opened in 1837 using imported Stephenson locomotives.

The first railway proposal in Egypt came about when Pasha Muhammad Ali asked the British engineer T.H. Galloway to design a railway in 1834. Instructions to make it followed in 1836. Materials were delivered but little real construction followed. No Ottoman firwan (permission) was issued and the French objected. Progress was really made when in 1849 Muhammad Ali died, and in 1851 his grandson Abbas I of Egypt contracted Robert Stephenson to build Egypt's first standard gauge railway. The first section, between Alexandria on the Mediterranean coast and Kafr el-Zayyat on the Rosetta branch of the Nile was opened in 1854. This was the first railway in the Ottoman Empire as well as Africa and the Middle East. In the same year Abbas died and was succeeded by Sa'id Pasha, in whose reign the section between Kafr el-Zayyat and Cairo was completed in 1856 followed by an extension from Cairo to Suez in 1858. This completed the first modern transport link between the Mediterranean and the Indian Ocean, as Ferdinand de Lesseps did not complete the Suez Canal until 1869.

At Kafr el-Zayyat the line between Cairo and Alexandria originally crossed the Nile with an 80 ft (24 m) car float. This was the single largest project of the South Street Works. However, on 15 May 1858 a special train conveying Sa'id's heir presumptive Ahmad Rifaat Pasha fell off the float into the river drowned. Stephenson therefore replaced the car float with a swing bridge nearly 500 m (1,640 ft) long.

The Egyptian connections to Robert Stephenson were very considerable and a number of artefacts are in Cairo Railway Museum. This includes works number 1295 of 1862 whose artistic design was by Matthew Digby Wyatt. This lavish 2-2-4T built for the Egyptian Railways, called the Khedive's Train, is preserved in the Egyptian Railway Museum at Cairo.

== Shipbuilding ==
In the 1880s, the company purchased the Hebburn shipbuilding yard of Messrs. M'Intyre & Co. (Limited), which had closed after building four ships. The first ship they built, the Endeavour, was launched on 14 January 1888. At that time, they had contracts to build two lightships for Trinity House and another steamship for a London company.

== Into the 20th century ==
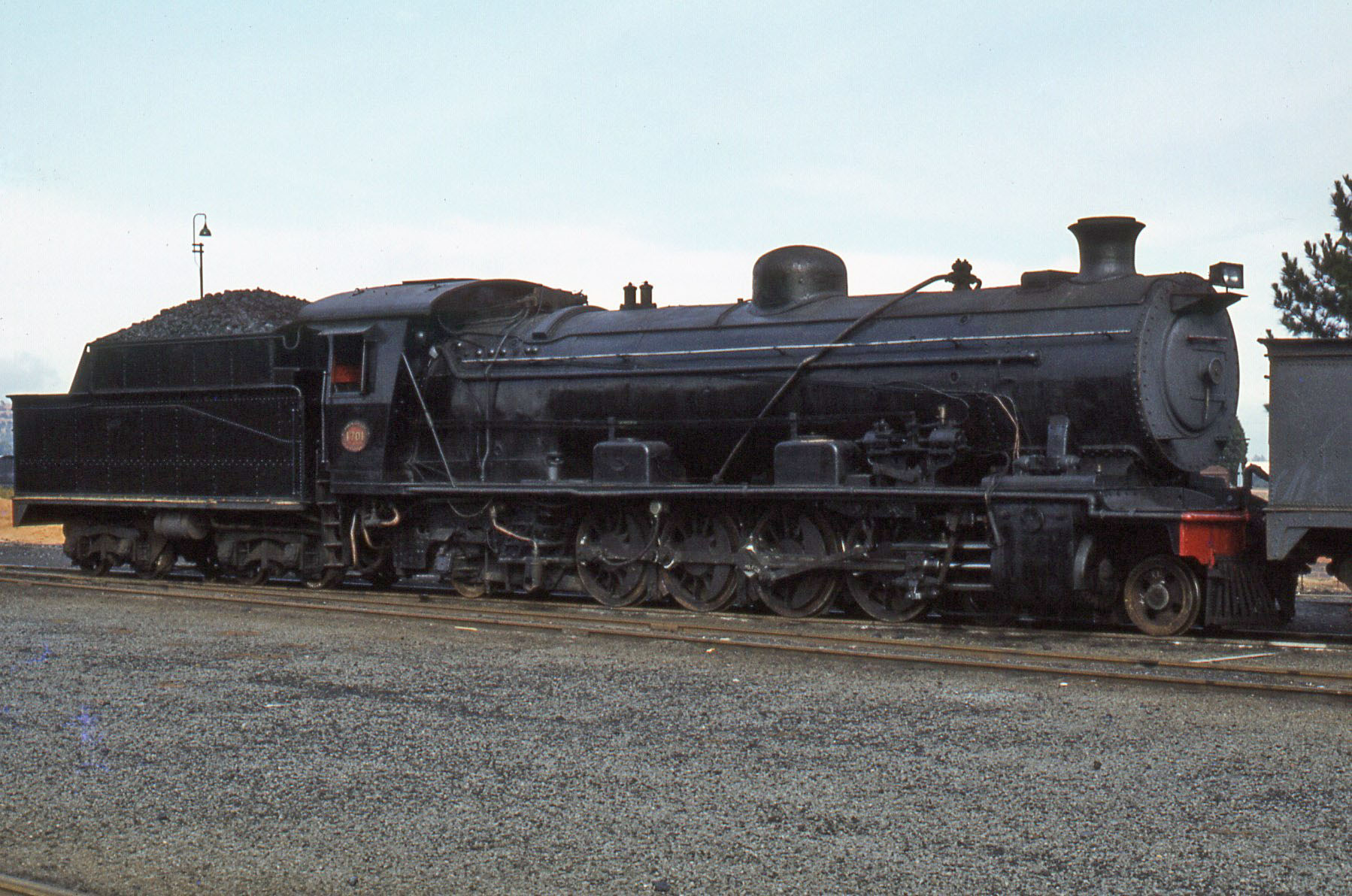
An example South African Class 14 4-8-2, built by the company during 1913–1915, as photographed in 1979

Over the remainder of the century, the company prospered in the face of increasing competition, supplying railways at home and abroad. By 1899, around 3,000 locomotives had been built and a new limited liability company was formed, Robert Stephenson and Company Limited and the works was moved to Darlington, the first locomotive leaving the shop in 1902.

Most railways in Britain were building their own rolling stock, so most of the output was for export, from 4-4-0's for the Oudh and Rohilkhand Railway to GS (4-6-0) and HS (2-8-0) classes for the Bengal Nagpur Railway. These preceded the slightly larger BESA standard designs for the Indian railways. The works built the first British 2-10-0 for the Argentine Great Western Railway in 1905.

In 1910, it sold the graving dock at Hebburn to Palmers Shipbuilding and Iron Company.

During World War I, the company devoted itself to munitions work. However, between 1917 and 1920, a large batch of ROD 2-8-0 and SNCV type 18 0-6-0 tram locomotives were ordered by the War Office for use on the continent. From then on, business was slack, for various reasons. Notable were thirty 2-6-0 mixed traffic locomotives for the GWR in 1921, a batch of thirty 0-6-0 tank engines for the LNER and five 7F 2-8-0s for the Somerset and Dorset Joint Railway. In 1936 and 1937, only forty six were built, including eleven B17 class ("Sandringham") 4-6-0s for the LNER, and seven 2-6-4 passenger tank locomotives for the South Indian Railway Company.

== Mergers and closure ==
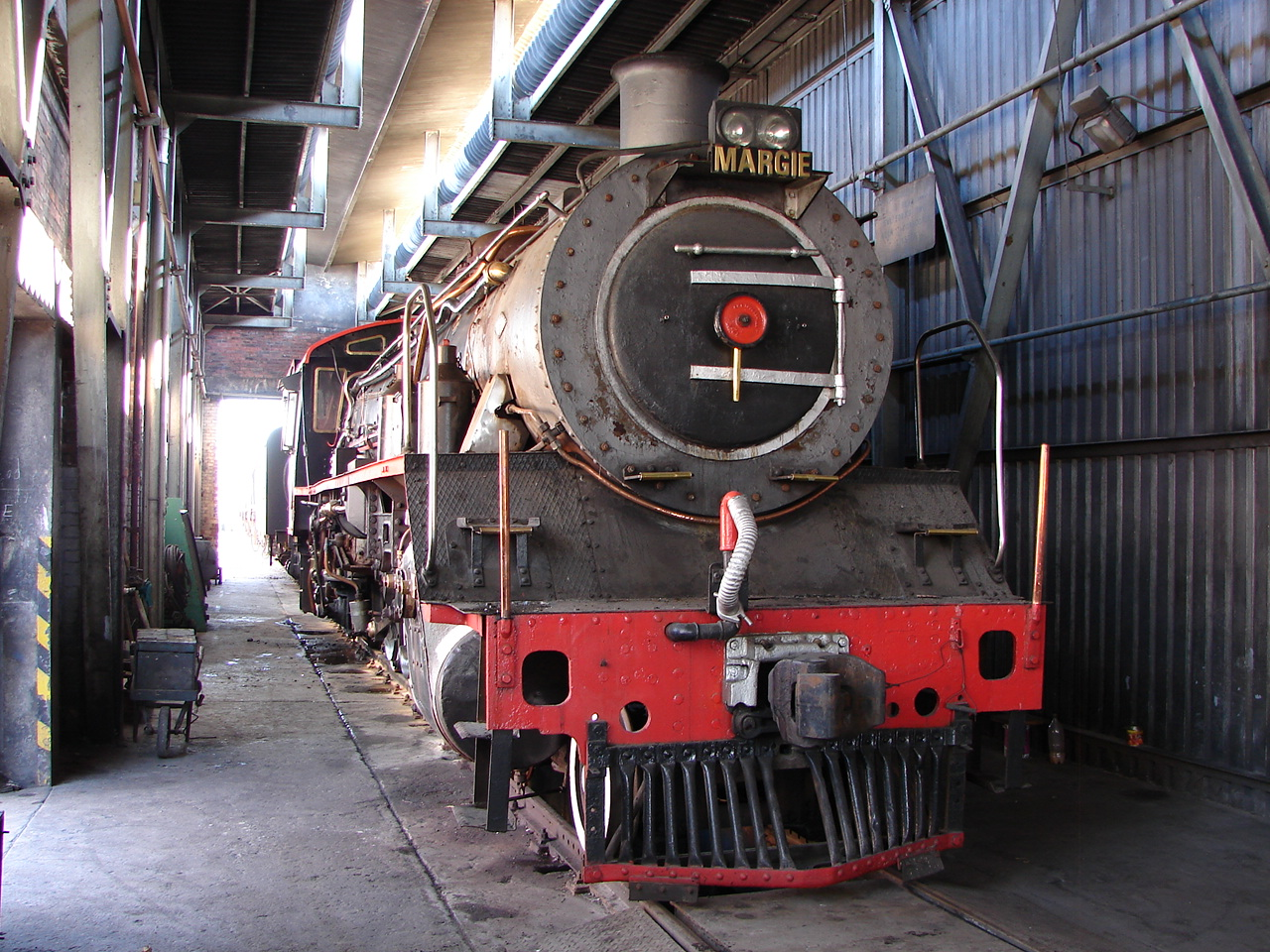
A South African Class 19D 4-8-2 built by the company, photographed in 2009

In 1937, the company merged with the locomotive interests of Hawthorn Leslie and Company to form Robert Stephenson and Hawthorns Limited. The company's shipbuilding activities continuing separately. Main line locomotives continued to be built at Darlington, while industrial engines were built at Hawthorne Leslie's works at Forth Bank, Newcastle. in 1938 the goodwill of the Kitson and Manning Wardle companies was bought.

During World War II, the plant was fully occupied building 0-4-0 and 0-6-0 saddle tanks for industrial use, although they did manufacture four PC class 4-6-2s for the Iraqi State Railways in 1940 (one of which was lost at sea en route). In 1943, ninety Austerity 0-6-0ST locomotives were built for the War Department.

In 1944, the Vulcan Foundry, which had been formed by Robert Stephenson and Charles Tayleur in 1830, acquired a substantial stock holding, and they became part of the English Electric Company. The bulk of the output was for export or industrial use, including fifty South African Class 19D 4-8-2s, Indian YB, YL and WM classes, and ten M class 4-6-2s for the Tasmanian Government Railways. Domestic mainline locomotives included thirty five Class L1 2-6-4T for the Eastern Region of British Railways and 100 9400 class 0-6-0 pannier tanks for the Western Region.

The last steam locomotives to be built were a conventional 0-6-0T in 1958 and a six-coupled fireless locomotive in 1959. The Forth Street works were closed in 1960 and the Darlington Works, continuing with diesel and electric locomotives, became the English Electric Company Darlington Works in 1962.

== Redevelopment ==
The office block and one workshop of Stephenson's Forth Street Works in South Street, Newcastle upon Tyne, were restored by The Robert Stephenson Trust. The Trust lost its lease to these buildings in February 2009, following purchase of the whole Robert Stephenson and Hawthorn Leslie locomotive works sites for redevelopment as the "Stephenson Quarter". The restored block and several other buildings are protected by United Kingdom listed building status, but future public access is uncertain.

Commencing in 2013, the site started to be redeveloped. The landlord fronting this operation was initially Silverlink Developers, later Clouston Group. As part of their commitment to the area's heritage, they hosted a once monthly opening of the South Street buildings housing a music, food and drink festival branded as the Boiler Shop Steamer. Councillor Nick Forbes, leader of Newcastle City Council, visited the development on 8 April 2014 to give the city's seal of approval to the project. In 2017 the former boiler shop and 20 South Street opened as a music and entertainment venue, the Boiler Shop.

== See also ==
- List of rolling stock manufacturers

== Map locations ==
- 54.54315°N 1.53641°W, Robert Stephenson locomotive works, Darlington
- 54.96715°N 1.615241°W, Robert Stephenson & Co., South Street, Forth Bank, Newcastle works
