= Beattie well tanks =

British 19th-century steam locomotives

The Beattie well tanks were a series of 111 steam locomotives of seven different designs produced for the London and South Western Railway (LSWR) between 1852 and 1875. All carried the water supply in well tanks, set low down between the frames. All had six wheels; the first three designs were of the 2-2-2WT wheel arrangement, the last four being 2-4-0WT. Most were designed by Joseph Hamilton Beattie, the LSWR Mechanical Engineer, but the last few locomotives built to the seventh design incorporated modifications made by his son and successor, William George Beattie. Most were intended for the LSWR's suburban services, but were later used elsewhere on the LSWR system before withdrawal. Apart from three locomotives which lasted until 1962, withdrawal occurred between 1871 and 1899.

== Background ==
The LSWR developed an extensive network of suburban lines in south-west London between the 1840s and the 1880s. Initially, these services were operated using tender locomotives, mainly 2-2-2s, designed by John Viret Gooch, the LSWR Locomotive Superintendent.

In 1850, the LSWR decided that the London suburban passenger services should be operated using small tank locomotives. To determine the most suitable type, Gooch's successor Joseph Hamilton Beattie, the LSWR Mechanical Engineer, prepared a series of designs for six-wheeled well tank locomotives, each of which incorporated one or more differences from the previous class. A small quantity of each was produced: between 1852 and 1859, 26 were built, to six different designs, followed by a seventh design built in much larger numbers.

== 2-2-2 well tanks ==
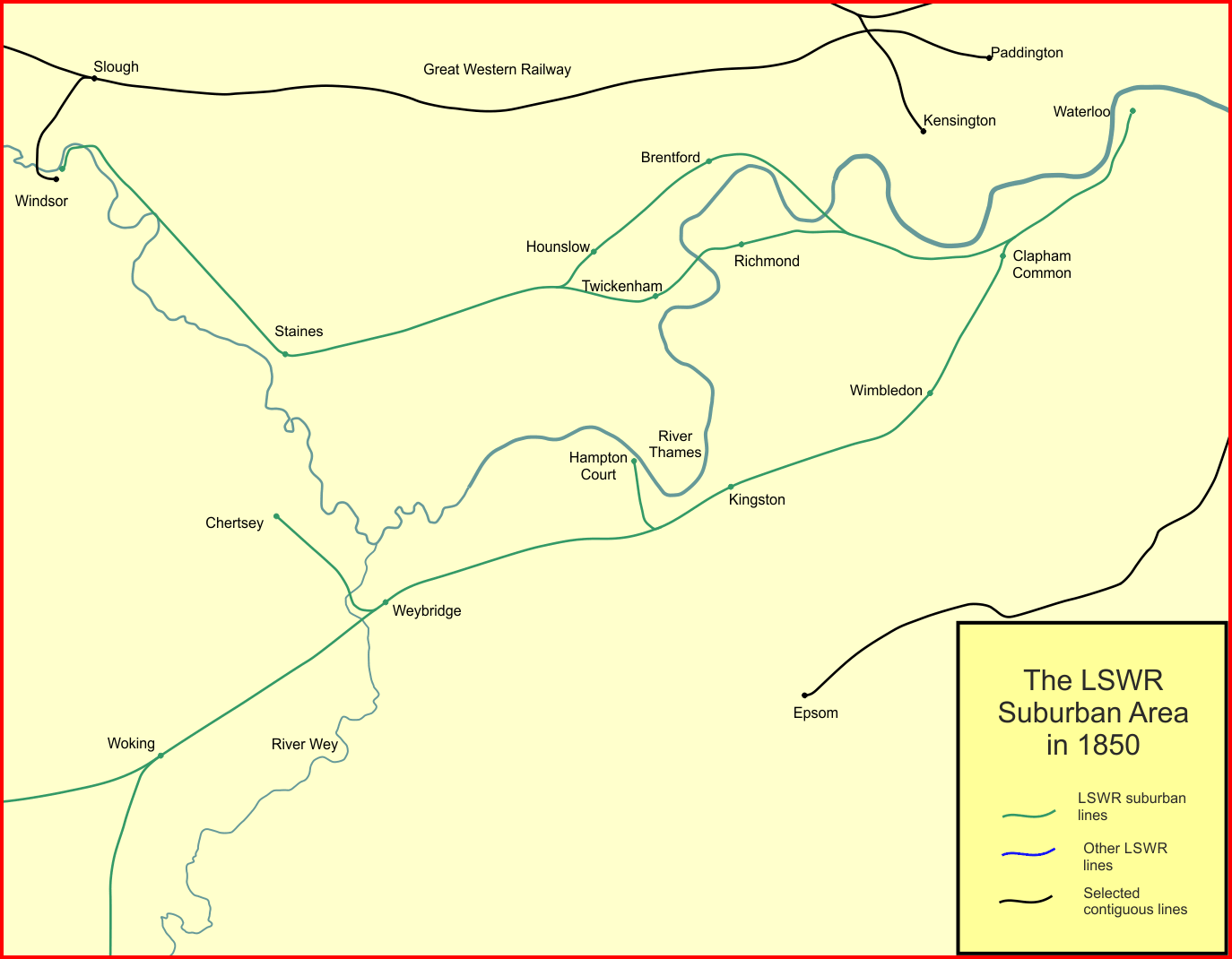
The LSWR suburban system as at December 1850

=== Tartar class ===
Six locomotives (nos. 2, 12, 13, 17, 18, 33) built by Sharp Brothers (works numbers 689–694) and delivered in May–July 1852. These were of the 2-2-2WT wheel arrangement, having a wheelbase of 14 ft 9 in (4.50 m), driving wheels of 6 ft 0 1/2 in (1.842 m) diameter, leading and trailing wheels of 3 ft 8 in (1.12 m) diameter, and cylinders measuring 14 1/4 in × 20 in (360 mm × 510 mm) mounted outside the frames. The valves were above the cylinders, and the valve gear was inside the frames, driving the valves via rocking shafts. The main frames were positioned inside the wheels, but an additional set of outside frames supported the trailing axle, and the leading axle also had outside bearings attached to springs below the slide bars. The boiler had a grate area of 9.2 sq ft (0.85 m^{2}), a heating surface totalling 781 sq ft (72.6 m^{2}) and worked at a pressure of 120 lbf/in^{2} (830 kPa). The well tanks held 478 imp gal (2,170 L) of water, and the bunker held 10 long cwt (510 kg) of coke. The weight was 26.4 long tons (26.8 t) in working order.

When new, they were used on the London suburban services, but by mid-1860 had moved west – three were used in the Exeter area, two on the Seaton branch line, and one on the Chard branch line. Later on, some were used on the Lymington branch line, but by the end of 1867 all were on the Exmouth branch. No. 18 was withdrawn in 1871, and the others followed at intervals unlil the last one, no. 17, was withdrawn in 1874.

=== Sussex class ===
Eight locomotives (nos. 1, 4, 6, 14, 15, 19, 20, 36) built by the LSWR at Nine Elms in May–December 1852. No works numbers were allotted, since not all of the parts were new: a few items were recovered from old locomotives. Although assembly took place at Nine Elms, most of the new components were bought from Beyer, Peacock & Co. They differed from the Tartar class in several ways, primarily in using smaller 5 ft 6 in (1.68 m) diameter driving wheels, and lacking the outside frames at the rear – although the rear axle still had outside bearings. Other differences included the grate area of 8.9 sq ft (0.83 m^{2}), heating surface totalling 750 sq ft (70 m^{2}), water capacity 550 imp gal (2,500 L) and the weight was 27.1 long tons (27.5 t) in working order. There were variations within the class: the leading and trailing wheels were 3 ft 6 in (1.07 m) for five locomotives, but nos. 1, 14 and 15 were 3 ft 0 in (0.91 m); the cylinder bore of the first five was 14 in (360 mm), that of the last three was 14 1/2 in (370 mm).

As with the Tartar class, they were originally used in the London area, but later moved elsewhere – three were operating in the Southampton area by 1864, and others were used in the Exmouth, Poole and Yeovil areas. Between 1870 and 1872 they were transferred to the duplicate list, the numbers being prefixed with a zero in the records – for example, no. 1 became no. 01 in July 1870. This was done in order to release their old numbers for new locomotives, including no. 36 of the 298 class. Withdrawal occurred between 1871 and 1877.

=== Chaplin class ===
Three locomotives (nos. 9, 10, 34) built at Nine Elms in July–August 1856. No. 34 Osprey incorporated second-hand material, and was considered to be a rebuild of no. 34 Crescent (originally a 2-2-2 built by Fenton, Murray and Jackson in 1840, which had been rebuilt as a 2-2-2WT at Nine Elms in 1851); but nos. 9 Chaplin and 10 Aurora were new, and given works numbers 61 and 62. They differed from the Sussex class in having 3 ft 1 in (0.94 m) trailing wheels, water capacity 485 imp gal (2,200 L) and coke capacity 15 long cwt (760 kg).

After use in the London area, they moved to Bishopstoke or Salisbury, and were later used at Stokes Bay, Dorchester and Bournemouth. They were transferred to the duplicate list in 1870–74 (no. 9 becoming no. 09, etc.) and were withdrawn in 1876–77.

== Earlier 2-4-0 well tanks ==
=== Minerva class ===
Three locomotives (nos. 11, 16, 39) built at Nine Elms (works numbers 58–60) in May–July 1856. Generally larger than the preceding designs, they were of the 2-4-0WT wheel arrangement, having coupled wheels of 5 ft 6 in (1.68 m) diameter, leading wheels of 3 ft 6 in (1.07 m) diameter, and cylinders measuring 14 in × 21 in (360 mm × 530 mm) mounted outside the frames. The boiler had a grate area of 9 sq ft (0.84 m^{2}), a heating surface totalling 764 sq ft (71.0 m^{2}) and worked at a pressure of 120 lbf/in^{2} (830 kPa). The well tanks held 435 imp gal (1,980 L) of water, and the bunker held 15 long cwt (760 kg) of coke. The weight was 28.35 long tons (28.80 t) in working order.

Originally used around London, two moved to Woking by 1866 and the other one to Guildford. Later they were used at Salisbury, and one was eventually at Bournemouth. They were transferred to the duplicate list in 1872–74 (no. 11 becoming no. 011, etc.), and were withdrawn in 1874–83.

=== Nelson class ===
Three locomotives (nos. 143–145) built at Nine Elms (works numbers 85–87) in July–August 1858. Differences from the Minerva class were in the coupled wheels, which were 5 ft 0 in (1.52 m) diameter, the cylinders, which measured 15 1/2 in × 20 in (390 mm × 510 mm), and the water capacity which was increased to 550 imp gal (2,500 L). The leading axle had no outside bearings.

The names were all of former admirals in the Royal Navy: 143 Nelson, 144 Howe and 145 Hood. These were intended for the Lymington branch, but only one was sent there initially – the other two went to London. All three had moved to Exeter by 1867, later on, they were used in other areas such as Ash, Weymouth and Yeovil. Transfer to the duplicate list occurred in 1880–81 (the three becoming nos. 0143–0145), followed by withdrawal in 1882–85.

=== Nile class ===
Three locomotives (nos. 154–156) built at Nine Elms (works numbers 88–90) in April–May 1859. Based on the Minerva class, several changes were made to the dimensions. The wheelbase was 12 ft 3 in (3.73 m), the coupled wheels 5 ft 9 in (1.75 m) diameter, and the cylinders had a bore of 14 1/2 in (370 mm). The boiler had a grate area of 14 sq ft (1.3 m^{2}), a heating surface totalling 779.5 sq ft (72.42 m^{2}) and worked at a pressure of 130 lbf/in^{2} (900 kPa). The well tanks held 485 imp gal (2,200 L) of water. The weight was 29.15 long tons (29.62 t) in working order.

The names were all of historic battles: 154 Nile, 155 Cressy and 156 Hogue. After use in London, they moved to other places like Dorchester, Exeter, Gosport, Guildford or Weymouth. They were withdrawn in 1882.

== Standard 2-4-0 well tanks: 298 class ==
Having chosen the most suitable characteristics, Beattie prepared a standard design of 2-4-0WT with 5-foot-6-inch (1.676 m) driving wheels and cylinders 15 by 20 in (381 by 508 mm), bore by stroke; and the LSWR began to take delivery of these in 1863. The new design eventually totalled 85 locomotives; most came from the Manchester firm of Beyer, Peacock and Company between 1863 and 1875, but three were built in the LSWR workshops at Nine Elms (works numbers 94–96) during 1872. Their numbers were 33, 34, 36, 44, 76, 177–220, 243–270, 298, 299, 314 and 325–329.

== Locomotive names ==
All of the earlier locomotives were named, together with five of the 298 class. The names were as follows:

List of names
Number	Name	Class	Built
1	Sussex	Sussex	September 1852
2	Tartar	Tartar	May 1852
4	Locke	Sussex	August 1852
6	Cossack	Sussex	September 1852
9	Chaplin	Chaplin	July 1856
10	Aurora	Chaplin	July 1856
11	Minerva	Minerva	May 1856
12	Jupiter	Tartar	June 1852
13	Orion	Tartar	June 1852
14	Mercury	Sussex	May 1852
15	Mars	Sussex	May 1852
16	Salisbury	Minerva	June 1856
17	Queen	Tartar	July 1852
18	Albert	Tartar	July 1852
19	Briton	Sussex	December 1852
20	Princess	Sussex	December 1852
33	Phoenix	Tartar	July 1852
33	Phoenix	298	February 1872
34	Osprey	Chaplin	August 1856
34	Osprey	298	May 1874
36	Comet	Sussex	June 1852
36	Comet	298	February 1872
39	Wizard	Minerva	July 1856
44	Pluto	298	October 1875
76	Firefly	298	February 1872
143	Nelson	Nelson	July 1858
144	Howe	Nelson	August 1858
145	Hood	Nelson	August 1858
154	Nile	Nile	April 1859
155	Cressy	Nile	May 1859
156	Hogue	Nile	May 1859

Locomotives numbered between 1 and 76 were built as replacements for older locomotives, which reused both the number and, in most cases, the name of the locomotive being replaced.
