= Joseph Hamilton Beattie =

- Born: 12 May 1808
- Died: 18 October 1871 (aged 63)
- Children: William George Beattie
- Engineering career
- Discipline: Locomotive engineer
- Employer: London and South Western Railway

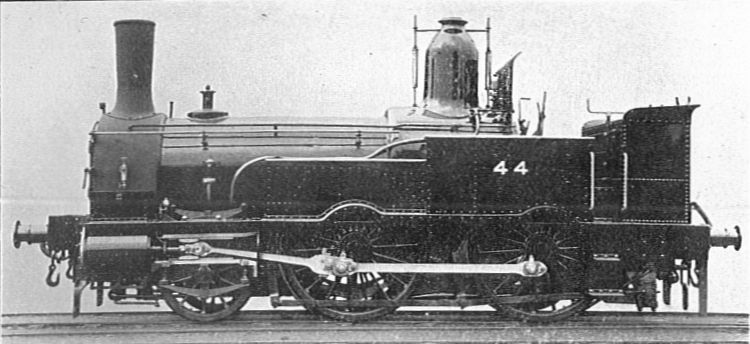
Beattie 2-4-0 well tank

Joseph Hamilton Beattie (1808-1871) was a locomotive engineer with the London and South Western Railway. Joseph Beattie was born in Ireland on 12 May 1808. He was educated in Belfast and initially apprenticed to his father, a Derry architect. He moved to England in 1835 to serve as an assistant to Joseph Locke on the Grand Junction Railway and from 1837 on the London and Southampton Railway. After the line opened he became the carriage and wagon superintendent at Nine Elms and succeeded John Viret Gooch as locomotive engineer on 1 July 1850.

== Locomotives ==
Initially he designed a series of singles, but the weight of the Southampton and Salisbury expresses led to the development of 2-4-0s. He continued to develop the design over the next 20 years. In addition he developed a series of 2-2-2 and 2-4-0 well tanks and three classes of 0-6-0s. His locomotives were amongst the most efficient of the time. Three of his most famous locomotive design, the 0298 Class 2-4-0 well tanks, were in service for 88 years, until 1962. 2 have been preserved - see the Swanage Railway, Bodmin & Wenford Railway and the National Railway Museum, York.

=== Locomotive classes ===
Locomotive classes designed by J.H. Beattie
Class	Wheel arrangement	Driving wheels	Years built	Builders	Quantity	Purpose	Notes
Hercules	2-4-0	5 ft 6 in (1.7 m)	1851–55	Nine Elms	15	Goods	
Tartar	2-2-2WT	6 ft 0 1/2 in (1.8 m)	1852	Sharp Brothers	6	Suburban passenger	
Sussex	2-2-2WT	5 ft 6 in (1.7 m)	1852	Nine Elms	8	Suburban passenger	
Saxon	2-4-0	5 ft 0 in (1.5 m)	1855–57	Nine Elms	12	Goods	
Canute	2-2-2	6 ft 6 in (2.0 m)	1855–59	Nine Elms	12	Passenger	
Chaplin	2-2-2WT	5 ft 6 in (1.7 m)	1856	Nine Elms	3	Suburban passenger	
Minerva	2-4-0WT	5 ft 6 in (1.7 m)	1856	Nine Elms	3	Suburban passenger	
Nelson	2-4-0WT	5 ft 0 in (1.5 m)	1858	Nine Elms	3	Suburban passenger	
Tweed	2-4-0	6 ft 0 in (1.8 m)	1858–59	Nine Elms	6	Passenger	
Clyde	2-4-0	7 ft 0 in (2.1 m)	1859–68	Nine Elms	13	Express passenger	
Nile	2-4-0WT	5 ft 9 in (1.8 m)	1859	Nine Elms	3	Suburban passenger	
Undine	2-4-0	6 ft 6 in (2.0 m)	1859–60	Nine Elms	12	Passenger	
Eagle	2-4-0	6 ft 0 in (1.8 m)	1862	Nine Elms	3	Passenger	
Gem	2-4-0	5 ft 0 in (1.5 m)	1862–63	Nine Elms	6	Goods	
298	2-4-0WT	5 ft 6 in (1.7 m)	1863–71	Beyer, Peacock	70	Suburban passenger	15 more ordered by W.G. Beattie
Falcon	2-4-0	6 ft 6 in (2.0 m)	1863–67	Nine Elms	17	Passenger	
Lion	0-6-0	5 ft 0 in (1.5 m)	1863–71	Nine Elms	32	Goods	Six more ordered by W.G. Beattie
221	0-6-0	5 ft 1 in (1.5 m)	1866–72	Beyer, Peacock	18	Goods	Six more ordered by W.G. Beattie
231	2-4-0	6 ft 0 in (1.8 m)	1866	Beyer, Peacock	6	Passenger	
Volcano	2-4-0	6 ft 0 in (1.8 m)	1866–69	Nine Elms	12	Passenger	Six more ordered by W.G. Beattie
Vesuvius	2-4-0	6 ft 6 in (2.0 m)	1869–71	Nine Elms	14	Passenger	18 more ordered by W.G. Beattie

== Innovations ==
Beattie was a highly innovative engineer, introducing the country's first successful 2-4-0 locomotive, pioneering feedwater heating, balanced slide valves and coal-burning fireboxes. Since the Rainhill Trials in 1829, it had been accepted that the smoke emitted by burning coal was a nuisance. Railway companies accepted the need to burn coke (a smokeless fuel) in their locomotives, but this was much more expensive than coal, and several locomotive engineers sought a method by which coal could be burned smokelessly. One such engineer was Beattie, who designed a boiler suitable for coal in 1853. However, James Livesey (1831-1925), while demonstrating in Antwerp Beattie's smoke-consuming locomotives for the Belgian Government Railway, finds that this engine does not let enough air in and does not consume as much smoke as it could.

== Death ==
On 18 October 1871, Beattie died of diphtheria and was succeeded as locomotive engineer by his son William George Beattie.

Business positions
Preceded by John Viret Gooch	Locomotive Superintendent of the London and South Western Railway; 1850–1871	Succeeded by William George Beattie
