= LSWR 0298 Class =

Class of British steam locomotive

LSWR 0298 class
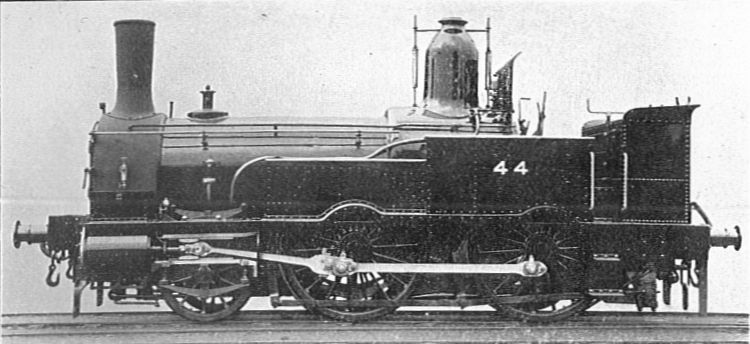
- No. 44 of the final (1875) batch as constructed, showing rectangular splashers characteristic of that batch.
Type and origin
- Power type: Steam
- Designer: Joseph Beattie
- Builder: Beyer, Peacock & Co. (82); Nine Elms Works (3)
- Build date: 1863–1875
- Total produced: 85
Specifications
- Configuration
  - Whyte: 2-4-0WT
  - UIC: 1B n2t
- Gauge: 4 ft 8 1/2 in (1,435 mm) standard gauge
- Leading dia.: 3 ft 7 3/4 in (1.111 m)
- Driver dia.: 5 ft 7 in (1.702 m)
- Length: 26 ft 2 in (7.98 m)
- Height: 11 ft 11 5/8 in (3.65 m)
- Loco weight: 37.8 long tons (38.4 t; 42.3 short tons)
- Fuel type: Coal
- Fuel capacity: 1 long ton (1.02 t; 1.12 short tons)
- Water cap.: 550 imp gal (2,500 L; 660 US gal)
- Boiler pressure: 160 psi (1.10 MPa)
- Cylinders: Two, outside
- Cylinder size: 16.5 in × 20 in (419 mm × 508 mm)
Performance figures
- Tractive effort: 11,050 lbf (49.2 kN)
Career
- Operators: LSWR · SR · BR
- Class: 329, later 0298
- Power class: SR: not classified BR: 0P
- Withdrawn: 1886–1899 (82); 1962 (3)
- Disposition: Two preserved, remainder scrapped

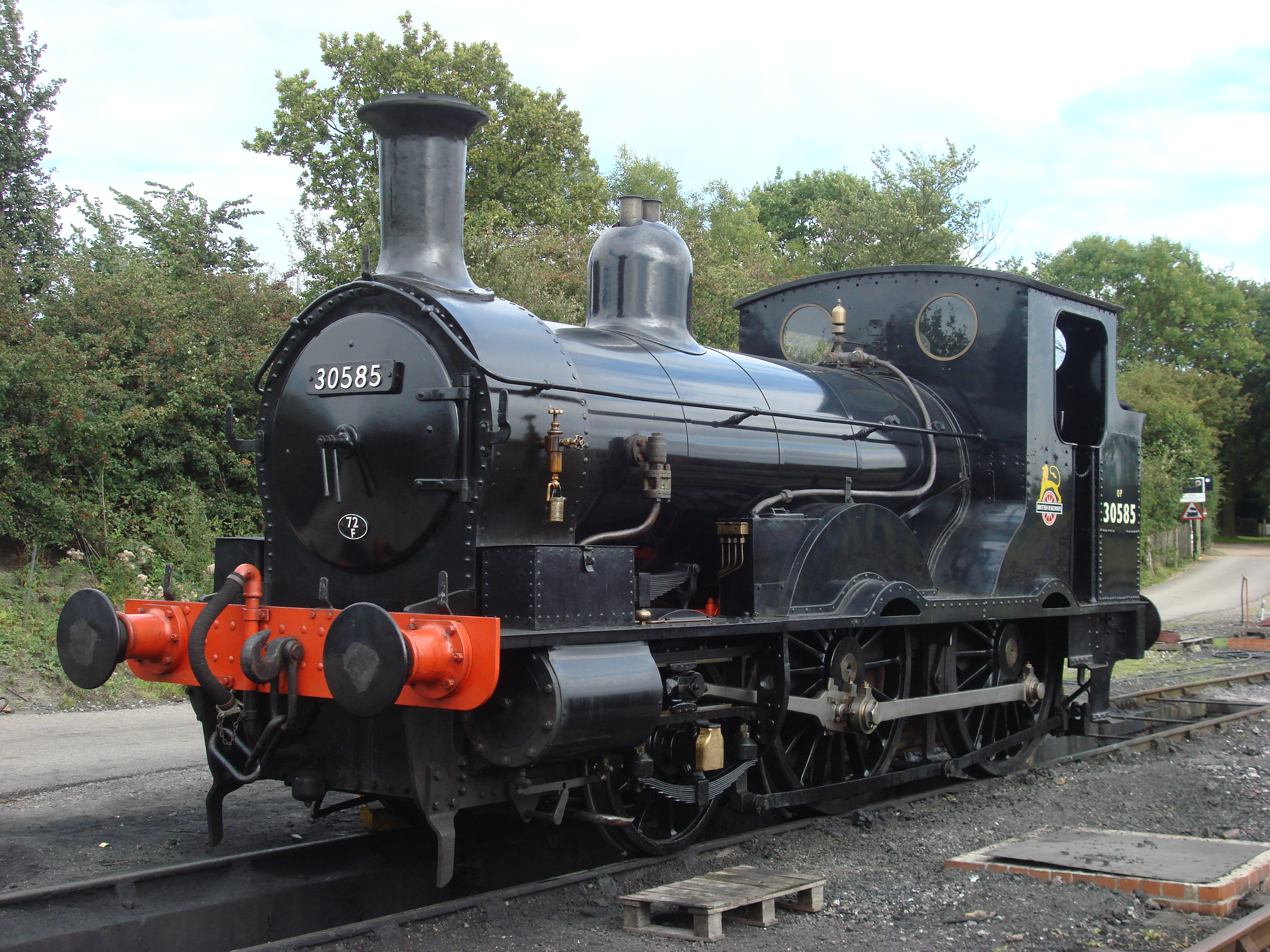
Beattie Well Tank No. 0314 (30585) as modernised between 1889 and 1894. Photographed at the Buckinghamshire Railway Centre, where it is preserved.

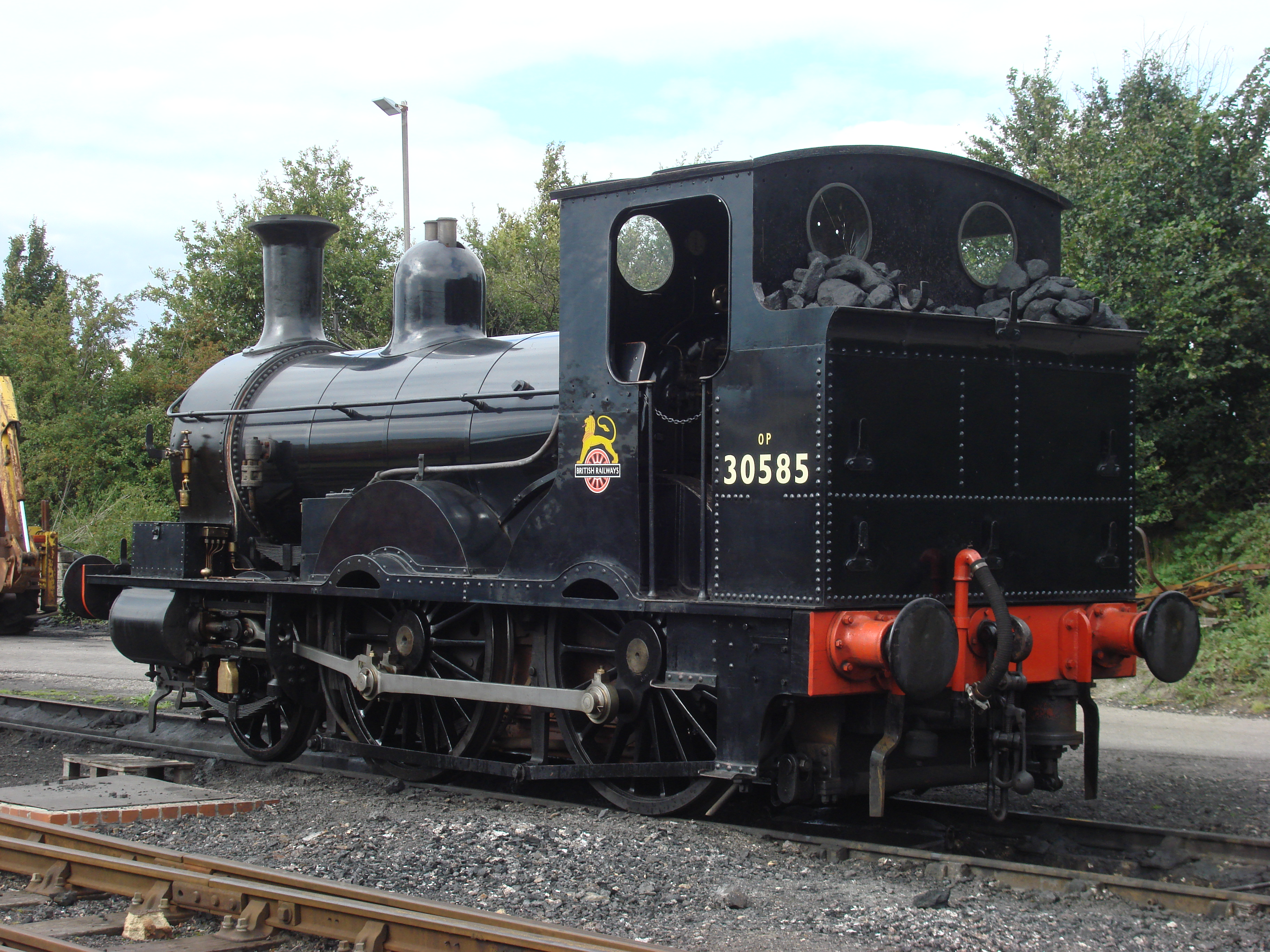
A rear view of the same locomotive.

The London and South Western Railway (LSWR) 0298 Class or Beattie Well Tank is a class of British steam locomotive. They are 2-4-0WTs, originally built between 1863 and 1875 for use on passenger services in the suburbs of London, but later used on rural services in South West England. Out of a total production of 85, two locomotives have been preserved, both in operational condition.

== History ==
In 1850, the LSWR decided that the London suburban passenger services should be operated using small tank locomotives. To determine the most suitable type, Joseph Hamilton Beattie, the LSWR Mechanical Engineer, prepared a series of designs for six-wheeled well tank locomotives, each of which incorporated one or more differences from the previous class. A small quantity of each was produced: between 1852 and 1859, 26 were built, to six different designs. These were the Tartar and Sussex classes of 1852, the Chaplin and Minerva classes of 1856, the Nelson class of 1858 and the Nile class of 1859. The wheel arrangement was either 2-2-2WT or 2-4-0WT; the driving wheels varied between 5 feet (1.524 m) and 6 feet (1.829 m) in diameter; the cylinder bore varied between 14 and 15 1/2 in (356 and 394 mm); the stroke was either 20 or 21 in (508 or 533 mm); and there were other changes.

Having chosen the most suitable characteristics, Beattie prepared a standard design of 2-4-0WT with 5-foot-6-inch (1.676 m) driving wheels and cylinders 15 by 20 in (381 by 508 mm), bore by stroke; and the LSWR began to take delivery of these in 1863. The new design eventually totalled 85 locomotives; most came from the Manchester firm of Beyer, Peacock and Company between 1863 and 1875, but three were built in the LSWR workshops at Nine Elms during 1872. Their numbers were 33, 34, 36, 44, 76, 177–220, 243–270, 298, 299, 314 and 325–329.

The locomotives were built as follows:

Dates built	Builder	Works nos.	Quantity	LSWR numbers
February–March 1863	Beyer, Peacock	331–336	6	177–182
October–December 1863	Beyer, Peacock	379–384	6	183–188
December 1863	Beyer, Peacock	390–395	6	189–194
June 1864	Beyer, Peacock	493–498	6	195–200
June 1865	Beyer, Peacock	544–549	6	203–208
April–June 1866	Beyer, Peacock	638–643	6	209–214
June 1866	Beyer, Peacock	694–699	6	215–220
July–December 1867	Beyer, Peacock	758–769	12	243–254
July 1868	Beyer, Peacock	838–845	8	255–262
September–November 1871	Beyer, Peacock	1089–1096	8	263–270
February 1872	Nine Elms	94–96 (2nd series)	3	33, 36, 76
May–June 1874	Beyer, Peacock	1409–1414	6	201–202, 34, 298–299, 314
October–November 1875	Beyer, Peacock	1533–1538	6	44, 325–329

The locomotives delivered in February 1863 were the first locomotives on the LSWR not to be given names. Five of the later locomotives were named: 33 Phœnix; 34 Osprey; 36 Comet; 44 Pluto; 76 Firefly; these names were generally taken from older locomotives which had carried the same numbers.

In a well tank locomotive, the water tanks are not mounted above the footplate, but are set low down. On these locomotives, there were two tanks, both between the frames: one was above the leading axle, the other beneath the cab footplate. Although a standard design, there were periodic changes - the cylinder bore was enlarged to 15 1/2 in (390 mm) from no. 189 and again to 16 1/2 in (420 mm) for the three Nine Elms engines; and the last twelve, of 1874–75, had cylinders 15 1/2 in × 22 in (390 mm × 560 mm). The three Nine Elms locomotives, and the last six of 1875, exhibited more obvious detail differences compared to the other 76: the leading wheels were 3 ft 7 3/4 in (1.111 m) diameter instead of 3 ft 6 in (1.07 m); two of the four safety valves were larger; but the most noticeable difference was that the splashers were rectangular instead of round. These resembled side tanks, but carried no water—this feature was introduced by J.H. Beattie's son and successor, William George Beattie, who had taken office on 23 November 1871 after his father's death on 18 October.

They handled heavy loads with ease, and were fast runners. From 1890, when newer locomotives became available for the London suburban services, the Beattie 2-4-0WT were sent to depots outside the London area. Some of their new duties required a greater water capacity than the tanks could contain, and so 31 were converted to tender engines between 1883 and 1887; these were withdrawn between 1888 and 1898. Of the remainder, most were withdrawn between 1888 and 1899, but six (nos. 44, 257, 266, 298, 314, 329) were modernised between 1889 and 1894 for use on branch lines such as those to Exmouth and Sidmouth. Three of these, nos. 44, 257 and 266 (the latter two having by then been renumbered 0257 and 0266), were also withdrawn between 1896 and 1898.

The other three locomotives (298, 314 and 329) were transferred to the Bodmin and Wadebridge Railway in 1895, which was one of the earliest railways in Cornwall and isolated from the main LSWR network until that year. These three remained in service because of the sharp curves of that railway's freight branch to Wenford Bridge, which carried China clay traffic to the main line. They were finally withdrawn in 1962 and replaced by GWR 1366 Class 0-6-0PT dock tanks. In 1958, they were noted as "the oldest design still in use on British Railways (although not quite the oldest engines ...)", the latter distinction being given to Nos. 32636 and 32670 of the former LB&SCR A1X class, which had been built in 1872.

== Renumbering ==
When the locomotives became old, their numbers were altered in order to release numbers for newer locomotives being built as replacements. The process was known as a transfer to the "duplicate list", and the existing number could be altered in any of four ways: addition of zero prefix; being crossed out; being underlined; being given a 5-inch (13 cm) line or dot beneath the number. These methods were equivalent, and some locos had the numbers altered in one way on the cab side, and in a different way in the record books. Thus, no. 298 became no. 0298.

Duplication and withdrawal
Year	Transferred to duplicate list	Withdrawn	Remaining at end of year: capital/duplicate
1885			85/–
1886		258	84/–
1887		216	83/–
1888	76, 177	195/7, 201/3/5, 325	75/2
1889	178, 194	199, 211, 243, 251, 269, 299	67/4
1890	179–193	33, 207, 249, 252/9, 267/8	45/19
1891	196/8, 200/2/4/6/8–10	218, 245, 250, 260	32/28
1892	213–5/7/9, 220	0180, 0190, 0206, 212, 0219, 327	24/30
1893		0177, 0181/3, 0200/9, 0220, 253, 270	22/24
1894	257, 261–6	36, 0187, 0192, 0264	14/28
1895		34, 0179, 0182/4/6/8, 0193/8, 0208, 255	12/20
1896		0191/4/6, 0210, 0213/4/7, 247, 0257	11/12
1897	244/6/8, 254/6	0178, 0185/9, 0215, 0244, 0265, 326	5/11
1898	298	44, 0202/4, 0246/8, 0254/6, 0261–3/6, 328	2/2
1899		076	2/1
1901	314, 329		–/3
1962		30585–7	0

Not every loco was transferred to the duplicate list - several were withdrawn whilst carrying their original numbers. Most were transferred between 1888 and 1894, but the three retained for the Bodmin and Wadebridge Railway were not given duplicate numbers until later on. The renumberings of these final three were as follows:

Original number (date built)	Duplicate list	Southern Railway 2nd no.	British Railways
298 (June 1874)	0298 (June 1898)	3298 (May 1933)	30587 (July 1948)
314 (June 1874)	0314 (May 1901)	3314 (November 1936)	30585 (December 1948)
329 (November 1875)	0329 (October 1901)	3329 (September 1935)	30586 (April 1948)

The first SR number was simply the final LSWR number prefixed with "E", to denote Eastleigh Works.

== Preservation ==
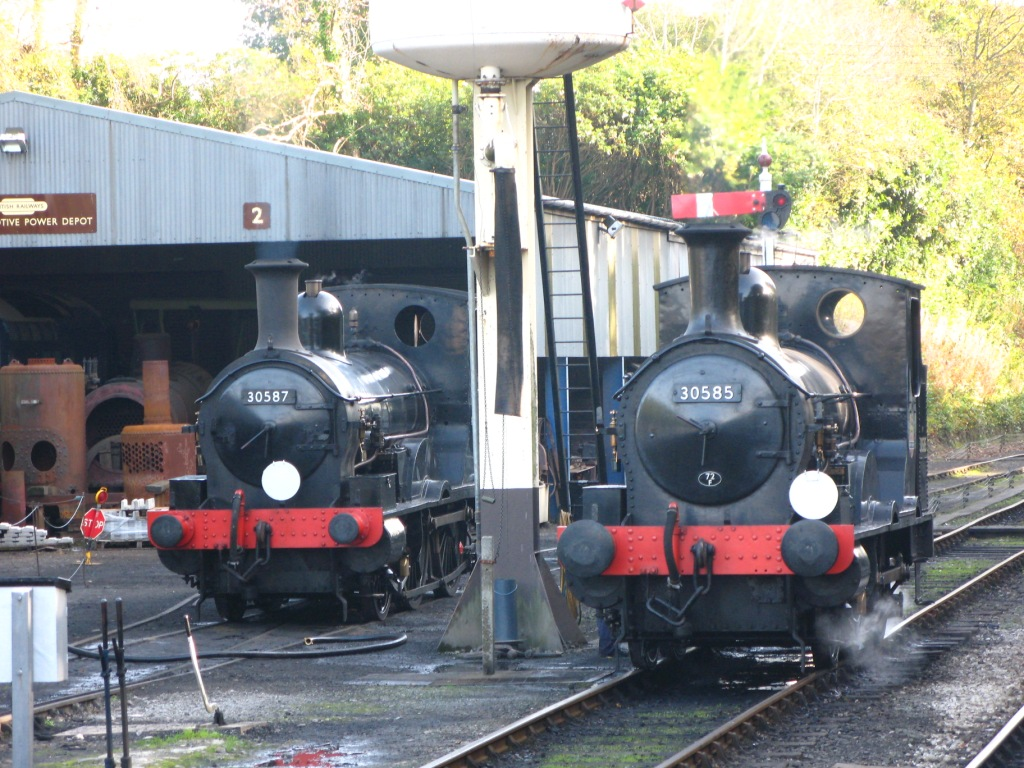
Both preserved members of the LSWR 0298 class working at Bodmin General on the Bodmin and Wenford Railway in October 2010.

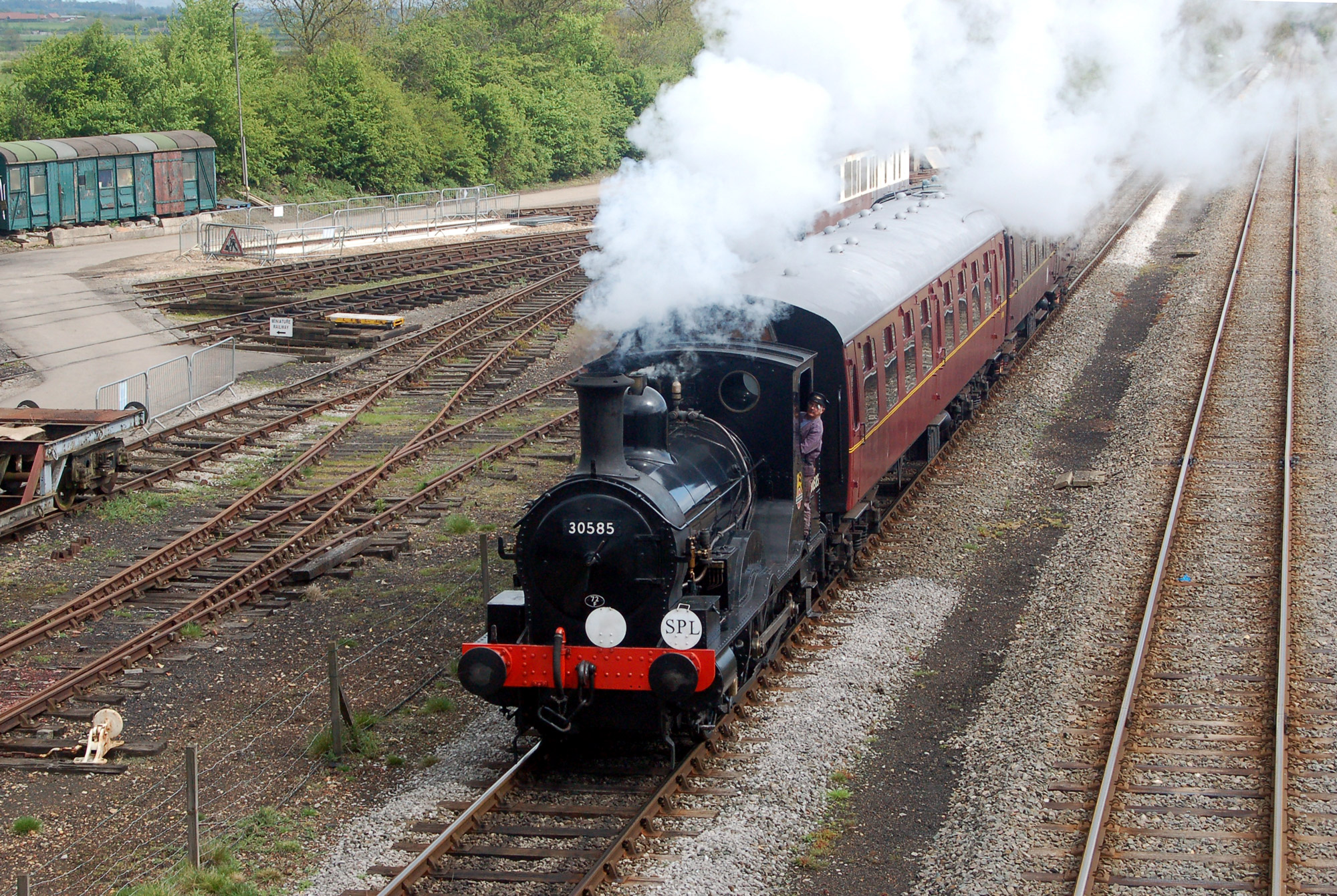
Locomotive 30585 in action at Buckinghamshire Railway Centre in May 2010.

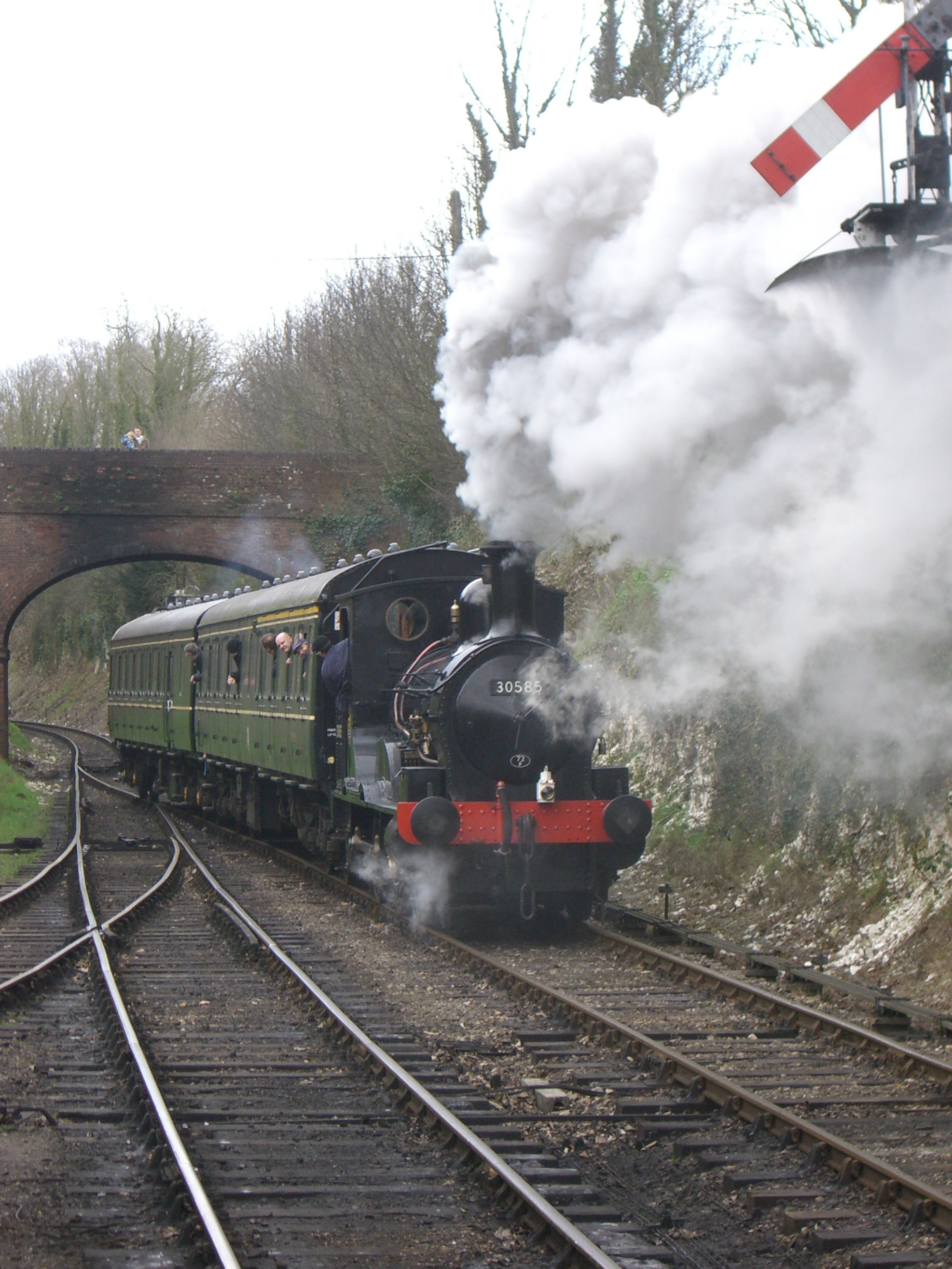
Locomotive 30585 in action on the Mid-Hants Railway in March 2009.

Two of the locomotives have survived and are preserved. Number 298 (later renumbered 30587) is owned by the National Railway Museum (NRM) and is loaned to, and normally based at, the Bodmin and Wenford Railway, however it was at the NRM for six months (from July 2018 until January 2019) hauling brake-van rides in the South Yard. Number 314 (30585) is owned by the Quainton Railway Society and normally based at their Buckinghamshire Railway Centre.

In October 2010, 30585 was on short-term loan to the Bodmin and Wenford Railway. Both preserved engines were in steam and operating trains together on parts of the routes they would have served between 1895 and 1962.

== Models ==
Dapol originally manufactured a model of the 0298 in OO gauge for sale exclusively by Kernow Model Rail Centre. It is now marketed by many other retailers by Bachmann under the EFE brand. The new models under the brand were confirmed in November 2020.

== Bibliography ==
- Ahrons, E.L. (1987) [1927]. The British Steam Railway Locomotive 1825-1925. London: Bracken Books. ISBN 1-85170-103-6.
- Bradley, D.L. (1965). Locomotives of the L.S.W.R.: Part 1. Kenilworth: RCTS.
- Bradley, D.L. (June 1969). Locomotives of the L.B.&S.C.R.: Part 1. London: RCTS.
- Bradley, D.L. (1989). L&SWR Locomotives, The Early Engines 1838–53 and the Beattie Classes. Didcot: Wild Swan Publications. ISBN 0-906867-81-9.
- Casserley, H.C., ed. (1958) [1955]. Railway Locomotives of Britain. The Observer's Book of (new ed.). London: Frederick Warne & Co. 23.
- Ellis, C. Hamilton (1956). South Western Railway.
- Russell, J. H. (1991). A Pictorial Record of Southern Locomotives. OPC-Haynes. pp. 137–138.
