= John Viret Gooch =

British locomotive engineer

- Born: 29 June 1812; Bedlington, Northumberland, England
- Died: 8 June 1900 (aged 87)
- Known for: locomotive superintendent of LSWR

John Viret Gooch FRSA (29 June 1812 – 8 June 1900) was the locomotive superintendent of the London and South Western Railway from 1841 to 1850. Born at Bedlington, Northumberland, John Viret Gooch (elder brother of Daniel Gooch) was the second son of John and Anna (born Longridge).

== Career ==
=== Grand Junction Railway ===
He became the pupil of Joseph Locke during the construction of the Grand Junction Railway and he became the resident engineer after that line opened.

=== Manchester and Leeds Railway ===
In 1840 he joined his older brother Thomas Longridge Gooch on the Manchester and Leeds Railway.

=== London and South Western Railway ===
The LSWR's first locomotive engineer was Joseph Woods, who was subordinate to Locke, the LSWR's chief engineer. Following two unfavourable reports by Locke in September and November 1840 regarding the state of the LSWR's locomotive department, Woods resigned on 23 December 1840. To replace him, Gooch was recommended to the LSWR by Locke, and appointed locomotive superintendent on 1 January 1841. Officially Locke remained in charge of the department.

LSWR locomotives

Initially locomotives were purchased from a wide range of private manufacturers such as Edward Bury and Company and Nasmyth, Gaskell and Company. From Jan 1843 the LSWR's own Nine Elms Locomotive Works started production with the 'Eagle' class singles. Gooch's designs included a number of singles and the 'Bison' class 0-6-0 goods.

The first LSWR locomotives had names, but not numbers, and this practice was continued after Gooch's appointment. On 9 December 1845, Gooch was instructed to number the locomotive fleet; a numbering scheme was prepared by 16 December, and all locomotives were numbered by 30 June 1846; the existing names were retained, new locomotives receiving both names and numbers.

Locomotive classes introduced by J.V. Gooch
Class	Wheel arrangement	Years built	Builders	Quantity	Numbers	Notes
Southampton	2-2-2	1841–42	William Fairbairn & Sons	11	16–26 (Note: Numbers applied 1846)	Renewals of locomotives built 1838–39
Eagle	2-2-2	1843–44	Nine Elms	4	27–30	Rebuilds of locomotives built 1838–39
Bison	0-6-0	1845–48	Nine Elms	10	49–52, 101–6	
Alecto	2-2-2	1846–47	William Fairbairn & Sons	10	63–72	
Fireball	2-2-2	1846–48	Rothwell and Company	28	73–100	
Mazeppa	2-2-2	1847	Nine Elms	10	53–62	
Gem	2-2-2	1847	Stothert, Slaughter & Co	2	107–8	
Rocklia	2-2-2	1848–49	Christie, Adams & Hill	6	109–114	
Vesuvius	2-2-2	1849–53	Nine Elms	9	115–123	

The numbers 1–15 and 31–48 were given to locomotives of the Woods period that were still in service in December 1845.

=== Eastern Counties Railway ===
After leaving the LSWR in 1850, Gooch was appointed to the post of Locomotive Superintendent to the Eastern Counties Railway. On appointment he was given a free hand by chairman Edward Ladd Betts to reduce working costs of which he would receive 2.5% of any savings made. Unfortunately there were no checks and balances in place (and nor was the move minuted), so Viret would tell the accountant what he had saved and receive his payment. The main target of his costs were the engine drivers where he would sack men and then offer them their own jobs back at a lower rate, and deduct money from their wages for late running or mechanical failure.

Betts was succeeded as chairman by David Waddington in 1851, who made himself responsible for the ECR stores committee. Gooch made an agreement with the Norfolk and Eastern Counties Coal Company which was partnership of coal merchant E and A Prior David Waddington, Samuel Morton Peto and Gooch, where they would pay him 3d (3 old UK pennies) per ton purchased. Viret would then sell some of the ECR coal on for further personal gain.

On 12 August 178 drivers, firemen and fitters handed in their notices, sick of the injustices and financial penalties being inflicted on them and in the hope that Gooch would be forced to resign. The board backed Gooch and the 178 men were blacklisted from future railway employment with replacement staff being recruited from other railway companies.

Gooch stayed at the ECR until 1856 when the shareholders finally worked out what was going on and both he and Waddington did not have their contracts renewed. At this point, he would only have been aged 44 and according to his obituary printed in the journal of the Institution of Civil Engineers "he did little practical work during the past forty years, enjoying country life in his Berkshire home".

==== ECR locomotives ====
Under Viret's tenure at the ECR six classes of locomotive were introduced including the first locomotive actually built at Stratford Works in 1851. The classes were as follows:

Builder	Wheel Arrangement	Number in service	Notes
E B Wilson (rebuilt by Gooch)	0-6-0	6	Known as "floating batteries" these were originally Crampton type 2-2-2-0 locomotives.
Brassey, Sharp, Stewart & Co., and Kitson & Cos	2-4-0	18	Build split between three contractors introduced 1855. Known as "Butterflies". (Note: Not mentioned in Swieszkowski article)
Brassey	2-2-2	6	Known as the C class & introduced 1855/56 – 6 more introduced by Gooch's successor.
Stratford Works/R B Longbridge (Bedlington)	2-2-2WT	6/3	Known as the A class introduced 1851. Steam Index states 4 built by Longbridge.
Stratford Works	2-2-2WT	16	Known as the B class – the last ten of these worked the London, Tilbury and Southend Railway on opening

== Shipping Interests ==
Gooch had interest in six ships (all colliers) and he was guilty of using ECR facilities at Lowestoft to repair his own ships.

The six ships were:

- Lady Berriedale - built John Scott Russell London in 1853, sunk 1868.
- The Eagle - built John Scott Russell in 1853, sunk 1870
- The Falcon (1)- built John Scott Russell in 1853 - wrecked off Lesbos in 1856 on its return from the Crimean War
- The Hawk - built John Scott Russell in 1854 - lost in a gale off Southwold in 1862
- The Vulcan - built James Laing, Sunderland in 1856. Sold August 1886 to Captain Edward Jenkins of Cardiff and sunk in Carbis Bay in 1894
- The Falcon (2) - built M Samuelson and Sons, Hull in 1862, but lost at sea in 1868 off Spain.

He was also a director for The Australian Auxiliary Steam Clipper Company, Ltd.

== Mining interests ==
He was a director for several mining companies including:

- Copper Queen United, Ltd.
- La Trinidad, Ltd.
- Mounts Bay Consols, Ltd.
- Tresavean Mines, Ltd.

== Family ==
Gooch was married twice: firstly, in June 1840, to Hannah Frances Handcock, daughter of Captain Elias Robinson Handcock, and secondly, on 16 March 1876, to Emily Mary Stonhouse, daughter of Reverend Charles Stonhouse. Gooch lived at Cooper's Hill, Bracknell, Berkshire.

His eldest child from his second marriage, Mabel Barbara, was born in 1877. His son Edward Sinclair Gooch (1879-1915) was a major in the Berkshire Yeomanry and killed in World War 1. He also had a second daughter named Ethel Mary who was born in 1882.

== Notes ==
Business positions
Preceded by Joseph Woods	Locomotive Superintendent of the London and South Western Railway; 1841–1850	Succeeded by Joseph Hamilton Beattie
Preceded by John Hunter	Locomotive Superintendent of the Eastern Counties Railway; 1850–1856	Succeeded by Robert Sinclair
