= LB&SCR C1 class =

- C1 class No.422 c. 1890
Type and origin
- Power type: Steam
- Designer: William Stroudley
- Builder: LBSCR Brighton Works
- Build date: 1882 (6), 1884 (3), 1887 (3)
Specifications
- Configuration
  - Whyte: 0-6-0
  - UIC: C n2
- Gauge: 4 ft 8 1/2 in (1,435 mm) standard gauge
- Driver dia.: 60 in (1.524 m)
- Wheelbase: 15 ft 3 in (4.65 m)
- Length: 48 ft 7 in (14.81 m)
- Loco weight: 40.35 long tons (41.00 t; 45.19 short tons)
- Fuel type: Coal
- Fuel capacity: 6.5 long tons (6.6 t; 7.3 short tons)
- Water cap.: 2,520 imp gal (11,500 L; 3,030 US gal)
- Firebox
  - Grate area: 20.9 sq ft (1.94 m^{2})
- Boiler pressure: 150 psi (10.34 bar; 1.03 MPa)
- Heating surface
  - Firebox: 101 sq ft (9.4 m^{2})
  - Tubes: 1,312 sq ft (121.9 m^{2})
- Cylinders: Two, inside
- Cylinder size: 18 1/4 in × 26 in (464 mm × 660 mm)
Performance figures
- Tractive effort: 18,400 lbf (81.85 kN)
Career
- Operators: LB&SCR
- Class: C1
- Withdrawn: 1907–1911, 1920, 1924
- Disposition: All scrapped

The London, Brighton and South Coast Railway (LB&SCR) C1 class was a type of 0-6-0 freight steam locomotive designed by William Stroudley.

== Construction and use ==
The twelve locomotives in the class were built by Brighton Works between 1882 and 1887, based upon Stroudley's disappointing C class 0-6-0 design of 1873–74, but incorporating a larger boiler. However, the new locomotives were not as successful as Stroudley's designs for passenger locomotives and no further examples were built. Their comparatively short lives were spent hauling freight trains on the LB&SCR. Most of the members of the class were withdrawn between 1907 and 1911, but two examples survived until 1920 and 1924 respectively. One locomotive (number 428) was sold to the Stratford-upon-Avon and Midland Junction Railway, and survived until June 1925.

== Accidents ==
On 11 March 1905, No. 425 ran into a turntable well.

== Locomotive Summary ==
C1 class fleet summary
Original Number	Built	2nd No.	Renumber date	Withdrawn
421	August 1882	691	December 1910	January 1911
422	September 1882	692	December 1910	January 1911
423	September 1882	—	—	November 1908
424	October 1882	—	—	November 1908
425	November 1882	—	—	August 1907
426	December 1882	—	—	September 1907
427	May 1884	—	—	March 1911
428	June 1884	—	—	November 1920
429	June 1884	—	—	August 1907
430	July 1887	—	—	September 1924
431	July 1887	—	—	August 1907
432	July 1887	—	—	December 1910
