= London, Brighton and South Coast Railway =

UK railway company, 1846–1922

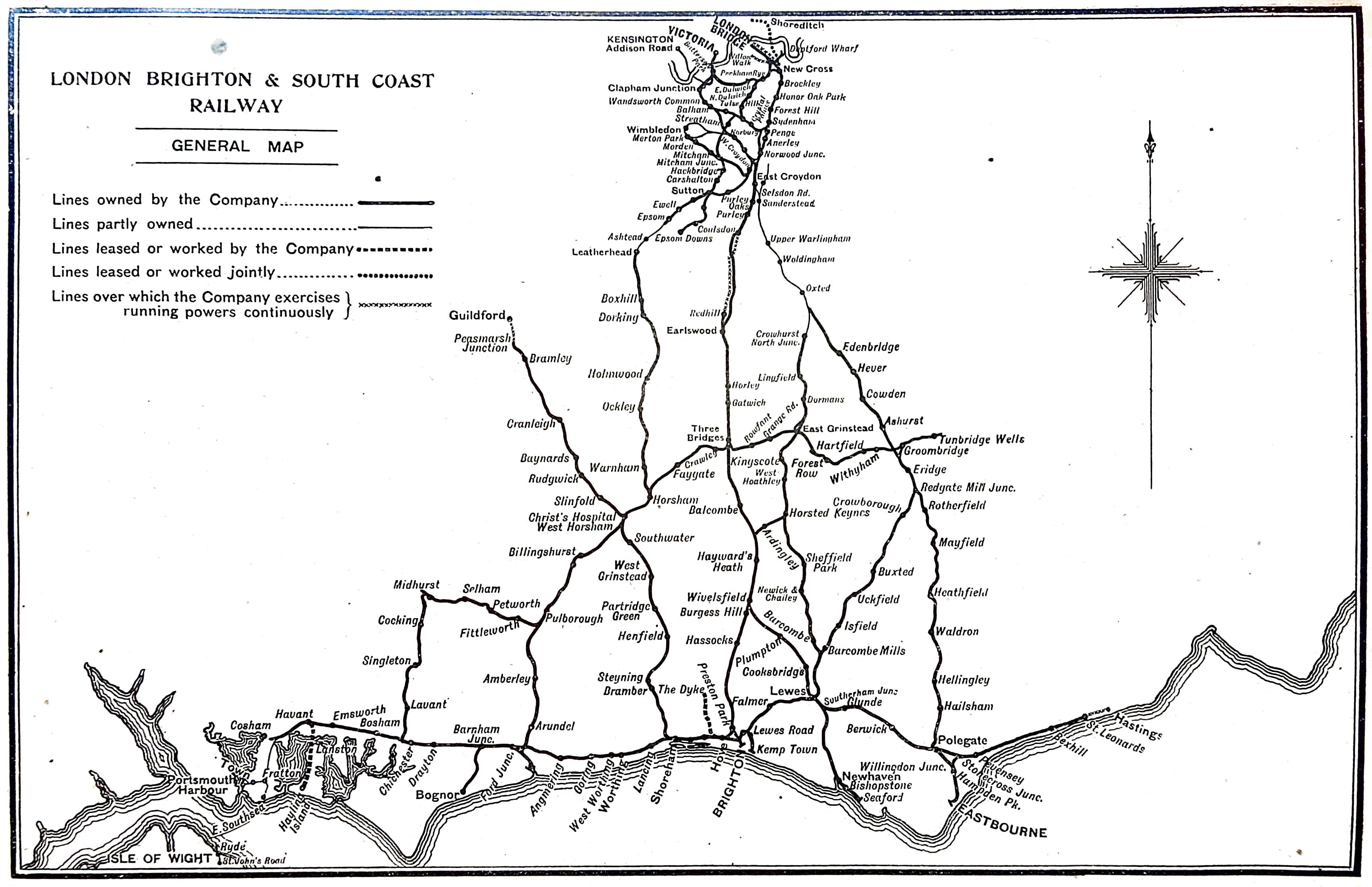
- 1920 map of the railway

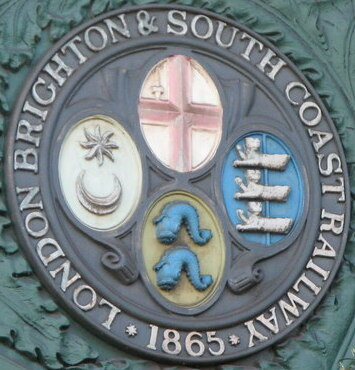
- The LB&SCR armorial device (Note: The cross and sword (top) represents London, the two dolphins (bottom) Brighton, the three half-lions half-ships (right) the Cinque Ports, and the star and crescent (left) Portsmouth.)

Overview
- Dates of operation: 27 July 1846– 1 January 1923

Technical
- Track gauge: 4 ft 8 1/2 in (1,435 mm)
- Length: 457 miles 20 chains (735.9 km) (1919)
- Track length: 1,264 miles 32 chains (2,034.9 km) (1919)

The London, Brighton and South Coast Railway (LB&SCR (known also as the Brighton line, the Brighton Railway or the Brighton)) was a railway company in the United Kingdom from 1846 to 1922. Its territory formed a rough triangle, with London at its apex, practically the whole coastline of Sussex as its base, covering a large part of Surrey. It was bounded on its western side by the London and South Western Railway (L&SWR), which provided an alternative route to Portsmouth. On its eastern side the LB&SCR was bounded by the South Eastern Railway (SER)—later one component of the South Eastern and Chatham Railway (SE&CR)—which provided an alternative route to Bexhill, St Leonards-on-Sea, and Hastings. The LB&SCR had the most direct routes from London to the south coast seaside resorts of Brighton, Eastbourne, Worthing, Littlehampton and Bognor Regis, and to the ports of Newhaven and Shoreham-by-Sea. It served the inland towns and cities of Chichester, Horsham, East Grinstead and Lewes, and jointly served Croydon, Tunbridge Wells (preserved as the Spa Valley Railway), Dorking and Guildford. At the London end was a complicated suburban and outer-suburban network of lines emanating from London Bridge and Victoria, and shared interests in two cross-London lines.

The LB&SCR was formed by a merger of five companies in 1846, and merged with the L&SWR, the SE&CR and several minor railway companies in southern England under the Railways Act 1921 to form the Southern Railway from 1 January 1923.

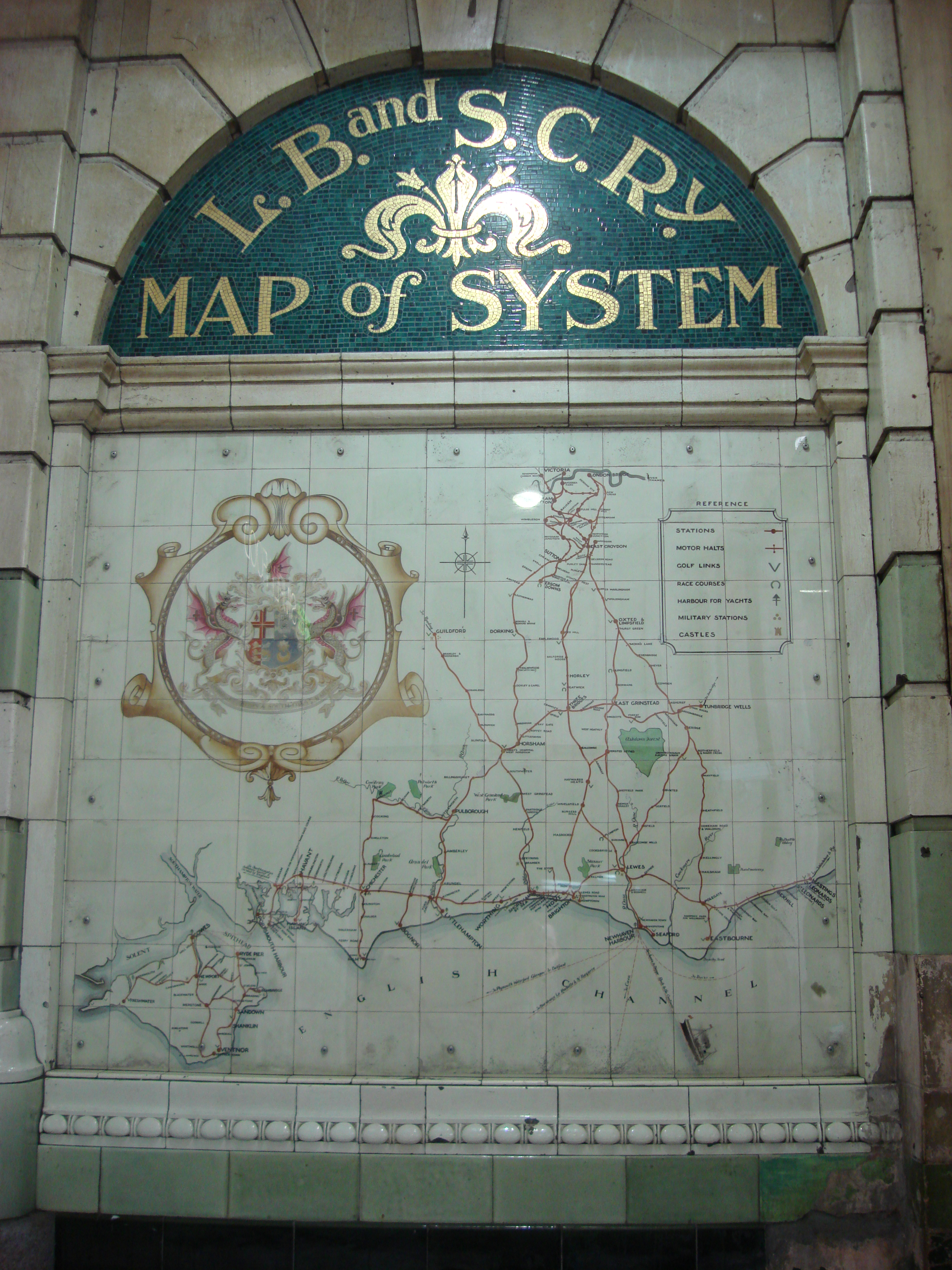
A map of the London, Brighton and South Coast Railway at London Victoria station

== Origins of the company ==
London and Brighton Railway Act 1846
- Act of Parliament
- Parliament of the United Kingdom
- Long title: An Act to consolidate and unite the London and Brighton and the London and Croydon Railway Companies and the Undertakings belonging to them.
- Citation: 9 & 10 Vict. c. cclxxxii

Dates
- Royal assent: 27 July 1846

The London, Brighton and South Coast Railway (LB&SCR) was formed by an act of Parliament, the London and Brighton Railway Act 1846 (9 & 10 Vict. c. cclxxxii), on 27 July, through the amalgamation of a number of railway companies:

- The London and Croydon Railway (L&CR), created in 1836 and opened in 1839.
- The London and Brighton Railway (L&BR), created in 1837 and opened in 1841.
- The Brighton and Chichester Railway, created in 1844 and opened in stages between November 1845 and June 1846, with an extension to Havant under construction at the time of amalgamation.
- The Brighton, Lewes and Hastings Railway, created in February 1844, opened in June 1846.
- The Croydon and Epsom Railway, created in July 1844, under construction at the time of amalgamation.

Only the first two were independent operating railways: the Brighton and Chichester and the Brighton, Lewes and Hastings had been purchased by the L&BR in 1845, and the Croydon and Epsom was largely owned by the L&CR.)

The amalgamation was brought about, against the wishes of the boards of directors of the companies, by shareholders in the L&CR and L&BR who were dissatisfied with the early returns from their investments.

The LB&SCR existed for 76 years until 31 December 1922, when it was wound up as a result of the Railways Act 1921 and merged with the London and South Western Railway and the South Eastern and Chatham Railway to form the Southern Railway.

=== Original routes ===
(Dates of opening from F. Burtt The Locomotives of the London Brighton and South Coast Railway 1839–1903.)

At the time of its creation the LB&SCR had around 170 route miles (274 km) in existence or under construction, consisting of three main routes and a number of branches.

The main line to Brighton from London Bridge opened in 1841. The sections between Corbett's Lane (New Cross) and London Bridge and between Croydon and Redhill were shared with the South Eastern Railway (SER). There were two branch lines under construction at the time of the amalgamation: the Sutton & Mole Valley Lines from Croydon to Epsom (opened 10 May 1847), and the Arun Valley Line from Three Bridges to Horsham (opened 14 February 1848).

The West Sussex coast line originated with a branch line from Brighton to Shoreham, opened 12 May 1840. This had been extended to Chichester by the time of the amalgamation, and a further extension to Havant was under construction (opened 15 March 1847), with the ultimate aim of extending the line to Portsmouth.

The East Sussex coast line from Brighton to Lewes and St Leonards-on-Sea, with running powers over the SER to Hastings, opened 27 June 1846, one month before the amalgamation, with branches to Newhaven (opened 8 December 1847), Eastbourne and Hailsham (opened 14 May 1849). A connecting spur from the Brighton main line at Keymer Junction near Haywards Heath to the Brighton–Lewes line was under construction at the time of amalgamation, opening in October 1847.

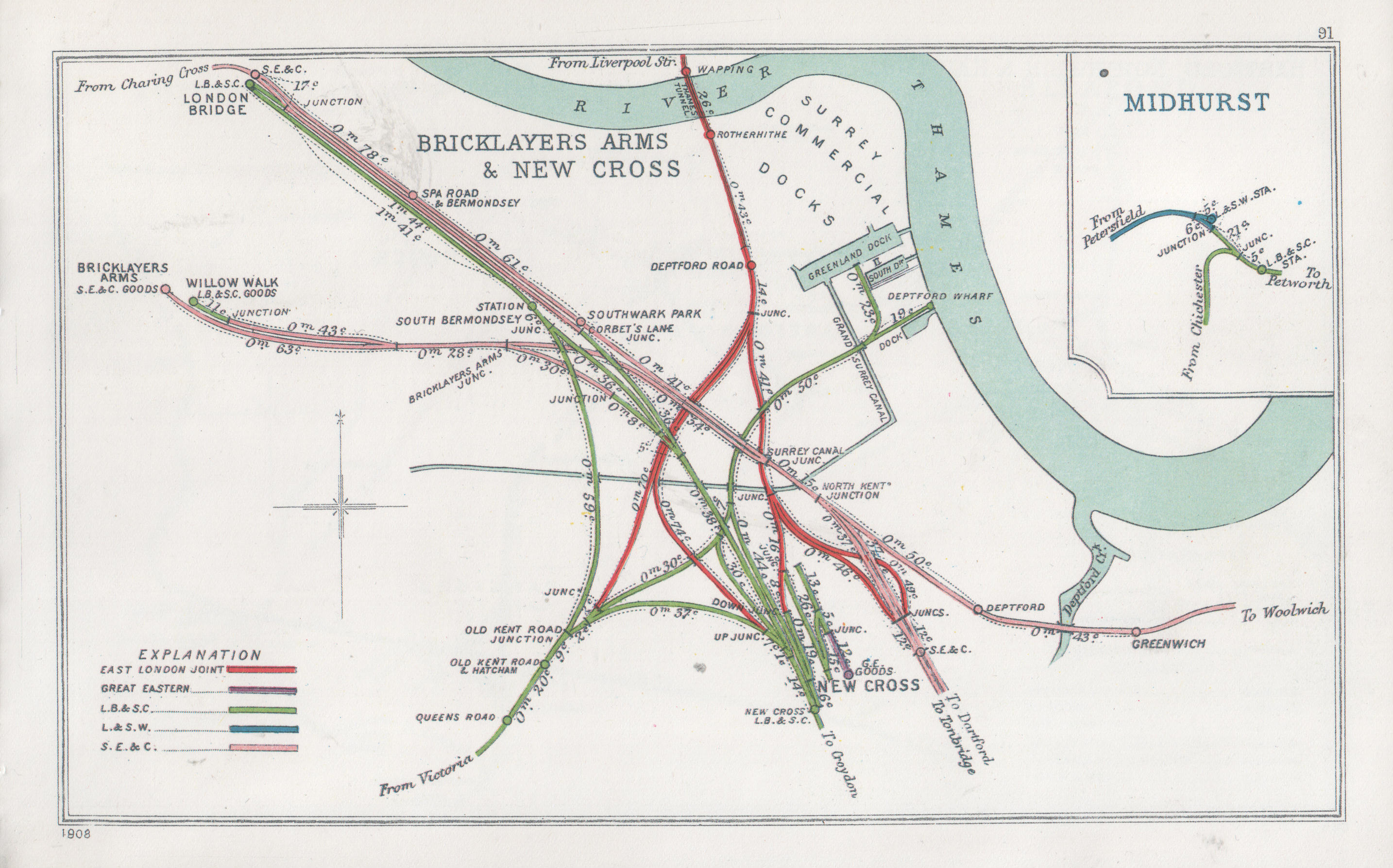
A 1908 Railway Clearing House map of lines around Bricklayers Arms and London Bridge station, as well as surrounding lines. LB&SCR lines are shown in green.

A short line from New Cross to Deptford Wharf, proposed by the L&CR, was approved in July 1846, shortly before amalgamation, but was not opened until 2 July 1849. The use of this line for passengers would have contravened the recently negotiated agreement with the SER that the LB&SCR would not operate lines to the east of its main line, and it was restricted to goods. A short branch from this line to the nearby Surrey Commercial Docks in Rotherhithe opened in July 1855.

=== London stations ===
The main London terminus was the L&CR station at London Bridge, built by the London and Greenwich Railway (L&GR) in 1836, and exchanged for the original L&CR station in 1842. For the first few years of its existence, LB&SCR trains used the L&GR lines from Corbett's Lane into London, but by 1849 the viaducts had been widened sufficiently for its own tracks.

The LB&SCR inherited from the L&CR running powers to the smaller SER passenger terminus at Bricklayers Arms. Poorly sited for passengers, it closed in 1852 and was converted into a goods station.

The LB&SCR owned three stations at Croydon, later East Croydon (former L&BR) Central Croydon and West Croydon (former L&CR).

=== Atmospheric lines ===
The L&CR had been partially operated by the atmospheric principle between Croydon and Forest Hill, as the first phase of a scheme to use this mode of operation between London and Epsom. However, following a number of technical problems, the LB&SCR abandoned atmospheric operation in May 1847. This enabled it to build its own lines into London Bridge, and have its own independent station there, by 1849.

The history of the LB&SCR can be studied in five distinct periods.

== Relations with neighbouring railways, and the beginnings of expansion 1846–1859 ==
The LB&SCR was formed at the same time as the bursting of the railway mania investment bubble, and so it found raising capital for expansion extremely difficult during the first years of its operation, other than to complete those projects that were already in hand. The L&BR had experienced difficult relations with the SER where the companies shared facilities, notably at Redhill and Hastings and on the approaches to London Bridge. In October 1849 the SER acquired the new Reading, Guildford and Reigate Railway (RG&RR) line, which the LB&SCR regarded as a major incursion into its territory. However, the LB&SCR had one important playing card not available to the L&BR—control of the SER main line between New Cross and Croydon. In 1849 the LB&SCR appointed a new and capable chairman, Samuel Laing, who negotiated a formal agreement with the SER that would resolve their difficulties for the time being and would define the territories of the two railways. Under this agreement the LB&SCR would have free access to London Bridge, Bricklayers Arms station and goods yard, and Hastings. The SER would have free use of the New Cross to Croydon line, and receive revenues from passengers at intermediate stations, but would not make or work competing lines to Brighton, Horsham, Chichester or Portsmouth.

In 1847 the naval dockyard of Portsmouth was being approached by two equally indirect routes from London, both under construction: a L&SWR route via Fareham and the former Brighton and Chichester Railway route from Havant. The two companies entered into an agreement in that year to share a line from Cosham on the mainland to Portsea Island, ending at the centre of Portsmouth town. Further progress towards the dockyard was prevented by Admiralty objections. The LB&SCR began its services between Chichester and Portsmouth, on 14 June 1847, and the L&SWR from Fareham in October 1848.

In 1853 the Direct Portsmouth Railway gained parliamentary authority to build a line from Godalming to Havant with the intention of the company selling itself either to the L&SWR or the LB&SCR. This scheme would provide a far more direct route to Portsmouth but involved sharing the LB&SCR tracks for the five miles (8 km) between Havant and the joint line to Portsea. The LB&SCR objected to the scheme but the L&SWR negotiated with the new company and in December 1858 sought to operate a train over the new route. The LB&SCR attempted to prevent the use of its tracks and the so-called 'battle of Havant' ensued. The matter was eventually resolved in the courts in August 1859, and relations between the railways were formalized in agreements of 1860 and 1862.

Samuel Laing had also approved a modest degree of expansion elsewhere, most notably the acquisition of a branch line from the main line at Three Bridges to the market town of East Grinstead in July 1855.

=== Crystal Palace Branch ===
Some of the directors of the LB&SCR were closely involved with the company that purchased The Crystal Palace after the completion of The Great Exhibition in October 1851 and arranged for its removal to a site on Sydenham Hill, close to the London to Brighton main line, which they purchased from Leo Schuster. The Crystal Palace became a major tourist attraction and the LB&SCR built a branch line from Sydenham to the new site, which was opened in June 1854, and enlarged London Bridge station to handle the additional traffic. The attraction proved to be an enormous success with 10,000 passengers conveyed daily to and from the new branch. On one day in 1859, 112,000 people were conveyed to Crystal Place by train, 70,000 of which from London Bridge.

== Rapid expansion 1856–1866 ==
Samuel Laing retired as chairman at the end of 1855 to pursue a political career, and was replaced by the merchant banker Leo Schuster, who had previously sold his 300-acre (120 ha) estate on Sydenham Hill to the new Crystal Palace Company. Schuster instituted a policy of rapidly expanding the route mileage of the railway with new routes throughout south London, Sussex, and east Surrey. Some of these were financed and built by the LB&SCR, others by independent local companies set up with the intention of connecting a town to the railway network with the intention of sale or lease to the LB&SCR. Schuster accelerated the rate of mileage increase after appointing Frederick Banister as chief engineer in 1860. As a result, a further 177 miles (285 km) were constructed or authorised between 1857 and 1865.

=== West End of London ===
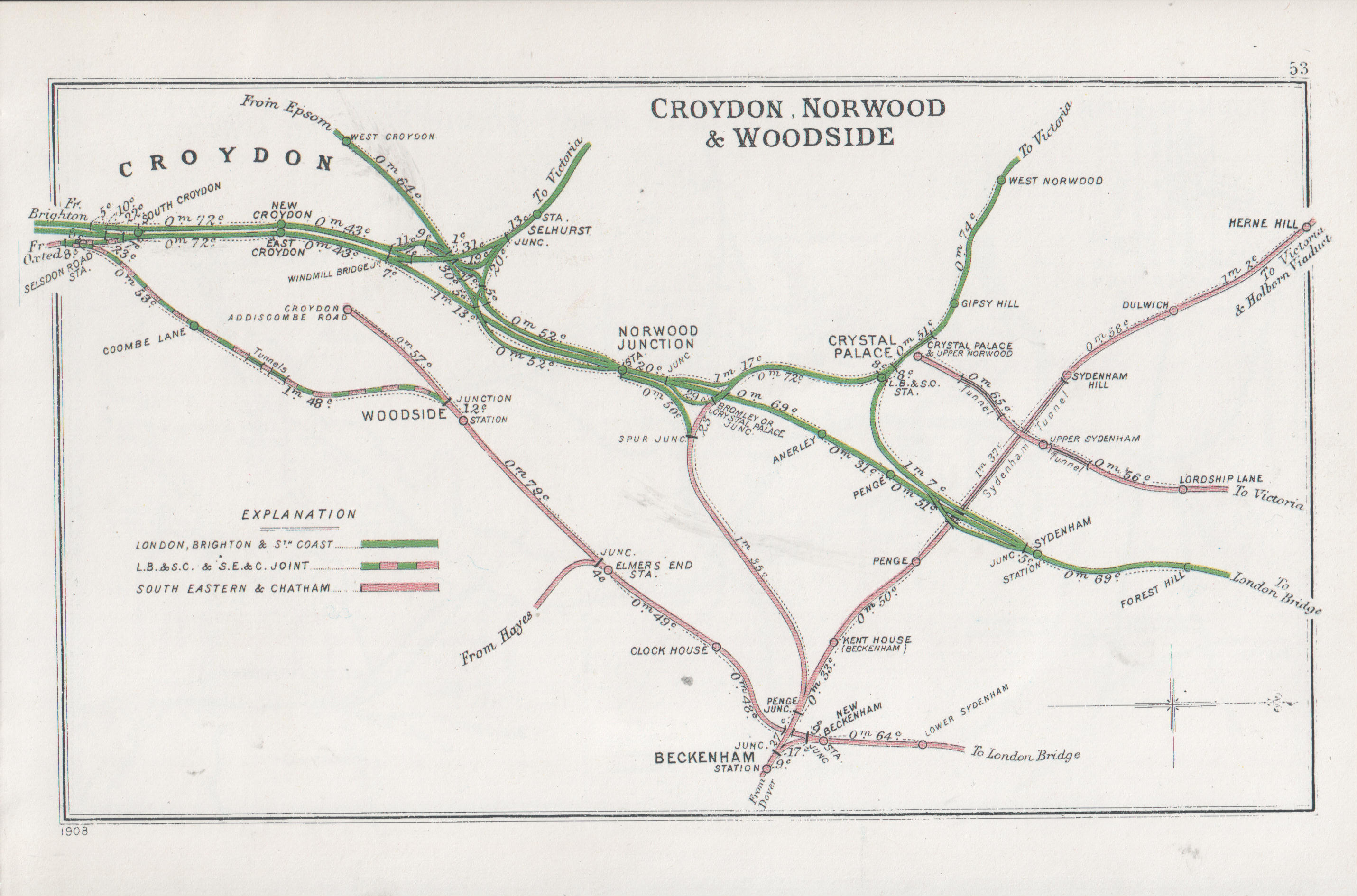
A 1908 Railway Clearing House map of lines around the Brighton Main Line between South Croydon and Selhurst

Schuster also encouraged an independent concern, the West End of London and Crystal Palace Railway (WEL&CPR), to construct a new line extending in a wide arc round south London from the LB&SCR Crystal Palace branch to Wandsworth in 1856 and to Battersea in 1858 with a temporary terminus at Battersea Pier. Shortly after this line was completed, the LB&SCR leased it from the WEL&CPR and incorporated it into its system.

Croydon and Balham Hill Railway Act 1860
- Act of Parliament
- Parliament of the United Kingdom
- Long title: An Act to authorize the London, Brighton, and South Coast Railway Company to make a Railway from the London, Brighton, and South Coast Railway in the Parish of Croydon to the West End of London and Crystal Palace Railway near Balham Hill, all in the County of Surrey, with a Branch Railway connected therewith; and for other Purposes.
- Citation: 23 & 24 Vict. c. cix

Dates
- Royal assent: 3 July 1860

Between 1858 and 1860 the LB&SCR was a major shareholder in the Victoria Station and Pimlico Railway (VS&PR), together with the East Kent Railway (later the London Chatham and Dover Railway (LC&DR)), the Great Western Railway (GWR) and the London and North Western Railway (LNWR). This enterprise constructed the Grosvenor Bridge over the River Thames at Battersea and the line to the Victoria Station, thereby creating a through (albeit roundabout) route from its main line near Croydon to a terminus in the West End of London. Following the acquisition of the WEL&CPR, a new 'cut-off' line between Windmill Bridge Junction (Norwood) and Balham was constructed during 1861 and 1862, which reduced the distance from East Croydon to Victoria.

=== New lines in South London ===
The VS&PR line was also connected with another joint venture the West London Extension Joint Railway, jointly financed by the LB&SCR, L&SWR, GWR and the L&NWR, to permit goods transfers between the companies and cross-London passenger trains. This line was opened in 1863, and in the same year the LB&SCR and L&SWR jointly opened a large interchange station named Clapham Junction. The LB&SCR also operated passenger trains between Clapham Junction and Addison Road.

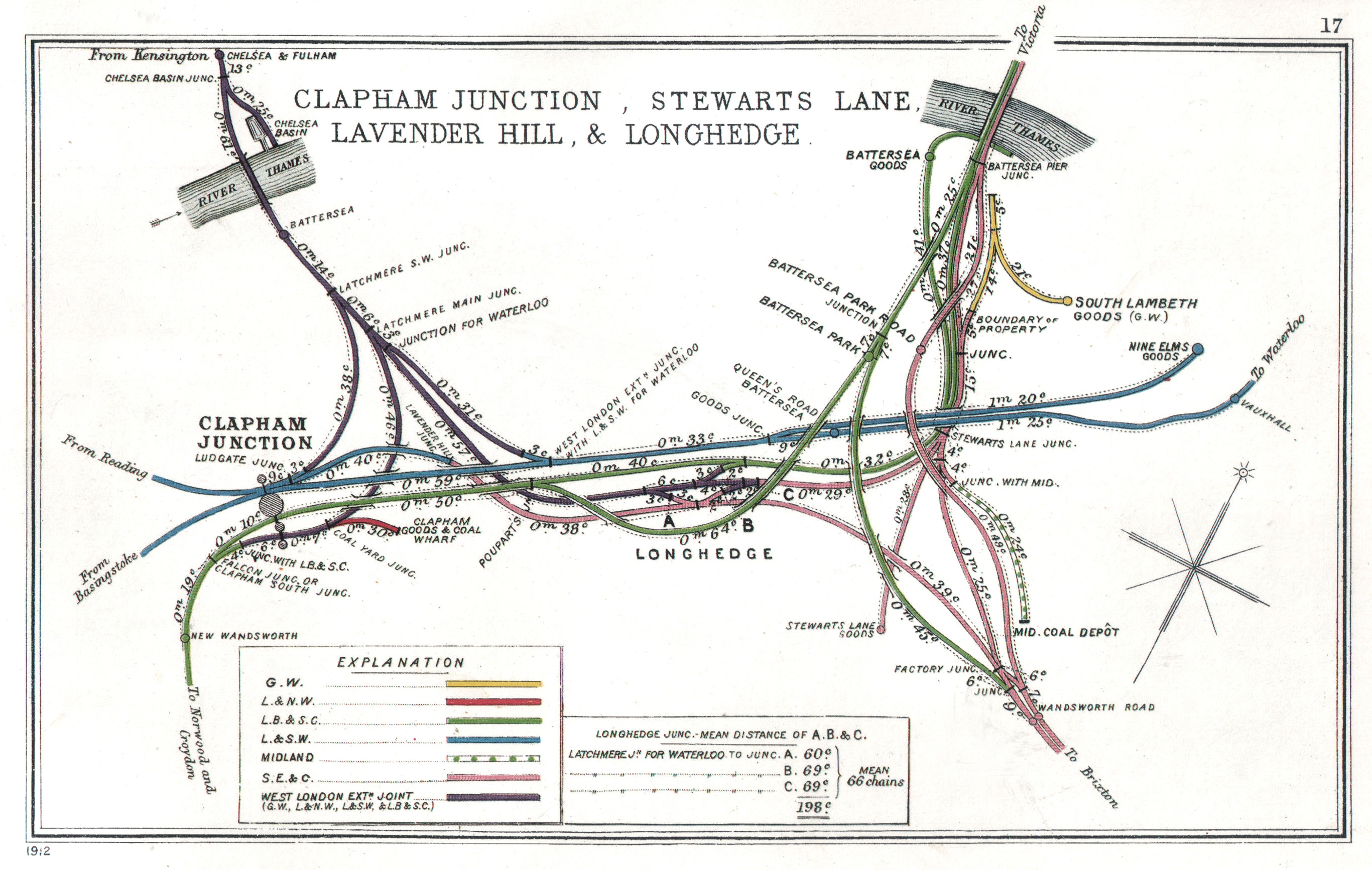
A 1912 Railway Clearing House map of lines around Clapham Junction and the approaches to Victoria

The West Croydon to Wimbledon Line was built as an independent railway joining the LB&SCR and the L&SWR main lines and opened in October 1855. For a few months it was operated under contract by its engineer George Parker Bidder but in 1856 it was leased to the LB&SCR who purchased it in 1858.

At the same time, the LB&SCR was cooperating with the LC&DR to create the South London line between its terminuses at London Bridge and Victoria. The LC&DR was used from Victoria to Brixton, followed by new construction by the LB&SCR through Denmark Hill, and Peckham to the main line to London Bridge at South Bermondsey.

=== New lines in Sussex ===
London, Brighton and South Coast Railway (Additional Powers) Act 1864
- Act of Parliament
- Parliament of the United Kingdom
- Long title: An Act to enable the London, Brighton, and South Coast Railway Company to make new Lines of Railway in the Counties of Surrey and Sussex; to acquire additional Lands; and to acquire the Undertakings of certain other Companies; and for other Purposes.
- Citation: 27 & 28 Vict. c. cccxiv

Dates
- Royal assent: 29 July 1864

Text of statute as originally enacted

London, Brighton, and South Coast Railway (Saint Leonards Line) Act 1865
- Act of Parliament
- Parliament of the United Kingdom
- Long title: An Act to enable the London, Brighton, and South Coast Railway Company to make new Railways from Saint Leonards to their Ouse Valley and Tunbridge Wells and Eastbourne Lines, and Deviations in those Lines; and for other Purposes.
- Citation: 28 & 29 Vict. c. l

Dates
- Royal assent: 26 May 1865

London, Brighton, and South Coast Railway (Saint Leonard's Deviations) Act 1866
- Act of Parliament
- Parliament of the United Kingdom
- Long title: An Act to enable the London, Brighton, and South Coast Railway Company to make new Railways in substitution for Portions of their Saint Leonard's Line, and other Works; and for other Purposes.
- Citation: 29 & 30 Vict. c. ccxxxiv

Dates
- Royal assent: 16 July 1866

Text of statute as originally enacted

During 1858, a branch line was built from Lewes to Uckfield, extended to Groombridge and Tunbridge Wells in 1868. In 1864 the Newhaven branch was extended to Seaford. The East Grinstead line was extended in 1866 to Groombridge and Tunbridge Wells. A large area in East Sussex between Tunbridge Wells and Eastbourne remained without railways, and the LB&SCR was anxious in case the SER should venture into this territory. As a result, in 1864 it sought powers to build a line between these two towns, which were granted in the London, Brighton and South Coast Railway (Additional Powers) Act 1864 (27 & 28 Vict. c. cccxiv). It also obtained powers for the Ouse Valley Railway, from the south of Balcombe and north of Haywards Heath on the Brighton main line to Uckfield and Hailsham; an extension to St Leonards was also approved by the London, Brighton, and South Coast Railway (Saint Leonards Line) Act 1865 (28 & 29 Vict. c. l) in May 1865. However, some work had been carried out by the end of 1866, but not completed.

In West Sussex the Horsham branch was extended to Pulborough and Petworth in 1859. In 1861 a line was built from near Horsham to Shoreham, providing a direct link to Brighton. Branches were built from the West Sussex coast line to Littlehampton in 1863, to connect with a new cross-channel ferry service, to Bognor Regis in 1864, and to Hayling Island in 1867. The line from Havant to Hayling had been built by the Hayling Railway, but it was leased to the LB&SCR in 1874.

Following the 1862 agreement with the L&SWR, a line was built from near Pulborough to a junction with the West Sussex coast line near Ford in 1863. This provided a shorter LB&SCR route from London to Portsmouth via Three Bridges and Horsham.

=== New lines in Surrey ===
The Epsom and Leatherhead Railway was an independent line from the L&SW main line at Wimbledon through Epsom and Leatherhead towards Guildford. The LB&SCR entered into an agreement to share its station at Epsom and to use the line as far as Leatherhead. The line opened in August 1859 and in 1860 this portion was transferred to the joint ownership of the LB&SCR and the L&SWR. The LB&SCR then bought the Banstead and Epsom Downs Railway, which was building a branch line from Sutton to Epsom Downs for Epsom Downs Racecourse, opened in May 1865.

The LB&SCR wished to connect Horsham with significant towns in Surrey, and in 1865 it opened a line between West Horsham and the L&SWR near Guildford. It constructed a line from Leatherhead to Dorking in March 1867, continued to Horsham two months later. This enabled alternative LB&SCR routes from London to Brighton and the West Sussex coast and further reduced the distance of its route from London to Portsmouth.

The LB&SCR supported the independent Surrey and Sussex Junction Railway, which obtained powers in July 1865 to build a line from Croydon to Tunbridge Wells via Oxted, to be worked by the LB&SCR. The involvement of LB&SCR directors in this scheme was interpreted by the SER as a breach of the 1849 agreement, and in retaliation the SER and LC&DR obtained the South Eastern and London, Chatham and Dover (London, Lewes and Brighton) Railways Act 1866 (29 & 30 Vict. c. cccxviii) for a rival 'London, Lewes and Brighton Railway', which would undermine the profitable LB&SCR monopoly to that town. Neither scheme was proceeded with.

=== Newhaven Harbour ===
Following the opening of the branch from Lewes to Newhaven, the LB&SCR sought to develop a shorter Continental route from London to Paris via Dieppe, in competition with the SER routes from Dover to Calais and Folkestone to Boulogne. The LB&SCR built its wharf and warehousing facilities on the east side of the river, with Newhaven Harbour station. It funded the dredging of the channel and other improvements to the harbour between 1850 and 1878, to enable it to be used by larger cross-channel ferries, and in 1863 the LB&SCR and the Chemins de Fer de l'Ouest introduced the Newhaven–Dieppe passenger service. In 1878 the railway formed and underwrote the Newhaven Harbour Company and thereafter delegated responsibility for its operation to it.

=== Growth of the London suburbs ===
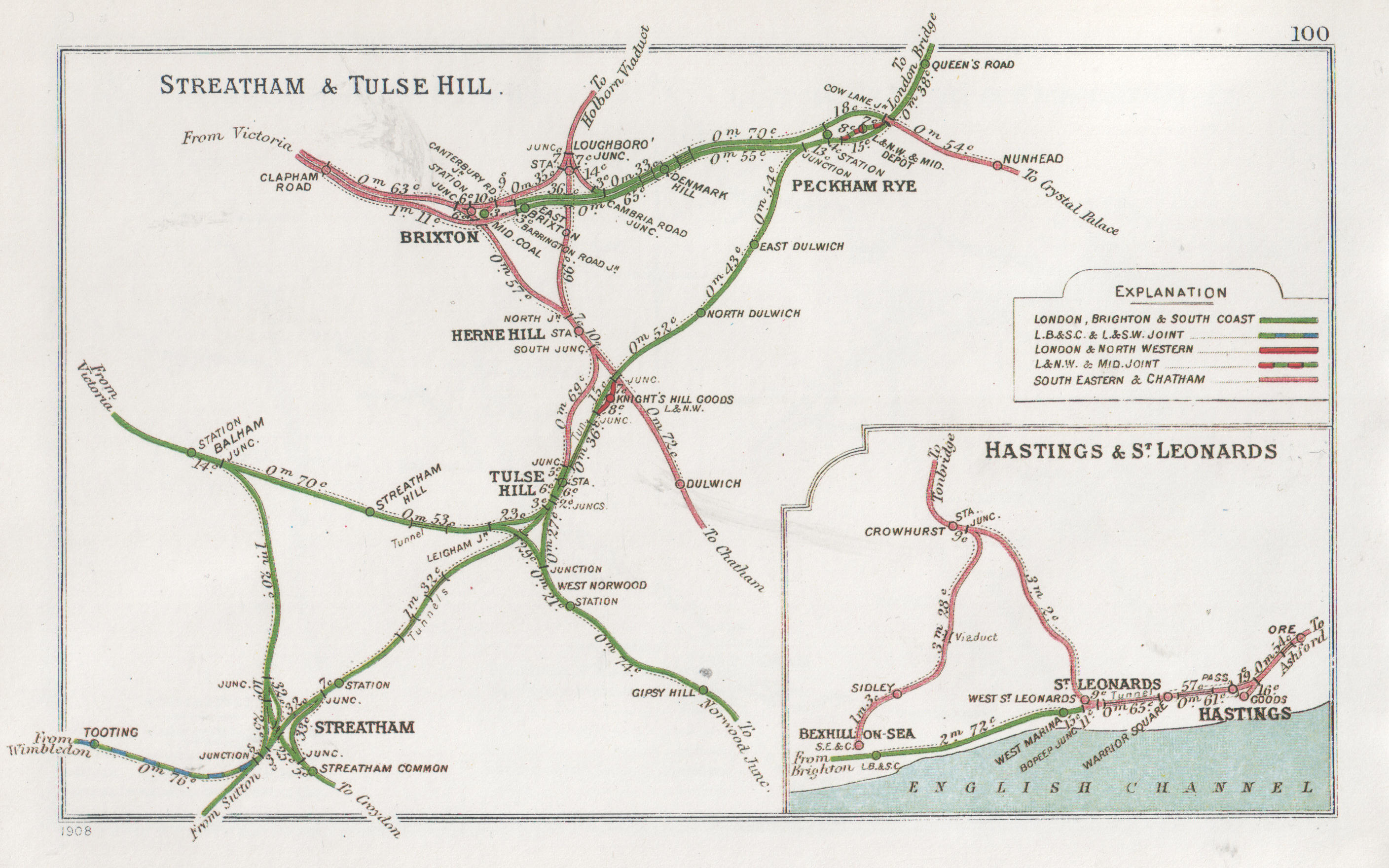
A 1908 Railway Clearing House map, showing the Sutton & Mole Valley Lines though South London

Largely as a result of the railway, the rural area between New Cross and Croydon rapidly became built up, and the population of Croydon increased 14-fold, from 16,700 to 233,000, during the LB&SCR's existence. During the 1860s the LB&SCR began to develop new traffic from the growing number of middle-class commuters who were beginning to live in the south London suburbs and working in central London.

As part of its suburban expansion, the LB&SCR built a line from Peckham Rye roughly parallel to the main line, through East Dulwich, Tulse Hill, Streatham and Mitcham to Sutton and Epsom Downs, which opened in October 1868.

=== Deterioration of relations with the SER ===
Relations between the LB&SCR and the SER and the interpretation of the 1848 agreement continued to be difficult throughout the 1850s and 1860s. They reached a low point in 1863 when the SER produced a report for its shareholders outlining a long list of the difficulties between the two companies, and the reasons why they considered that the LB&SCR had broken the 1848 agreement.

The main areas of disagreement listed were at Hastings, allowing the LC&DR to use its lines to Victoria, a proposed LB&SCR branch to Bromley, the new LB&SCR line to Dorking, LB&SCR opposition to the SER attempts at building a line to the west end, the LB&SCR agreement to let the LC&DR use its goods facilities at Bricklayers Arms, and the perennial problem of the shared main line between Redhill and Croydon.

The most flagrant example of the lack of cooperation between the two companies, however, was with respect to the independent Caterham Railway, which ran in South Eastern territory, but joined the Brighton mainline at the LB&SCR Godstone Road station (later renamed Caterham Junction). Both companies objected to the other operating the branch line, which resulted in a delay of a year between the completion of the work and the opening of the line in 1856. Their failure to agree on such matters as through ticketing quickly drove the independent company into bankruptcy. Even after the SER took over running of the branch in 1859, the squabbling and bloody mindedness continued to the great detriment of the passengers. Eventually the matters reached the leader columns of The Times newspaper in 1862 before the companies would negotiate with one another.

The chronic congestion over the shared line between East Croydon railway station and Redhill eased after 1 May 1868 when the route ceased to be on the South Eastern Main Line to Dover following the opening of the 'Sevenoaks cut off' line between St Johns and Tonbridge railway station. A ten-year agreement between the SER and the LB&SCR over the use of the station and lines to Coulsdon was signed 1 February 1869 and renewed ten years later.

== 1867 financial crisis and its impact ==
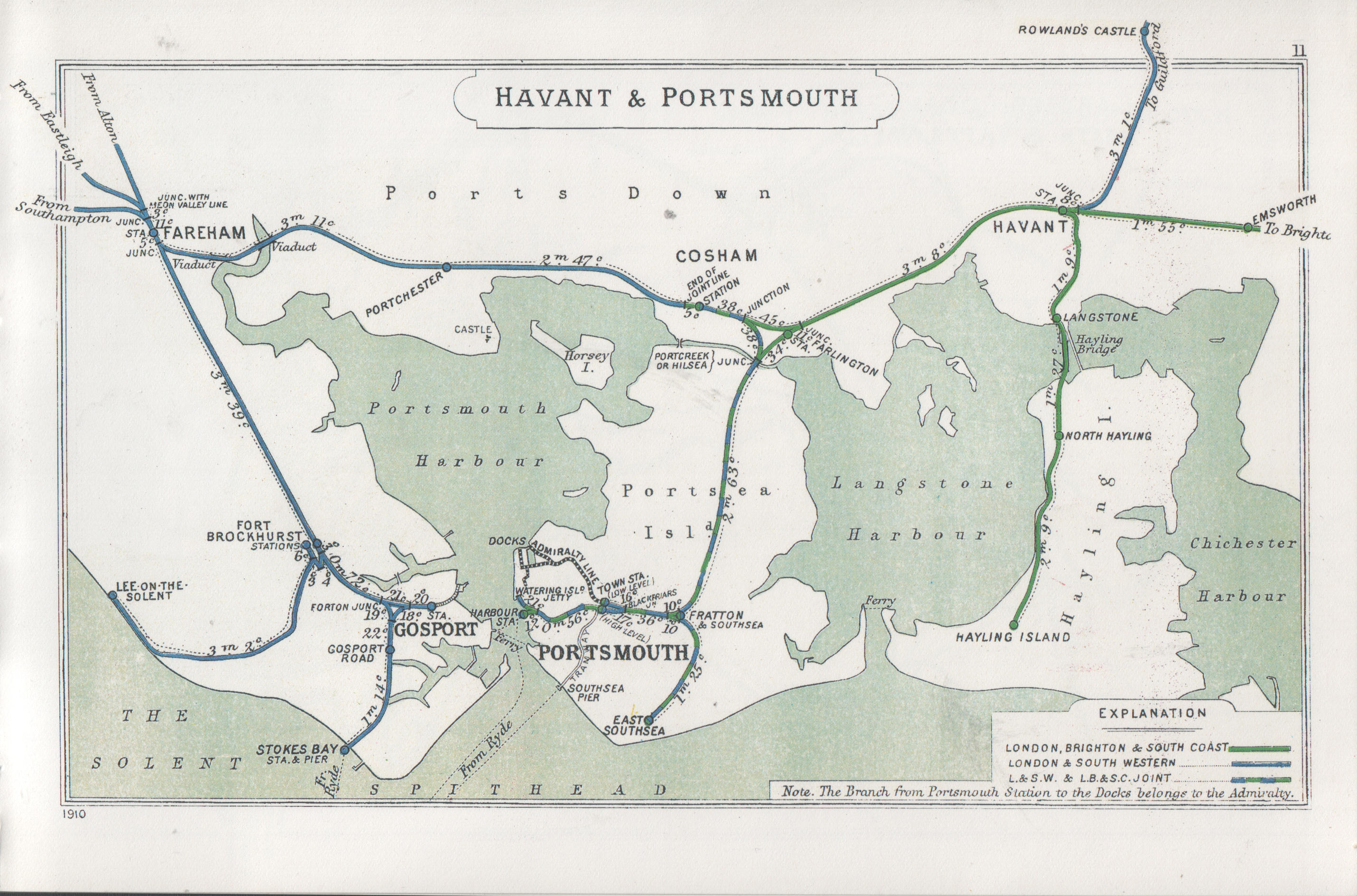
A 1910 Railway Clearing House map, showing part of the lines around Portsmouth

The collapse of the bankers Overend, Gurney and Company in 1866 and the financial crisis the following year brought the LB&SCR to the brink of bankruptcy. A special meeting of shareholders was adjourned, and the powers of the board of directors were suspended pending receipt of a report into the financial affairs of the company and its prospects. The report made clear that the LB&SCR had overextended itself with large capital projects sustained by profits from passengers, which suddenly declined as a result of the crisis. Several country lines were losing money – most notably between Horsham and Guildford, East Grinstead and Tunbridge Wells, and Banstead and Epsom – and the LB&SCR was committed to building or acquiring others with equally poor prospects. The report was extremely critical of the policies of Schuster and the company secretary, Frederick Slight, both of whom resigned. It did however point out that these lines had been built or acquired as a means for preventing competition from neighbouring railways. The committee recommended the abandonment of several projects, and that the LB&SCR should enter into a working agreement with the SER.

The new board of directors accepted many of these recommendations, and they managed to persuade Samuel Laing to return as chairman. It was through his business acumen and that of the new secretary and general manager J. P. Knight that the LB&SCR gradually recovered its financial health during the early 1870s.

As a result, all construction of lines was suspended. Three important projects then under construction were abandoned: the Ouse Valley Railway, its extension to St Leonards, and the Surrey and Sussex Junction Railway. The line between Tunbridge Wells and Eastbourne was shelved until the financial situation improved. For the next decade, projects were limited to additional spurs or junctions in London and Brighton to enhance the operation of the network, or small-scale ventures in conjunction with other railway companies. The latter included a short line from Streatham through Tooting to Wimbledon in 1868, and a connection from Portsmouth Town to Portsmouth Harbour in 1876, both jointly with the L&SWR.

The proposed 'working cooperation' with the SER never took effect but remained under active consideration by both parties, and later involved the LC&DR. It was not until 1875 that the idea was dropped, after the SER pulled out of negotiations due to the conditions imposed by Parliament on the proposed merger. The LB&SCR continued as an independent railway but the SER and LCDR eventually formed a working relationship in 1899 with the formation of the South Eastern and Chatham Railway.

One new line to which the LB&SCR was committed was the East London Railway, a consortium of six railway companies: the Great Eastern Railway (GER); the LB&SCR; the LC&DR; the SER; the Metropolitan Railway; and the District Railway. It sought to reuse the Thames Tunnel, built by Marc and Isambard Kingdom Brunel between 1825 and 1843. A line was therefore built between the LB&SCR at New Cross and Wapping with a link to the GER main line, in March 1869. It was primarily intended for goods transfer between these railways, but the LB&SCR introduced a passenger service between Liverpool Street Station and Croydon.

== Later 19th century ==
London, Brighton, and South Coast Railway (Various Powers) Act 1878
- Act of Parliament
- Parliament of the United Kingdom
- Long title: An Act to confer further powers upon the London, Brighton, and South Coast Railway Company, and to enable them to purchase the Hayling Bridge and Causeway.
- Citation: 41 & 42 Vict. c. lxxiv

Dates
- Royal assent: 17 June 1878

Text of statute as originally enacted

By the mid-1870s the LB&SCR had recovered its financial stability through a policy of encouraging the more intensive use of lines and reducing operating costs. Between 1870 and 1889 annual revenue rose from £1.3 million to £2.4 million, whilst its operating costs rose from £650,000 to just over £1 million. The LB&SCR was able to embark upon new railway building and improvements to infrastructure. Some new lines passed through sparsely populated areas and merely provided shorter connections to towns that were already on the railway network, and so were unlikely to be profitable, but the LB&SCR found itself under pressure from local communities wanting a rail connection, and was frightened that they would otherwise be developed by rivals.

The main reason for the financial recovery lay in the exploitation of London suburban traffic. By the late 1880s the LB&SCR had developed the largest suburban network of any British railway, with 68 route miles (109 km) in the suburbs in addition to its main lines, in three routes between London Bridge and Victoria: the South London line, the outer South London Line and the Crystal Palace lines, and the LB&SCR was earning more from season tickets than any other British railway. Thus an official return showed that the railway had operated more than 100,000 passenger trains from April to June 1889, more than any other company operating only in southern England.

=== New routes and station improvements ===
London, Brighton, and South Coast Railway (Croydon, Oxted, and East Grinstead Railways) Act 1878
- Act of Parliament
- Parliament of the United Kingdom
- Long title: An Act to enable the London, Brighton, and South Coast Railway Company to complete and construct Railways between Croydon, Oxted, and East Grinstead, and to acquire the Lewes and East Grinstead Railway; to confer powers on the South-eastern Railway Company; and for other purposes.
- Citation: 41 & 42 Vict. c. lxxii

Dates
- Royal assent: 17 June 1878

Text of statute as originally enacted

The scheme to link Eastbourne with Tunbridge Wells was revived in April 1879 with the opening of a line connecting the Hailsham branch to Heathfield, completed the following September from Heathfield to Eridge, and later known as the Cuckoo Line.

Authority was granted to the Lewes and East Grinstead Railway (L&EGR) by the Lewes and East Grinstead Railway Act 1877 (40 & 41 Vict. c. ccxviii), to build a line roughly parallel to the 'Cuckoo Line', sponsored by local landowners, including the Earl of Sheffield, and including a branch from Horsted Keynes to Haywards Heath on the Brighton main line. A year later the London, Brighton, and South Coast Railway (Croydon, Oxted, and East Grinstead Railways) Act 1878 (41 & 42 Vict. c. lxxii) enabled the LB&SCR to acquire and operate lines, opened in August 1882 and September 1883. The East Grinstead–Lewes line subsequently became known as the 'Bluebell line' and, following its closure in 1958, the section between Horsted Keynes and Sheffield Park was taken over by the Bluebell Railway Preservation Society.

The LB&SCR in West Sussex was largely complete by 1870 except for a link between Midhurst and Chichester, delayed by the financial crisis of 1867; this was revived and opened in 1881. Minor improvements around Littlehampton were made, and a branch to Devil's Dyke opened in 1887, built by and owned by an independent company but operated by the LB&SCR. In Hampshire the LB&SCR leased the Hayling Island branch line from 1874, opened in 1865 as an independent concern. The LB&SCR and the L&SWR jointly built a 1 1/4-mile (2 km) branch from a new station on their existing joint line at Fratton to East Southsea in 1887, but early in the 20th century had to compete with a tramway, and it was closed at the outbreak of the First World War in August 1914.

Although the proposed Surrey and Sussex Junction Railway had been abandoned in 1867, there remained a demand from Croydon to towns such as East Grinstead, Tunbridge Wells and the East Sussex coast. The SER was looking for a relief route in the same general direction for its Tonbridge and Hastings services, and the two railways collaborated in a joint line between South Croydon, on the main Brighton line, and Oxted. Beyond Oxted, the LB&SCR would build its own lines to link with the Bluebell line at East Grinstead and its line to Tunbridge Wells. SER trains would join the line between Redhill and Tonbridge. Authority was granted in 1878 and they opened in 1884.

Brighton railway station was rebuilt and extended in 1882–83 with a new single roof, and Eastbourne was rebuilt in 1886 to cope with additional traffic.

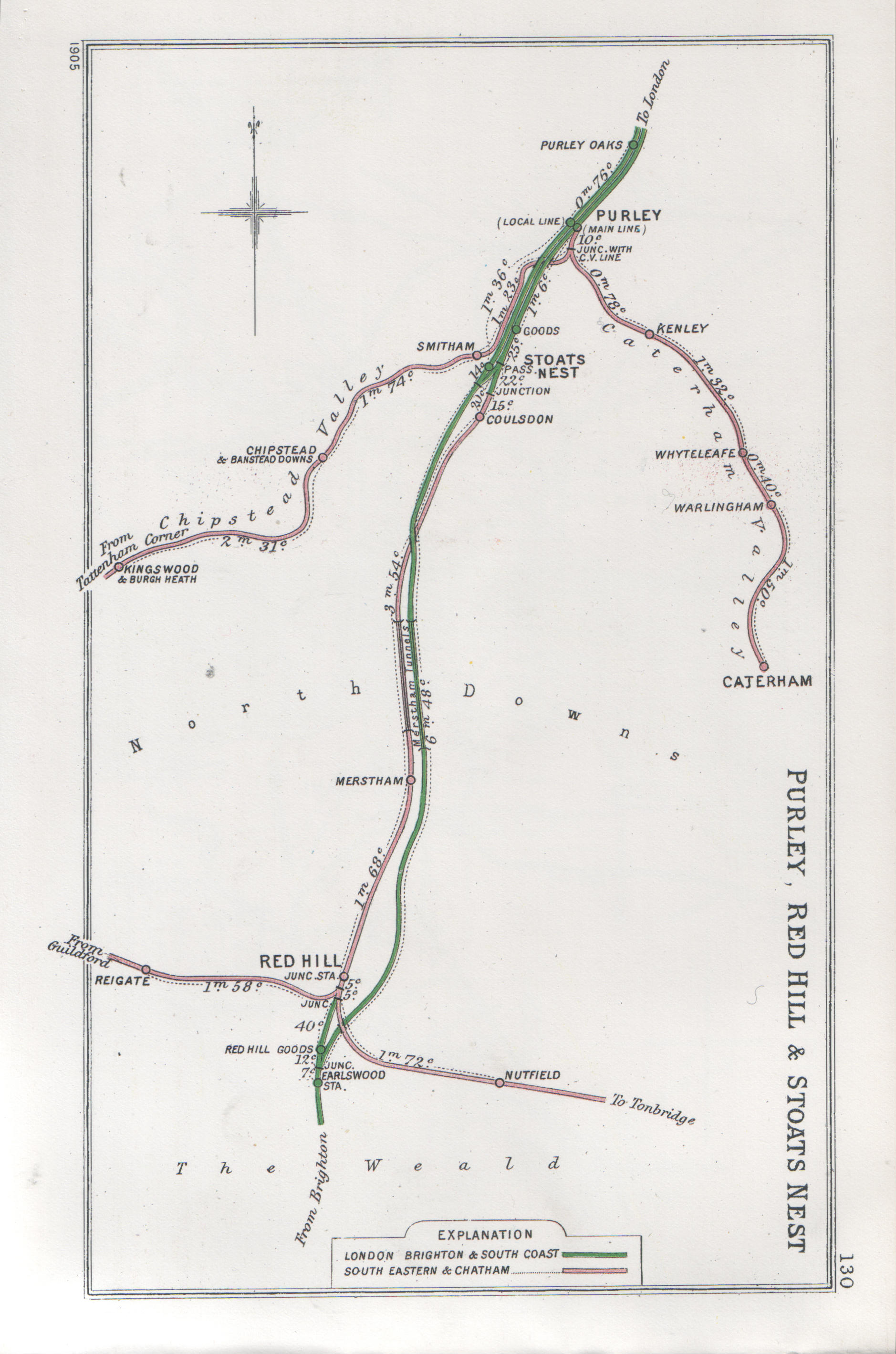
1905 Map showing the LB&SCR "Quarry line" and the original SER line

=== Congestion and slow trains ===
With the steady growth of traffic in the South London suburbs during the 1880s and early 1890s, the LB&SCR was the subject of press criticism for poor timekeeping and slow trains, although it was never subjected to the levels of press and public obloquy accorded to the SER. Two of the reasons for poor timekeeping were the volume of traffic generated and the complexity of the LB&SCR network north of Redhill with large numbers of junctions and signals. A further complication was that both the LB&SCR and the SER shared the 11 miles (18 km) of track between Redhill and East Croydon. This part of the line was owned by the SER, which (according to Acworth) gave its trains precedence through the junctions at Redhill, but the LB&SCR paid an annual fee of £14,000 for its use. Relations with the SER began to deteriorate once more and eventually both companies appointed Henry Oakley general manager of the Great Northern Railway as an independent assessor in 1889. Oakley supported the LB&SCR right to use the line but increased the annual payment to £20,000. However this did not solve the problem and an 1896 study of LB&SCR passenger services, by J. Pearson Pattinson described the 8 1/4 miles (13.3 km) of shared track between Redhill and Stoats Nest (Coulsdon) as being 'in a state of the utmost congestion, and detentions of the Brighton expresses, blocked by South Eastern stopping trains, are as constant as irritating.'

==== Quarry line ====
Ultimately the only solution was for the LB&SCR to build its own line between Coulsdon North and Earlswood, bypassing Redhill, which became known as the 'Quarry line'. Plans were drawn up by Charles L. Morgan, the chief engineer. Authority was granted by Parliament in July 1896, and construction took place in 1898–99. The line involved substantial civil engineering works including the excavation of new tunnels at Merstham and Redhill, cuttings, embankments and a covered way at Cane Hill Hospital. The line opened on 8 November 1899 (1 April 1900 for passengers).

== 20th century ==
During its last 20 years the LB&SCR opened no new lines, but invested in improving its main line and London terminals, together with the electrification of its London suburban services.

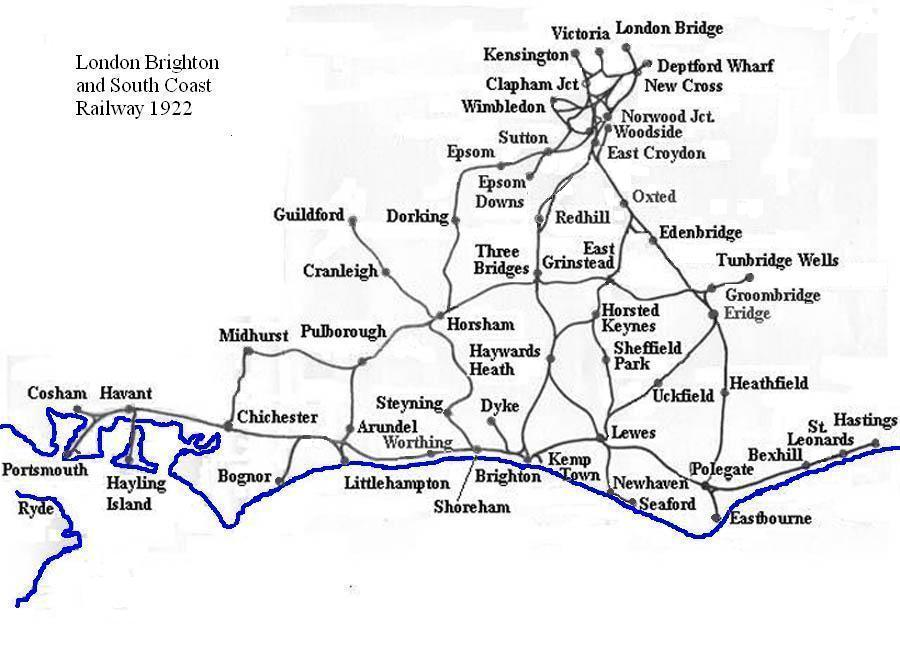
Sketch map of LB&SCR routes in 1922

Following the completion of the Quarry line, the bottleneck on the heavily used main line moved further south. Plans were drawn up for the quadrupling throughout, but only the 16 miles (26 km) from Earlswood to Three Bridges were completed, between 1906 and 1909. A fifth track was laid between Norwood Junction and South Croydon in 1907–08. Extension beyond Three Bridges would have involved heavy engineering at Balcombe tunnel, over the Ouse Valley Viaduct and through the South Downs. The required capital expenditure was diverted to extending the electrification programme.

Unlike other mainline railway companies, the LB&SCR had to share both its London termini with its rivals, London Bridge with the SER and Victoria with the LC&DR. The rapid increase in commuting towards the end of the 19th century created an urgent need to expand the cramped and limited facilities at Victoria. During the first decade of the new century the line between Grosvenor Bridge and Victoria was widened and the station rebuilt on a much larger scale. A new turntable and locomotive servicing facilities enabled the use of more powerful locomotives. During the same period LB&SCR facilities at London Bridge were enlarged, but since the station had been rebuilt so many times it remained a 'sprawling confusion'.

=== Motive power shortage ===
Between 1905 and 1912 the LB&SCR suffered an increasingly serious motive power shortage due to the inability of Brighton Works to keep pace with the volume of repairs and new construction required. By 1910 30% of the locomotive stock was unusable due to delays and inefficiencies at the works, leading to the sickness and retirement of the Locomotive, Carriage and Wagon Superintendent D. E. Marsh. The problem was solved by the establishment of Lancing Carriage Works and the reorganisation of Brighton Works by Marsh's successor L. B. Billinton.

=== The First World War ===
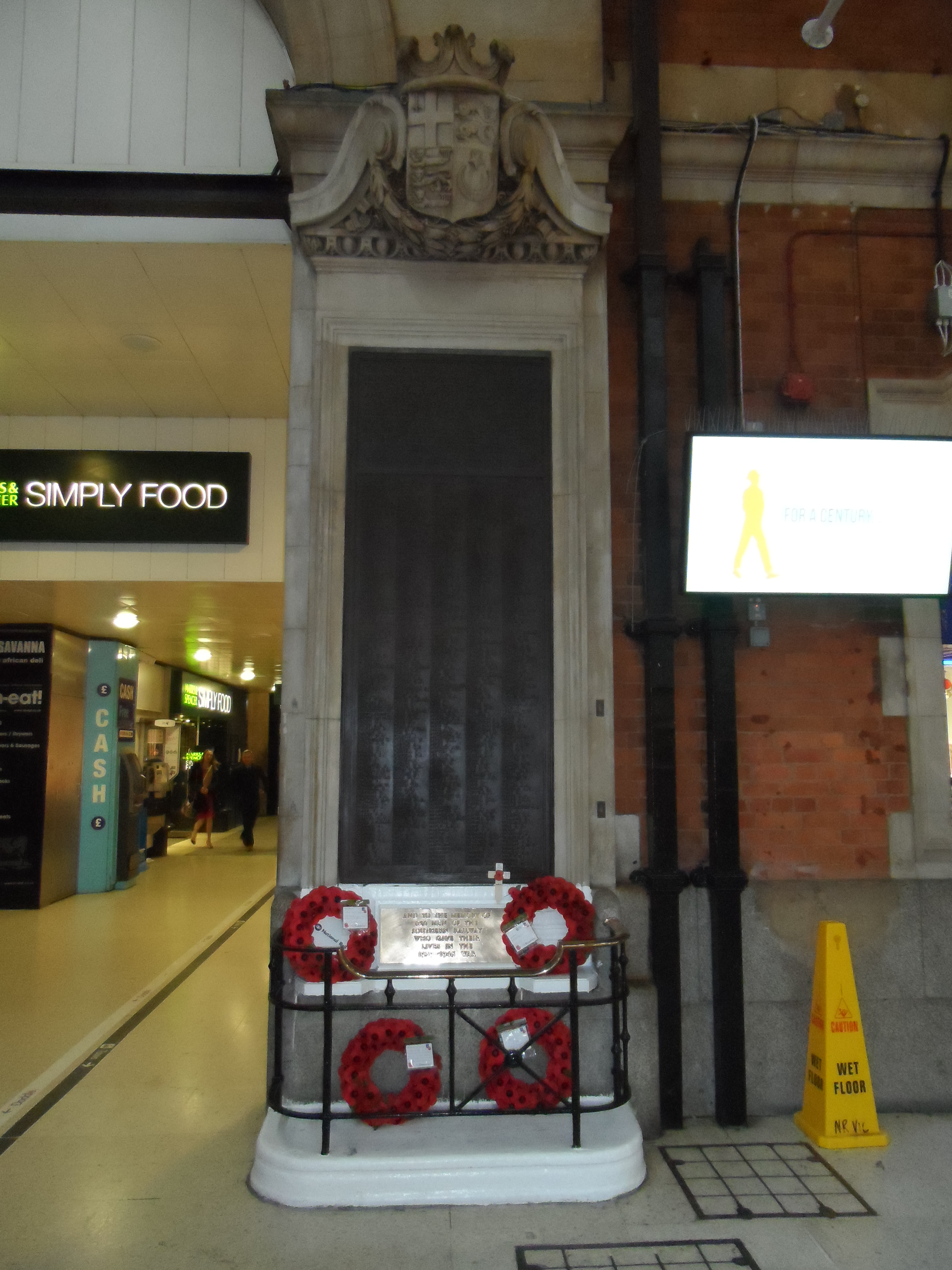
The LB&SCR War Memorial, London Victoria Station

With other British railways the LB&SCR was brought under government control during the First World War. Until then it had carried relatively little heavy goods, but this changed dramatically at the outbreak of war. The LB&SCR was responsible for carrying the bulk of the stores and munitions delivered to the British troops on the continent, principally through its port of Newhaven This included nearly 7 million tons of goods, including 2.7 million tons of explosives. It necessitated an additional 53,376 goods trains over the four years of the war.

Newhaven harbour also received casualties landing in hospital ships, with the railway providing ambulance trains. There were several army camps within the territory of the LB&SCR which therefore provided 27,366 troop trains. Army horses awaiting shipping to France were stabled at Farlington Racecourse.

At the outbreak of hostilities the area surrounding Newhaven Port was requisitioned and the Harbour station closed. From 22 September 1916 Newhaven became a special military area for handling Government traffic under the Defence of the Realm Regulations.

This additional traffic required substantial improvements to infrastructure, notably at Newhaven harbour, where additional warehousing, new sidings and signalling constructed and electric lighting was installed. When Newhaven became overwhelmed the tidal port of Littlehampton was rebuilt and pressed into service. Inland, a much enlarged goods marshalling yard was established at Three Bridges, which was chosen as a nodal point for handling War traffic. At Gatwick and Haywards Heath, passing loops were constructed so that the frequent passenger trains would not be impeded by slower goods trains and to hold munitions trains during air raids. Some munitions trains were routed to Newhaven via the Steyning Line to Brighton to avoid congesting the part of the Brighton main line which had only two tracks. Between 1914 and 1918, 5,635 members of LB&SCR staff joined the forces, creating staff shortages at all levels (including the Chief Mechanical Engineer who was called up for service in Russia and Romania). This necessitated the employment of female labour in clerical grades and for carriage cleaning. The railway erected a War Memorial at London Bridge in 1920 honouring the 532 staff who had lost their lives. Likewise, in April 1922, the last locomotive to be constructed by the company, 4-6-4T 'L' Class No. 333, was named 'Remembrance' and carried a memorial plaque.

=== LB&SCR at Grouping ===
By 31 December 1922, when the LB&SCR ceased to have an independent existence, it had 457 miles (735 km) of route. Of these, 100 mi (161 km) was single track, 357 mi (575 km) double track, 47 mi (76 km) triple track, and 49 mi (79 km) four or more tracks. Sidings had a total length of 355 miles (571 km). According to Bonavia, 'the Brighton was a highly individual line in its strengths and weaknesses, it was to experience drastic changes under Southern [Railway] management which older members of the staff would not always accept gracefully.'

== Train services ==
The LB&SCR was essentially a passenger-carrying concern, with goods and mineral traffic playing a limited role in its receipts. As originally envisaged the railway was a trunk route, conveying passengers (and to a lesser extent goods) between London, Croydon and the south coast, with relatively little traffic to and from stations in between. However, the railway's existence began to generate new goods and passenger traffic at towns and villages on or near the main line, such as Reigate, Crawley and Haywards Heath. This also applied to Sussex and Surrey market towns such as Lewes, Horsham, East Grinstead and Dorking as soon as these were connected to the rail network. After 1870 the development of the London suburbs south of the Thames had a profound effect on the nature of the railway. The development of Newhaven harbour was also a stimulus to the development of both categories of traffic.

The speed and punctuality of many LB&SCR passenger services was the subject of widespread criticism in the technical and popular press during the 1890s. This was in part due in part to the complexity of the system between London and Croydon, with a large number of signals and junctions, the sharing of stretches of line with the SER, and the relatively short routes, which gave little opportunity to make up for lost time. The LB&SCR gradually began to rebuild its reputation during the 20th century through improvements to mainline infrastructure and electrification of suburban services.

=== Express passenger services ===
The company had no long-distance express trains, with a maximum journey length of 75 miles (121 km). Nevertheless, frequent express passenger services ran to the most important coastal destinations from both London Bridge and Victoria. Season ticket revenue, particularly from Brighton to London, was the backbone of the LB&SCR's finances for most of the 19th century. The morning rush hour business services were among "the heaviest express services in the world" in the 1880s, with loads of 360 tons.

Individual Pullman cars were introduced to Britain on the Midland Railway in 1874, followed by the Great Northern Railway soon after and the LB&SCR in 1875. The LB&SCR pioneered all-Pullman trains in England, the Pullman Limited Express on 5 December 1881. It consisted of four cars built at the Pullman Car Company workshops in Derby, Beatrice, Louise, Maud and Victoria, the first electrically lit coaches on a British railway. The train made two down and two up trips per day, one each way on Sundays. It was renamed the Brighton Pullman Limited in 1887, and first-class carriages were attached. A new train was built in 1888: three Pullmans were shipped over in parts from the Pullman Palace Car Company in America, and assembled by the LB&SCR at Brighton.

The Brighton Limited was introduced on 2 October 1898. It ran only on Sundays, and not in July–September. It was timed to make the journey from Victoria in 60 minutes: "London to Brighton in one hour" was the advertisement used for the first time. On 21 December 1902 it made a record run of 54 minutes. It hit the headlines again when, faced with the threat of a competing electric railway being built from London to Brighton, it ran to Brighton in 48 minutes 41 seconds and the return to London in 50 minutes 21 seconds, matching the schedule put forward by the promoters of the electric line. The Southern Belle, introduced 8 November 1908, was described as "the most luxurious train in the World." By 1910 two trips each way were running every day; later three were run on Sundays. Third-class Pullman cars began running on Sunday 12 September 1915 from Victoria to Brighton and Eastbourne.

=== Stopping trains ===
Slower passenger services between London and the south coast often divided at East Croydon to serve both the London termini, and combined there for down trains, so East Croydon had an important nodal function in the system. After 1867, following the opening of the direct line to Horsham, Sutton acted as a similar node for passenger trains between London and Portsmouth.

=== Slip coaches ===
The LB&SCR appears to have invented the practice of slipping coaches from the rear of express trains at intermediate stations for onward transmission to branch lines or smaller stations on the main line. The earliest recorded example was at Haywards Heath in February 1858, where coaches for Hastings were slipped from a London–Brighton express. The slipping was coordinated by a series of communication bell signals between the guards on the two portions of the train and the locomotive crew.

Before 1914, twenty-one coaches were slipped each day on the Brighton main line. Coaches were slipped at Horley and Three Bridges for stations to East Grinstead, Forest Row and Horsham, or at Haywards Heath for stations to Brighton and Eastbourne. The practice continued until the electrification of the main line in 1932.

=== London suburban traffic ===
After 1870, the LB&SCR greatly encouraged commuters into London by reducing the prices of season tickets and introducing special workmen's trains for manual workers in that year. By May 1890 the company was operating 10,773 trains into its London termini each month, more than any other company. This growth changed the character of the railway and had a profound influence upon its motive power policy and passenger train services. In the 1870s and 1880s it led to the building of new standard tank engine classes such as the Terrier and D1 classes under William Stroudley. R. J. Billinton replaced these with the D3, E3, E4, and E5 classes designed for London suburban services, during the 1890s. When steam locomotives became unable to cope with the increased suburban traffic and competition from electric trams in the early 20th century, it resulted in the electrification of the London suburban network.

=== Excursion and holiday traffic ===
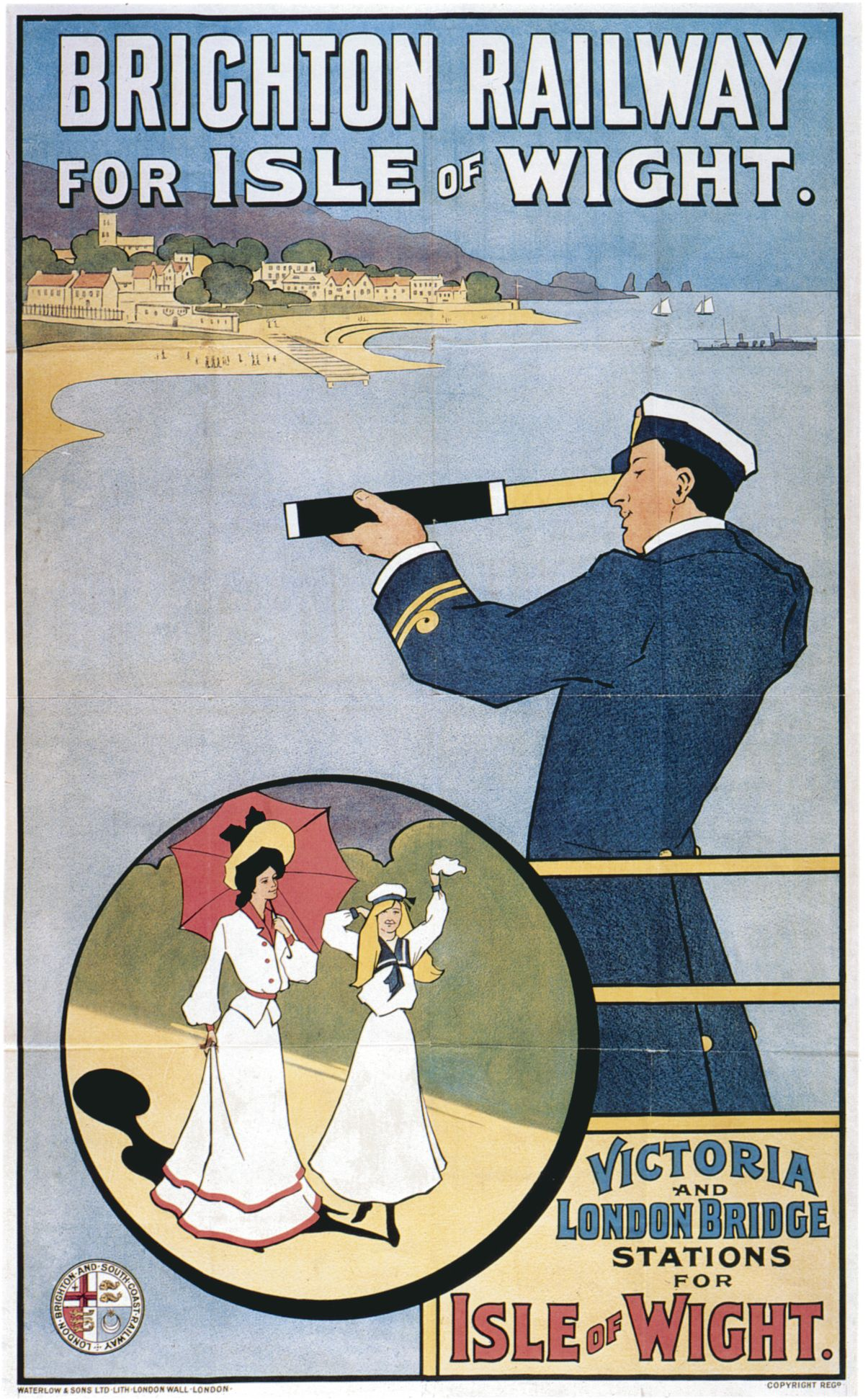
A LB&SCR poster advertising the Isle of Wight

Excursion trains from London to the South Coast and the Sussex countryside had been introduced in 1844, and were a feature of the LB&SCR throughout its existence. Special fares to Brighton and other south coast resorts on summer Sundays and at bank holidays were regularly advertised in the press. Likewise, special trains serving the regular fetes and exhibitions at Crystal Palace during the summer months.

After 1870 the LB&SCR sought to develop the holiday and excursion trade and market other south coast resorts such as Hayling Island and the Isle of Wight as holiday destinations, by publishing a range of attractive posters. On the Isle of Wight the LB&SCR and the L&SWR jointly took over the ferry service from Portsmouth and built new pier at Ryde with a short line to the station at St John's Road in 1880. During the 1900s the company ran special Sunday trains to enable London cyclists to explore the Sussex and Surrey countryside. By 1905 the railway was offering day trips to Dieppe and circular tickets, valid for a month, to enable Londoners to explore towns along the South Coast.

In 1904 the Great Western Railway inaugurated holiday trains during the summer months from Birkenhead to Brighton and Eastbourne, in conjunction with the LB&SCR. The following year LB&SCR and L&NWR jointly operated the Sunny South Special from Liverpool and Manchester to these destinations. These trains operated via the West London lines, with the LB&SCR responsible for their operation from Kensington or Willesden.

The LB&SCR served important Horse racing tracks at Brighton, Epsom, Gatwick, Goodwood, Lewes, Lingfield and Plumpton, and Portsmouth Park (Farlington). Race day special trains were an important source of revenue during the summer months.

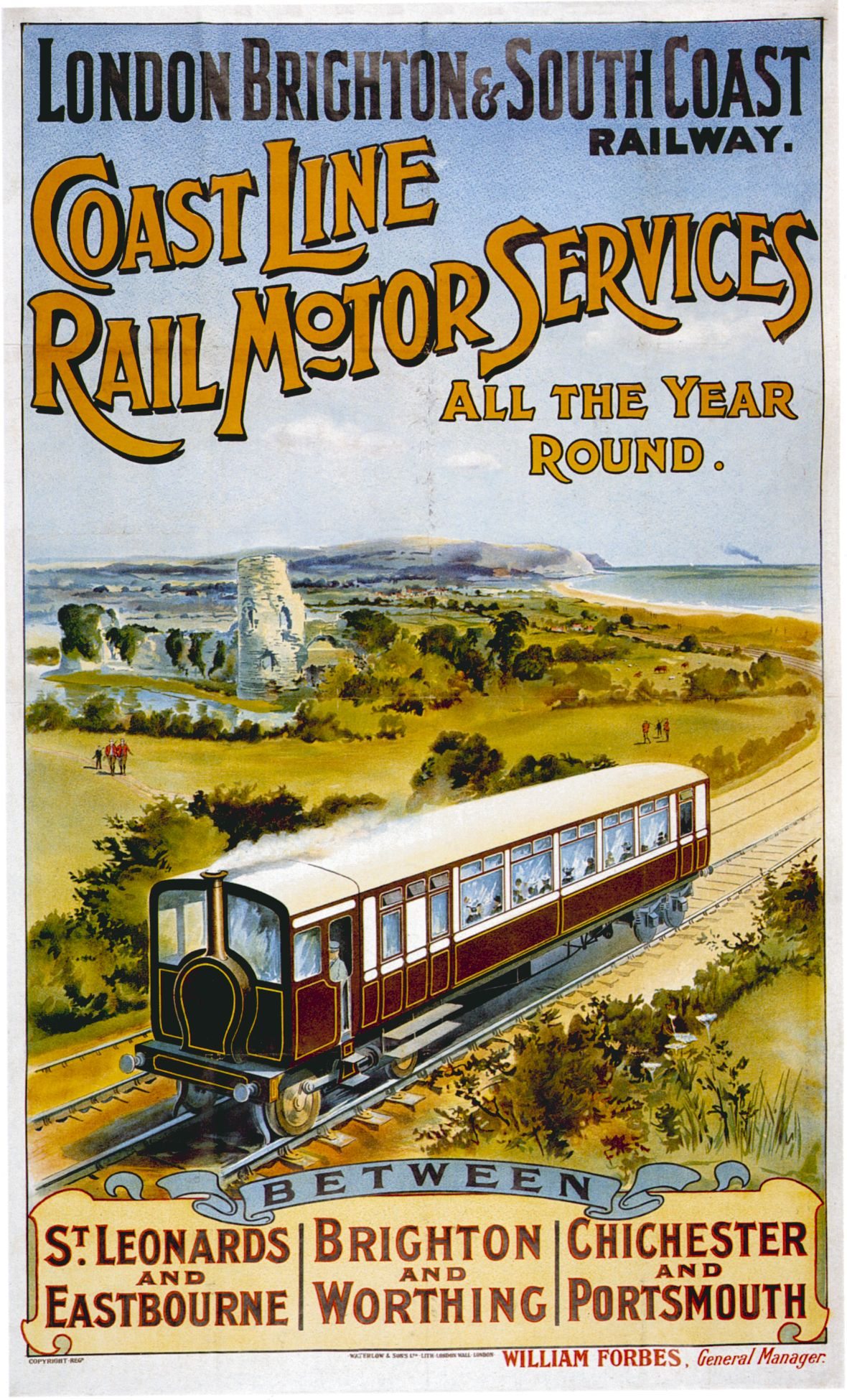
1906 poster advertising rail motor services

=== Rail motor services ===
During the first few years of the 20th century the LB&SCR, in common with other railways, became concerned about losses on branch and short-distance passenger services, particularly in winter. The L&SWR and the LB&SCR boards decided to investigate the use of steam powered railcars on the 1 1/4-mile (2 km) joint branch line between Fratton and East Southsea, in June 1903. The locomotive and carriage units were both built by the L&SWR, but one of the carriages was painted in the LB&SCR livery. The two vehicles had to be quickly withdrawn as they were found to be chronically underpowered, but were rebuilt with larger boilers and thereafter gave adequate service. However, their use did not stem the loss of traffic to the roads and in 1914 the branch was closed.

Nevertheless, the LB&SCR directors asked the Chief Mechanical Engineer, Robert Billinton, to investigate the use of steam or petrol railcars on lightly used services. Billinton died in 1904, before examples could be acquired, but in 1905 his successor Douglas Earle Marsh acquired two steam railcars from Beyer, Peacock and Company and two petrol railcars from Dick, Kerr & Co. These were compared with small steam locomotives of the Stroudley A1 and D1 classes fitted for "motor train" or "push-pull" working. Neither type of railcar was successful, being inadequate to cope with traffic fluctuations between winter and summer, but the "motor trains" could be adapted by the addition or removal of extra coaches. As a result, the experiment provided a new lease of life for the Stroudley tank classes, which continued to be used on branch lines for many years after their withdrawal from suburban services. The steam railcars were sold in 1919, and the petrol railcars were used for departmental (non-revenue-earning) purposes during the erection of the catenary for the overhead electrification of the London suburban lines.

During the experiments relating to railcars and motor trains, the LB&SCR constructed unmanned halts, such as Lyons Crossing Halt and Littlehaven Halt on the Arun Valley Line, in an attempt to increase passenger revenue.

=== Freight services ===
Freight represented a relatively small part of the LB&SCR's finances during its first half century. Agricultural goods and general merchandise were carried, together with wine, foodstuffs and manufactured goods imported from France. During the 1870s the pattern of goods services slowly began to change, leading to rapid growth in the 1890s, 'caused by the transport of raw materials and finished products of entirely new industries such as petroleum, cement, brick and tile manufacture, forestry and biscuit making.' This resulted in the construction of 55 goods locomotives of the C2 class

There were no coal mines within LB&SCR territory, and so it had to pay substantially more for its fuel than most other companies. The bulk of its coal was brought in 800 long tons (810 t) trains from Acton yard on the Great Western Railway to Three Bridges for redistribution, and the LB&SCR kept two goods locomotives at the GWR Westbourne Park Depot for this purpose. In 1898 there was a scheme to develop Deptford Wharf for the landing of coal by sea. The additional fuel costs were partially offset by the sale of shingle for rail ballast from Pevensey.

The main London goods depot was at 'Willow Walk', part of the Bricklayers Arms complex, where the LB&SCR established its facilities in 1849. These were enlarged in 1854 after it entered into an agreement with the LC&DR to handle its goods traffic. Further extensions were built in 1865 and 1902. There were also freight handling facilities at Battersea and Deptford Wharves, and New Cross in London and the railway constructed a marshalling yard to the south of Norwood Junction during the 1870s, extended in the early 1880s. Other freight handling facilities outside London were at: Brighton (where there was a separate goods station at, adjacent to the passenger station), Eastbourne, Hastings, Littlehampton, Portsmouth, Newhaven, Seaford, and Three Bridges.

== Electrification ==
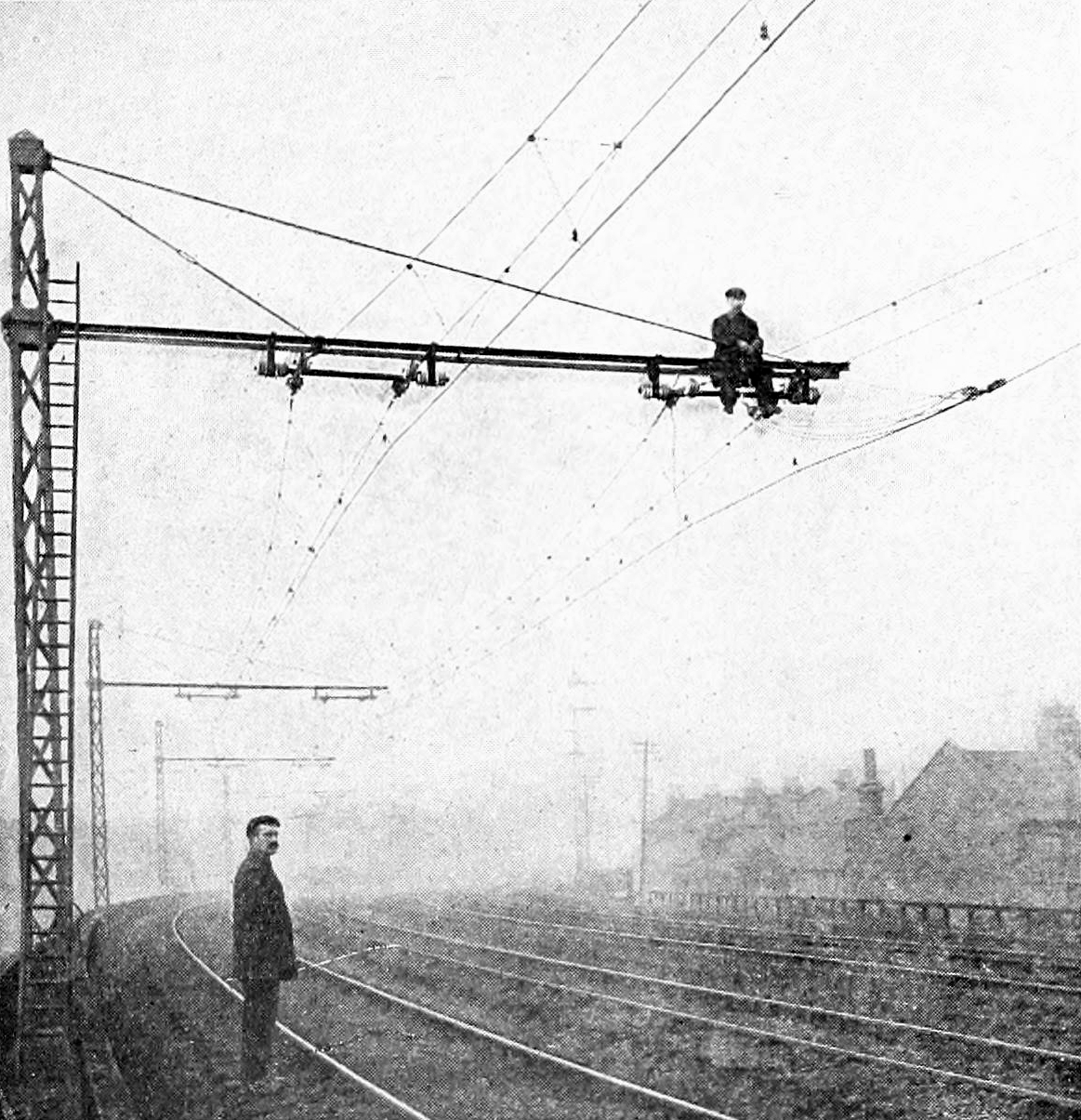
Construction of overhead electrical lines, c. 1908

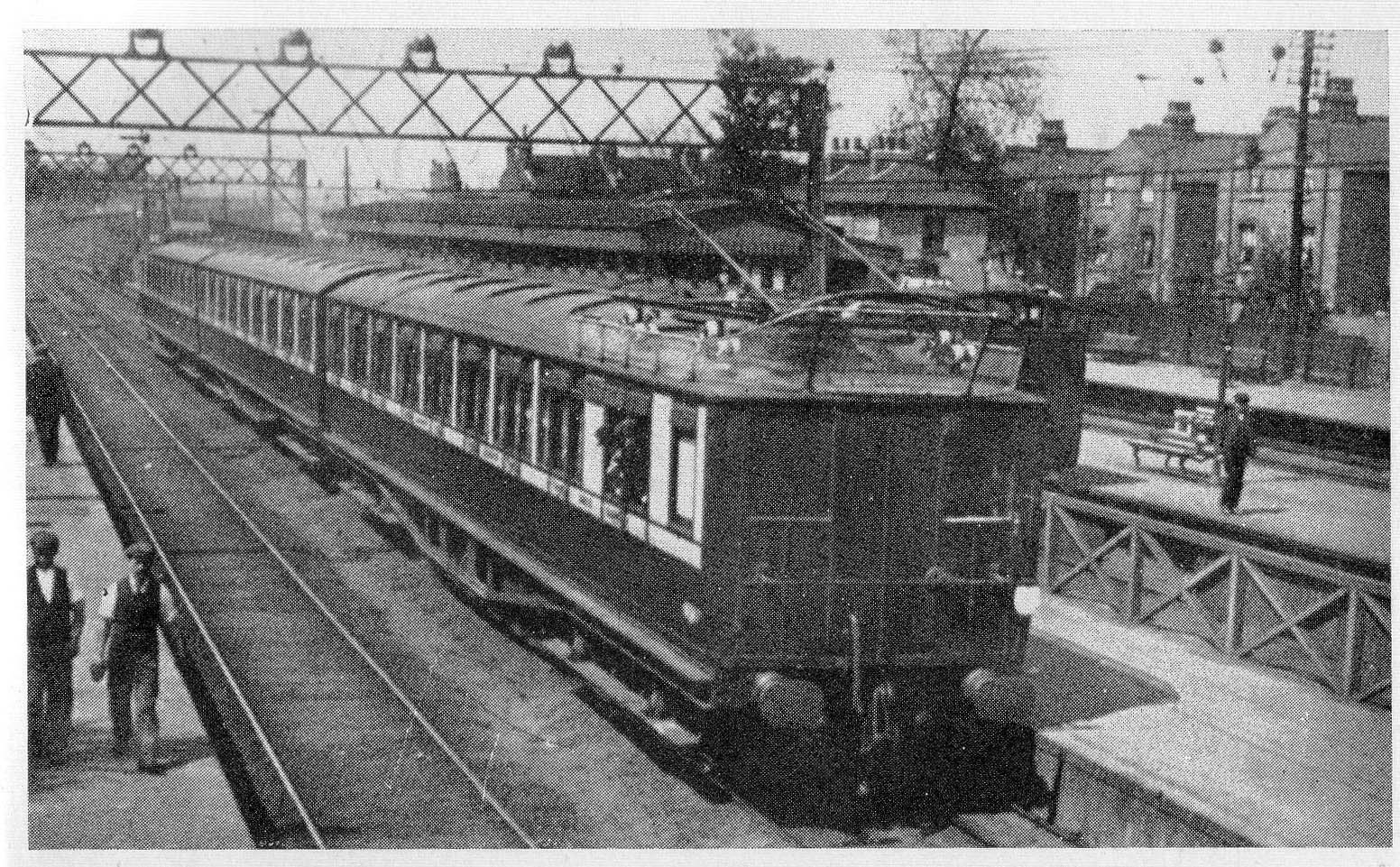
An SL Class train on the South London line at Wandsworth Road station, about 1909

Proposals for a London and Brighton Electric Railway made to Parliament in 1900 failed to proceed, but caused the LB&SCR to consider electrification. Also, competition from the introduction of trams in London meant that annual traffic over the circuitous 8 1/2-mile (14 km) route between Victoria and London Bridge stations had dropped from 8 million to 3 million journeys by 1908. Because of the nature of its traffic with a very large number of commuter journeys over relatively short distances, the railway was an obvious candidate for electrification, and had sought powers for suburban lines in 1903. Third and fourth rail direct current electrification had been chosen for the underground tube railways and the Metropolitan Railway and District Railway in London, the Mersey Railway in Liverpool and the Lancashire and Yorkshire Railway Liverpool to Southport line. However the LB&SCR foresaw electrification of its main line, and ultimately to Portsmouth and Hastings, and therefore decided on a high-tension overhead supply system at 6,600 V 25 Hz AC .

Although the Midland Railway line from Lancaster to Morecambe and Heysham had been the first to use overhead lines, the LB&SCR lines covered a far greater length of track. This system was of German origin and the contractor for the electrical equipment was Allgemeine Elektricitäts Gesellschaft of Berlin, while the main contractor was Robert W Blackwell & Co Ltd. Power supply was from the London Electric Supply Corporation (LESCo) at Deptford.

The first section was the South London line connecting London Bridge with Victoria via Denmark Hill, opened on 1 December 1909. It was marketed as 'The Elevated Electric' and was an immediate success. Traffic on the line grew from 3 to 10 million journeys per year. Other routes followed: on 12 May 1911 Victoria–Crystal Palace via Balham and West Norwood, followed on 3 March 1912 by the line from Peckham Rye to West Norwood. Repair shops were established at Peckham Rye, and carriage sheds at Norwood Junction.

At opening the rolling stock consisted of 16 motor coaches these were supplemented by an additional of 30 motor coaches in 1911.

Continued success and profitability of its earliest projects caused the LB&SCR to decide to electrify all remaining London suburban lines in 1913. However, the outbreak of war the following year delayed what was planned to have been considerable further mileage of electrified line. By 1921 most of the inner London suburban lines were electrified, and during 1922 lines to Coulsdon North and Sutton, opened on 1 April 1925. During 1920, plans were drawn up to extend the 'Elevated Electric' to Brighton, Worthing, Eastbourne, Newhaven and Seaford, and to Epsom and Oxted, but these were overtaken by the Grouping.

The 'Elevated Electric' proved to be a technical and financial success, but was short-lived since the L&SWR had adopted the third-rail system: its mileage far exceeded that of the LB&SCR. In 1926 the Southern Railway announced that, as part of a huge electrification project, all overhead lines were to be converted to third rail, thus bringing all lines into a common system. The last overhead electric train ran on 22 September 1929.

== Accidents and signalling control ==
Semaphore signalling and signal boxes were first introduced on the L&CR and had been adopted by the L&BR as early as the 1840s. There were a number of serious accidents in the early years of the LB&SCR, some due to failures in communication. The LB&SCR began to improve its safety record in the 1860s with the introduction of interlocking, and the early introduction of Westinghouse air brakes. Given the large number of junctions and the intensive use of its system, the LB&SCR maintained a good safety record during the last half century of its existence.

The following accidents occurred on the LB&SCR:

- On 6 June 1851, there was a derailment at Falmer Bank, East Sussex due to an object on the line.
- On 27 November 1851, passenger train from Brighton ran into the eighth wagon of a goods train that had just left Ford, station, West Sussex, due to the passenger train passing a signal at danger.
- On 17 March 1853, the boiler of locomotive No. 10 exploded at Brighton, East Sussex.
- On 27 August 1853, confusion over a warning signal at New Cross caused a goods train to collide with an empty passenger train, resulting in the death of a fireman
- On 21 August 1854, there was an accident at East Croydon, Surrey due to numerous causes, resulting in three fatalities and eleven injured.
- On 3 October 1859, the boiler of a locomotive exploded at Falmer Incline.
- On 25 August 1861, in the accident known as the Clayton Tunnel rail crash, an excursion train ran into the rear of another inside Clayton Tunnel, West Sussex due to a combination of the failure of an automatic signal to return to 'danger' and culpable operating errors. At the time, this was the deadliest accident up to that time in the United Kingdom with 23 people killed and 176 people injured.
- On 29 May 1863, there was a derailment at Streatham Common, Surrey. Four people (including the driver) were killed 59 people were injured.
- On 23 June 1869, two trains collided at New Cross Gate, Surrey due to driver error, excessive speed and guard error, injuring 91 people.
- On 27 September 1879, the boiler of a locomotive exploded at Lewes, East Sussex. One person was killed and two were injured.
- On 1 May 1891, in the accident known as the Norwood Junction rail accident, a cast-iron bridge collapsed under a train at Norwood Junction, Surrey. Six people were injured.
- On 23 July 1894, a brake van next to the engine hauling the 6.35pm from Havant derailed at Farlington Halt railway station and the first two coaches overturned. The guard on the train was killed and seven passengers were injured.
- On 1 September 1897, a passenger train derailed near Heathfield, East Sussex. One person was killed.
- On 23 December 1899, a Brighton train passed a signal at danger and ran into the back of a boat train express in thick fog at Keymer Junction, West Sussex. There were six fatalities and 20 injured.
- In 1904, a freight train hauled by D1 class No. 239 Patcham was derailed at Cocking, West Sussex.
- On 29 January 1910, an express passenger train became divided and was derailed at Stoat's Nest, Surrey due to a defective wheelset on a carriage. Seven people were killed and 65 were injured.
- On 21 October 1913, seven labourers were working a night shift at London Bridge station, scraping and cleaning the cradles and insulator fittings of the overhead line equipment. The wire brush of one of the men, labourer Amos Boniface, touched one of the electrical wires and he suffered severe burns. Boniface died 19 days later from his injuries.
- On 3 April 1916, a passenger train was derailed between Crowborough & Jarvis Brook and Buxted stations, East Sussex.
- On 18 April 1918, a freight train became divided, the rear part coming to rest inside Redhill Tunnel, Surrey. Due to a signalman's error, another freight train ran into the wagons and was derailed. A third freight train ran into the wreckage.

=== Signalling and signal boxes ===
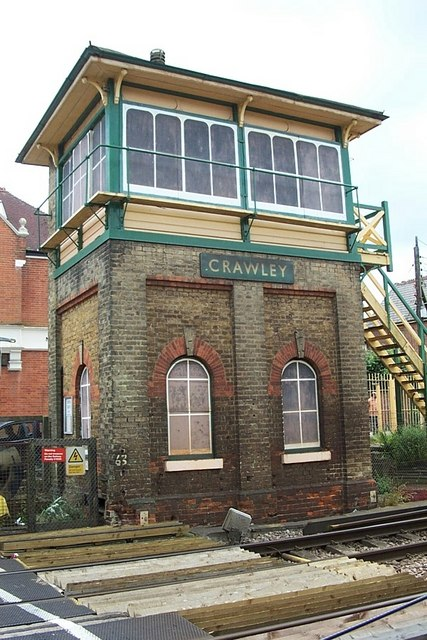
The signal box at Crawley built by Saxby and Farmer in 1877

The LB&SCR originally used semaphore for home signals and 'double disc' for distant signals, but after 1872 semaphore signals were used for both purposes.

The LB&SCR was using primitive interlocking between signals at some junctions by 1844. In 1856, John Saxby, an LB&SCR carpenter, patented a form of manual interlocking of the points and signals, first tried at Bricklayers Arms that year. The first fully interlocking frame was installed by Saxby at Keymer Junction near Haywards Heath in 1860, where he built a small workshop to undertake private work. He left the company and in 1862 formed Saxby & Farmer signalling contractors. Thereafter the LB&SC patronised Saxby & Farmer for most of its signalling until circa 1880. Thereafter it adopted the Sykes 'Lock and block' system used on the LC&DR.

The LB&SCR inherited the world's first signal boxes, at Bricklayers Arms Junction and Brighton Junction (Norwood). After 1880 it gradually developed its own architecture for signal boxes, using home-produced and contractor-built frames. J. E. Annett, the inventor of Annett's key in 1875, a portable form of interlocking, was a former LB&SCR employee.

During the remodelling of London Victoria station between 1898 and 1908 it was resignalled using the Sykes electromechanical method for controlling points and signals, allowing for more compact signal boxes.

== Rolling stock ==
For the greater part of its existence the LB&SCR relied upon steam locomotives for motive power, and it owned no diesel or electric locomotives. The electrified lines were worked by electric multiple units for passenger traffic and by steam for freight. It experimented with two petrol railcars in 1906 and 1907, but these proved to be underpowered and highly unreliable and were soon taken out of traffic.

The LB&SCR under Stroudley was one of the first railways in Britain to adopt the Westinghouse air brake after 1877 in preference to the far less effective vacuum brakes employed by its neighbours.

=== Steam locomotives ===
The LB&SCR inherited 51 steam locomotives from the Brighton, Croydon and Dover Joint Committee, and it built or purchased 1,055 locomotives. Of these, 620 were handed over to the Southern Railway on 1 January 1923.

The LB&SCR achieved early fame as the first railway to use the Jenny Lind 2-2-2 locomotive in 1847, designed by David Joy, the Chief Draughtsman of the E. B. Wilson and Company of Leeds, later widely used by other railways. The policy of John Chester Craven, Locomotive Superintendent from 1847 to 1869, was to design locomotives for each task or type of traffic. Many of his designs were capable locomotives, but with 72 different classes in use at the time of William Stroudley's appointment in 1870, the policy was hopelessly uneconomic.

Stroudley reduced this to 12 main classes, many with interchangeable parts, by 1888. He introduced a number of extremely successful and long-lived designs, notably the A1 ('Terrier') and E1 classes 0-6-0T, and the D1 class 0-4-2T, the powerful G class 2-2-2 'singles' and the B1 'Gladstone' class 0-4-2 express passenger locomotives. Less successful were his C and C1 0-6-0 classes of 1871 and 1882 respectively, both of which proved to be underpowered as the volume of freight traffic grew towards the end of the century. Stroudley's locomotives were all limited to six wheels, and he never used bogies largely because of the limitations imposed by turntables, notably at Victoria. The high price of coal encouraged him to experiment with condensing apparatus.

Stroudley's successor R. J. Billinton continued the process of standardisation of locomotive parts until his death in 1904, thereby reducing maintenance costs. He introduced eight-wheeled designs in the form of 4-4-0 express locomotives of the B4 class and the D3 class 0-4-4T, for use on London suburban services. He also introduced a very successful and versatile series of four 0-6-2T tank engine classes with radial axles for both passenger and freight duties. Of less success was his 0-6-0 freight locomotives of the C2 class.

D.E. Marsh continued the process of building larger locomotives with the H1 class of 4-4-2 express passenger locomotives of 1905, based on a former Great Northern railway design. A superheated version was introduced in 1911. Marsh was also responsible for the design of four of 4-4-2T classes (I1-I4) but of these, only the I3 class were successful, being described by Klaus Marx as 'wonder engines'. This class was also instrumental in demonstrating the benefits of superheating to locomotive engineers in Britain. Marsh also designed a class of 4-6-2 tank engines, and a very poor C3 class of 0-6-0, freight locomotives, which proved to perform worse than the locomotives they were due to replace. However, he found that by rebuilding Billinton's unsuccessful C2 class with his newly designed C3 boiler he was at last able to produce a successful freight design for the railway in the form of the C2X class.

The last Chief Mechanical Engineer was L.B. Billinton, who designed the powerful K class 2-6-0 mixed-traffic locomotives and the LB&SCR E2 class in 1913, and the L class 4-6-4 tanks of 1914. All of these designs were successful but his career was cut short by the First World War and the grouping of British railways. According to D.L. Bradley, the railway handed over "a nicely balanced stock of locomotives well-suited to the demands of the Brighton section" to the Southern Railway at grouping in 1923.

LB&SCR locomotive designs had little impact on the locomotive policy of the Southern Railway after 1923 because they were built to a more generous loading gauge and had Westinghouse air brakes unlike the two other main constituent companies. Although the designs were not perpetuated, the originals proved to be particularly long-lived. 62.8% of locomotives inherited by the Southern Railway were still in use at the nationalisation of British Railways in 1948, compared with 57.9% for the L&SWR and 56.8% for the SE&CR.

=== Electric traction ===
The electrified lines were operated by electric multiple units. These were originally three-car units, with a trailer sandwiched between motor cars, later converted into two-car units with one driving motor car and one driving trailer. New classes of multiple unit were developed for each electrified line, known as the South London stock and the Crystal Palace stock. A third type, the Coulsdon and Wallington stock was planned by the LB&SCR but introduced by the Southern Railway.

=== Coaching stock ===
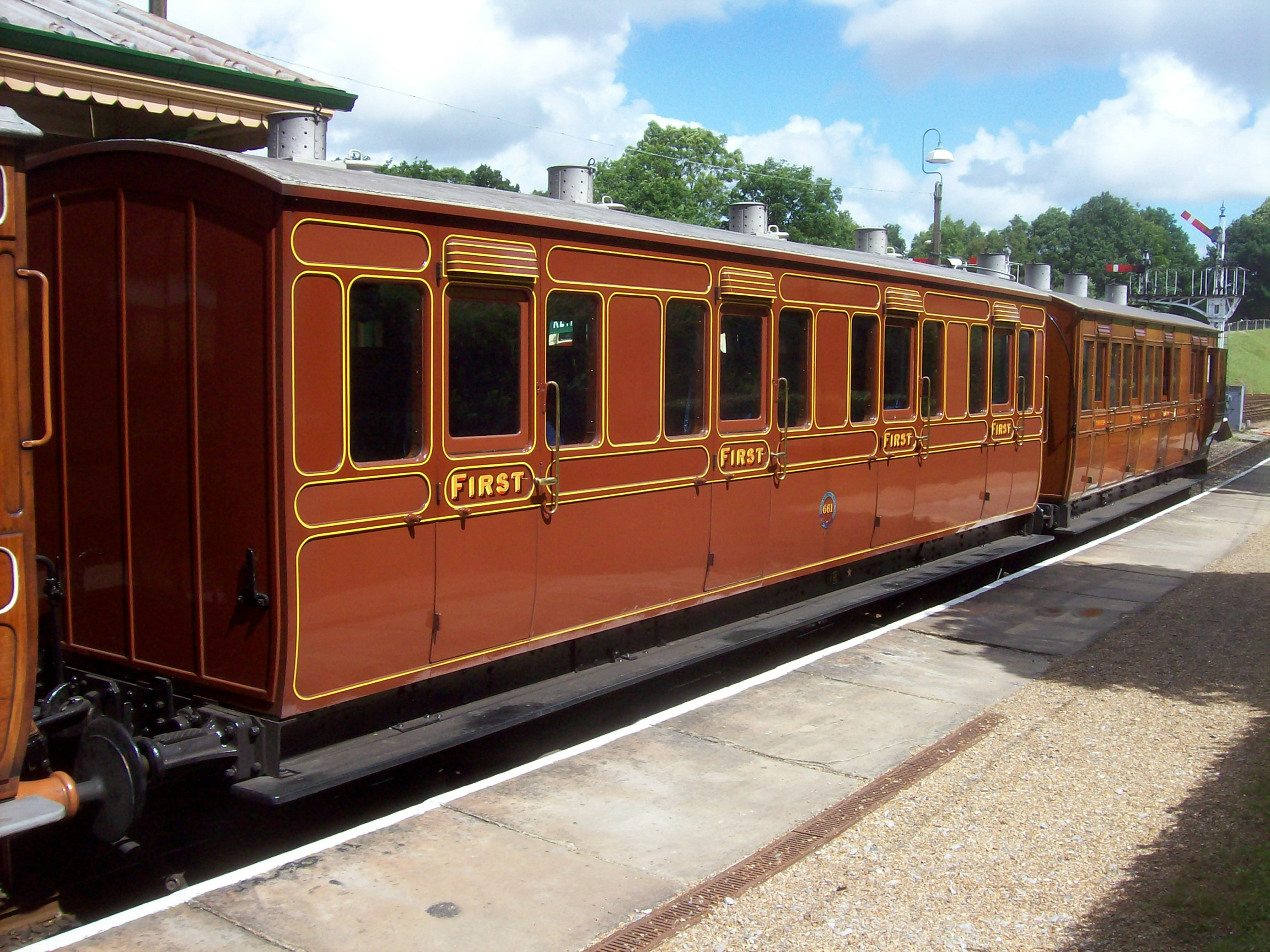
LB&SCR coach no. 661 at Horsted Keynes, Bluebell Railway

The jobs of Locomotive Superintendent and Carriage and wagon superintendent were combined until the retirement of D. E. Marsh in 1911. As a result, the LB&SCR was never at the forefront of carriage development for its ordinary coaching stock, and as late as the mid-1860s was still building open-side 3rd class carriages. Stroudley introduced four-wheeled and later six-wheeled designs which lasted for 40 years, and shortly before his death in 1889 he introduced a few bogie carriages for the main business trains. Stroudley was a pioneer of dynamo-driven electric lighting and communication cords. The LB&SCR introduced breakfast cars to its main business trains.

The appointment of Albert Panter as Carriage and Wagon Works Manager under Robert Billinton in 1898 (Carriage and Wagon Superintendent from 1912) led to the introduction of bogie carriages for mainline trains in 1905, but suburban services were operated by six-wheeled "block trains" with solid wooden buffers, permanently tight coupled in sets of ten or 12. Many of these were still in use at grouping in 1923. Better vehicles appeared early in the 20th century with the 'Balloon stock' and electric stock.

Sixteen carriages of LB&SCR origin have been preserved, including one luxurious "Directors' saloon" of 1914: these are principally on the Bluebell Railway and the Isle of Wight Steam Railway. A number of grounded carriage bodies used as holiday homes survive.

=== Wagons ===
Sixteen wagons formerly in LB&SCR ownership now survive, largely because the Southern Railway transferred them to the Isle of Wight, where they remained in use until the 1960s.

=== Liveries ===
After 1870 the LB&SCR was renowned for the attractiveness of its locomotives and coaching stock and condition of its country stations. "No company, even the North-Western itself turns out smarter looking trains than the Brighton main line expresses and even some of the suburban trains."

Between 1846 and 1870 passenger locomotives were painted hunter green with some having black lining. Frames were red, and wheels were black; buffer beams were the regulation 'signal red'. Goods locomotives were black with red and white lining, except those operating into Brighton or London Bridge, in passenger livery. Some engines had boilers lagged with wooden strips. These were either highly polished mahogany with brass fixings or were painted in alternating stripes of dark green and vermilion. The main shade of green used gradually became darker. By the time Stroudley became Locomotive Superintendent the colour had become a variant of Brunswick Green used by many other companies. Carriages were painted sea green or varnished wood, the latter mainly first class stock.

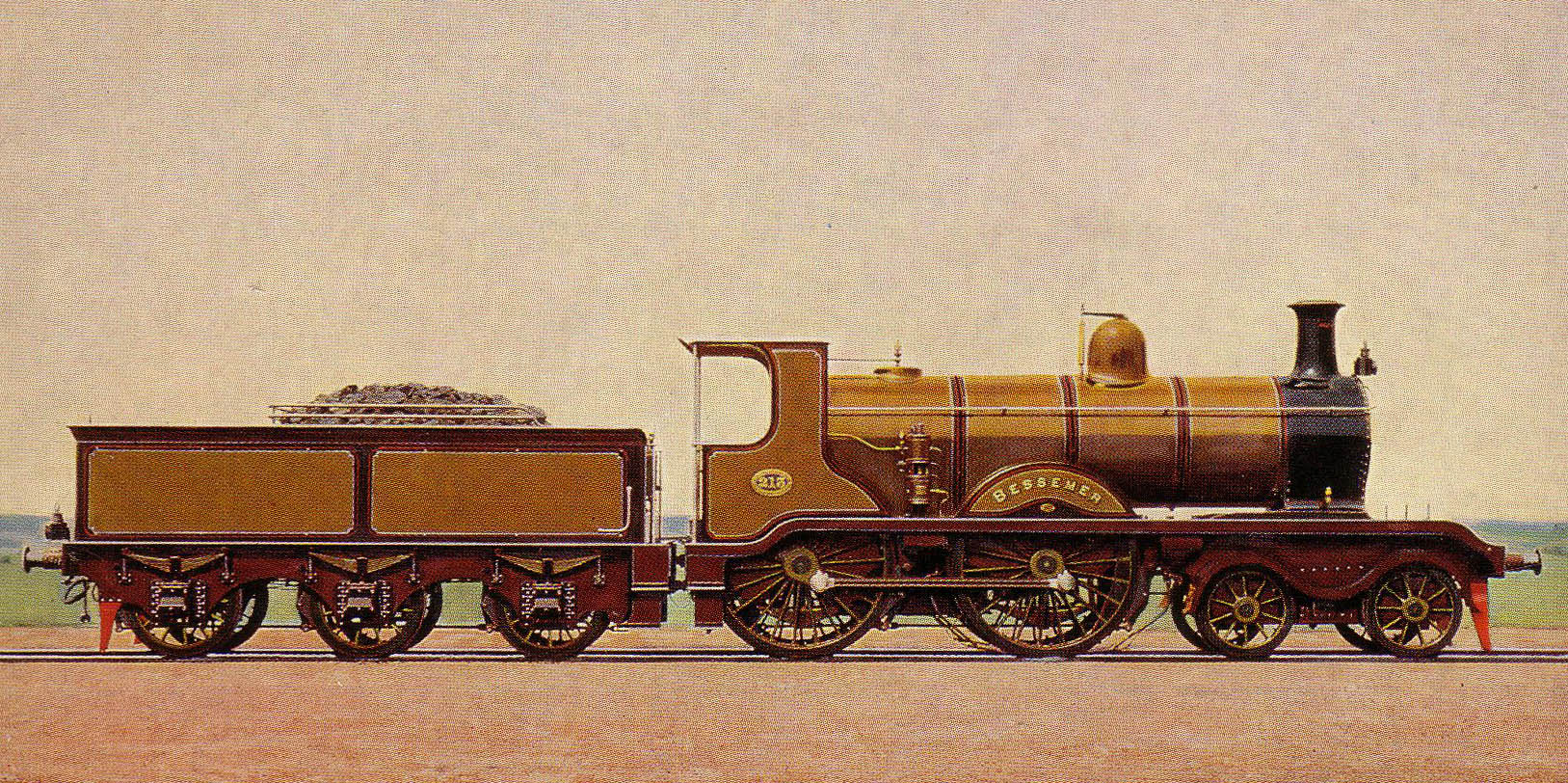
B2 Class 213 Bessemer 1897, in Stroudley's "Improved Engine Green"

From 1870 to 1905 the livery was Stroudley's famous Improved Engine Green, a golden ochre very similar to that used by his former employer, the Highland Railway. On passenger locomotives Improved Engine Green was finished with olive green borders lined with black, red and white. Frames and buffer beams were carmine red, lined with yellow and black. The wheels were Improved Engine Green with red lining. Cab roofs were white. Goods engines were all-over olive green with black borders, similar to the pre-1870 colours. If fitted with Westinghouse brakes the black borders were edged with red lines. Locomotives with names had the name applied in gold leaf to the tank side on tank locomotives, to a wheel splasher on tender locomotives. The letters were edged with a thin red line and given depth with black shading. This livery was one of the most ornate and distinctive used on British locomotives, and is remembered with nostalgia. Carriages were all mahogany in colour, with white roofs and black chassis gear. Initially the wood of the body was varnished, but as it became harder to maintain a high-quality varnish finish and it was painted in a similar-coloured paint. Panel lining and other details were picked out with gold leaf.

From 1905 to 1923 front-line express locomotives were a dark shade of umber. Lining was black with a gilt line either side. Cab roofs remained white. Frames were black, wheels umber, and buffer beams returned to signal red. The company's initials were painted on the tender- or tank-sides (initially 'L.B.& S.C.R.', but after 1911 the ampersand and the R were removed) in gilt. Secondary passenger locomotives had the same livery, but instead of gilt lining chrome yellow paint was used. Goods engines were gloss black with double vermilion lining. Names and numbers were in white letters with red shading. Carriages were initially all olive green with white lining and detailing. From 1911 this changed to plain umber with black lettering picked out with gold shading.

== Ferry services and ships ==
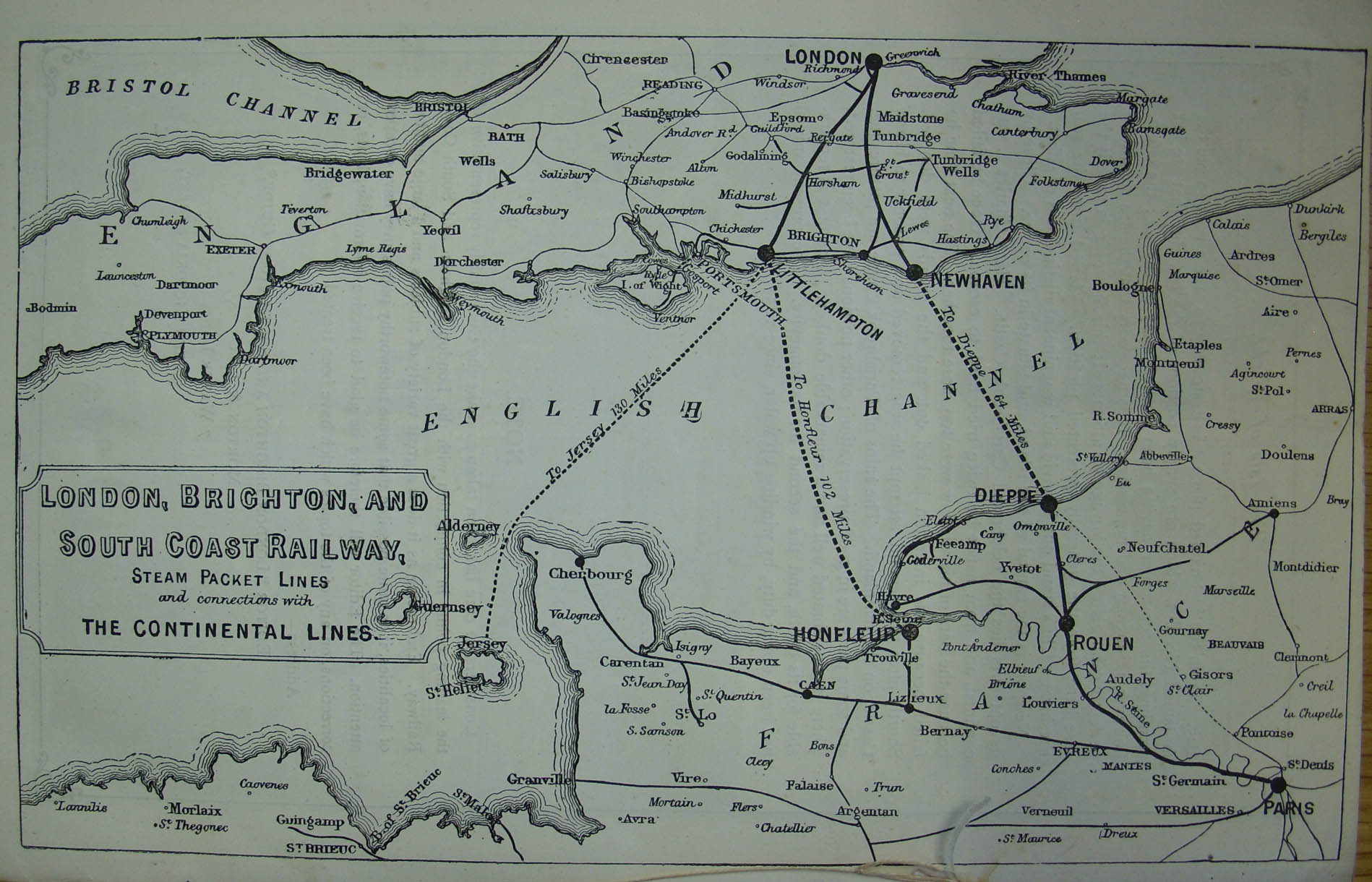
A map showing the main LB&SCR ferry routes in 1888

The LB&SCR invested in cross-channel ferry services, initially from Shoreham to Dieppe. Following the opening of the line to Newhaven in 1847, it improved Newhaven harbour, building a wharf and dredging the channel. A Newhaven–Dieppe service was established in 1847, but discontinued soon afterwards. In 1850 it established a Newhaven–Jersey ferry service, and in 1853 it reinstated the Dieppe service.

London, Brighton and South Coast Railway (New Lines) Act 1862
- Act of Parliament
- Parliament of the United Kingdom
- Long title: An Act to authorize the London, Brighton, and South Coast Railway Company to make certain new Lines of Railway in the Counties of Surrey and Sussex; and for other Purposes.
- Citation: 25 & 26 Vict. c. lxviii

Dates
- Royal assent: 30 June 1862

Text of statute as originally enacted

The London, Brighton and South Coast Railway (New Lines) Act 1862 (25 & 26 Vict. c. lxviii) gave the LB&SCR power to own and operate its own steam vessels, so it instructed Chief Engineer Frederick Banister to greatly expand the port and its facilities. In 1863 the Chemins de Fer de l'Ouest in France agreed to operate the Newhaven–Dieppe passenger service jointly, advertised as the "shortest and cheapest" route to Paris, but never the quickest because of the much longer time taken at sea than the rival Dover to Calais route. (Newhaven harbour was taken over by the military authorities and the ferries requisitioned for the duration of the First World War.)

In 1863, the LB&SCR transferred the Jersey service to Littlehampton and soon afterwards established another between Littlehampton and Honfleur.

By 1880 lines connected the Ryde Pier and the Portsmouth Harbour ferry terminals. It was therefore a natural progression for the companies to acquire the ferry routes. To do this the LB&SCR and the L&SWR formed the South Western and Brighton Railway Companies Steam Packet Service (SW&BRCSPS), which bought the operators.

In 1884 the Isle of Wight Marine Transit Company started a goods rail ferry between the Hayling Island Branch Line at Langstone and the Bembridge branch line at St Helens quay. The rail ferry PS Carrier, designed to carry railway trucks, was moved from Scotland. The project was unsuccessful and, despite being acquired by the LB&SCR in 1886, ended in 1888.

The LB&SCR operated a significant number of ships in its own right, jointly with Chemins de Fer de l'Ouest, and as a part of the SW&BRCSPS.

== Structures, buildings and civil engineering ==
The LB&SCR inherited significant structures, buildings and other civil engineering features, including:

- Bridges and viaducts – the Ouse Valley Viaduct, London Road viaduct, the Lewes Road viaduct Moulsecoomb.
- The Norwood Junction flyover, the world's first railway overpass.
- Tunnels – Merstham, Balcombe, Haywards Heath, Clayton and Patcham, Ditchling Road (Brighton) and Falmer
- Stations – Modular station buildings at Brighton, Croydon, Redhill and Reigate Road, Horley, Three Bridges and Hassocks, designed by David Mocatta.

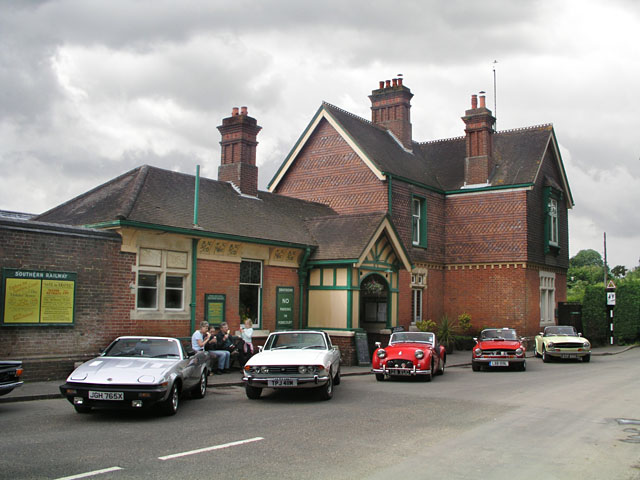
The entrance to Horsted Keynes railway station typical of several late Victorian LB&SCR country stations in Sussex

=== Stations ===
The LB&SCR inherited or built 20 termini, the most significant at London Bridge, London Victoria, Brighton, Portsmouth Harbour and Eastbourne. Stations at major junctions included Clapham Junction, East Croydon, Three Bridges, Horsham, and Lewes.

The use of Mocatta's modular station designs was not perpetuated. During the 1850s and 1860s most stations were constructed according to one or two stock designs prepared by the Chief Engineers, Robert Jacomb-Hood (1822–1900) and Frederick Banister (1860–1895). Banister had a love of Italianate architecture, meaning that during the 1880s the LB&SCR produced elaborate decorated architecture for many country stations, notably on the Bluebell and Cuckoo Lines. The architect was Banister's son-in-law, Thomas Myres.

=== Workshops and motive power depots ===
The L&BR established a repair workshop at Brighton in 1840. Between 1852 and 1957 more than 1,200 steam locomotives and prototype diesel-electric and electric locomotives were constructed there, before closure in 1962. It had small locomotive repair facilities at New Cross and Battersea Park Depots in London.

By the first decade of the 20th century, Brighton works could no longer cope with the repair and building of both locomotives and rolling stock. In 1911 the LB&SCR built a carriage and wagon works at Lancing, which operated until 1965. A marine engineering workshop was established in the mid-1870s at Newhaven.

There were engine sheds at Battersea Park, Brighton, Bognor Regis, Coulsdon North, West Croydon, Eastbourne, Epsom, Fratton (joint) Horsham, Littlehampton, Midhurst, New Cross Gate, Newhaven Town, St Leonards West Marina, Three Bridges and Tunbridge Wells West.

The headquarters and main offices were at Brighton station from 1846 until 1892, when they were transferred to the former Terminus Hotel at London Bridge.

=== Hotels ===
The LB&SCR opened the Terminus Hotel at London Bridge and the Grosvenor Hotel at London Victoria in 1861. The first of these was not successful due to its site on the south bank and was turned into offices for the railway in 1892. It was destroyed by bombing in 1941. The Grosvenor Hotel was rebuilt and enlarged in 1901. The LB&SCR acquired the Terminus Hotel next to Brighton station in 1877, and operated the London and Paris Hotel at Newhaven.

== The LB&SCR as an investment ==
The 1867 report by the railway found that there had been 'a reckless disregard for shareholders' interests for many years.'. As a result, the company policies were several times subjected to criticism in pamphlets published during the 1870s and 1880s. The matter was settled in 1890 when the economist and editor of the Financial Times, William Ramage Lawson, conducted a detailed analysis of the financial performance and prospects of the LB&SCR, comparing it with other British railways. He concluded that the Brighton Deferred stock 'combined the highest return on investment, with the best prospect of future appreciation and the smallest risk of retrogression.' Among the reasons given for this opinion were:

- Well established route and freedom from competition
- Varied and well distributed sources of traffic
- Moderate working expenses due to high quality construction of the original route and good maintenance.
- Energetic and prudent management

From 1870 the LB&SCR appears to have been a well-run, profitable railway for its shareholders.

== Notable people ==
=== Chairmen of the board of directors ===
- Charles Pasco Grenfell (1846–1848)
- Samuel Laing (1848–1855)
- Leo Schuster (1856–1866)
- Peter Northall Lawrie (1866–1867)
- Sir Walter Barttelot (April – July 1867)
- Samuel Laing (again, 1867–1896)
- Lord Cottesloe (1896–1908)
- Earl of Bessborough (1908–1920) – died in office
- Charles C. Macrae (1920–1922)
- Gerald Loder (December 1922)

=== Members of the board of directors ===
- John Pares Bickersteth
- Rear-Admiral The Hon. Thomas S. Brand
- Major Philip Cardew
- Dudley Docker
- Sir Julian Goldsmid
- William Milburn
- Lord Henry Nevill
- John Nix
- Sir Arthur Otway, 3rd Baronet – Deputy-Chairman in 1905
- Sir Spencer Walpole

=== Managers ===
- Peter Clarke(1846–1848) – Manager
- George Hawkins (1849–1850) – Goods Manager
- ? Pountain (1849–1850) – Non Goods Manager
- George Hawkins (1849–1850) – Traffic Manager
- John Peake Knight (1869–1870) – Traffic Manager
- John Peake Knight (1870–1886) general manager
- Sir Allen Sarle (1886–1897) general manager
- John Francis Sykes Gooday (1897–1899) general manager
- William de Guise Forbes (1899–1922) general manager

=== Secretaries ===
- T.J. Buckton (1846–1849)
- Frederick Slight (1849–1867)
- Sir Allen Sarle (1867–1898) from 1886 to 1898 also general manager
- J.J. Brewer (1898–1922)

=== Chief engineers ===
- Robert Jacomb-Hood (1846–1860)
- Frederick Banister (1860–1895)
- Charles Langbridge Morgan (1895–1917)
- J.B. Ball (1917–1920)
- O.G.C. Drury (1920–1922)

=== Locomotive superintendents ===
- John Gray (1846–1847)
- Thomas Kirtley (February–November 1847) – died in office
- John Chester Craven (1847–1870)
- William Stroudley (1870–1889) – died in office
- R. J. Billinton (1890–1904) – died in office
- D. E. Marsh (1905–1911)
- L. B. Billinton (1912–1922)

=== Carriage and wagon superintendent ===
- Albert Panter (1912–1922)

=== Fireman ===
- Lillian Lawrence, one of Britain's most prolific model steam locomotive designers, was employed as a fireman on the LB&SCR in her youth, and later took its initials, LBSC, as her pseudonym.

== Industrial relations ==
London, Brighton and South Coast Railway (Pensions) Act 1899
- Act of Parliament
- Parliament of the United Kingdom
- Long title: An Act to provide for the establishment and regulation of a Pension Fund for officers and servants of the London Brighton and South Coast Railway Company.
- Citation: 62 & 63 Vict. c. liv

Dates
- Royal assent: 13 July 1899

Text of statute as originally enacted

For its time, the LB&SCR was regarded as a good employer. In 1851 it created a benevolent fund for staff who had become incapacitated, and from 1854 operated a savings bank. In 1867 there was a two-day strike involving the drivers and firemen over their working hours, resolved by negotiation. In 1872 a superannuation fund was established for higher grades of staff, extended to become a pension fund for all staff in 1899 under the London, Brighton and South Coast Railway (Pensions) Act 1899 (62 & 63 Vict. c. liv).

Labour relations between the railway management, locomotive crews and Brighton works staff declined markedly in the period 1905 and 1910 leading to several strikes and sackings. This was partly due to increased union militancy and to the intransigency of the Locomotive Superintendent Douglas Earle Marsh. This situation improved under Marsh's successor.

== See also ==
- List of early British railway companies
- Locomotives of the London, Brighton and South Coast Railway
- List of LB&SCR ships

== Bibliography ==
- Acworth, W.M. "The London and Brighton Railway". Murray's Magazine 4 (19) (July 1888). London: John Murray.
- Ahrons, Ernest L. (1953). Locomotive & Train Working in the Latter Part of the Nineteenth Century. Cambridge: Heffer. OCLC 11899921
- Awdry, Christopher (1990). Encyclopaedia of British Railway Companies. Sparkford: Patrick Stephens. ISBN 1-85260-049-7.
- Baxter, Bertram; Baxter, David (1977). British Locomotive Catalogue, 1825–1923. Buxton: Moorland. ISBN 978-0-903485-50-0.
- Bonavia, Michael R. (1987). The History of the Southern Railway. London: Unwin Hyman. ISBN 0-04-385107-X.
- Bradley, Donald Laurence (1969). Locomotives of the London Brighton and South Coast Railway: Part 1. Railway Correspondence and Travel Society.
- Bradley, D.L. (1972). Locomotives of the London Brighton and South Coast Railway: Part 2. Railway Correspondence and Travel Society.
- Bradley, D.L. (1974). Locomotives of the London Brighton and South Coast Railway: Part 3. Railway Correspondence and Travel Society.
- Burtt, Frank (1975) The locomotives of the London Brighton and South Coast Railway 1839-190, 2nd edition, 3.Branch Line
- Burtt, Frank; Beckerlegge, W. (1948). Pullman and Perfection. London: Ian Allan. OCLC 316139331
- Cooper, B.K. (1981). Rail Centres: Brighton. Nottingham: Booklaw. ISBN 1-901945-11-1.
- Cooper, Peter (1990) LBSCR Stock Book. Cheltenham: Runpast. ISBN 1-870754-13-1.
- Dawson, Philip, (1921). Report by Sir Philip Dawson on Proposed Substitution of Electric for Steam Operation for Suburban, Local and Mainline Passenger and Freight Services. London Brighton and South Coast Railway.
- Dendy Marshall, Chapman Frederick; Kidner, Roger Wakely. A History of the Southern Railway. 2nd edition. London: Ian Allan 1963. Originally published 1936. OCLC 315039503
- Eborall, C.W.; Smiles, S. (1863). Report of the General Manager and Secretary on the Relations of the South Eastern and Brighton Companies. London: South Eastern Railway.
- Eddolls, John (1983). The Brighton line. Newton Abbot: David and Charles. ISBN 0-7153-8251-9.
- Ellis, C. Hamilton (1960). The London, Brighton and South Coast Railway: A Mechanical History of the London and Brighton, the London and Croydon, and the London, Brighton and South Coast Railways from 1839 to 1922. London: Ian Allan. OCLC 500637942
- Fryer, C.E.J. (1997). A History of Slipping and Slip Carriages. Usk: Oakwood Press. ISBN 978-0-85361-514-9
- Gordon, W.J. (1910) Our Home Railways. London: F.J. Warne.
- Gray, Adrian (1997). The London to Brighton Line 1841–1977. Blandford Forum: Oakwood Press. OCLC 4570078
- Hawkins, Chris; Reeve, George (1979). An Historical Survey of Southern Sheds. Oxford: Oxford Publishing. ISBN 0-86093-020-3.
- Haworth, R.B. Miramar Ship Index (Requires Login). Wellington, New Zealand.
- Heap, Christine; van Riemsdijk, John (1980). The Pre-Grouping Railways part 2. H.M.S.O. for the Science Museum. ISBN 0-11-290309-6.
- Hoare, John (1974). Railway Architecture in Sussex. Sussex Industrial History, Sussex Industrial History Society, 6.
- Jordan, S. (1998). Ferry Services of the London, Brighton & South Coast Railway. Usk: The Oakwood Press. ISBN 0-85361-521-7.
- Jackson, Alan A. (1978). London's Local Railways. Newton Abbott, David & Charles. ISBN 0-7153-7479-6
- Kidner, R.W. (1984). Southern suburban steam 1860–1967. The Oakwood Press. ISBN 0-85361-298-6.
- Lawson, W.R. (1891). The Brighton Railway: Its Resources and Prospects. London: "Financial Times" Office. OCLC 55652812
- London Brighton and South Coast Railway Official Guide. (1912), LB&SCR.
- The London Brighton and South Coast Railway Co. 1846–1922. (1923) London Brighton and South Coast Railway.
- London Brighton & South Coast Railway (1867). Report of the Committee of Investigation. LB&SCR.
- Dendy Marshall, C.F. (1968). History of the Southern Railway. Ian Allan. ISBN 0-7110-0059-X.
- Marx, Klaus (2005). Douglas Earle Marsh: His Life and Times. Oakwood Press, ISBN 978-0-85361-633-7.
- Marx, Klaus (2007). Lawson Billinton: A Career Cut Short. Oakwood Press, ISBN 978-0-85361-661-0.
- Marx, Klaus (2008). Robert Billinton: An Engineer Under Pressure. Usk: The Oakwood Press, ISBN 978-0-85361-676-4.
- Measom, George S. (1863). The Official Illustrated Guide to the Brighton and South Coast Railways and All Their Branches. London: Collins. OCLC 55653470
- Mitchell, Vic and Smith, Keith (1983) South Coast Railways p- Brighton to Worthing. Middleton Press.
- Moody, George T. (1968). Southern Electric 1909–1968. London: Ian Allan. ISBN 978-0-7110-0017-9.
- Ottley, George (1965). A Bibliography of British Railway History. London: George Allen & Unwin.
- Pratt, Edwin A. (1921). British railways and the Great War. London: Selwyn & Blount. OCLC 1850596
- "Railway amalgamation", (1875) Saturday Review. 3 April pp. 430–31.
- Rich, Frederick 'Yesterday once more: a story of Brighton stea', Bromley, P.E. Waters & Associates, 1996.
- Richards, Henry Walter Huntingford (1923). "Twelve years' operation of electric traction on the London Brighton and South Coast Railway", Proceedings of the Institution of Civil Engineers, Session 1922–1923. London: Institution of Civil Engineers.
- "Reconstruction of the Grosvenor Hotel", (1901), British Architect. 4 January, p. 17.
- Riley, R.C. (1967). Brighton Line Album. London: Ian Allan. p. 8. ISBN 0711003939.
- Robertson, K. (1985). The Southsea Railway. Southampton: Kingfisher. ISBN 0-946184-16-X.
- Searle, Muriel V. (1986). Down the Line to Brighton. Baton Transport. OCLC 60079352
- Sekon, G.A. (1895). History of the South Eastern Railway. Economic Printing and Publishing Co.
- Sherrington, C.E.R. The Economics of Rail Transport in Great Britain. London, Edward Arnold & Co., 1928.
- Spence, Jeoffry (1952). The Caterham Railway: The Story of a Feud and Its Aftermath. Oakwood Press.
- Swiggum, S.; Kohli, M. The Ships List. London, Brighton & South Coast Railway Company.
- "Termination of the strike on the London, Brighton and South Coast Railway". Hampshire Telegraph and Sussex Chronicle. 30 March 1867.
- Turner, John Howard (1977), The London Brighton and South Coast Railway 1 Origins and Formation. Batsford, ISBN 0-7134-0275-X
- Turner, John Howard (1978), The London Brighton and South Coast Railway 2 Establishment and Growth. Batsford, ISBN 0-7134-1198-8
- Turner, John Howard (1979), The London Brighton and South Coast Railway 3 Completion and Maturity. Batsford, ISBN 0-7134-1389-1.
- White, H.P. (1961). A Regional History of the Railways of Great Britain: II. Southern England. Phoenix House.
