= LB&SCR C class =

- C class No.96 in 1882
Type and origin
- Power type: Steam
- Designer: William Stroudley
- Builder: LBSCR Brighton Works and Kitson & Co.
- Build date: 1871–1874
- Total produced: 20
Specifications
- Configuration
  - Whyte: 0-6-0
  - UIC: Cn
- Gauge: 4 ft 8 1/2 in (1,435 mm) standard gauge
- Driver dia.: 5 ft 0 in (1.524 m)
- Wheelbase: 15 ft 3 in (4.65 m)
- Length: 48 ft 7 in (14.81 m)
- Total weight: 63.1 long tons (64.1 t; 70.7 short tons)
- Fuel type: Coal
- Fuel capacity: 6.5 long tons (6.6 t; 7.3 short tons)
- Water cap.: 2,520 imp gal (11,500 L; 3,030 US gal)
- Firebox
  - Grate area: 20.9 sq ft (1.94 m^{2})
- Boiler pressure: 140 psi (9.65 bar; 0.97 MPa)
- Heating surface
  - Firebox: 101 sq ft (9.4 m^{2})
  - Tubes: 1,312 sq ft (121.9 m^{2})
- Cylinders: Two, inside
- Cylinder size: 18 1/4 in × 26 in (464 mm × 660 mm)
Performance figures
- Tractive effort: 18,400 lbf (81.85 kN)
Career
- Withdrawn: 1901–1904
- Disposition: All scrapped

The London, Brighton and South Coast Railway (LB&SCR) C class was a type of 0-6-0 freight steam locomotive designed by William Stroudley.

== Background ==
Four 0-6-0 locomotives were on order from Brighton railway works at the time that William Stroudley took over from John Chester Craven as Locomotive Superintendent in 1870. He cancelled this order and replaced it with another for two locomotives of his own design, Nos. 83 and 84 which appeared in December 1871. Eighteen further locomotives were constructed between March 1873 and November 1874, Nos. 77-82 by Brighton works and the remainder by Messrs. Kitson and Company

== Use ==
The class were powerful locomotives for their time and the design was "an archetype for heavy goods engines in Scotland as well as Southern England," but in other respects were Stroudley's least successful design, suffering from poor steaming. Within a decade of their introduction the class was being replaced by his C1 class 0-6-0 design of 1882–87 on the heaviest trains. Nevertheless, they proved to be reliable locomotives and survived for nearly thirty years on secondary freight duties. Members of the class were withdrawn between 1901 and 1904.

== Locomotive summary ==
C class fleet summary
Original Number	Built	Re-number	Date re-numbered	Withdrawal
77	March 1873	401	June 1880	June 1902
78	March 1873	402	June 1880	June 1902
79	April 1873	403	June 1880	June 1902
80	May 1873	404	June 1880	January 1903
81	June 1873	405	June 1880	June 1902
82	July 1873	406	August 1880	March 1903
83	December 1871	407	September 1880	August 1901
84	December 1871	408	September 1880	January 1902
85	June 1873	409	October 1882	November 1902
86	July 1873	410	March 1883	November 1902
87	October 1873	411	March 1883	November 1902
88	October 1873	412	March 1883	June 1902
89	October 1873	413	April 1883	December 1903
90	November 1873	414	May 1883	December 1903
91	March 1874	415	September 1883	July 1904
92	April 1874	416	September 1883	June 1902
93	June 1874	417	September 1883	November 1902
94	September 1874	418	September 1883	July 1904
95	November 1874	419	September 1883	July 1904
96	November 1874	420	September 1883	December 1904

== Sources ==
- Bradley, D.L. (1969). Locomotives of the London Brighton and South Coast Railway: Part 1. Railway Correspondence and Travel Society.
- Hamilton Ellis, Cuthbert (1971). The London Brighton and South Coast Railway. Ian Allan. ISBN 0-7110-0269-X.
