= LCDR Enigma class =

Class of 3 British 2-4-0 locomotives

LCDR L class (also known as Enigma class)
Type and origin
- Power type: Steam
- Designer: William Martley
- Builder: Longhedge
- Build date: 1869-1870
- Total produced: 3
Specifications
- Configuration
  - Whyte: 2-4-0
- Gauge: 4 ft 8 1/2 in (1,435 mm)
- Leading dia.: 4 ft 7 in (1.397 m)
- Driver dia.: 6 ft (1.829 m) and 6 ft 6 in (1.981 m)
- Loco weight: 66 long tons 16 cwt (67.9 t)
- Fuel type: Coal
- Water cap.: 1,400 imp gal (6,364.5 L; 1,681.3 US gal) later 2,400 imp gal (10,910.6 L; 2,882.3 US gal)
- Boiler pressure: 120 psi (0.83 MPa)
- Cylinders: Two
- Cylinder size: 16 in × 24 in (406 mm × 610 mm) later 17 in × 24 in (432 mm × 610 mm)
- Valve gear: Stephenson
Career
- Operators: London, Chatham and Dover Railway; → South Eastern and Chatham Railway
- Class: L
- Nicknames: Enigma
- Withdrawn: 1905–1906
- Disposition: All scrapped

The LCDR L class or Enigma Class was a class of 2-4-0 steam locomotives of the London, Chatham and Dover Railway (LCDR). The class was designed by William Martley and introduced in 1869, intended for services between London and Dover.

== History ==
Martley received authority to build three 0-6-0 shunting locomotives in November 1865, but the company's Longhedge workshops were unable to undertake the order due to other commitments. By the time they were able to do so, in October 1867, there was a more pressing need for 2-4-0 passenger engines and so the order was changed. Further delays meant that the first locomotive was not completed until March 1869. It was intended to call the locomotive Premier but following a remark from Martley that "it was a complete enigma to him how completion was ever achieved", the chairman proposed the name Enigma which was used for the whole class.

The original locomotive was used on express goods trains. Two further very similar locomotives with larger 6 ft 6 in (1.981 m) driving wheels, making them more suited to passenger duties were constructed between May 1869 and June/September 1870, which were regarded as being of the same class. These were named Mermaid and Lothair. No new tenders were built – all three Enigma class locomotives were given second-hand 1,400 imp gal (6,364.5 L; 1,681.3 US gal) tenders taken from Emerald, Amethyst and Onyx of the Ruby class.

The three locomotives performed well and during 1882 Martley's successor William Kirtley, fitted new boilers and larger 17 in × 24 in (432 mm × 610 mm) cylinders. He also provided larger 2,400 imp gal (10,910.6 L; 2,882.3 US gal) tenders. At this time the class became LCDR L class, the names were removed and the locomotives numbered 50–52. These numbers were increased by 459 to become 509–511 following the amalgamation of the LCDR and SER to become the South Eastern and Chatham Railway in 1899.

Name	Works no.	Built	Rebuilt	LCDR Number	SECR Number	Withdrawn
Enigma	1	March 1869	May 1882	50	509	August 1906
Mermaid	2	June 1870	June 1882	51	510; 510A from July 1904	July 1906
Lothair	3	September 1870	June 1882	52	511	December 1905

== Withdrawal ==
The class began to be withdrawn and scrapped from 1905 and all were gone by August 1906. The first two examples had accumulated one million miles at the time of withdrawal.
