= SECR H class =

Class of steam locomotives

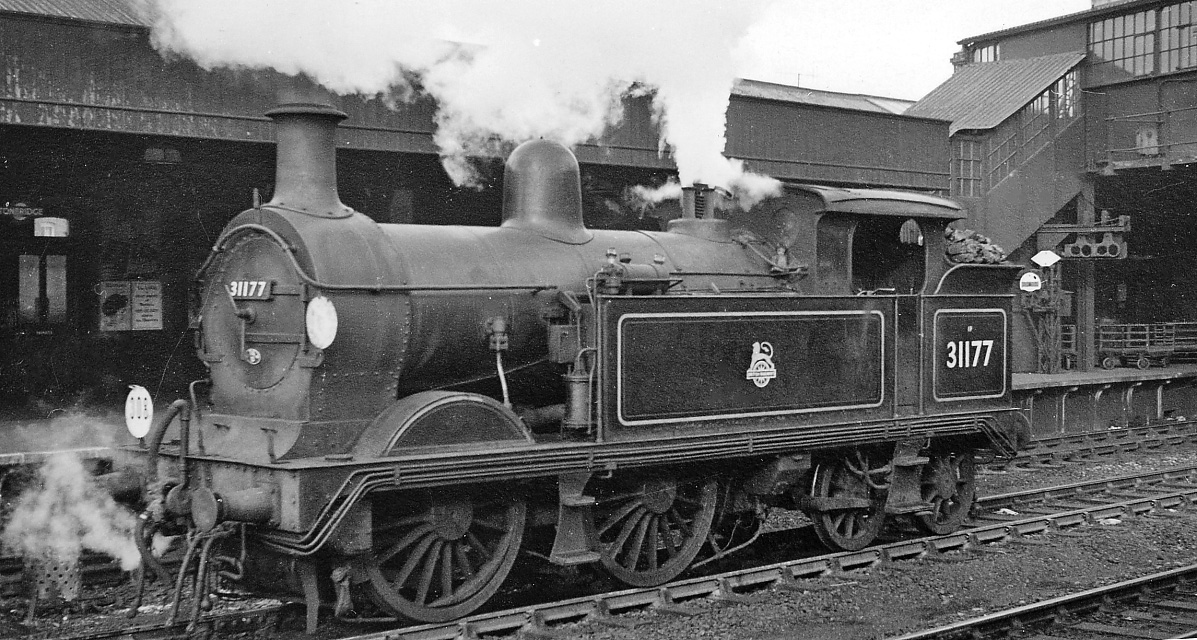
- H class 31177 at Tonbridge in 1958
Type and origin
- Power type: Steam
- Designer: Harry Wainwright
- Builder: SECR Ashford Works
- Build date: 1904–1909, 1915
- Total produced: 66
Specifications
- Configuration
  - Whyte: 0-4-4T
  - UIC: B2′ n2t
- Gauge: 4 ft 8 1/2 in (1,435 mm) standard gauge
- Driver dia.: 5 ft 6 in (1.676 m)
- Trailing dia.: 3 ft 7 in (1.092 m)
- Length: 32 ft 10 3/4 in (10.027 m)
- Axle load: 16 long tons 16 cwt (37,600 lb or 17.1 t)
- Adhesive weight: 33 long tons 12 cwt (75,300 lb or 34.1 t)
- Loco weight: 54 long tons 8 cwt (121,900 lb or 55.3 t)
- Fuel type: Coal
- Fuel capacity: 1 1/2 to 2 1/2 long tons (1.5 to 2.5 t; 1.7 to 2.8 short tons)
- Water cap.: 1,150 to 1,350 imp gal (5,200 to 6,100 L; 1,380 to 1,620 US gal)
- Firebox
  - Grate area: 16 2/3 sq ft (1.55 m^{2})
- Boiler pressure: 160 lbf/in^{2} (1.10 MPa)
- Heating surface
  - Firebox: 102 1/4 sq ft (9.50 m^{2})
  - Tubes: 1,002 1/2 sq ft (93.14 m^{2})
  - Total surface: 1,104 3/4 sq ft (102.63 m^{2})
- Cylinders: Two, inside
- Cylinder size: 18 in × 26 in (457 mm × 660 mm)
Performance figures
- Tractive effort: 17,360 lbf (77.22 kN)
Career
- Operators: South Eastern and Chatham Railway; → Southern Railway; → British Railways
- Class: SECR / SR: H
- Power class: LMS: 2P; BR: 1P
- Locale: Southern Region
- Withdrawn: 1944, 1951–1964
- Disposition: One preserved, remainder scrapped

The South Eastern and Chatham Railway (SECR) H Class is a class of 0-4-4T steam locomotive originally designed for suburban passenger work, designed by Harry Wainwright in 1904. Most of the sixty-six members of the class were later equipped for push-pull working for use on rural branch lines.

== Background ==
The two constituent railways of the SECR had both relied on 0-4-4T locomotives for London suburban, and semi-fast train services. The South Eastern Railway (SER) Q class was introduced in 1881, and the London Chatham and Dover Railway (LCDR) R class in 1891. Of these, the R was the most successful design, and was continued in production (in the form of the LCDR R1 class) by Harry Wainwright after the amalgamation of the railways in 1899. However, as traffic continued to increase there was a need for a new powerful 0-4-4T design to take over from the SER Q class. Wainwright therefore based his new design on the R1 class.

== Construction ==
The first seven locomotives were built by Ashford Works in November and December 1904. The design was soon found to be successful so that sixty-four were built at Ashford between 1904 and 1909. Following Wainwright's retirement Richard Maunsell discovered that in fact sixty-six had been ordered and their components manufactured, but two had not yet been assembled. Therefore the last two sets of parts were collected together and erected in 1915.

The H class boiler design was found to be so successful that it was later used as a standard replacement boiler on the SECR R1 class, LCDR B1 class, LCDR B2 class, LCDR R class, SECR O1 class, SECR Q1 class, and SER R1 class. All 66 locomotives were equipped with vacuum brakes as used on the former SER, but thirteen also had Westinghouse air brakes and were used on the former LCDR lines.

== Use ==
The majority of the class replaced Q class locomotives on the London suburban services of the SER and remained on these duties until after they entered Southern Railway stock in 1923. They began to be displaced by the electrification of these lines in 1925/6, when they began to be used on stopping trains further afield in the Eastern Section of Southern Railway in Kent. After 1929, they also began to be used on the Central Section (the former lines of the London Brighton and South Coast Railway) in East Sussex), where they replaced withdrawn D3 class locomotives. Between 1941 and 1952, two (and later three) examples were loaned to the Western Section and worked from Nine Elms on local shunting and empty stock. During 1943 and 1944 three examples (nos. 1177/84, 1259) were also loaned to the London, Midland and Scottish Railway at Forfar. The LMS power classification was 2P.

Two members of the class (nos. 1264 and 1312) were withdrawn in July and August 1944, due to being beyond economic repair, but the remaining 64 entered British Railways (BR) stock in 1948. BR increased the numbers by 30000. The BR power classification, introduced in January 1949, was 1P. Forty five of the survivors were equipped for push-pull train working between 1949 and 1960, and the class was increasingly used on motor-trains on rural branches. With the completion of the Kent electrification scheme between 1959 and 1962, most of the surviving members of the class were withdrawn, except for a few examples working the non-electrified lines between Tunbridge Wells and Three Bridges.

Table of withdrawals
Year	Quantity in service at start of year	Quantity withdrawn	Locomotive numbers	Notes
1944	66	2	1264, 1312	
1945–50	64	0	–	
1951	64	5	31016, 31182, 31532/41/46	
1952–53	59	0	–	
1954	59	1	31311	
1955	58	4	31158, 31309/20, 31531	
1956	54	0	–	
1957	54	2	31274, 31321	
1958	52	1	31184	
1959	51	11	31164, 31259/69/79/95, 31327/29, 31503/23/48/54	
1960	40	7	31239/65–66, 31310/19, 31520/40	
1961	33	18	31161–62/77/93, 31261/76, 31306–07/22/26/28, 31500/12/17/19/50/52–53	
1962	15	8	31278, 31305/08/24, 31521/30/33/42	
1963	7	4	31005, 31522/43–44	
1964	3	3	31263, 31518/51	31263 preserved

== Accidents and incidents ==
- On 11 March 1913, locomotive No. 324 was hauling a passenger train that failed to stop at Ramsgate Town station, Kent. It collided with a van and pushed it through the buffers. Ten people were injured. The accident was caused by the failure to connect the brake pipe between the locomotive and its train.

== Preservation ==
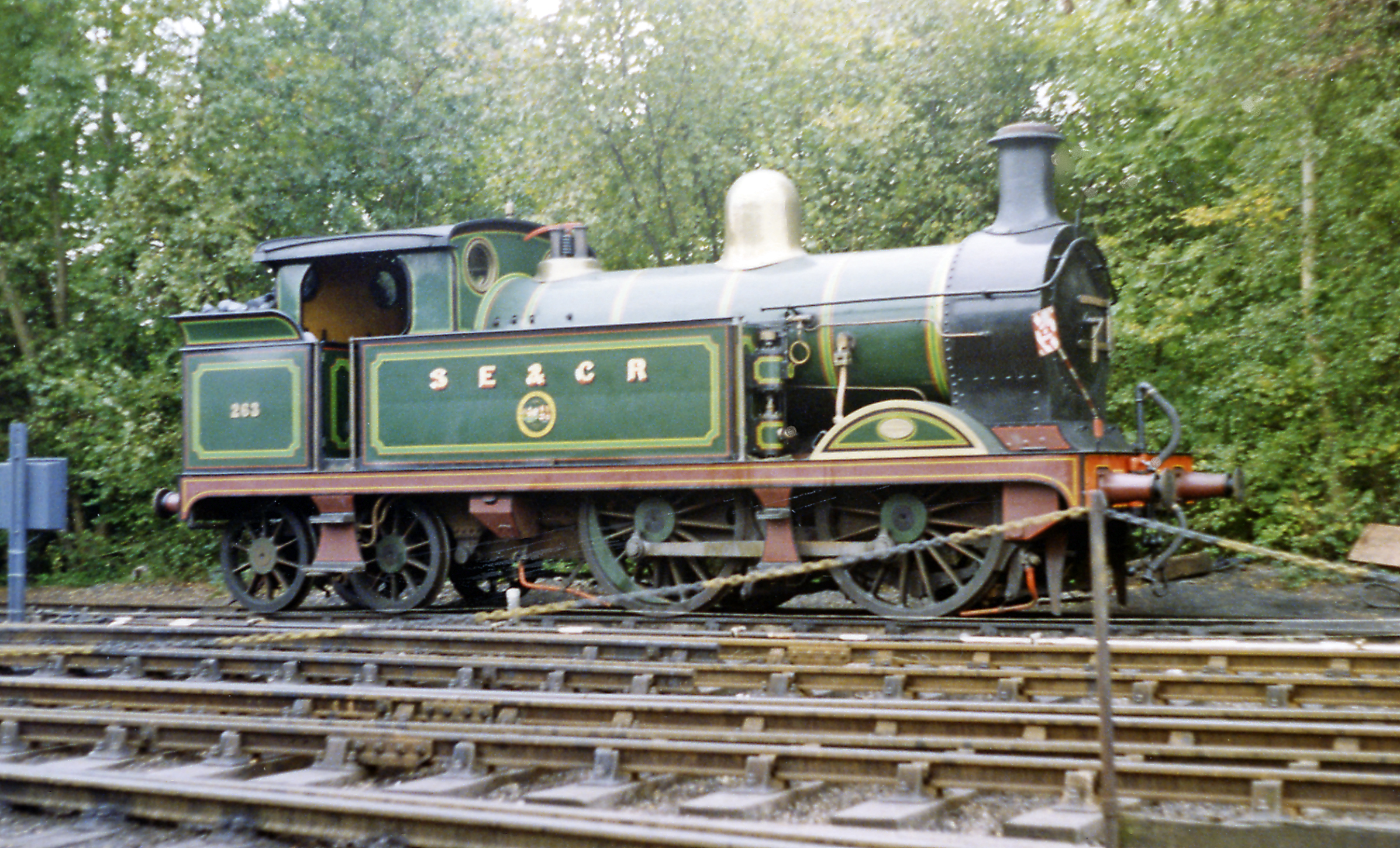
No. 263 at Sheffield Park, Bluebell Railway 11 October 1992.

The final member of the class, SECR No. 263 (SR 1263, BR 31263), was withdrawn from Three Bridges on 4 January 1964. It remained in store at the locomotive depot until the following November, when it was purchased by the H-Class Trust and moved to Robertsbridge. Later it was preserved at the South Eastern Steam Centre at Ashford, but in 1975 the Trustees decided that the locomotive would have more scope for running if based on the Bluebell Railway in Sussex. In 2008 ownership was transferred to the Bluebell Railway Trust, which funded an overhaul that started in March 2009. It returned to service on 28 July 2012.

== Models ==
Hornby announced in 2016 that they would be releasing a model of the H class in 3 liveries. The model was released in 2017.
