= LCDR Ruby class =

Class of 2-4-0 steam locomotives

The LCDR Ruby class was a class of six 2-4-0 steam locomotives purchased by William Martley for the London, Chatham and Dover Railway (LCDR) to haul passenger trains.

During 1861, the LCDR was experiencing difficulty in obtaining sufficient locomotives with which to work their traffic. Orders had been placed for new locomotives, but delivery was delayed. Hence, the company bought several locomotives secondhand, some from British sources. The same year, James Staats Forbes was appointed to the post of general manager of the LCDR; he had recently been general manager of the Dutch Rhenish Railway (DRR), and knew that the DRR had some surplus locomotives. Martley was sent to Rotterdam in June 1861 to inspect them, and if they proved suitable, purchase them for £2,500 each including tenders but excluding delivery.

The six locomotives purchased had been built for the DRR during September–October 1856 by Sharp, Stewart and Company (order no. E316, placed 26 May 1856; works nos. 942–7); the cost to the DRR was £2,480 for each engine and tender. They formed the last of three orders totalling 36 similar locomotives (nos. 1–36) supplied to the DRR by Sharp Stewart between 1854 and 1856. While on the DRR, nos. 31–36 had run between 10,530 and 32,564 miles (16,946 and 52,407 km) each. After their purchase by the LCDR had been agreed, four of the locomotives were shipped (without tenders) to Faversham where they arrived on 29 July 1861, the tenders and the final two locomotives arriving on 9 September. At Faversham, they were inspected, painted in LCDR livery and given nameplates, following which they entered service on the London to Dover express passenger trains.

After a few years service on express trains, additional tender locomotives more suitable for these trains became available owing to the 1862–65 rebuilding of the Tiger class. The Ruby class were then transferred to local passenger trains, where their tenders were found to be inconvenient. Accordingly, during 1864–65 they were rebuilt at Longhedge Railway Works into 2-4-0 tank locomotives at a cost of £128 each. The necessary modifications were few – besides the removal of the tenders, a bunker was built onto the back of the footplate and two side tanks were added, with a combined water capacity of 500 imperial gallons (2,300 L; 600 US gal). To make way for the tanks, the springs of the coupled axles were moved from above the footplate to beneath the axleboxes. Five of the six tenders are known to have been re-used: in 1869–70, those from Emerald, Amethyst and Onyx were attached to new Enigma class locomotives Enigma, Mermaid and Lothair, whilst others were attached to the two Huz class 0-6-0 locomotives that were bought from Sharp Stewart in 1873.

Like other LCDR locomotives delivered prior to 1874, the locomotives had no numbers at first, being distinguished by name. In November 1875, William Kirtley (who had replaced Martley following the latter's death in 1874) allotted the class letter R to the Ruby class. The locomotives were then allotted the numbers 65–70, but these may not have been carried: the new LCDR A class were delivered during 1875, and some of these took the numbers 65–70, as a result of which the R class were numbered 145–150 instead. New boilers and cylinders were fitted during 1876–77. Withdrawal occurred between October 1889 and November 1891.

Works no.	Built 2-4-0	DRR Number	To LCDR	LCDR Name	Rebuilt 2-4-0T	First LCDR Number	Second LCDR Number	Reboilered	Withdrawn
957	1856	31	August 1861	Onyx	September 1864	65	145	April 1877	April 1891
958	1856	32	August 1861	Emerald	September 1864	66	146	December 1876	October 1889
959	1856	33	August 1861	Diamond	November 1864	67	147	April 1877	July 1891
960	1856	34	August 1861	Ruby	March 1865	68	148	April 1877	October 1890
961	1856	35	October 1861	Amethyst	August 1864	69	149	December 1876	October 1889
962	1856	36	October 1861	Pearl	June 1864	70	150	April 1877	November 1891
