= LCDR Europa class =

LCDR Europa class (later C class)
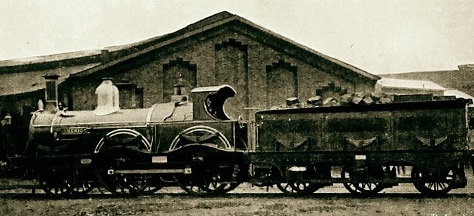
- London Chatham & Dover Railway C (Europa) class America
Type and origin
- Power type: Steam
- Designer: William Martley
- Builder: Sharp, Stewart and Company (4); Longhedge Works (2)
- Serial number: SS: 2331–2334
- Build date: 1873–1876
- Total produced: 6
Specifications
- Configuration
  - Whyte: 2-4-0
  - UIC: 1B n2
- Gauge: 4 ft 8 1/2 in (1,435 mm)
- Leading dia.: 4 ft 6 in (1,372 mm)
- Driver dia.: 6 ft 6 in (1,981 mm)
- Adhesive weight: 24 long tons 6 cwt (24.7 t)
- Loco weight: 36 long tons 5 cwt (36.8 t)
- Total weight: 66 long tons 16 cwt (67.9 t)
- Fuel type: Coal
- Fuel capacity: 3.5 long tons (3.6 t)
- Water cap.: 2,400 imp gal (11,000 L; 2,900 US gal)
- Firebox
  - Type
  - Grate area: 16 1/4 sq ft (1.51 m^{2})
- Boiler
  - Diameter: 4 ft 3 in (1.295 m)
  - Tube plates: 10 ft 10 in (3.302 m)
- Boiler pressure: 140 psi (0.97 MPa)
- Heating surface
  - Firebox: 100 sq ft (9.3 m^{2})
  - Tubes: 1,080 sq ft (100 m^{2})
  - Total surface
- Cylinders: Two
- Cylinder size: 17 in × 24 in (432 mm × 610 mm)
- Valve gear: Stephenson
Career
- Operators: London, Chatham and Dover Railway; → South Eastern and Chatham Railway
- Class: LCDR:Europa → C
- Withdrawn: 1907–1909
- Disposition: All scrapped

The LCDR C class or Europa Class was a class of 2-4-0 steam locomotives of the London, Chatham and Dover Railway (LCDR). The class was designed by William Martley and introduced in 1873, intended for the heaviest express services between London and Dover.

== History ==
The LCDR was successful in winning a government contract for the delivery of British mails to the Continent from the South Eastern Railway (SER) in 1873 and required a new class of locomotives for the mail trains as the punctuality of these services was essential to its retention. William Martley the locomotive superintendent of the railway designed the class and obtained permission for four locomotives to be built by Sharp, Stewart and Company at a cost of £2,930 per locomotive to be delivered by October 1873. These were named Europa, Asia, Africa and America but, like other LCDR locomotives built before 1875, were unnumbered when new.

The locomotives performed well and Martley therefore sought authority to purchase a further five, but this request was refused. He was however granted authority to build the locomotives at the company’s own Longhedge Railway Works in 1874. Work on two of these had barely started at the time of Martley’s death in the same year. Construction of these was halted, but eventually restarted and completed in 1876 by Martley’s successor William Kirtley, although the order for the three remaining examples was cancelled. The boilers for these three, which had been supplied by Nasmyth, Wilson & Co. in late 1875, were later used by Kirtley for other purposes.

The two new locomotives were numbered 57 and 58; in the meantime, the first four members of the class were numbered 53-56 in January 1875, although their names were retained until they were reboilered in 1892. These numbers were increased by 459 to become 512–517 following the amalgamation of the LCDR and SER to become the South Eastern and Chatham Railway in 1899. Under William Kirtley's classification scheme the locomotives became the 'C class'.

Name	Builder	Works no.	Built	LCDR Number	SECR Number	Withdrawn
Europa	Sharp Stewart	2331	September 1873	53	512	April 1909
Asia	Sharp Stewart	2332	September 1873	54	513	February 1909
Africa	Sharp Stewart	2333	October 1873	55	514	January 1908
America	Sharp Stewart	2334	October 1873	56	515	December 1907
India (Note: Name not carried)	Longhedge	4	August 1876	57	516	May 1908
Ethiopia	Longhedge	5	November 1876	58	517	February 1909
Agulhas	Longhedge	(Cancelled)		—	—	—
Malabar	Longhedge	(Cancelled)		—	—	—
Coromandel	Longhedge	(Cancelled)		—	—	—

== Use ==
The class was used on both the Dover-Calais boat trains and on new services to Flushing via Queenborough Pier after May 1876. After 1876 they were replaced on the heaviest services by the LCDR M class 4-4-0, although they continued to be used on express services until the turn of the century and were considered worthy of re-boilering between 1890 and 1892.

== Withdrawal ==
The class was withdrawn and scrapped between December 1907 April 1909. The four earliest examples had each accumulated more than one million miles by then.
