= LCDR M2 class =

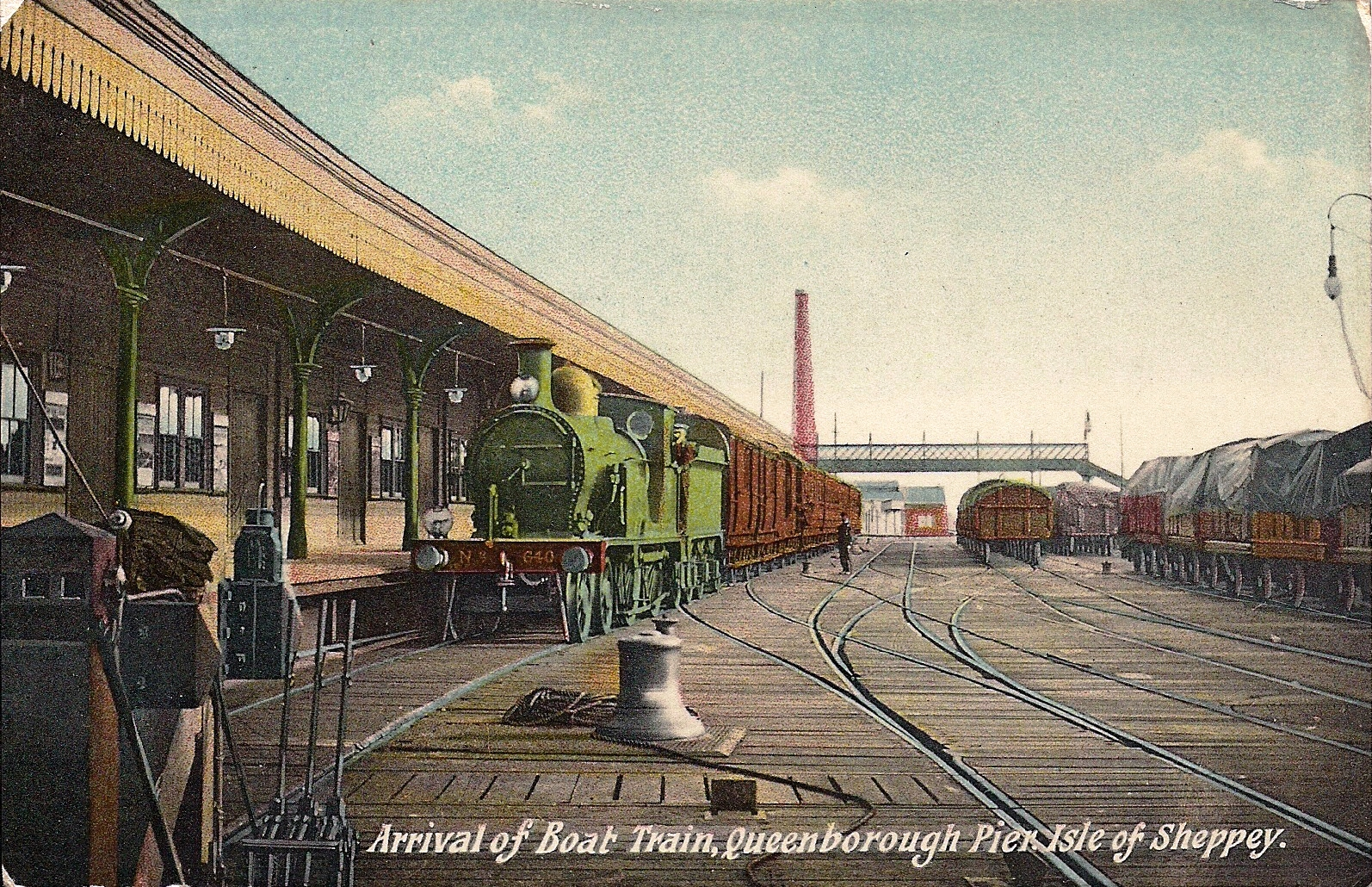
- A postcard showing No. 640 at Queenborough Pier railway station
Type and origin
- Power type: Steam
- Designer: William Kirtley
- Builder: Dübs and Company and Longhedge Works
- Build date: 1884-1885
- Total produced: 8
Specifications
- Configuration
  - Whyte: 4-4-0
- Gauge: 4 ft 8 1/2 in (1,435 mm)
- Driver dia.: 6 ft 6 in (1.981 m)
- Loco weight: 72 long tons 10 hundredweight (73.7 t)
- Fuel type: Coal
- Boiler pressure: 140 psi (0.97 MPa)
- Cylinders: Two, Stephenson valve gear
- Cylinder size: 17.5 in × 26 in (444 mm × 660 mm)
Career
- Operators: LCDR • SECR •
- Class: M2
- Number in class: 1 January 1923: 1
- Withdrawn: 1912-1923
- Disposition: All scrapped

The LCDR M2 class was a class of 4-4-0 steam locomotives of the London, Chatham and Dover Railway. The class was designed by William Kirtley and introduced in 1884.

== History ==
The class were a development of Kirtley's earlier M and M1 classes intended for the London-Dover boat trains. They proved to be moderately successful for these tasks but soon needed to superseded on the heaviest trains by the larger M3 class The locomotives passed to the South Eastern and Chatham Railway in 1899 and were considered to be sufficiently useful to be worth re-boilering between 1898 and 1903. The class began to be withdrawn and scrapped from 1912. Only one example survived into Southern Railway ownership in 1923, but was withdrawn almost immediately thereafter.
