= LCDR R class =

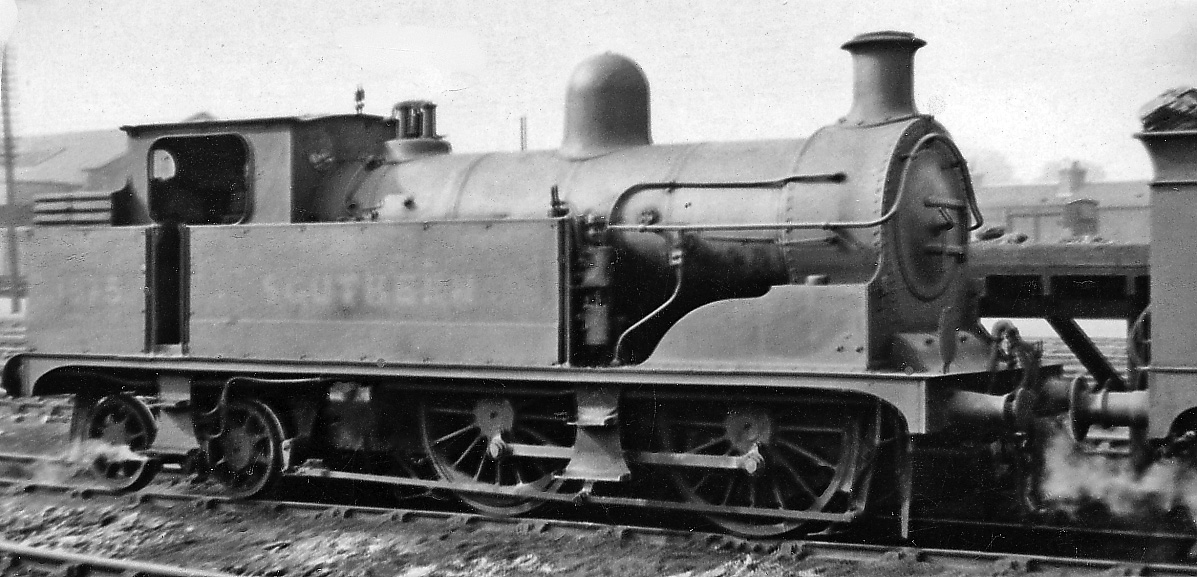
- No. 1675 at Tonbridge Locomotive Depot, 18 May 1946
Type and origin
- Power type: Steam
- Designer: William Kirtley
- Builder: Sharp, Stewart & Co
- Serial number: 3722–3739
- Build date: September–December 1891
- Total produced: 18
Specifications
- Configuration
  - Whyte: 0-4-4T
  - UIC: B2′ n2t
- Gauge: 4 ft 8 1/2 in (1,435 mm)
- Driver dia.: 5 ft 6 in (1.676 m)
- Wheelbase: 21 ft 6 in (6.55 m)
- Loco weight: 49.75 long tons (50.55 t)
- Fuel capacity: 2 long tons (2.0 t)
- Water cap.: 1,100 imp gal (5,000 L; 1,300 US gal)
- Firebox
  - Grate area: 16.25 sq ft (1.510 m^{2})
- Boiler pressure: 150 psi (1.03 MPa)
- Heating surface: 1,071 sq ft (99.5 m^{2})
- Cylinders: Two, inside
- Cylinder size: 17 in × 24 in (432 mm × 610 mm)
- Train brakes: Westinghouse
Career
- Operators: London, Chatham and Dover Railway; → South Eastern and Chatham Railway; → Southern Railway; → British Railways
- Class: R
- Numbers: LCDR: 199–216; SECR: 658–675; SR: A658–A675 → 1658–1675; BR: 31658–31675
- Nicknames: Bobtails
- Withdrawn: May 1940 – December 1955
- Disposition: All scrapped

The LCDR R class was a class of 0-4-4T locomotives on the London, Chatham and Dover Railway (LCDR). No. 207 (eventually no. 31666) is notable as being the last former LCDR locomotive to be withdrawn from service. The whole class was fitted with condensing apparatus for working on the Widened Lines.

== History ==
For many years the London, Chatham and Dover Railway (LCDR) had favoured the 0-4-4T wheel arrangement for suburban and stopping passenger trains, and when more were required in 1890, consideration was given to ordering a further batch of the existing A2 class 0-4-4T (introduced 1883); it was then decided that a modified design was required. The new locomotives were designed by William Kirtley as a development of his earlier A2 class, and 18 were built by Sharp, Stewart and Company in 1891. The new locomotives were originally classified A3, but this was altered to R when that class letter was vacated with the withdrawal of the last of the Ruby class in November 1891.

== Numbering ==
Their LCDR numbers were 199–216, which under the South Eastern and Chatham Railway became 658–675 from 1899. They were renumbered three more times: to A658–A675 by the Southern Railway (SR) from 1923; to 1658–1675 by the SR from 1931; and to 31658–31675 by British Railways from 1948.

== Withdrawal ==
Three (Nos. 1664, 1668 and 1669) were withdrawn in 1940 to provides spares for the others, and withdrawal of the rest occurred between 1949 and 1955.

Table of withdrawals
Year	Quantity in service at start of year	Quantity withdrawn	Numbers
1940	18	3	1664, 1668, 1669
1949	15	1	31672
1951	14	3	31659, 31667, 31670
1952	11	5	31658, 31665, 31673–31675
1953	6	3	31660, 31662, 31663
1954	3	1	31671
1955	2	2	31661, 31666

== See also ==
- LCDR R1 class
