= LCDR M3 class =

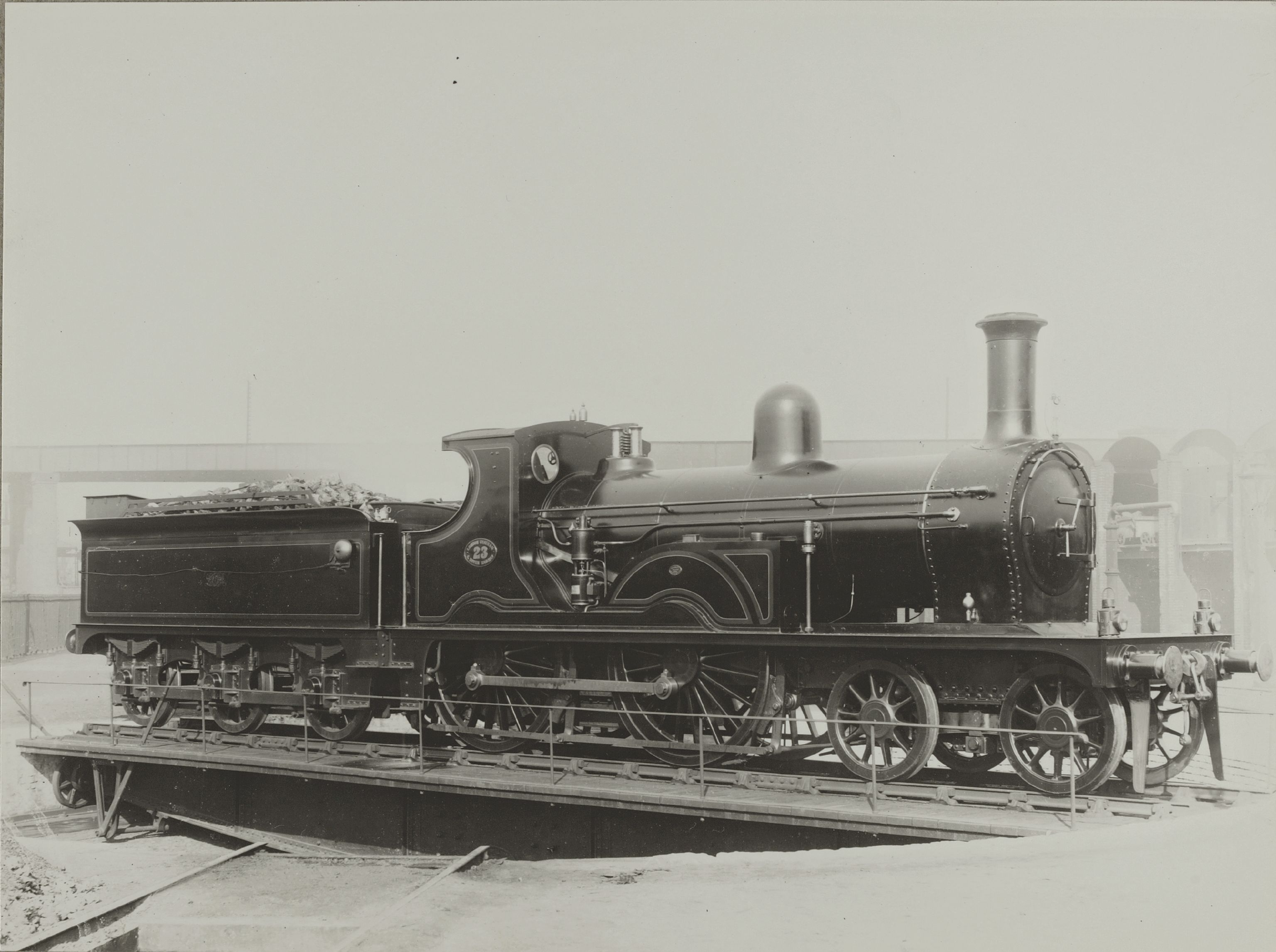
Type and origin
- Power type: Steam
- Designer: William Kirtley
- Builder: Vulcan Foundry (6); Longhedge Works (20)
- Serial number: VF 1317–1322
- Build date: 1891–1901
- Total produced: 26
Specifications
- Configuration
  - Whyte: 4-4-0
  - UIC: 2′B
- Gauge: 4 ft 8 1/2 in (1,435 mm)
- Driver dia.: 6 ft 6 in (1.981 m)
- Loco weight: 76.1 long tons (77.3 t)
- Fuel type: Coal
- Water cap.: 2,600 imperial gallons (11,819.8 L; 3,122.5 US gal)
- Boiler pressure: 150 psi (1.03 MPa)
- Cylinders: Two
- Cylinder size: 18 in × 26 in (457 mm × 660 mm)
- Valve gear: Stephenson
Performance figures
- Tractive effort: 13,770 lbf (61.3 kN)
Career
- Operators: London, Chatham and Dover Railway; → South Eastern and Chatham Railway; → Southern Railway
- Class: M3
- Number in class: 1 January 1923: 26
- Withdrawn: 1925–1928
- Disposition: All scrapped

The LCDR M3 class was a class of 4-4-0 steam locomotives of the London, Chatham and Dover Railway. The class was designed by William Kirtley and introduced in 1891.

== History ==
The class were an enlargement of Kirtley's earlier M1 and M2 classes intended for the London-Dover boat trains. They proved to be successful for these tasks for more than a decade. The locomotives passed to the South Eastern and Chatham Railway in 1899 after which they were superseded on the heaviest trains by the SECR D class between 1903 and 1905 and transferred to secondary duties. The class was nevertheless considered to be sufficiently useful to be worth re-boilering between 1909 and 1917.

The entire class survived into Southern Railway ownership in 1923, but the appearance of the King Arthur class on the line after 1925 meant that they had all been withdrawn and scrapped by 1928.
