= SECR C class =

Class of 109 British locomotives

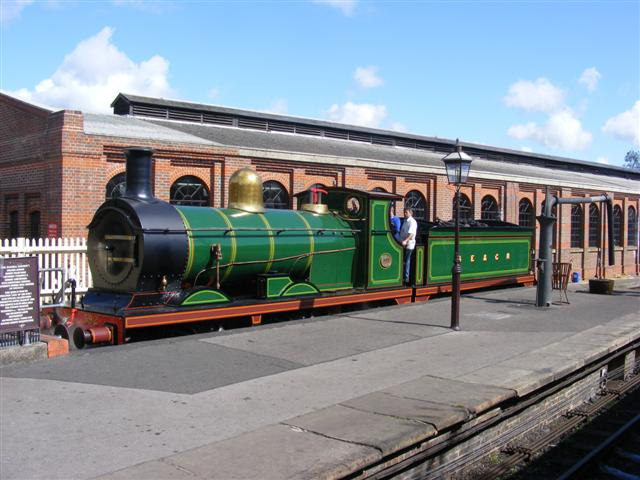
- C class 592 after its latest overhaul, August 2007.
Type and origin
- Power type: Steam
- Designer: Harry Wainwright
- Builder: SECR Ashford Works (70); SECR Longhedge Works (9); Neilson, Reid & Co. (15); Sharp, Stewart & Co. (15)
- Serial number: Neilson, Reid: 5687–5701; Sharp, Stewart: 4683–97
- Build date: 1900–1908
- Total produced: 109
Specifications
- Configuration
  - Whyte: 0-6-0
  - UIC: C n2
- Gauge: 4 ft 8 1/2 in (1,435 mm) standard gauge
- Driver dia.: 5 ft 2 in (1.575 m)
- Loco weight: 43 long tons 16 cwt (98,100 lb or 44.5 t); 43 long tons 16 hundredweight (44.5 t; 49.1 short tons)
- Fuel type: Coal
- Boiler pressure: 160 lbf/in^{2} (1.10 MPa)
- Superheater: None
- Cylinders: Two, inside
- Cylinder size: 18 1/2 in × 26 in (470 mm × 660 mm)
- Valve gear: Stephenson
Performance figures
- Tractive effort: 19,520 lbf (86.83 kN)
Career
- Operators: South Eastern and Chatham Railway; Southern Railway; British Railways
- Class: SECR / SR: C
- Power class: BR: 2F
- Locale: Southern Region
- Withdrawn: 1917, 1947–1962
- Disposition: One preserved, remainder scrapped

The South Eastern and Chatham Railway (SECR) C Class is a class of 0-6-0 steam locomotive, designed by Harry Wainwright and built between 1900 and 1908. They were designed for freight duties, although often used for passenger trains too. They operated over the lines of the railway in London and south-east England until the early 1960s. One example was rebuilt as an S Class saddle tank.

== History ==
The SECR held trials in November 1898 to decide on a standard freight locomotive design. Two existing 0-6-0 locomotives were tested: former London, Chatham and Dover Railway B2 class No. 194 designed by William Kirtley; and former South Eastern Railway O class No. 436 designed by James Stirling. The Kirtley design proved superior and a new order for 40 locomotives based on it was placed. These new locomotives were designed by Harry Wainwright, the new Chief Mechanical Engineer of the railway, and formed the first of the C class.

The first fifteen locomotives were constructed by Neilson, Reid and Company and delivered in June 1900, followed by a further fifteen from Sharp, Stewart and Company. The remainder were built by the SECR workshops at Ashford (70 examples 1900–1908) and Longhedge Works (9 examples 1903–4).

== Operational use ==
The locomotives were used on freight services and occasional passenger excursion trains (such as hop-picking specials), throughout the SER between Reading railway station and the Kent Coast. The last twelve locomotives were fitted with steam carriage heating equipment to enable them to be used to haul and prepare empty stock for express trains. The remainder of the class were also so equipped by the Southern Railway after 1923.

== Accidents ==
- On 20 February 1904, a passenger train hauled by No. 294 derailed at Gomshall, Surrey.
- At 03:40 hrs on 5 May 1919, a goods train from Bricklayers Arms to Margate Sands, Kent overran signals and ran into the back of another goods train just to the west of Paddock Wood station, Kent. The Margate train was hauled by C class No. 721. It consisted of 50 goods vehicles including three brake vans. The other train was hauled by C class No. 61. The fireman of this train was killed in the accident. Although the main cause of the accident was the driver of the Margate train failing to obey signals, the signalman at Tonbridge East signal box was also censured for failure to give the driver adequate warning that although the train had been accepted by the signalman at Paddock Wood, the line was not clear. The signalman at Paddock Wood had accepted the train under Regulation No 5 - "Section clear but station or junction blocked".
- On 18 February 1948, locomotive 1225 was wrongly routed into the north sidings at Goudhurst, Kent and derailed.
- On 4 July 1958, an electric multiple unit overran signals and collided with an empty stock train hauled by locomotive No. 31461 at Maze Hill, London. Forty-five people were injured.

== S class conversion ==
In 1917 one example, no. 685 was converted into an S class 0-6-0ST for use as a heavy-duty shunter at Richborough port which was then being used to ship locomotives and armoured equipment to the Western Front. After the War it was used as a shunter at Bricklayers Arms until 1951.

== Withdrawal ==
In common with other freight locomotives in Southern England, the class was very heavily used during the Second World War and repairs and maintenance deferred. As a result, one locomotive had to be withdrawn in December 1947, but the remaining 107 examples entered service with British Railways in 1948. Withdrawals of the remainder of the class began in 1953, but accelerated after the Kent Coast electrification in 1959–1960. However, three examples (31271, 31280, 31592) remained in Departmental stock as shunters at Ashford Works until 1966.

Table of withdrawals
Year	Quantity in service at start of year	Quantity withdrawn	Locomotive numbers	Notes
1917	109	1	685	Rebuilt as 0-6-0ST, S class. Withdrawn 1951
1918–46	108	0	–	
1947	108	2	1262, 1499	
1948	106	0	–	
1949	106	2	31257, 31460	
1950–51	104	0	–	
1952	104	1	31038	
1953	103	6	31090, 31234/60/91, 31486, 31580	
1954	97	1	31572	
1955	96	7	31225/77/94, 31513, 31687, 31713/18	
1956	89	1	31063	
1957	88	3	31508, 31711–12	
1958	85	5	31018/59, 31461, 31582/93	
1959	80	16	31071, 31191, 31219/21/27/43/45/52–53/70/72/97, 31576/85, 31681/83	31272 to stationary boiler at Ashford Works as DS240.
1960	64	11	31033/54/86, 31102, 31223/87/98, 31581, 31688/92, 31725	
1961	53	0	–	
1962	53	53	31004/37/61/68, 31112–13/50, 31218/29/42/55–56/67–68/71/80/93, 31317, 31480–81/95/98, 31510/73/75/78–79/83–84/88–90/92, 31682/84/86/89–91/93–95, 31714–17/19–24	31592 to Ashford Works as DS239; withdrawn 1966.

== Preservation ==
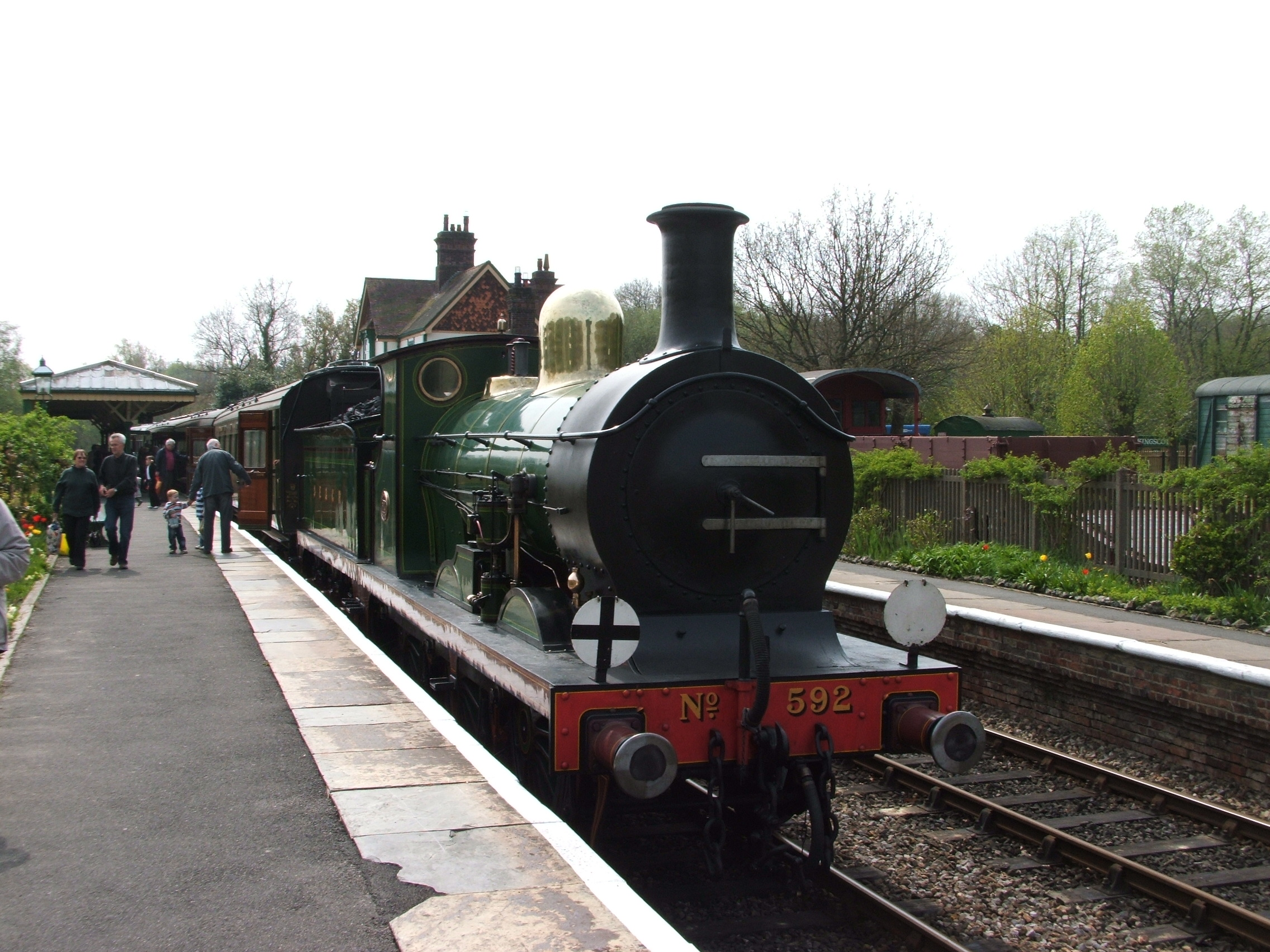
C class 592 at Kingscote Station in April 2009.

One, No. 592 (Southern Railway 1592, BR 31592), has been preserved on the Bluebell Railway. It was featured in the train scene of The Wind in the Willows (1996) and The Railway Children. In 2016, the locomotive was featured in the film, Fantastic Beasts and Where to Find Them.

== Models ==
Bachmann Branchline produces several versions of the C class in OO gauge, following the initial release in 2013. The Bachmann models include the preserved example, as well as liveries from the Southern Railway and British Railways.

Bachmann announced on 8 January 2017 that a British N gauge C Class would form part of their 2017 Graham Farish catalogue range. This is to be produced as SE&CR No. 271 in SE&CR plain green, as well as No. 1294 in Southern Railway Black and No. 31227 in British Railways Black with early British Railways emblem.
