= LCDR M1 class =

Class of railway engines

Type and origin
- Power type: Steam
- Designer: William Kirtley
- Builder: Longhedge Works
- Build date: 1880-1881
- Total produced: 4
Specifications
- Configuration
  - Whyte: 4-4-0
- Gauge: 4 ft 8 1/2 in (1,435 mm)
- Driver dia.: 6 ft 6 in (1.981 m)
- Loco weight: 74 long tons (75.2 t)
- Fuel type: Coal
- Water cap.: 2,550 imperial gallons (11,592.5 L; 3,062.4 US gal)
- Boiler pressure: 140 psi (0.97 MPa)
- Cylinders: Two, Stephenson valve gear
- Cylinder size: 17.5 in × 26 in (444 mm × 660 mm)
Career
- Operators: LCDR • SECR •
- Class: M1
- Number in class: 1 January 1923: 1
- Withdrawn: 1912-1923
- Disposition: All scrapped

The LCDR M1 class was a class of 4-4-0 steam locomotives of the London, Chatham and Dover Railway (LCDR), very similar to the earlier M class but with steel frames, larger tenders and other detailed differences. The class was designed by William Kirtley and introduced in 1880.

== History ==
Kirtley had requested six more examples of his earlier M class built by Neilson and Company for the London-Dover boat trains, but this request was turned down by the LCDR board, although he was given permission to build similar locomotives at the company's Longhedge Works in Battersea. Two locomotives were built during 1880 and a further two in 1881. However a fire in the machine shop seriously delayed work on the final two which eventually appeared as members of the M2 class in 1885. The class proved to be successful and completed high mileages. on the heaviest semi-fast trains. The locomotives passed to the South Eastern and Chatham Railway in 1899 and were considered to be sufficiently useful to be worth re-boilering between 1898 and 1904. The class began to be withdrawn and scrapped from 1912. Only one example survived into Southern Railway ownership in 1923, but was withdrawn almost immediately thereafter.
