= SECR Q1 class =

Type and origin
- Power type: Steam
- Designer: Harry Wainwright
- Rebuild date: 1903–1917
- Number rebuilt: 55
Specifications
- Configuration
  - Whyte: 0-4-4T
  - UIC: B2′ n2t
- Gauge: 4 ft 8 1/2 in (1,435 mm)
- Driver dia.: 5 ft 6 in (1.676 m)
- Loco weight: 49.6 long tons (50.4 t)
- Fuel type: Coal
- Boiler pressure: 150 lbf/in^{2} (1.03 MPa)
- Cylinders: Two, inside
- Cylinder size: 18 in × 26 in (457 mm × 660 mm)
- Valve gear: Stephenson valve gear
Performance figures
- Tractive effort: 16,274 lbf (72.39 kN)
Career
- Operators: South Eastern and Chatham Railway; → Southern Railway
- Class: Q1
- Number in class: 1 January 1923: 47
- Withdrawn: 1909–1930
- Disposition: All scrapped

The SECR Q1 class was a class of 0-4-4T steam locomotives of the South Eastern and Chatham Railway. The class was rebuilt from older Stirling Q class locomotives by Harry Wainwright between 1903 and 1917 by fitting the boiler that had been designed for the H class 0-4-4T in 1902–03.

== Numbering ==
Fifty-five locomotives were rebuilt at Ashford works, retaining their previous numbers which were scattered between 12 and 423. No. 324 was renumbered 324A in 1907; this and seven others were withdrawn between 1909 and 1914 (the boilers from these being used to rebuild further Q class locomotives to Q1) leaving 47 to enter Southern Railway ownership on 1 January 1923; between 1923 and 1926 all except seven (nos. 134, 141, 344, 354, 366, 413, 419) were repainted into SR green livery and their numbers were prefixed with the letter A to denote Ashford works. Withdrawal recommenced in 1925, and all had been withdrawn by the end of 1930.

Rebuilding and withdrawal
Year	Qty rebuilt	Numbers	Qty withdrawn	Numbers	Total in service at end of year
1903	4	180, 184, 319, 362			4
1904					4
1905	5	81, 134, 181, 303, 407			9
1906	5	138, 146, 304, 324, 366			14
1907	2	83, 350			16
1908	1	361			17
1909	2	355, 359	2	319, 324A	17
1910	4	351, 400, 404, 408	1	303	20
1911			1	181	19
1912	11	12, 85, 95, 141, 200, 343, 357, 367, 406, 412, 413	2	180, 304	28
1913	7	115, 168, 344, 364, 365, 403, 416			35
1914	9	50, 58, 76, 224, 347, 348, 363, 402, 420	2	184, 407	42
1915	3	354, 419, 423			45
1916	1	411			46
1917	1	415			47
1918–24					47
1925			3	A224, A348, 354	44
1926			20	A50, A58, A95, 134, 141, A168, A343, 344, A350, A357, A359, A363, 366, A402, A403, 413, A415, A416, 419, A423	24
1927			9	A12, A76, A85, A138, A347, A351, A355, A404, A420	15
1928			8	A81, A83, A115, A146, A200, A365, A406, A411	7
1929			5	A361, A362, A400, A408, A412	2
1930			2	A364, A367	0
