= LCDR T class =

Type and origin
- Power type: Steam
- Designer: William Kirtley
- Builder: LCDR Longhedge Works
- Build date: 1879–1893
- Total produced: 10
Specifications
- Configuration
  - Whyte: 0-6-0T
  - UIC: C n2t
- Gauge: 4 ft 8 1/2 in (1,435 mm)
- Driver dia.: 4 ft 6 in (1.372 m)
- Axle load: 14 long tons 5 cwt (31,900 lb or 14.5 t)
- Loco weight: 40 long tons 15 cwt (91,300 lb or 41.4 t)
- Fuel type: Coal
- Fuel capacity: 1 long ton 5 cwt (2,800 lb or 1.3 t)
- Water cap.: 830 imperial gallons (3,800 L; 1,000 US gal)
- Firebox
  - Grate area: 15 sq ft (1.4 m^{2})
- Boiler pressure: New: 150 psi (1.03 MPa); Later: 160 psi (1.10 MPa)
- Cylinders: Two, inside
- Cylinder size: New: 17 in × 24 in (432 mm × 610 mm); Later: 17 1/2 in × 24 in (444 mm × 610 mm)
- Valve gear: Stephenson
Performance figures
- Tractive effort: 18,509 lbf (82.3 kN)
Career
- Operators: London, Chatham and Dover Railway; → South Eastern and Chatham Railway; → Southern Railway; → British Railways
- Class: T
- Numbers: LCDR: 141–150; SECR: 600–609; SR: A600–A609 → 1600–1609
- Withdrawn: 1932–1951
- Disposition: All scrapped

The LCDR T class was a class of 0-6-0T steam locomotives of the London, Chatham and Dover Railway. The class was designed by William Kirtley and introduced in 1879.

== Numbering ==
Source: semgonline

LCDR no.	SECR no.	SR no.	BR no.
141	600	1600	
142	601	1601	
143	602	1602	31602
144	603	1603	31603
145	604	1604	31604
146	605	1605	
147	606	1606	
148	607	500 S	D500 S
149	608	1608	
150	609	1609	

Notes

1. Sources differ as to whether 1603 or 1604 entered BR ownership
2. Number 607 was transferred to the Service Department and numbered 500 S.

== Ownership changes ==
The locomotives passed to the South Eastern and Chatham Railway in 1899. All 10 (SECR nos. 600-609) survived into Southern Railway ownership in 1923. Three survived into British Railways (BR) ownership in 1948. They had all been withdrawn by 1951.

== Withdrawal ==
Seven locomotives had been withdrawn by 1948. The remaining 3 were withdrawn as follows:

- D500 S in November 1949 from Meldon Quarry
- 31603 in November 1950 from Reading South shed (shed code 70E)
- 31602 in July 1951 from Reading South shed (shed code 70E)

None were preserved.
