= LCDR M class =

Type and origin
- Power type: Steam
- Designer: William Kirtley
- Builder: Neilson and Company
- Serial number: 2221–2226
- Build date: 1877
- Total produced: 6
Specifications
- Configuration
  - Whyte: 4-4-0
  - UIC: 2′B n2
- Gauge: 4 ft 8 1/2 in (1,435 mm)
- Driver dia.: 6 ft 6 in (1.981 m)
- Loco weight: 73 long tons 16 cwt (75.0 t)
- Fuel type: Coal
- Boiler pressure: 140 psi (0.97 MPa)
- Cylinders: Two
- Cylinder size: 17 1/2 in × 26 in (444 mm × 660 mm)
- Valve gear: Stephenson
Career
- Operators: London, Chatham and Dover Railway; → South Eastern and Chatham Railway
- Class: M
- Withdrawn: 1911–1914
- Disposition: All scrapped

The LCDR M class was a class of 4-4-0 steam locomotives of the London, Chatham and Dover Railway. The class was designed by William Kirtley and introduced in 1877, intended for the heaviest express services between London and Dover.

== History ==
William Kirtley took over as locomotive superintendent of the railway following the death of William Martley in 1874. Martley's Europa class 2-4-0 were performing well on the lightly loaded Dover-Flushing boat trains but a larger engine was required for some of the heavier services on the main line. Kirtley therefore designed a 4-4-0 for this purpose. The six locomotives were built by Neilson and Company of Glasgow and introduced during June and July 1877. They proved to be successful for these tasks and were only superseded on the heaviest trains by the larger M3 class The locomotives passed to the South Eastern and Chatham Railway in 1899 and were considered to be sufficiently useful to be worth re-boilering between 1899 and 1903. The class was withdrawn and scrapped from 1911 to 1914.
