= LCDR B class =

Type and origin
- Power type: Steam
- Designer: William Kirtley
- Builder: Dübs and Company
- Serial number: 886–891
- Build date: January – February 1876
- Total produced: 6
Specifications
- Configuration
  - Whyte: 0-6-0
  - UIC: C n2
- Gauge: 4 ft 8 1/2 in (1,435 mm)
- Driver dia.: 4 ft 10 in (1.473 m)
- Wheelbase: 16 ft 0 in (5 m)
- Axle load: 14.50 long tons (14.73 t)
  - 1st coupled: 14.30 long tons (14.53 t)
  - 2nd coupled: 14.50 long tons (14.73 t)
  - 3rd coupled: 12.40 long tons (12.60 t)
- Loco weight: 41.10 long tons (41.76 t)
- Tender weight: 29.75 long tons (30.23 t)
- Fuel type: Coal
- Fuel capacity: 4 3/4 long tons (4.8 t)
- Water cap.: 2,200 imp gal (10,000 L; 2,600 US gal)
- Firebox
  - Grate area: 17 sq ft (1.6 m^{2})
- Boiler
  - Diameter: 4 ft 3 in (1.295 m)
  - Tube plates: 10 ft 3 3/4 in (3.143 m)
- Boiler pressure: 140 lbf/in^{2} (0.97 MPa)
- Heating surface
  - Firebox: 102 sq ft (9.5 m^{2})
  - Tubes: 987 sq ft (91.7 m^{2})
  - Total surface: 1,089 sq ft (101.2 m^{2})
- Cylinders: Two, inside
- Cylinder size: 17 1/2 in × 26 in (444 mm × 660 mm)
- Valve gear: Stephenson
Career
- Operators: London, Chatham and Dover Railway; South Eastern and Chatham Railway
- Class: B1
- Numbers: LCDR: 135–140; SECR: 594–599
- Withdrawn: June 1912 – April 1915
- Disposition: All scrapped

The LCDR B class was a class of 0-6-0 steam locomotives of the London, Chatham and Dover Railway. The class was designed by William Kirtley and introduced in 1876.

The locomotives passed to the South Eastern and Chatham Railway in 1899. And given new boilers between 1899 and 1903. They were all withdrawn and scrapped between 1912 and 1915.
