= LCDR B1 class =

Type and origin
- Power type: Steam
- Designer: William Kirtley
- Build date: 1877
- Total produced: 6
Specifications
- Configuration
  - Whyte: 0-6-0
- Gauge: 4 ft 8 1/2 in (1,435 mm)
- Driver dia.: 4 ft 10 in (1.473 m)
- Loco weight: 40.75 long tons (41.4 t)
- Fuel type: Coal
- Boiler pressure: 160 psi (1.10 MPa)
- Cylinders: Two, Stephenson valve gear
- Cylinder size: 17.5 in × 26 in (444 mm × 660 mm)
Performance figures
- Tractive effort: 18,670 lbf (83.0 kN)
Career
- Operators: LCDR · SECR · SR
- Class: B1
- Number in class: 1 January 1923: 2
- Withdrawn: 1912-1924
- Disposition: All scrapped

The LCDR B1 class was a class of 0-6-0 steam locomotives of the London, Chatham and Dover Railway. The class was designed by William Kirtley and introduced in 1877.

== Ownership changes ==
The locomotives passed to the South Eastern and Chatham Railway in 1899. Two (LCDR nos. 612 and 613) survived into Southern Railway ownership in 1923. All had been withdrawn by 1924.
