= LCDR B2 class =

Type and origin
- Power type: Steam
- Designer: William Kirtley
- Build date: 1891
- Total produced: 6
Specifications
- Configuration
  - Whyte: 0-6-0
- Gauge: 4 ft 8 1/2 in (1,435 mm)
- Driver dia.: 5 ft 0 in (1.524 m)
- Loco weight: 39.3 long tons (39.9 t)
- Fuel type: Coal
- Boiler pressure: 160 psi (1.10 MPa)
- Cylinders: Two, Stephenson valve gear
- Cylinder size: 18 in × 26 in (457 mm × 660 mm)
Performance figures
- Tractive effort: 19,095 lbf (84.9 kN)
Career
- Operators: LCDR · SECR · SR
- Class: B2
- Number in class: 1 January 1923: 6
- Withdrawn: 1929-1933
- Disposition: All scrapped

The LCDR B2 class was a class of 0-6-0 steam locomotives of the London, Chatham and Dover Railway. The class was designed by William Kirtley and introduced in 1891.

== Ownership changes ==
The locomotives passed to the South Eastern and Chatham Railway in 1899. All 6 (LCDR Nos. 652–657) passed into Southern Railway ownership in 1923. They were all withdrawn and scrapped by 1933.
