= HMS Arpha =

History
- Name: SS Canterbury (1900–26); SY Arpha (1926–38); SS Arpha (1938–39); HMS Arpha (1939–46); SS Coriano (1946–55)
- Owner: South Eastern and Chatham Railway (1901–22); Southern Railway (1923–26); W E Guinness (1926–38); Crete Shipping Co Ltd (1938); Sark Motorships Ltd (1938–39); Royal Navy (1939–46); W J Brown (1946); Shell Company of Venezuela (1946–47); Caribbean Petroleum Co (1947–49); Shell Caribbean Petroleum Co (1949–51); J M Perez Hernandez (1951–55)
- Operator: South Eastern and Chatham Railway (1901–22); Southern Railway (1923–26); W E Guinness (1926–38); Crete Shipping Co Ltd (1938); Sark Motorships Ltd (1938–39); Royal Navy (1939–46); Worms & Co (1946); Anglo-Saxon Petroleum Co Ltd (1946–47); Caribbean Petroleum Co (1947–49); Shell Caribbean Petroleum Co (1949–51); J M Perez Hernandez (1951–55)
- Port of registry: (United Kingdom) London (1901–26); (United Kingdom) Cowes (1926–38); (United Kingdom) Guernsey (1938–39); (United Kingdom) Guernsey (1939–46); (United Kingdom) London (1946–47); (Venezuela) Maracaibo (1947–55)
- Route: Dover–Calais (1901–26)
- Builder: W Denny, Dumbarton
- Yard number: 640
- Launched: 6 December 1900
- Completed: January 1901
- Out of service: October 1955
- Identification: UK official number 112803 (1900–39); code letters SDVR (1900–34); call sign MFCF (1937–46)
- Fate: Scrapped 1955

General characteristics
- Type: Passenger ferry (1901–26); Steam yacht (1926–38); Passenger ferry (1938–39); Armed boarding vessel (1939–46); Passenger ferry (1946–55)
- Tonnage: 561 GRT (1901–26), 602 (1926–55); 225 NRT (1901–26), 233 (1926–55)
- Length: 195.4 ft (59.6 m)
- Beam: 28.0 ft (8.5 m)
- Depth: 14.2 ft (4.3 m)
- Decks: 1
- Installed power: 2 × triple expansion steam engines
- Propulsion: Twin screws
- Speed: 14 knots (26 km/h)

Arpha was a 602 GRT passenger ferry built in 1900 as Canterbury for the South Eastern and Chatham Railway. She passed to the Southern Railway on 1 January 1923. She was sold to W E Guinness in 1926 and renamed Arpha. In 1938 she was sold to Sark Motorships Ltd, only to be requisitioned by the Royal Navy in 1939. Postwar, she was sold to Compania Shell de Venezuela and renamed Coriano. After a further change of ownership she was scrapped in 1955.

== Description ==
The ship was built by W Denny & Bros, Dumbarton. She was yard number 640 and was launched on 6 December 1900 with completion in January 1901. As built, she had a GRT of 566 and a NRT of 144. She was powered by two triple expansion steam engines, which had cylinders of 13½ inches (34 cm), 20½ inches (52 cm) and 31 inches (79 cm) bore by 21 inches (53 cm) stroke. These could propel her at a speed of 14 knots (26 km/h). Arpha was 195.4 feet (59.6 m) long, with a beam of 28.0 feet (8.5 m) and a depth of 14.2 feet (4.3 m).

== History ==
Canterbury was built for the South Eastern and Chatham Railway. She was used on their Dover - Calais route. Her port of registry was London. In 1926, Canterbury was sold to W E Guinness and was rednamed Arpha. She was converted to a yacht, with a GRT of 602 and a NRT of 233. Her port of registry was changed to Cowes, Isle of Wight. On 6 June 1930, she ran aground in Moon Sound (58°47′N 23°23′E). She was refloated on 10 June. In 1938, Guinness sold her to the Crete Shipping Co Ltd, London, who sold her to Sark Motorships Ltd later that year. Her port of registry was changed to Guernsey.

In 1939, Arpha was requisitioned by the Royal Navy. She was used as an armed boarding vessel in the Mediterranean and Red Sea as part of the Contraband Control Service. For the duration of the war, Arpha was shown on Lloyd's Register as still in the ownership of Sark Motorships Ltd. In 1946, Arpha was sold to W J Brown. She was operated under the management of Worms & Co Ltd. Later that year she was sold to the Shell Co of Venezuela Ltd London, operating under the management of the Anglo-Saxon Petroleum Co Ltd. She was renamed Coriano. In 1947, she was sold to the Caribbean Petroleum Co, Venezuela. Coriano was sold in 1949 to the Shell Caribbean Petroleum Co, Maracaibo. She was used to carry passengers during the construction of a refinery. In 1955, Coriano was sold to J M Perez Hernandez. She was scrapped by North American Smelting Co, Bordentown, New Jersey, arriving for scrapping on 28 October 1955.

== Identification ==
Official numbers were a forerunner to IMO numbers. Canterbury and Arpha had the United Kingdom official number 112803 Canterbury's code letters were SDVR. Arpha's call sign was MFCF.
