= LCDR A class =

LCDR A class LCDR A1 and A2 classes
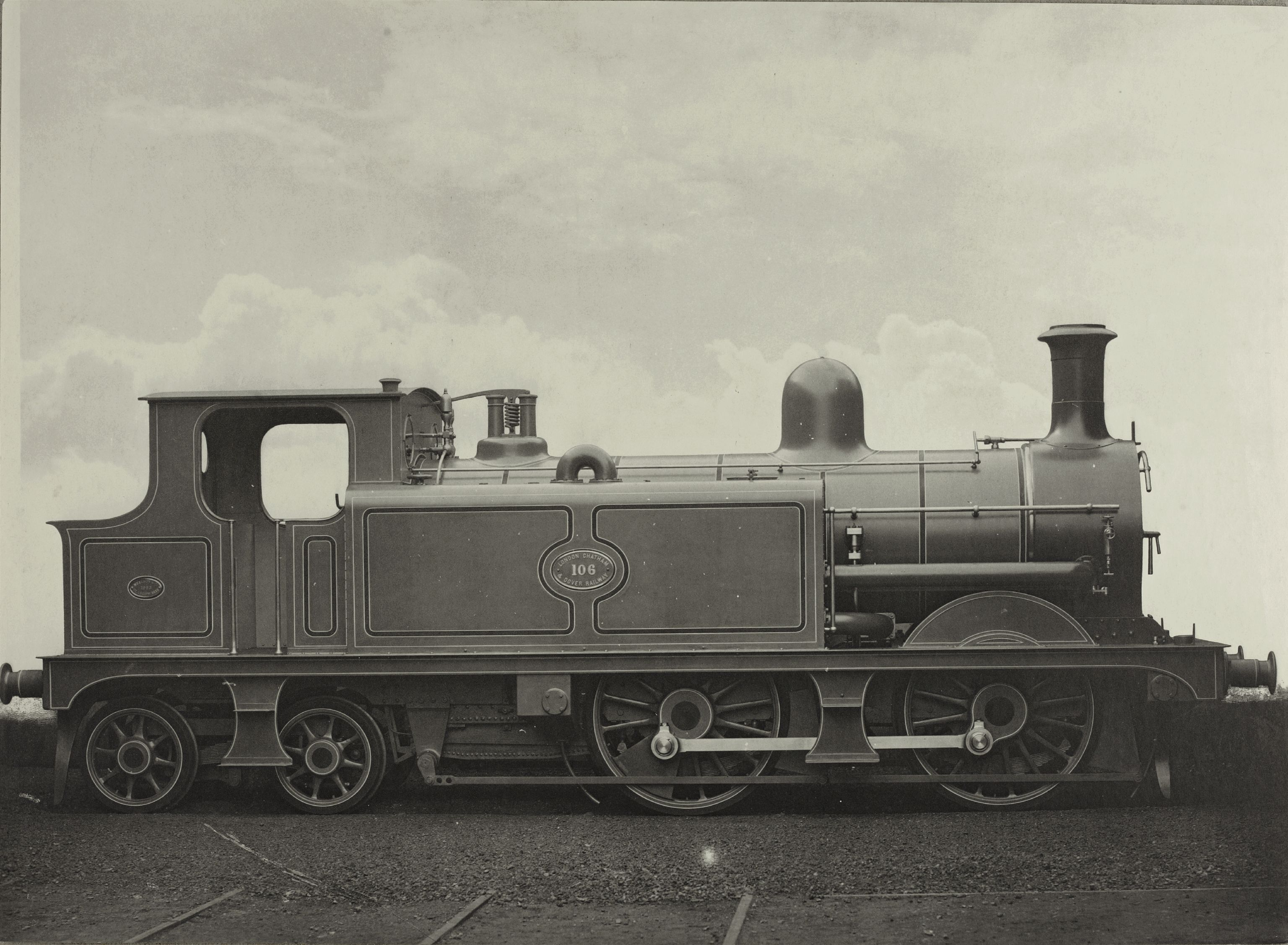
Type and origin
- Power type: Steam
- Designer: William Kirtley
- Build date: 1875–1884
- Total produced: A: 18; A1: 12; A2: 6
Specifications
- Configuration
  - Whyte: 0-4-4T
  - UIC: B2′ n2t
- Gauge: 4 ft 8 1/2 in (1,435 mm)
- Driver dia.: A: 5 ft 3 in (1.600 m); A1/A2: 5 ft 6 in (1.676 m)
- Trailing dia.: 3 ft 0 in (0.914 m)
- Loco weight: 51 long tons (51.8 t)
- Fuel type: Coal
- Fuel capacity: 2 long tons (2.0 t)
- Water cap.: 970 imp gal (4,400 L; 1,160 US gal)
- Firebox
  - Grate area: 16 1/2 sq ft (1.53 m^{2})
- Boiler
  - Tube plates: A: 11 ft 3 in (3,430 mm); A1, A2: 11 ft 0 in (3,350 mm)
  - Small tubes: A: 202 x 1 3/4 in (44 mm); A1: 197 x 1 3/4 in (44 mm); A2: 199 x 1 3/4 in (44 mm)
- Boiler pressure: 150 psi (1.03 MPa)
- Heating surface
  - Firebox: A: 97 1/2 sq ft (9.06 m^{2}); A1: 94 sq ft (8.7 m^{2}); A2: 100 sq ft (9.3 m^{2})
  - Tubes: A: 1,051 sq ft (97.6 m^{2}); A1: 993 sq ft (92.3 m^{2}); A2: 995 sq ft (92.4 m^{2})
  - Total surface: A: 1,148 1/2 sq ft (106.70 m^{2}); A1: 1,087 sq ft (101.0 m^{2}); A2: 1,095 sq ft (101.7 m^{2})
- Cylinders: Two, inside
- Cylinder size: Originally: 17 1/2 in × 26 in (444 mm × 660 mm); Rebuilt: 18 in × 26 in (457 mm × 660 mm)
- Valve gear: Stephenson
Performance figures
- Tractive effort: A: 17,049 lbf (75.8 kN); A1/A2: 16,274 lbf (72.4 kN)
Career
- Operators: LCDR · SECR · SR
- Class: A, A1, A2
- Number in class: 1 January 1923: A, 17; A1, 12; A2, 6
- Withdrawn: 1915–1926
- Disposition: All scrapped

The LCDR A class was a class of 0-4-4T steam locomotives of the London, Chatham and Dover Railway. The class was designed by William Kirtley and introduced in 1875. The A1 and A2 classes were similar, but had larger driving wheels. The differences between the A1 and A2 classes were minor: in particular, the A2 class had a greater heating surface.

== Numbering ==
Table of locomotives
Class	Manufacturer	Serial nos.	Date built	LCDR nos.	SECR nos.	Notes
A	Neilson & Co.	1988–1996	Jul – Oct 1875	101–109	560–568	
A	Vulcan Foundry	750–755	Aug – Nov 1875	110–112, 65–70	569–571, 524–529	No. 570 withdrawn 1915
A1	Kitson & Co.	2300–2311	Feb – May 1880	163–174	622–633	
A2	Robert Stephenson & Co.	2491–2496	Sep 1883 – Feb 1884	75–80	534–539	

== Ownership changes ==
All the A, A1 and A2 class locomotives passed to the South Eastern and Chatham Railway in 1899. Number 570 was withdrawn in 1915 but the remaining locomotives passed to the Southern Railway in 1923. All had been withdrawn by 1926.

Table of withdrawals
Year	Quantity in service at start of year	Quantity withdrawn	Locomotive numbers	Notes
1915	36	1	570	
1923	35	4	A526, A561, A566, A623	
1925	31	14	A524, A525, A527–A529, A560, A564, A569, A535, A537, A538, A622, A624, A628	
1926	17	17	A562, 563, 565, 567, 568, 571, 534, 536, 539, 625–627, 629–633	
