= Longhedge Railway Works =

Former locomotive and carriage works in Battersea

Coordinates: 51°28′21″N 0°8′37″W

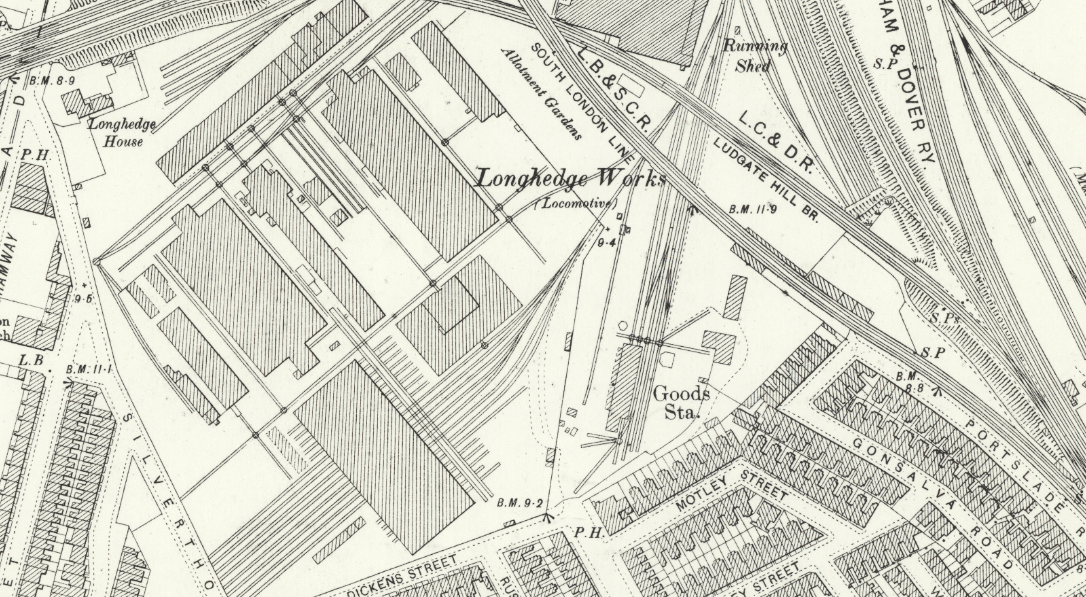
Longhedge works on an old Ordnance Survey map published in 1897

Longhedge Railway Works was a locomotive and carriage works built by the London, Chatham and Dover Railway in the borough of Battersea, South London to serve their new London terminus at Victoria. The facility existed between 1862 until the mid-1950s.

== History ==
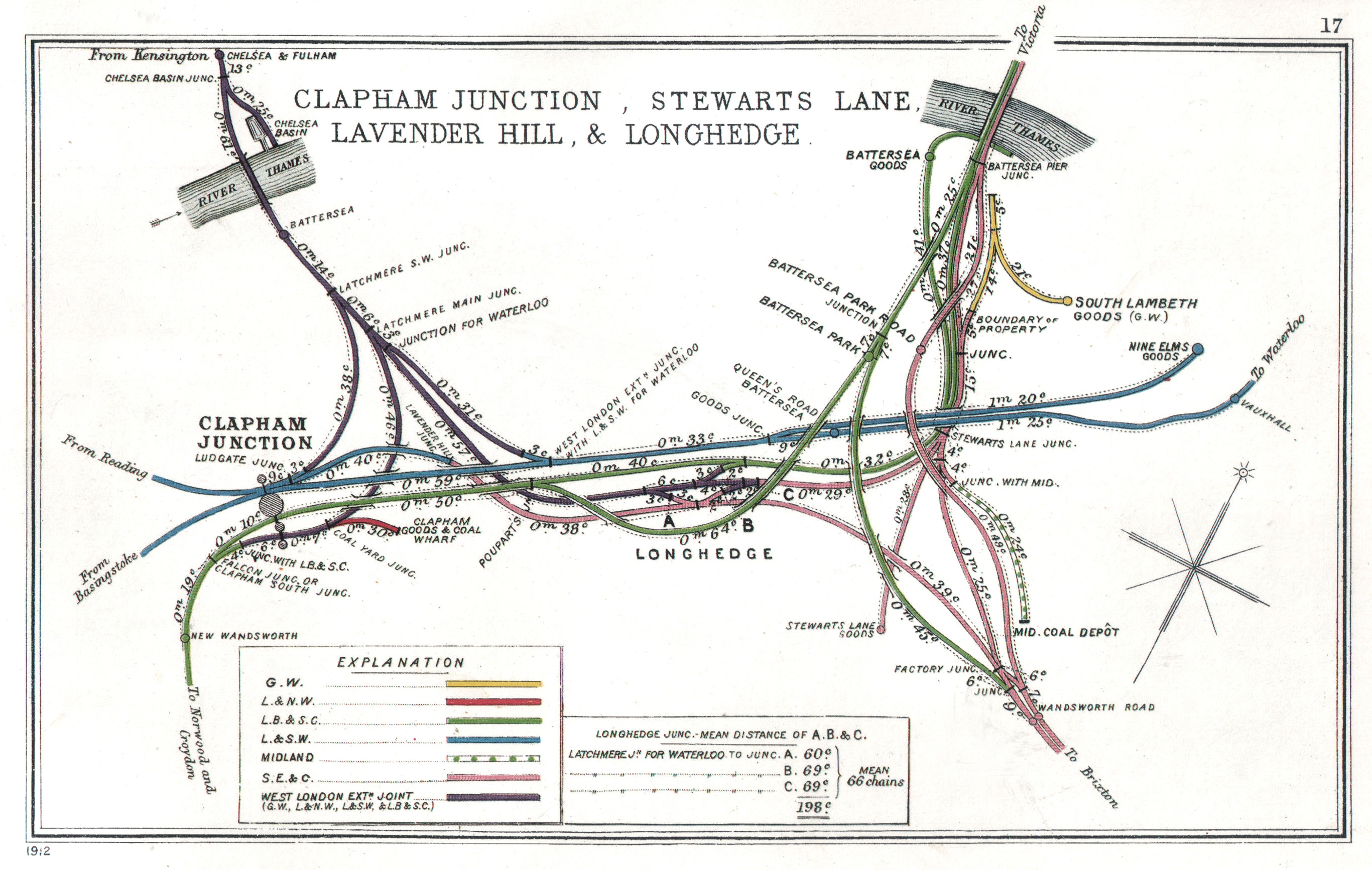
A 1912 Railway Clearing House map of lines around Longhedge

=== Construction ===
In 1860 the directors of the London, Chatham and Dover Railway decided to purchase 75 acres (30 ha) of land, formerly part of the Long Hedge farm in Battersea, to establish their new locomotive works and motive power depot. The site was on the south side of the London and South Western Railway main line at Stewarts Lane. By February 1862 an erecting shop for twelve locomotives, and a running shed for 26 locomotives had been completed, and by the end of the year a carriage works was also completed on the site. Further extensions were made in 1875/6 and 1880/1.

=== Activities ===
The new works was initially used by the locomotive superintendent William Martley for the repair and rebuilding of the existing locomotive stock, with new locomotives obtained from outside contractors. However, in 1869 he began the construction of three new Enigma class 2-4-0 locomotives there. However, it was not until the appointment of William Kirtley as locomotive superintendent in 1876 that the works were again used for new construction with further examples of Martley's Europa class 2-4-0 locomotives, Kirtley's own T class 0-6-0T and his M1, M2 and M3 class 4-4-0 express passenger locomotives. Following Kirtley's retirement in 1898 on the formation of the South Eastern and Chatham Railway, Ashford became the major locomotive works for the new company, but the new Locomotive, Carriage & Wagon Superintendent H. S. Wainwright used Longhedge works for the construction of some examples of his SECR C class 0-6-0 freight locomotives in 1902–04. Fifty locomotives were built at Longhedge between 1869 and 1904.

Locomotives built at Longhedge Works
Designer	Class	Type	Years	Quantity
Martley	Enigma (L)	2-4-0	1869–70	3
Martley	Europa (C)	2-4-0	1876	2
Kirtley	T	0-6-0T	1879–93	10
Kirtley	M1	4-4-0	1880–81	4
Kirtley	M2	4-4-0	1885	2
Kirtley	M3	4-4-0	1892–1901	20
Wainwright	C	0-6-0	1902–04	9

Thereafter the works was used for heavy repairs until 1911, when much of the equipment and machinery was transferred to Ashford, leaving only the capacity to undertake light repairs associated with the adjoining Stewarts Lane motive power depot.

=== The site today ===
After the creation of the Southern Railway in 1923, the nearby Battersea depot of the London, Brighton and South Coast Railway was closed and Stewarts Lane grew to become the largest steam motive power depot of the system. Most of the buildings of Longhedge works were demolished in 1957 to make way for a new depot for servicing electric trains. The site is now occupied by the Stewarts Lane Traction Maintenance Depot.
