= SS Mona (1889) =

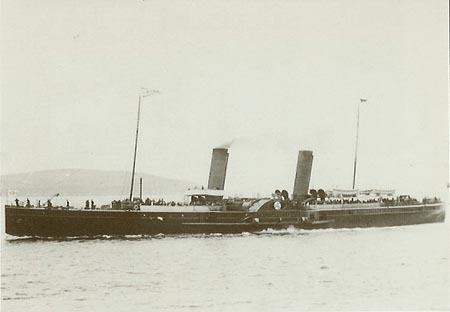
- RMS Mona

History
- Name: Calais-Douvres (1889–1903); RMS Mona (1903–1909)
- Owner: 1889–1899: London, Chatham and Dover Railway Company.; 1899–1903: Liverpool and Douglas Steamers Ltd.; 1903–1909: IOMSPCo
- Operator: 1889–1899: London, Chatham and Dover Railway Company.; 1899–1903: Liverpool and Douglas Steamers Ltd.; 1903–1909: IOMSPCo
- Port of registry: Douglas, Isle of Man
- Builder: Fairfield's & Co., Govan
- Yard number: 340
- Launched: 6 April 1889
- Completed: May 1889
- In service: 1889
- Out of service: 1909
- Identification: Official number: 96575; Code Letters: LJRV
- Fate: Scrapped 1909

General characteristics
- Type: Paddle steamer
- Tonnage: 1,212 GRT
- Length: 342 ft 5 in (104.4 m)
- Beam: 35 ft 9 in (10.9 m)
- Depth: 13 ft 5 in (4.1 m)
- Installed power: 5,400 ihp (4,000 kW)
- Propulsion: Paddlewheels
- Speed: According to Steam Packet documents 18 knots (33 km/h; 21 mph)
- Capacity: 1,212 passengers
- Crew: 59

SS (RMS) Mona (III), the third ship of the Isle of Man Steam Packet Company to bear the name, was a steel paddle steamer. The vessel was originally owned and operated by the London, Chatham and Dover Railway Company, but sold her to the Liverpool and Douglas Steamship Company. The vessel was acquired from that company's liquidators by the Isle of Man Steam Packet Company in 1903.

== Construction and dimensions ==
Constructed in the yards of Faifields of Govan in 1889 she was originally named Calais-Douvres. The vessel measured 324 feet 5 inches (98.88 m) long, with a beam of 35 feet 9 inches (10.90 m) and a depth of 13 feet 5 inches (4.09 m). She was certified to carry 1,212 passengers, and had a crew complement of 59.

Her engines produced 5,400 indicated horsepower (4,000 kW), but the vessel's speed is open to question. No speed is entered in the Register of Shipping, but her best run during her sea trials averaged 18.86 knots (34.93 km/h; 21.70 mph). The Steam Packet give it as 18 knots (33 km/h; 21 mph), but she is said to have steamed from Dover to Calais in three minutes under the hour at an average speed of 22.6 knots (41.9 km/h; 26.0 mph).

== Service life ==
Calais-Douvres was launched on 6 April 1889. On completion, Calais-Douvres entered service with the London, Chatham and Dover Railway Company, plying the English Channel between Calais and Dover – the two ports after which she was named. During her channel service she was the vessel on which Queen Victoria made her last trip to the continent of Europe.

From the London, Chatham and Dover Railway Company, she was acquired by Higginbottom's Liverpool and Douglas Steamers Ltd, and entered service on the Irish Sea in competition with the Isle of Man Steam Packet Company in 1901.

Upon the death of Mr Higginbottom in December 1902, the Liverpool and Douglas Steamship Company ceased to exist, and the vessel was then bought from the liquidators by the Isle of Man Steam Packet Company in July 1903. The consideration was £6,000; and upon her purchase she was renamed Mona.

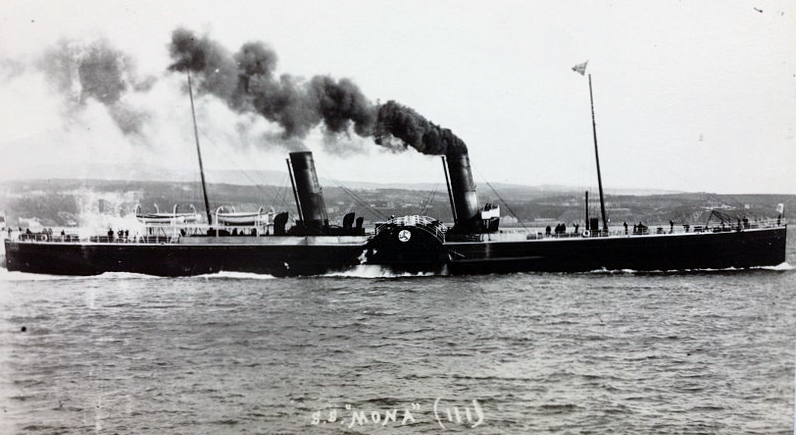
Mona leaving Douglas

Mona entered service for the Steam Packet Company on 23 July 1903, when under the command of Captain Hill she sailed from Liverpool to Douglas making passage in 3hrs 45mins. She then made passage to Ramsey taking a sailing back to Liverpool. She also transported members of the Herefordshire Volunteers from Ramsey to Birkenhead on 9 August.

On 16 June 1904, a passenger on board Mona died whilst she was en route from Liverpool to Douglas. The passenger was a surveyor and employed by Prescott District Council. An inquest was held at Douglas the following day, before the High Bailiff. Testimony revealed that the passenger had departed in good health, but became unwell and died of heart failure.

=== Disposal ===
Mona was the last paddle steamer bought for the Steam Packet fleet. After six years of service with the line, Mona was sold for scrap in 1909.

== Official number and code letters ==
Official numbers are issued by individual flag states. They should not be confused with IMO ship identification numbers. Nona had the UK Official Number 96575 and originally used the Code Letters L J R V.

== Bibliography ==
- Chappell, Connery (1980). Island Lifeline T. Stephenson & Sons Ltd ISBN 0-901314-20-X
