= William Kirtley (railway engineer) =

English railway engineer (1840–1919)

William Kirtley (1840 – 7 October 1919) was an English railway engineer, and was the Locomotive Superintendent of the London Chatham and Dover Railway (LCDR) in England from 1874 until the merger to form the South Eastern and Chatham Railway at the end of 1898.

== Biography ==
William was born in Warrington in 1840, the son of the locomotive engineer Thomas Kirtley (1810–1847). He was educated by his uncle Matthew Kirtley, Locomotive Superintendent of the Birmingham and Derby Junction Railway and later of the Midland Railway, following his father's premature death. He served as a pupil at Derby Works from 1854–1860, and from 1861 to 1864 he was Running foreman for the Midland Railway for the London District. In 1864 he was appointed superintendent of Derby Works. In 1874 he was appointed Carriage and Wagon Superintendent on the LCDR following the death of William Martley, and served until the merger to form the South Eastern and Chatham Railway at the end of 1898, when he retired. He also served as consultant to the Hull and Barnsley Railway between 1883 and 1885, prior to the opening of the line.

== London Chatham & Dover Railway Career ==
During his period at the LCDR Kirtley extended Longhedge Railway Works (Battersea) and once again used it for new locomotive construction. He also introduced a new livery, numbering scheme and locomotive classification scheme to the railway. The railway under Kirtley was also one of the pioneers in using continuous braking by means of Westinghouse air brakes.

=== Locomotives ===
According to D.L. Bradley, Kirtley's locomotives were "well designed, robustly constructed, easily maintained, and capable of high mileages between general repairs. For the period their coal, water and old consumption was moderate while all performed their daily tasks well." His classes included 0-4-4 suburban tanks of the A, A1, A2, R, and R1 classes; Six coupled goods classes B, B1, and B2 classes; six coupled tanks of the T class; and 4-4-0 express passenger locomotives of the M, M1, M2 and M3 classes.

Whilst working as a consultant for the Hull and Barnsley Railway he also designed twelve six coupled tank locomotives and twenty tender locomotives to similar designs and ten 2-4-0s.

Business positions
Preceded by William Martley	Carriage and Wagon Superintendent of The London Chatham and Dover Railway; 1874–1898	Post abolished Company merged into South Eastern and Chatham Railway
