= William Martley =

William Martley (4 January 1824 – 6 February 1874) was the locomotive superintendent of the London, Chatham and Dover Railway (LCDR) in England from 1860 until his death.

== Biography ==
William was born in Ballyfallon, in County Meath, Ireland, in 1824. In 1841 he was articled to Daniel Gooch at the Swindon Works of the Great Western Railway, and in 1847 became locomotive superintendent of the Waterford, Limerick and Western Railway. He soon moved to the South Devon Railway, and then, in 1850, became locomotive superintendent of the South Wales Railway, based at Newport. In 1860 he moved to the London Chatham and Dover Railway, where he was the first locomotive superintendent. He became a member of the Institution of Civil Engineers in 1867, but died in office in February 1874.

== London Chatham & Dover Railway ==
During his period at the LCDR Martley established the Longhedge Railway Works 1860–1862 and used it for the construction of new locomotives, and the Stewarts Lane motive power depot.

=== Locomotives ===
According to D.L. Bradley, Martley's locomotives were "neat and attractive with a special charm of their own. In service they proved hard-working, reliable and above all, durable." His classes included 0-4-2T and 2-4-0T tank engines and 2-4-0 tender locomotives.

Business positions
New title	Locomotive superintendent of The London, Chatham and Dover Railway; 1860–1874	Succeeded by William Kirtley
