= London, Chatham and Dover Railway =

British pre-grouping railway company (1859–1899/1922)

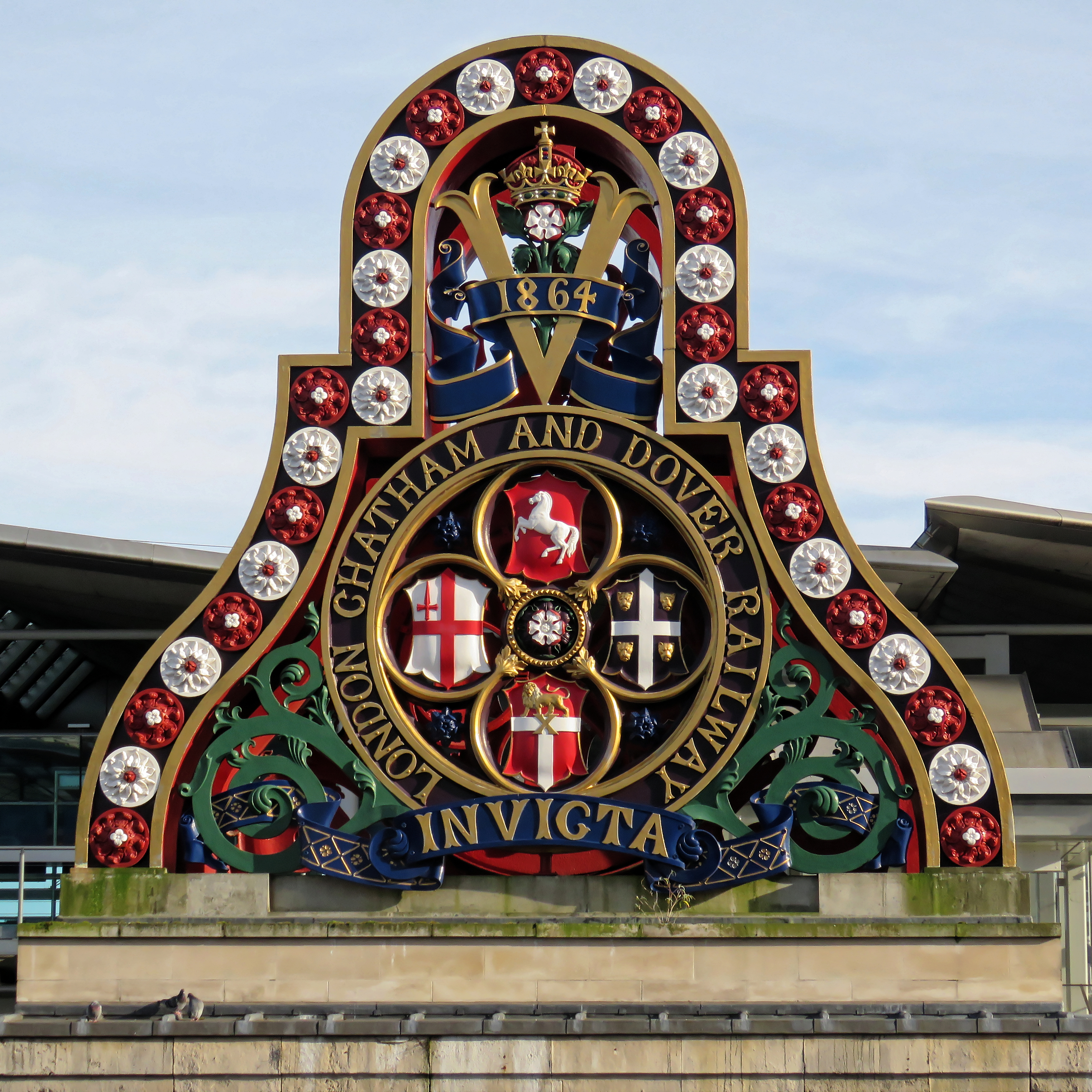
Badge of the LCDR on the first Blackfriars Railway Bridge

The London, Chatham and Dover Railway (LCDR or LC&DR) was a railway company in south-eastern England. It was created on 1 August 1859, when the East Kent Railway was given approval in the London, Chatham and Dover Railway Act 1859 (22 & 23 Vict. c. liv) to change its name. Its lines ran through London, and northern and eastern Kent, to form a significant part of the Greater London commuter network. The company existed until 31 December 1922, when its assets were merged with those of other companies to form the Southern Railway as a result of the grouping determined by the Railways Act 1921.

The LCDR was always in a difficult financial situation and went bankrupt in 1867, although it was able to continue to operate. Many of the difficulties were caused by the intense competition and duplication of services with the South Eastern Railway (SER). In 1898, the LCDR agreed with the SER to share the operation of the two railways, working them as a single system, known as the South Eastern and Chatham Railway, and pooling receipts, but it was not a full amalgamation. The SER and LCDR remained separate companies, with separate shareholders, until both became constituents of the Southern Railway on 1 January 1923.

"The Chatham", as it was sometimes known, was often criticised for its lamentable carriage stock and poor punctuality, something which Somerset Maugham refers to in the novel Mrs Craddock: "Suddenly she thought of going away there and then... But there were no trains: the London, Chatham, and Dover Railway has perhaps saved many an elopement". However, in two respects the LCDR was very enterprising: it used the highly effective Westinghouse air brake on its passenger stock, and the Sykes "Lock and Block" system of signalling. As a result, it had an excellent safety record.

== History ==
=== East Kent Railway ===
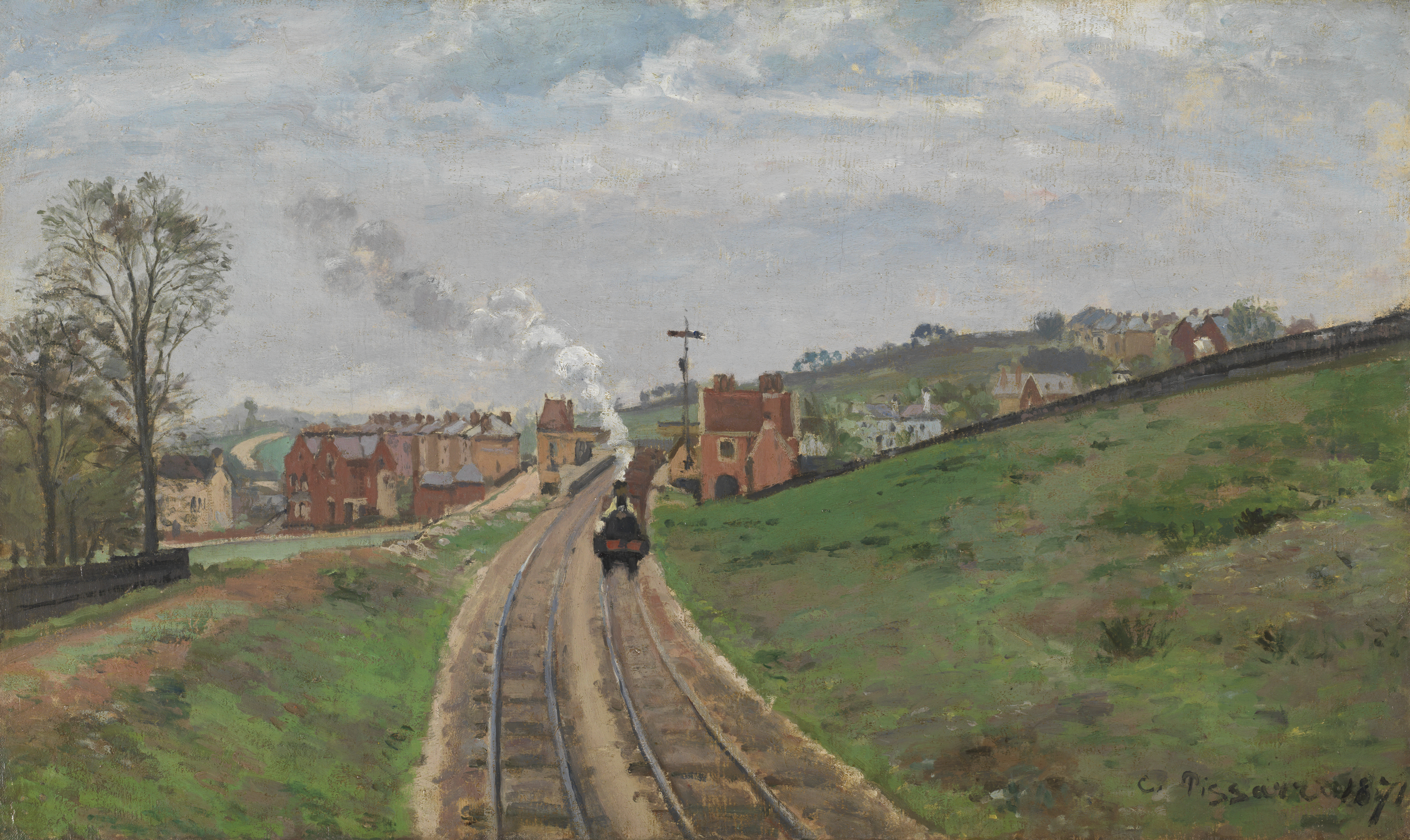
Lordship Lane Station, an intermediate station on the Crystal Palace and South London Junction Railway, a LCDR branch line in London, by Camille Pissarro (1871)

The LCDR originated through the dissatisfaction felt by the inhabitants and businesses of towns in north and east Kent with the services provided by the SER, resulting in the formation of the East Kent Railway (EKR). Permission to build a new line from Strood near Rochester to Faversham was granted by Parliament in the East Kent Railway Act 1853 (16 & 17 Vict. c. cxxxii), but the SER successfully fought off an attempt by the new company to secure running powers on its tracks. In return, the SER agreed not to oppose any future application for an extension of the line to Dover, which was granted in 1855.

It took the EKR several years to raise the necessary finance and it was not until 25 January 1858 that the first section of the line from Chatham to Faversham was opened, with stations at Rainham, Sittingbourne, Teynham, and Faversham. On 29 March 1858, a second section opened, from Strood to Chatham. Around July 1858, a station opened at New Brompton (renamed New Brompton (Gillingham) in May 1886 and Gillingham from 1 October 1912). Rochester station opened after the rival SER opened Chatham Central station.

On 3 March 1858, the West End of London and Crystal Palace Railway (WELCPR) opened the extension of its line from Norwood (Crystal Palace) to Beckenham Junction (opened as Beckenham) and Shortlands (opened as Bromley).

On 22 November 1858, the Mid-Kent Railway constructed a line from New Beckenham to Beckenham Junction station and obtained running rights over the WELCPR to Bromley (Shortlands). From there the Crays Company was building a line on to Bromley South (opened as Bromley Common) and Bickley (opened as Southborough Road). The Mid Kent line connected with the WELCPR that later provided the essential access to London. After absorbing the Crays Company and gaining running rights over the Mid Kent metals to Beckenham Junction, the LCDR later bought the track between Beckenham Junction, Birkbeck and Bromley Junction, while the LBSCR absorbed the rest of the WELCPR.

London, Chatham and Dover Railway Act 1859
- Act of Parliament
- Parliament of the United Kingdom
- Long title: An Act to change the Name of the East Kent Railway Company, and for other Purposes connected with their Undertaking.
- Citation: 22 & 23 Vict. c. liv

Dates
- Royal assent: 1 August 1859

By the London, Chatham and Dover Railway Act 1859 (22 & 23 Vict. c. liv), the EKR changed its name to the LCDR, although Dover had not then been reached, coinciding with the Western Extension via Longfield to join the Crays Company rails at Southborough Road (now Bickley).

=== London, Chatham and Dover Railway ===
Railway lines in Kent. LCDR lines can be seen alongside SER and other railway companies lines.

- 1860 openings:
  - 9 July 1860: Faversham – Canterbury (now the East station) – Whitstable (old station)
  - 19 July 1860: Sittingbourne and Sheerness Railway, which became part of LCDR from 1866), including Queenborough. Sheerness-on-Sea railway station dates from 1883: the original terminus became the freight depot. There are branch lines to Queenborough Pier and Sheerness Dockyard. See Sheerness Line.
  - 3 December 1860: opening of line between Bickley and Rochester, connecting the two parts of the network; opening of St Mary Cray, Farningham Road and Rochester Bridge stations (the latter being closed in 1917)
- 1861 openings:
  - Meopham and Sole Street stations.
  - 22 July 1861: extension from Canterbury East to Dover, with Bekesbourne, Adisham, Shepherd's Well and Dover Priory stations opening with the line.
  - 31 July 1861: Whitstable to Herne Bay.
  - 1 November 1861: Route to Victoria station opened: LCDR first access to London.

London, Chatham, and Dover Railway (Sevenoaks Railway Purchase) Act 1879
- Act of Parliament
- Parliament of the United Kingdom
- Long title: An Act for authorising the Sale and Transfer of the Undertaking of the Sevenoaks, Maidstone, and Tunbridge Railway Company to the London, Chatham, and Dover Railway Company; and for other purposes.
- Citation: 42 & 43 Vict. c. clxxiii

Dates
- Royal assent: 21 July 1879

Text of statute as originally enacted

- 1862 openings:
  - 2 June 1862: the Sevenoaks Railway opened from Sevenoaks Junction (later resited further west and called Swanley Junction, now Swanley station) to Sevenoaks. Worked by LCDR, with stations at Eynsford, Shoreham, Otford, and Sevenoaks Bat & Ball. See Maidstone East Line
  - 1 July 1862: Swanley station (then named Sevenoaks Junction)
  - 6 October 1862: stations along the Metropolitan Extension line towards Victoria opened: including Penge East, Sydenham Hill, Herne Hill, and Clapham. Knight's Hill, now West Dulwich was also opened.
- 1863 openings:
  - Wandsworth Road station
  - 5 October 1863: Herne Bay to Ramsgate. Birchington-on-Sea, Margate, and Broadstairs stations all opening with the line.
  - 6 October 1863: City Branch – Diverges from the Metropolitan Extension of the Chatham main line at Herne Hill. Opened as far as Elephant & Castle.
- 1864 openings:
  - 1 June 1864: City Branch extended to Blackfriars Bridge
- 1865 openings:
  - 1 June 1865: City Branch extended to Ludgate Hill
  - 1 August 1865: Crystal Palace and South London Junction Railway – Diverges from the LCDR mainline at Brixton to Crystal Palace High Level via Nunhead
- 1866 openings:
  - 1 January 1866: Snow Hill tunnel connecting the City Branch with the Metropolitan Railway
- 1872 openings:
  - Longfield opened as Fawkham for Longfield and Hartley
  - Loughborough Road (the first station at what is now Loughborough Junction station)
  - City Branch extended to Holborn Viaduct
- 1 June 1874: Otford to Maidstone East line, with Kemsing, Borough Green, West Malling, Barming and Maidstone East stations opening with the line. See Maidstone East Line.
- 1886: Gravesend Railway branch line to Gravesend (Gravesend West) was constructed from the Chatham Main Line at Fawkham Junction (just before Longfield station).
- 15 June 1881: Dover Priory to Deal, Dover and Deal Railway (LCDR/South Eastern Railway). See Kent Coast Line.
- 1 July 1884: Maidstone East to Ashford West with intermediate stations opening at Bearsted, Hollingbourne, Harrietsham, Lenham, and Charing. See Maidstone East Line
- 1 October 1884: Kent House, west of Beckenham Junction
- 1 July 1892: Catford Loop Line – The Shortlands and Nunhead Railway (constructed 1889) was incorporated with the Crystal Palace and South London Junction Railway to form a loop, effectively quadrupling the LCDR main line. This date also saw the bay platforms at Kent House opening.

Authorised from the future site of Nunhead on 28 July 1863; Nunhead opened 1 September 1871; Greenwich Park branch opened from Nunhead to Blackheath Hill on 18 September 1871; opened through to Greenwich Park on 1 October 1888.

- Greenwich Park branch – Nunhead to Greenwich Park, closed by Southern on 1 January 1926, although a section was kept in use, and is used to this day as a link between Nunhead and Lewisham

Stations on the Greenwich Branch were

- Brockley Lane (opened 1872: shut to passengers 1917: closed 1970)
- Lewisham Road (opened 1871: closed 1917)
- Blackheath Hill (opened 1871: closed 1917)
- Greenwich Park (opened 1888: closed 1917)

== Insolvency ==
=== Background ===
Parliament had established standard clauses that were included in the authorising acts of Parliament for all railway companies that specifically limited the borrowing powers of the company to one-third of its authorised share capital to ensure there was a proper balance between share capital and loans. These standard clauses also required that before any loans could be taken, all of the share capital must have been subscribed for, at least 50% paid for and the payment proved to the satisfaction of a justice of the peace.

The railway construction partnership Peto and Betts had done a lot of work already for the LCDR, some of it via a close but separate partnership between Sir Morton Peto, Edward Betts, and Thomas Russell Crampton, the engineer for the LCDR. This new partnership, Peto, Betts and Crampton, in conjunction with the original partnership, Peto and Betts, agreed to build a line between London Bridge and Victoria for the LCDR and to be paid entirely in the company's shares and debentures.

=== Immediate cause of the insolvency ===
From its inception, the LCDR was known to be under capitalized. With the collapse of the bank Overend, Gurney and Company in May 1866, it became apparent that the LCDR had been funding its construction by operating a series of schemes to evade the loan restriction requirements and borrow money that was not secured in the way the law required.

Shares had been issued in the names of Peto, Betts, Crampton and their acquaintances, and the LCDR accounts written up to make it look as though either the associated cash payment had been made directly to Peto and Betts to fund the construction of the line, or the money, having been paid to the railway company, had temporarily been lent back to the new shareholders. In fact, no cash had changed hands at all, but on the strength of these fictitious entries, the statutory declaration was made before a justice of the peace and authority given to raise loans.

Once these major irregularities were exposed, the financial markets refused to continue lending to the LCDR and it became insolvent.

=== Samuel Morton Peto ===
In December 1863 Samuel Morton Peto, a partner in Peto and Betts, had joined the board of the LCDR as financial advisor. With the collapse of the company the accusation was made that Peto was party to the scheme to circumvent the loan restrictions.

At the time of the LCDR insolvency Peto was the Liberal Member of Parliament for Bristol, and on 22 October 1866 addressed a meeting in Bristol to explain his involvement with the LCDR. Although reports of the meeting are very complimentary and sympathetic to Peto, further contemporary analysis was less so.

At the Bristol meeting, Peto was quite open with his admission that his business, Peto and Betts, was party to a scheme where they would give the LCDR a receipt for money paid to them as contractors, and the LCDR gave Peto and Betts a counter-receipt for money paid "for deposit, and in anticipation of calls." It was made to appear that share capital had been paid which had not been paid. On the strength of these fictitious receipts, again, the statutory declaration was made before a justice of the peace and authority given to raise loans.

However, Peto did not consider himself in any way to be at any fault. In his view, as it was the LCDR company solicitors that had suggested this course of action, and had drawn up the fraudulent statutory declaration and the loan documentation papers, he did not think that he should shoulder any of the blame. When they heard how Peto had implicated them, the company solicitors retorted that they had never done anything of the kind, and that they regarded any attempt to borrow money, except on the basis of "a bona fide subscription and a bona fide payment of half the capital," as "utterly indefensible."

Peto's attitudes were not unique. One of his supporters (and himself a railway director and deputy chairman) made a statement to the meeting to the effect that railway boards of directors cannot afford to be too nice, "It is very difficult to make a railway out of nothing … Parliamentary requirements almost necessitate the doing of things which are not strictly right and proper."

=== Financial market reaction ===
Financial commentators were scandalised. Typical of the comments published were:

Of course, we may expect to hear more about this part of the question; but even supposing Sir Morton Peto's apology to be true in point of fact, what a pitiful apology it is! He, an experienced man of business, and the regular financial adviser to the company, disclaims all responsibility for unjustifiable financial actions, if only the company's solicitors tell hint that it is all right. Surely it is not a legal question, but a moral question, whether it is permissible to concoct fictitious documents for the purpose of evading the provisions of an Act of Parliament.

Whom shall we in future trust? Here is Sir Morton Peto, saying expressly, ‘These debentures are not debentures; I do not know what they are, but debentures they are not. I got money on them, it is true, but they are not worth anything. They are only quasi things, and the good debentures are elsewhere.’ We have never seen the whole basis of railway credit so rudely shaken. We could not have believed that such a defence could have been offered. How is Lombard-street ever to rely on having good debentures, when it finds men of the greatest repute and the highest standing offering it documents so very like debentures, but after all not real? ... Of course the company was primarily responsible; but Sir Morton Peto was acting as their trusted financial agent, ... and therefore he must be held responsible, not of course exclusively, but conjointly with those with whom he acted."

=== Aftermath ===
The LCDR was refinanced. The original shareholders lost their investment and the board of directors and company solicitors replaced. The new board resolved to pursue Peto, Betts and Crampton and made a "staggering" claim against them personally for £6,661,941 19s 1d. (equivalent to £685,610,000 as of 2025).

Peto, Betts and Crampton admitted to owing the LCDR £365,000 and eventually the railway acquiesced to this figure. The railway's new solicitors declared, "Whether my clients had a proof upon the proceedings for £360,000 or for £6,600,000, the result would, unfortunately be the same – in neither case would there be any dividend." The Pall Mall Gazette commented, "… the chase was costly and the game worthless."

The personal reputations of Peto and Betts were destroyed and never recovered. Although also made personally bankrupt, Crampton came out of the episode with his reputation intact and continued in business.

== Formation of the South Eastern and Chatham Railway ==
On 1 January 1899, the South Eastern and Chatham Railways Joint Management Committee was formed to oversee joint working. On 5 August 1899, the South Eastern and London, Chatham and Dover Railways Act 1899 (62 & 63 Vict. c. clxviii) was passed, which resulted in the formation of the South Eastern and Chatham Railway (SE&CR). This was not a true merger since each company kept its individual board of directors within the organisation.

The rolling stock and steamboats of the two companies were thereafter worked as one concern. Some rationalisation of competing stations occurred but it was not fully resolved. Between 1902 and 1904, connections were built to allow LCDR trains through running on ex-SER lines, notably in the Bickley area where the two main lines crossed. The rationalisation of the lines in Thanet to create a line which ran through from Margate via Ramsgate to Minster did not take place until after the grouping. In 1936 the former tunnel to Ramsgate Harbour became part of the Tunnel Railway underground railway system linking Ramsgate beach to Hereson Road, near Dumpton Park mainline station.

In 1923, the LCDR and the South Eastern Railway (SER), the London, Brighton and South Coast Railway (LBSCR), and the London and South Western Railway (LSWR) were joined to form the Southern Railway.

== Line details ==
Principal engineering works

- Blackfriars Bridge: 933 ft (284 m) long
- Grosvenor Bridge: 930 ft (283 m)
- Viaduct carrying extension to Blackfriars: 742 brick arches, 94 girder bridges

Steepest gradient

- Rochester Bridge — Sole Street: 5 miles (8.0 km) at 1:100 (1%)

Tunnels

- Lydden, or Shepherd's Well Tunnel: 2,376 yd (2,173 m)
- Penge Tunnel, adjacent to Sydenham Hill: 2,141 yd (1,958 m) – this was allegedly Queen Victoria's least favourite tunnel

Locomotive Works

- The locomotive works were at Longhedge, in Battersea, and the old erecting shop can still be seen. The former SER works at Ashford took over locomotive building for the joint concern, but some building work at Longhedge continued in use for a few years. The London, Chatham and Dover Railway Tavern, in nearby Cabul Road, is widely regarded as having the longest traditional pub name in Britain.

== Rolling stock ==
Both the South Eastern and London, Chatham and Dover Railway companies' locomotives were painted black each with their own style of lining but, when taken over by the South Eastern and Chatham Railways Managing Committee (SE&CR), dark green was adopted with an elaborate lining scheme. After some trials with a hybrid colour scheme (SER maroon on the upper parts and LC&DR teak on the lower), the SE&CR adopted the dark maroon/lake livery for passenger stock. Ex-LC&DR locomotives were renumbered by adding 459 to the running numbers (i.e. locomotive No 1 became No 460, etc.); SER locomotives retained their existing numbers.

For a small and indigent company the Chatham was lucky in its locomotive engineers. After a very patchy start, with a miscellany of Cramptons and other oddities, it had two very competent engineers.

William Martley was appointed in 1860, and commissioned some very effective performers, notably the 0-4-2 well tanks of the 'Scotchmen' (1866) and 'Large Scotchmen' (1873) classes for the suburban services; and the 'Europa' class (1873) of 2-4-0s, which ran the mail trains to and from Dover, the Chatham's crack service.

William Kirtley came from the Midland Railway in 1874, following the death of Martley. He was the nephew of Matthew Kirtley, the Midland's famous locomotive superintendent. Kirtley produced a series of excellent designs, robust and good performers — the A series of 0-4-4 tanks for suburban services, the B series of 0-6-0 goods engines; the T class of shunting engines; the M series of 4-4-0 express passenger engines; and a final R series of enlarged 0-4-4 tanks.

These rather than Stirling's Ashford products formed the basis for SE&CR development under Wainwright, not least because it was Robert Surtees from Longhedge who led design work for the successor organisation. The R series led to the SE&CR's R1 and subsequent H class; the Bs to the famous C class; and the Ms to the D and E classes, which in their rebuilt Maunsell form may have been the best British inside-cylinder 4-4-0s.

== Ships ==
The London, Chatham and Dover Railway operated a number of steamships from 1864, when they took over Jenkins & Churchward's fleet.

Ship	Launched	Tonnage (GRT)	Notes
Bessemer	1875	1,886	Owned by the Bessemer Steamship Co Ltd. Operated by LCDR for a period in 1875 then returned to her owners.
Breeze	1863	385	Scrapped in 1899.
Calais	1896	979	Sold in 1911 to Hater, Boulogne, renamed Au Revoir.
Calais-Douvres	1878	1,924	Acquired in 1878 from English Channel Steamship Co Ltd. Previously named Express. Sold in 1891.
Calais-Douvres	1889	1,212	Sold in 1900 to Liverpool & Douglas Steamers.
Castalia	1874	1,533	Acquired in 1878 from English Channel Steamship Co Ltd. Sold in 1883 to Metropolitan Asylums Board for use as a hospital ship.
Dover	1896	979	Scrapped in 1911.
Empress	1854	196	Acquired in 1864, scrapped in 1878.
Empress	1887	1,213	Scrapped in 1906
Etoile du Nord	1862	503	Renamed Petrel in 1880. Scrapped in 1899.
Foam	1862	495	Scrapped in 1901.
France	1864	365	Scrapped in 1899.
Invicta	1882	1,282	Scrapped in 1899.
John Penn	1860	220	Sold in 1863 to Belgian State Railways, renamed Perle.
Lord Warden	1896	979	Scrapped in 1911.
Maid of Kent	1861	364	Acquired in 1864, scrapped in 1898.
Pioneer	1854	196	Acquired in 1864, previously named Queen. Sold in 1878 to Potter, London.
Prince	1864	338	Renamed Prince Imperial in 1891. Scrapped in 1899.
Prince Frederick William	1857	219	Acquired in 1864, sold in 1874 to Potter, Liverpool.
Samphire	1861	336	Scrapped in 1899.
Scud	1862	495	Acquired in 1864, sold c1867.
Victoria	1886	1,042	Scrapped in 1904
Wave	1863	385	Acquired in 1864, scrapped in 1899

== See also ==
- Edward Chapman
