= South Eastern and Chatham Railway =

British railway union

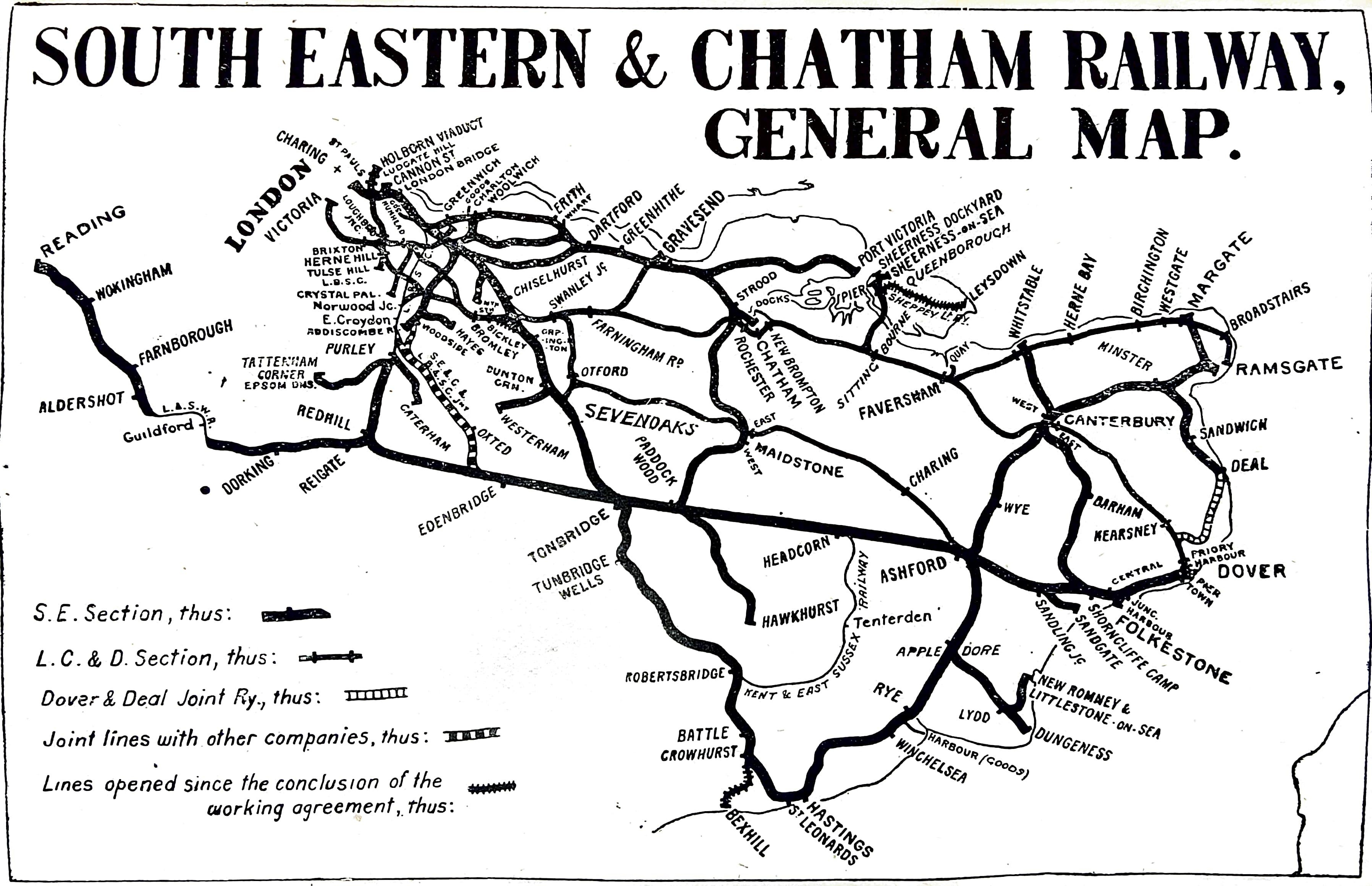
- 1920 map of the railway

Technical
- Track gauge: 4 ft 8 1/2 in (1,435 mm)
- Length: 637 miles 61 chains (1,026.4 km) (1919)
- Track length: 1,302 miles 24 chains (2,095.8 km) (1919)

The South Eastern and Chatham Railway Companies Joint Management Committee (SE&CRCJMC), known as the South Eastern and Chatham Railway (SE&CR), was a working union of two neighbouring rival railways, the South Eastern Railway (SER) and London, Chatham and Dover Railway (LC&DR), which operated between London and south-east England. Between 1899 and 1923, the SE&CR had a monopoly of railway services in Kent and to the main Channel ports for ferries to France and Belgium.

The companies had competed extensively, with some of the bitterest conflicts between British railway companies. Competing routes to the same destinations were built, so several towns in Kent had been served with a similar frequency service by both companies. In places, unfettered competition allowed two stations and services to multiple London termini.

It would be a constituent of the Southern Railway as part of the 1923 Grouping.

Railway lines in Kent, showing most of the SE&CR network

== Formation ==
By the end of the 19th century, the SER and LC&DR had fought over a small and not particularly lucrative territory for 40 years. Both were notorious for the poor punctuality of their services and the decrepitude of their rolling stock, and the struggles had driven both companies to the verge of bankruptcy. It became inevitable that they must combine or succumb.

The SE&CR was formed on 1 January 1899, when the SER and LC&DR formed a "management committee" comprising the directors of both companies. This merged the two companies' operations, although they remained legally separate, with receipts split 59% to SER and 41% LC&DR until the Grouping, to avoid the costs and risks of a formal merger.

South Eastern and London, Chatham and Dover Railways Act 1899
- Act of Parliament
- Parliament of the United Kingdom
- Long title: An Act to provide for the working union of the South Eastern and London Chatham and Dover Railway Companies and for other purposes.
- Citation: 62 & 63 Vict. c. clxviii

Dates
- Royal assent: 1 August 1899

On 5 August 1899 the South Eastern and London, Chatham and Dover Railways Act 1899 (62 & 63 Vict. c. clxviii) was passed.

== Integration ==
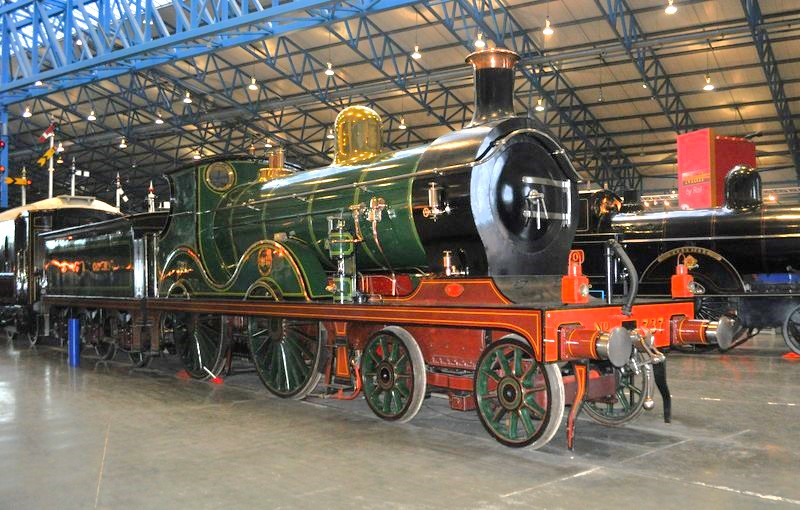
SECR D class

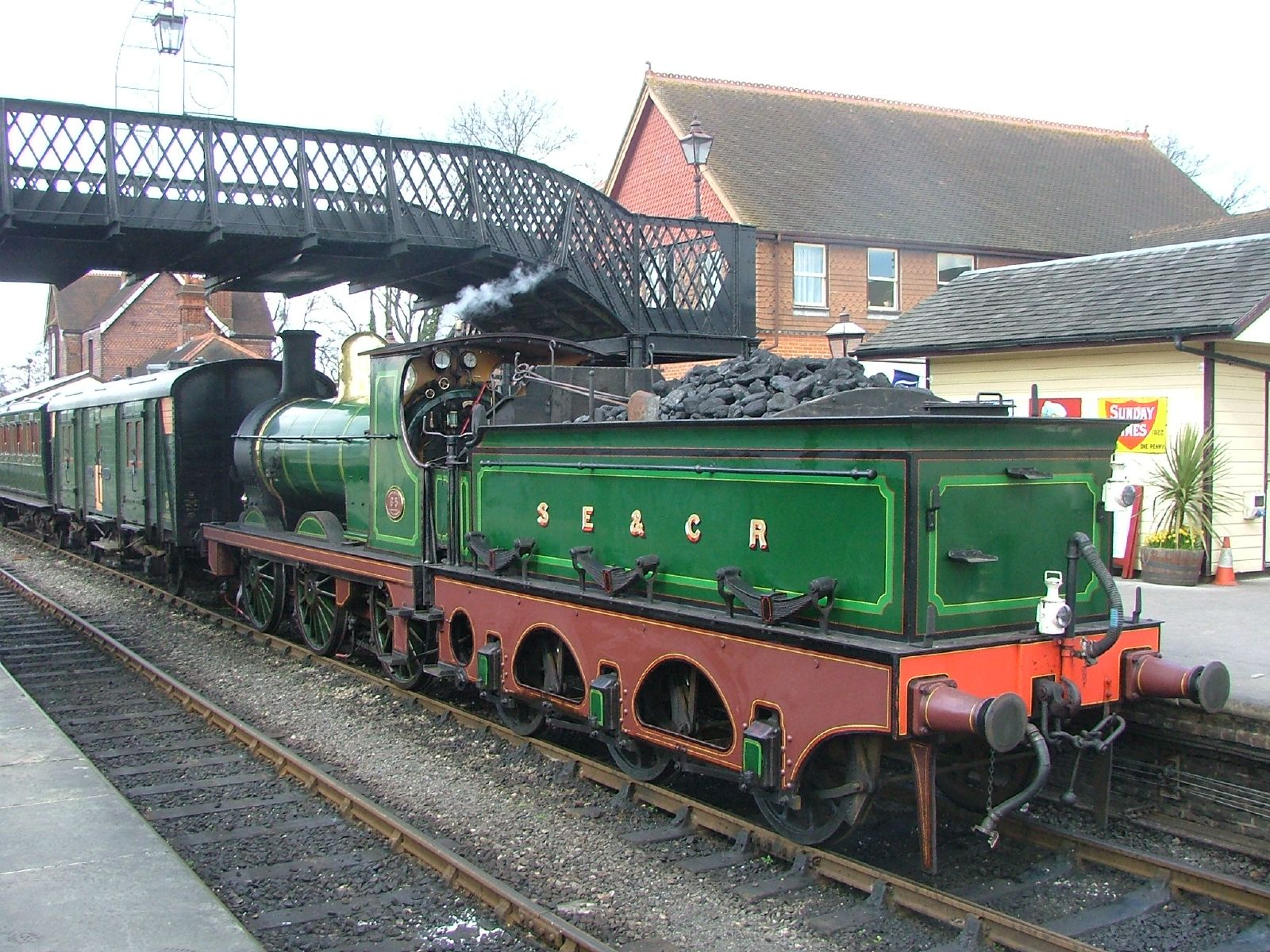
A SECR O1 Class (rebuilt from SER O class) 0-6-0, originally built in 1896

The SE&CR began connecting the two networks and new services were introduced, reaping the benefits of joint working. A significant step was the construction of a junction in 1902-4 between the SER and LC&DR main lines where they crossed near Bickley and St Mary Cray, east of Bromley; the LC&DR's line via Maidstone to Ashford was connected to the SER station at Ashford; and the SER branch from Strood to Chatham alongside the LC&DR's main line to Chatham was closed prior to World War I. The overlapping networks on the Isle of Thanet (Margate-Broadstairs-Ramsgate) were rationalised by the Southern Railway. Service cuts under BR saw Gravesend lose its second station.

== Further development ==
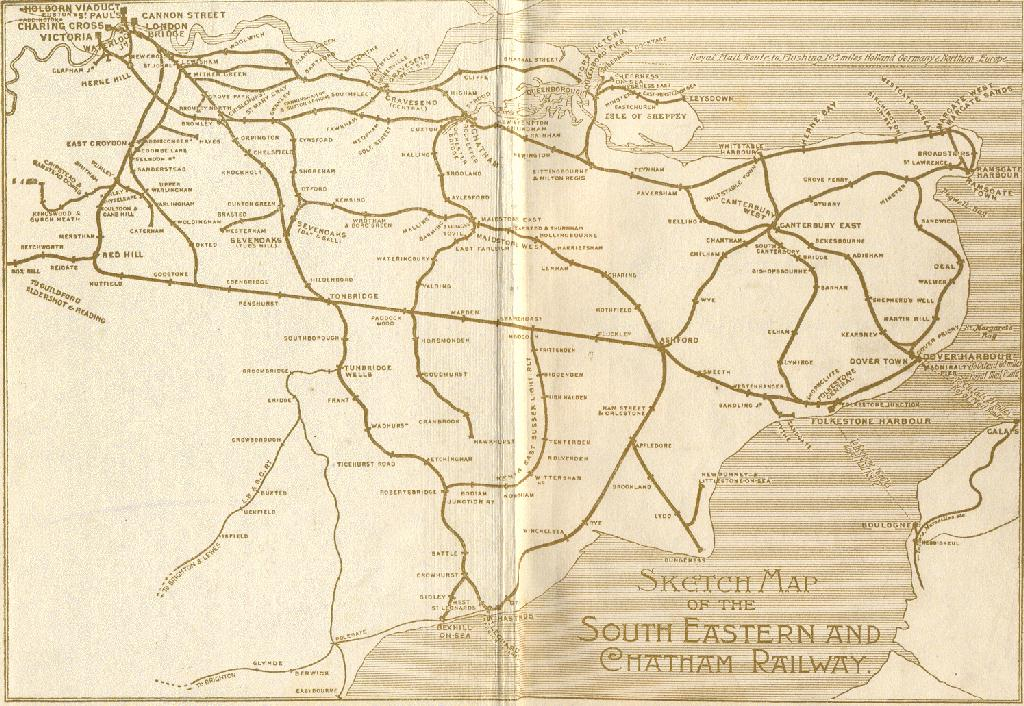
A 1912 map of the SE&CR network

After the formation of the SE&CR, three minor lines were built before the formation of the Southern Railway in 1923. They were:

- Tattenham Corner branch - Kingswood to Tattenham Corner, in 1901.
- The Sheppey Light Railway - branch off the Sheerness branch, in 1901 (closed 1950).
- Bexhill branch - Crowhurst, on the Hastings Line, to Bexhill West, in 1902 (now closed).

== Accidents and incidents ==
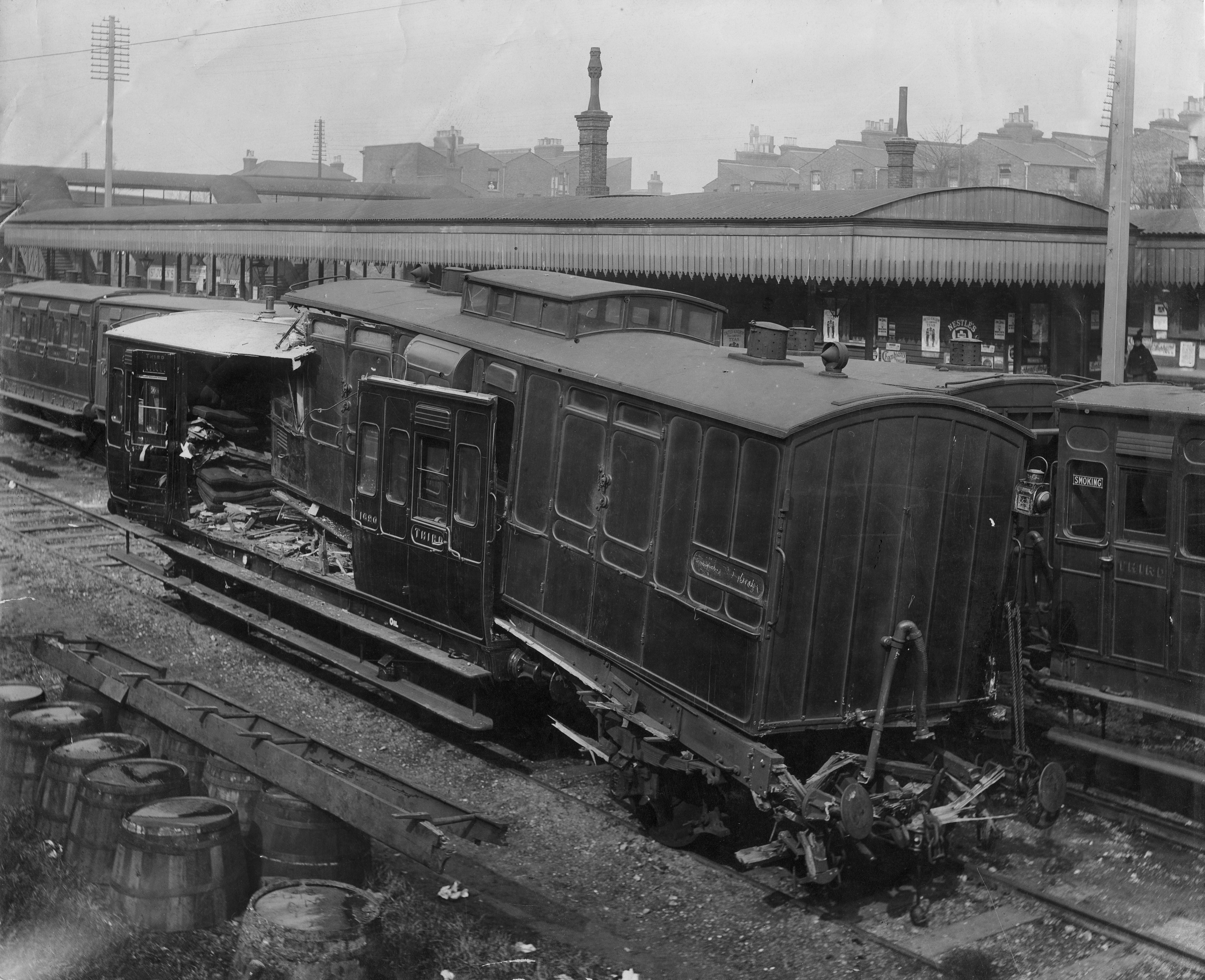
Damaged carriages from the St Johns 1898 train crash.

- On 21 March 1898, a passenger train hauled by F class No. 205 was in a rear-end collision with a passenger train at St Johns, London due to a signalman's error. Three people were killed and twenty were injured.
- In March 1904, a passenger train hauled by C class No. 294 was derailed at Gomshall, Surrey.
- On 6 December 1905, the roof of Charing Cross station collapsed after a tie-rod snapped. Six people were killed and eight were injured.
- On 5 March 1909, an express passenger train overran signals and was in collision with a mail train at Tonbridge Junction, Kent. Two people were killed and eleven were injured.
- On 11 March 1913, a passenger train failed to stop at Ramsgate Town station, Kent and crashed into a van, which was pushed through the buffers. The accident was caused by the failure to connect the brake pipe between the locomotive and its train. Ten people were injured.
- On 5 May 1919, a freight train overran signals and was in collision with a freight train that was being shunted at Paddock Wood, Kent. One person was killed.

== SE&CR locomotives ==
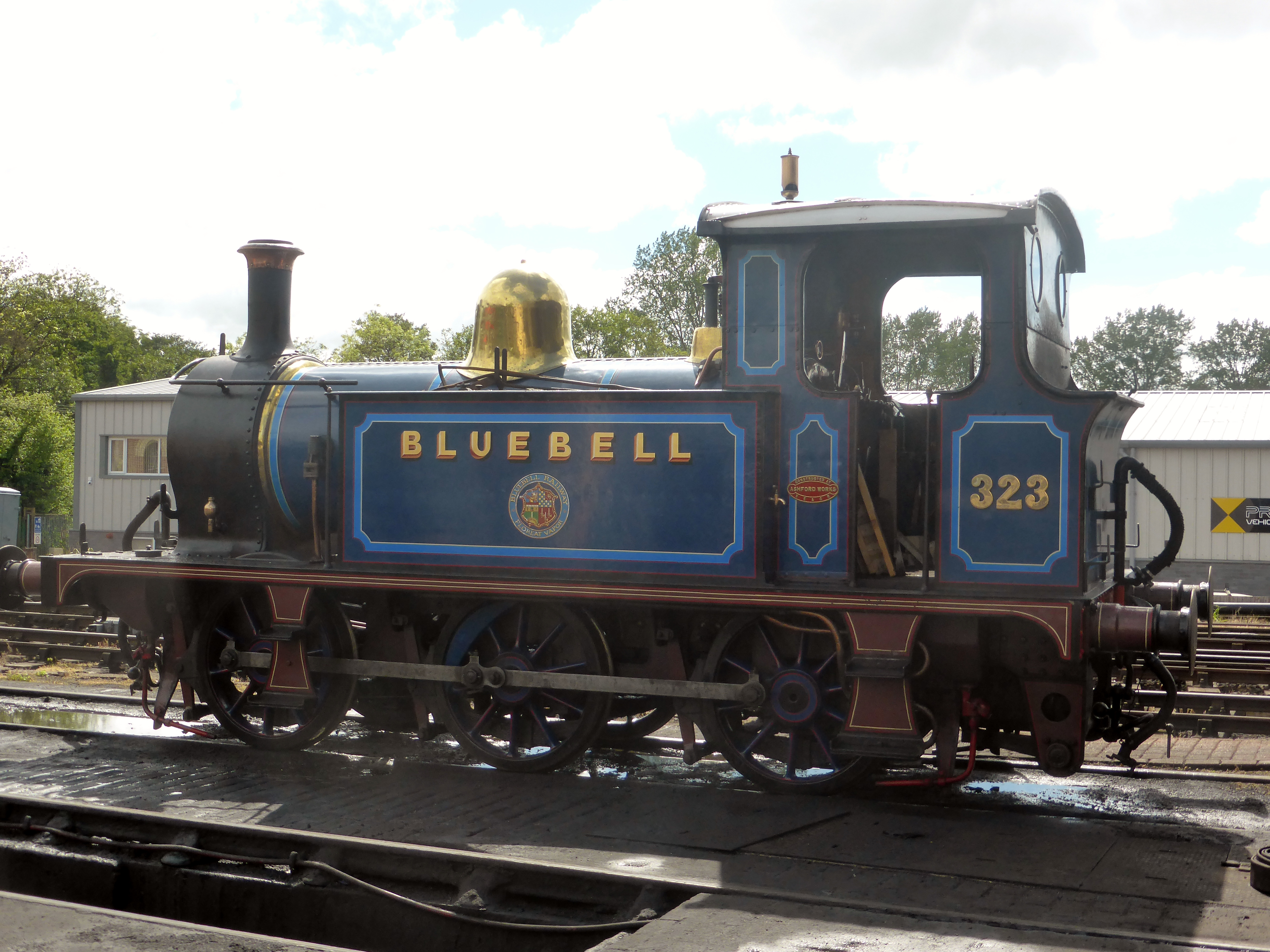
South Eastern and Chatham Railway (SECR) P Class No. 323

The LC&DR's works at Longhedge, Battersea closed in 1911 and production was concentrated at Ashford. Harry Wainwright was replaced by Richard Maunsell as Locomotive Superintendent in 1913.

- List of locomotives

== Electrification ==
With the development and implementation of electrification by the L&SWR, the LB&SCR, the "Tube" companies and tram operators in the early twentieth century, the SE&CR planned to start electrifying its lines. The proposed method would have used four rails, with one of the two additional rails energised at +1500 V DC and the other at −1500 V DC. Current would have been collected by side-contact, with the conductor rails protected by wooden boarding on top and at the sides. Trains would have consisted of multiple-units, each including two motor coaches, each motor coach having two traction motors: one motor coach would have been supplied by the positive conductor rail, the other by the negative. This very high voltage for rail track level systems was used in Britain only on the L&YR's 1200 V DC side-contact third-rail line from Manchester Victoria to Bury. Grouping in 1923 led to the Southern Railway adopting the L&SWR's standard of 660 V DC third rail on the SE&CR's network.

== Notable people ==
- Harry Wainwright, Chief Mechanical Engineer 1899–1913
- Richard Maunsell, Chief Mechanical Engineer 1913–1923
- Alfred Weeks Szlumper, Engineering Assistant 1880–1882.

== Ships ==
The SE&CR operated ships on cross-channel services.

Ex SER ships.

Ship	Launched	Tonnage (GRT)	Notes
Albert Victor	1880	814	Scrapped 1899.
Boulogne	1878	407	Sold in 1903 to British Central Africa Co Ltd.
Duchess of York	1895	996	Scrapped in 1904
Folkestone	1878	398	Scrapped in 1903.
Louise Dagmar	1880	818	Scrapped in 1899.
Mary Beatrice	1882	803	Scrapped in 1900
Princess of Wales	1898	1,009	Sold in 1910 to Argentina, renamed Río Uruguay.

Ex LC&DR ships.

Ship	Launched	Tonnage (GRT)	Notes
Breeze	1863	385	Scrapped in 1899.
Calais	1896	979	Sold in 1911 to Hattemer, Boulogne, renamed Au Revoir.
Calais-Douvres	1889	1,212	Sold in 1900 to Liverpool & Douglas Steamers.
Dover	1896	979	Scrapped in 1911.
Empress	1887	1,213	Scrapped in 1906
Foam	1862	495	Scrapped in 1901.
France	1864	365	Scrapped in 1899.
Invicta	1882	1,282	Scrapped in 1899.
Lord Warden	1896	979	Scrapped in 1911.
Petrel	1862	503	Scrapped in 1899.
Prince	1864	338	Scrapped in 1899.
Samphire	1861	336	Scrapped in 1899.
Victoria	1886	1,042	Scrapped in 1904
Wave	1863	385	Scrapped in 1899

Ships built for the SE&CR.

Ship	Launched	Tonnage (GRT)	Notes
Biarritz	1914	2,495	Scrapped in 1949 at Dover.
Canterbury	1900	561	Sold in 1926 to W E Guinness, renamed Arpha. Sold in 1938 to Sark Motorships Ltd. Requisitioned by the Royal Navy in 1939 as HMS Arpha. Sold in 1946 to Shell Caribbean Petroleum Ltd, renamed Coriano. Sold in 1951 to J M Perez Hernandez. Scrapped after 1955.
Empress	1907	1,689	Requisitioned by Royal Navy in 1914, sold to France in 1923. Scrapped at Dunkirk in 1933.
Engadine	1911	1,676	Requisitioned by Royal Navy in 1914, returned in 1920. Sold in 1933 to Philippines and renamed Corregidor. Struck a mine and sank on 17 December 1941.
Invicta	1905	1,680	Sold in 1923 to France. Scrapped in 1932.
Mabel Grace	1899	1,289	Scrapped in 1909.
Maid of Orleans	1918	2,384	Torpedoed on 28 June 1944 and sunk.
Onward	1905	1,671	Caught fire in 1918 at Folkestone and sank. Salvaged in 1920, sold to Isle of Man Steam Packet Company and rebuilt as Mona's Isle, the fourth IoMSPCo ship to carry that name. Scrapped in November 1948 at Milford Haven, Pembrokeshire.
Riviera	1911	1,674	Requisitioned by Royal Navy in 1914, returned in 1920. Sold in 1932 to Burns & Laird Lines Ltd, renamed Laird's Isle. Scrapped in October 1957 at Troon, Ayrshire.
The Queen	1903	1,676	Captured on 26 October 1916 by German destroyer S-60 and sunk.
Victoria	1907	1,689	Sold in 1928 to the IoMSPCo. Scrapped in January 1957 at Barrow in Furness.

Other ships operated by the SE&CR

Ship	Launched	Tonnage (displacement)	Notes
Gannet	1878	1,130	Used as an accommodation ship at Port Victoria in 1900–03.
