= Rolling stock of the Bluebell Railway =

The Bluebell Railway is a heritage line West Sussex and East Sussex in England.

== Steam locomotives ==
=== Operational ===
| Origin | Wheel arrangement | Class | Notes | Photograph |
|---|---|---|---|---|
| BR | 2-6-4T | Standard Class 4 | No. 80151. Built at Brighton in 1957, withdrawn in May 1967 and sent to Barry Scrapyard in October that year. It was purchased for preservation in 1974 and leaving Barry the following year. Overhaul began after the completion of 73082 "Camelot" in September 2015 and the overhaul saw replacement of its tyres and some new firebox plate-work. The loco was tested in June 2019 and returned to service the following month. Boiler ticket expires in 2029. | |
| SER | 0-6-0 | O1 Class | No. 65. Built in 1896 and rebuilt in 1908. Arrived at the Bluebell in 1996. The locomotive is seen as a reliable and remarkably powerful performer, as well as one which will complement the other SE&CR engines currently in traffic. The locomotive returned to service in July 2017. Boiler ticket expires in 2027. | |
| BR | 4-6-0 | 5MT | No. 73082 Camelot. Built in 1955. Arrived at the Bluebell in 1979, and owned by the 73082 Camelot Locomotive Society. The locomotive returned to service following its overhaul in October 2015. However, in 2020, persistent foundation ring leaks required the boiler to be lifted to attend to these as well as gaining a further ten-year ticket and undertaking any additional work required. The loco returned to service in September 2021. Boiler ticket expires in 2031. The engine was on loan to the West Somerset Railway for the steam gala between 27 and 30 September 2018. The engine departed for Bishops Lydeard by rail while in steam on 18 September. With 73082 not being mainline certified the move had to be done with the engine being towed behind a BR Class 37 no 37668. | 73082 at Sheffield Park |
| LB&SCR | 0-6-0T | A1 | No. 672 Fenchurch. Built in 1872. Arrived at Bluebell 1963. Returned to traffic in 2001 after a rebuild. This engine was withdrawn at the end of January 2011 following expiry of its boiler certificate. In early December 2019 she entered the Locomotive works and was dismantled to remove the boiler for assessment, and the remainder of the locomotive reassembled for a return to public display in the newly refurbished display shed. The overhaul was formally completed in January 2023. | |
| SR | 4-6-2 | Rebuilt Bulleid Light Pacific | No. 34059 Sir Archibald Sinclair. Built in 1947. Arrived at the Bluebell in 1979. Relaunched and renamed on 24 April 2009 and entered public service the following day after a 10-year rebuild from Barry condition. 34059 was the first rebuilt Battle of Britain Class locomotive to steam in preservation. After only 2 years of service on the Bluebell, 34059 was withdrawn from traffic in October 2011 with firebox problems. Remedial work on the boiler (thought to take around nine months) was undertaken, with the boiler being lifted and taken to Crewe. In early 2016, it was discovered the locomotive needed a new inner firebox, and the boiler was transferred to the South Devon Railway for work to be undertaken. The boiler was returned to Sheffield Park toward the end of 2019 and is being prepared for lifting onto the chassis. 34059 officially re-entered service on 1 January 2024. | 34059 at Sheffield Park station |
| LB&SCR | 4-4-2 | H2 | A replica of No 32424 Beachy Head (Brighton, 1911) is under construction at Sheffield Park. Work on the frames is currently under way with new holes being drilled into the tender frames. Re-tubing of the boiler is also in progress. In April 2013 the cylinders, bogie and trailing wheels had been fitted and the driving wheels had been delivered. In June 2014 the main driving wheels have been fitted & motion & frames completed. The boiler underwent testing throughout 2018. The locomotive is expected to be operational by Autumn 2024. In early 2020 the owning group announced plans to build an SECR E class as their next project once 32424 is complete but this was abandoned in 2024. 32424 was moved out of Atlantic House on 6 March and onto Bluebell Railway tracks to be connected with its tender for the first time. Running In is expected to commence during spring 2024. 32424 entered service in August 2024. | |

=== Undergoing overhaul, repair or restoration ===
| Origin | Wheel arrangement | Class | Owner | Notes | Photograph |
|---|---|---|---|---|---|
| SE&CR | 0-6-0T | Wainwright P class | | No. 27 Primrose. Built in 1910, and last worked in 1974. Arrived at the Bluebell in 1961. An overhaul was prepared and started in 1978 with the locomotive being dismantled, but it was paused for over 30 years due to the overhaul and maintenance of other locomotives before being restarted in 2012. This is a long term overhaul similar to those carried out on 672 and 178 due to the poor condition of the locomotive, it having been stored in pieces for many years. Amongst the many tasks undertaken for the overhaul have included replacement of sections of the frames and a new cylinder block. | The frames of 27 awaiting work to start |
| LSWR | 0-4-0T | B4 | The Bulleid Society | No. 96 Normandy Built in 1893. Arrived at Bluebell 1978. Funds are now being raised by the owning society, and it is hoped that any overhaul may commence after 21C123 Blackmoor Vale and 34059 Sir Archibald Sinclair are complete and the good condition of the loco is established. The need for this locomotive has become less with the acquisition of a small diesel locomotive for shunting duties and the use of other tank engines for steam shunts. In October 2023, it was announced that Normandy alongside two other Bluebell engines are to be sent into the works for overhauls for a return to service. On 5 March 2024, 96 and 30583 were moved into Atlantic House taking the places previously occupied by 32424 Beachy Head. Normandy's overhaul is to be undertook first with it not expected to be a major job like 30583. Normandy's overhaul is expected to cost around £110,000. | |
| SE&CR | 0-4-4T | Class H | | No. 263. Built in 1905. Arrived at the Bluebell in 1976, and returned to traffic after overhaul in July 2012. Boiler certificate expired 13 February 2022. Overhaul was started in November 2022 as the loco is in good mechanical condition but the boiler does require some minor attention. | 263 in the yard |
| LSWR | 4-4-2T | 0415 | Bluebell Railway | No. 488. Built in 1885. Arrived at Bluebell 1961. The locomotive is thought to require at least a new boiler barrel (if not a new boiler entirely) and possibly new wheels. No. 488 was painted as 30583 in BR Black for the 2019 Branchline Weekend. In October 2023, it was announced that 30583 alongside two other Bluebell engines are to be sent into the works for overhauls for a return to service. On 5 March 2024, 96 and 30583 were moved into Atlantic House taking the places previously occupied by 32424 Beachy Head. 30583 is to undergo an assessment to determine the extent of the work required to return the engine to steam. Its overhaul is to commence at a later date while work focuses on Normandy. | |
| SR | 0-6-0 | Maunsell Q Class | | No. 30541. Built in 1939. Arrived at the Bluebell in 1978. Owned by the Maunsell Society. The volunteer Loco Workshop Working Group carried out the overhaul of the locomotive, beginning in July 2011. The locomotive returned to service in April 2015 and ran until late 2022. It was withdrawn from service due to stay issues in the firebox and moved offsite for overhaul by external contractors in 2023. | 30541 at Sheffield Park |
| SR | 4-4-0 | V Schools class | | No. 928 Stowe. Built in 1934. Arrived at the Bluebell in 1980. Owned by the Maunsell Locomotive Society. Last worked in 1990. As of 2026, the locomotive is undergoing a full overhaul to return it to working order. | Stowe at Sheffield Park |
| BR | 2-6-2T (was 2-6-0) | Standard Class 2 (formerly 2-6-0) | | No. 84030 (formerly 78059). Recovered from Barry Scrapyard without a tender in May 1983. Was originally a tender engine. None of the original Standard Class 2 tank engines (84000–84029) survives, so this conversion will create the sole representative of the class. Reconstruction as a tank engine is well under way, with work currently focused on the frames, to which the new extension has now been welded. | The boiler of 78059 with 84030 numberplate |

=== Stored or on display ===
| Origin | Wheel arrangement | Class | Owner | Notes | Photograph |
|---|---|---|---|---|---|
| Manning Wardle | 0-6-0ST | K Class | Bluebell Railway | No. 641 Sharpthorn. Built in 1877. Arrived at Bluebell 1982. Used by the contractors in the building of the original Lewes and East Grinstead Railway (now the Bluebell Line) in the early 1880s. Its use is limited and remains a static display. In August 2014, a cosmetic restoration began. Sharpthorn has not fared well as of late October 2018, with rust and paint chipping. | |
| LB&SCR | 0-6-0T | A1 | Bluebell Railway | No. 55 Stepney. Built in 1875. Seen by many as the flagship of the fleet, it was the first locomotive to be permanently based on the line in May 1960. The engine was relaunched into traffic in time for the 50th Anniversary of his arrival on the line on 17 May 2010, emerging in the black livery he wore during the 1960 season. Withdrawn from service in March 2014 after its main steam pipe failed. The engine requires a full overhaul, including a new cylinder block, although this is deemed an unlikely prospect so it is possible the locomotive may remain on static display. It has been restored to its original Stroudley Golden Ochre colour. The locomotive became internationally famous for starring in Wilbert Awdry's Stepney the "Bluebell" Engine, part of The Railway Series, and the famous children's TV show Thomas & Friends, created by Britt Allcroft and later acquired by HIT Entertainment in the 2000s. On display in the newly refurbished display shed. | |
| Fletcher Jennings | 0-4-0T | Class B | Bluebell Railway | No. 3 Baxter. Built in 1877. Named 'Captain Baxter' in the late 1920s after one of the directors of the Dorking Greystone Lime Company at Betchworth, where the locomotive worked. The name was shortened to 'Baxter' in the 1940s. Arrived at the Bluebell in August 1960. The engine returned to steam in August 2010 and is frequently used for shunting and for various tasks around the line. Baxter was fitted with vacuum brakes during 2011 to enable its solo use on passenger stock for the first time. In 2014, the engine starred in the movie Muppets Most Wanted, known as Randy Stevenot No. 3 with some American attachments. In July 2016, Baxter was invited to the Talyllyn Railway to celebrate Dolgoch's 150th birthday and becoming the first standard gauge engine to visit the railway. Boiler ticket expired 8 October 2018 and Baxter is now displayed in the newly refurbished display shed. | Captain Baxter in Sheffield Park in 2011 after overhaul |
| NLR | 0-6-0T | Class 75 | Bluebell Railway | No. 58850. (painted as LMS 27505). Built in 1880. Arrived at Bluebell 1962. Last worked in 1993 and is awaiting overhaul. Was on loan to the Barrow Hill Roundhouse and the Ecclesbourne Valley Railway until 2006, when it was moved back to the Bluebell with a view to a quick overhaul. However, with the work required being more extensive than originally thought, it has yet to receive any major attention. The overhaul will require a new firebox to be fitted. A cosmetic restoration has taken place with the intention to repaint it in black to match the livery of the Ransome & Rapiers crane currently on display at Horsted Keynes. | |
| LB&SCR | 0-6-2T | E4 | Bluebell Railway | No. B473 (formerly known as Birch Grove). Built in 1898. Arrived at the Bluebell in 1962. B473 returned to service in January 2010 in 1920s Southern Railway livery following overhaul. The locomotive had repairs to the firebox were completed, once again returning in August 2014. However, in 2016 the same firebox fault occurred and the repair cannot be repeated, so the decision was made to withdraw B473 from service even though the boiler ticket was due to expire in 2020. The next overhaul will require major replacement of copper plates forming the inner firebox. On display in the newly refurbished display shed. | Birch Grove at Kingscote |
| SE&CR | 0-6-0 | Wainwright C Class | Bluebell Railway | No. 592. Built in 1902. Arrived at the Bluebell in 1970. 592 was prematurely withdrawn from traffic in September 2012 due to a lack of power resulting in the fitting of a new cylinder liner, and a return to service was made in August 2013. A further withdrawal was made in late 2014 for boiler repairs to be carried out, and 592 returned to service in April 2015. The locomotive was in restricted usage following the discovery of worn flanges. After the boiler ticket expired in May 2017, its next overhaul will require new tyres, a new cylinder block, new springs and a new copper firebox. | 592 at Horsted Keynes. |
| SE&CR | 0-6-0T | Wainwright; P Class | Bluebell Railway | No. 178. Built in 1910. Arrived at the Bluebell in 1969. Returned to traffic on 27 February 2010 following extensive overhaul. The locomotive was restored to full SECR goods livery in 2010. Sadly in late 2014, after four years in ticket the locomotive failed with issues with its cylinder block after a repair which failed it was found that the cylinder block has the same crack since when it arrived in 1969. 178 saw out the remainder of its ticket on light duties only, including a spell operating shuttle trains at the National Railway Museum in York during 2017. Boiler certificate expired in October 2020. No. 178 is presently on static display at One:One Collection in Margate, the engine is placed in the entrance hall. | 178 double heading with 263 |
| SE&CR | 0-6-0T | Wainwright P Class | Bluebell Railway | No. 323 Bluebell. Built in 1910. Arrived at the Bluebell in July 1960 as the second locomotive purchased from British Railways. The locomotive returned to steam in March 2011, painted in its unique 'Bluebell Blue' livery. Withdrawn from service in February 2019 requiring major boiler and mechanical work. On display in the newly refurbished display shed. In October 2023, it was announced that Bluebell alongside two other Bluebell engines are to be sent into the works for overhauls for a return to service. Bluebell will be sent into the workshop in early 2024 with the goal of returning to traffic by the summer. | 323 at Horsted Keynes |
| SR | 2-6-0 | Maunsell U Class | Maunsell Locomotive Society | No. 1618. Built in 1928. Arrived at Bluebell 1977 from the Kent & East Sussex Railway. Last worked in 1994 and is on static display awaiting a 10-year overhaul. Its tender was loaned to the Watercress Line in 2010 as a replacement for classmate 31806's, which was heavily damaged in a fire at Ropley. The tender was returned to the Bluebell in mid-2011, 31806's having been repaired. 31618 has been painted in lined BR black to match the tender, and to smarten the appearance of the engine up after many years in the shed. The overhaul is not likely to start until the work has completed on others. Its overhaul requires boiler work, including firebox and re-profiled tyres. | |
| SR | 2-6-0 | Maunsell; U Class | Maunsell Locomotive Society | No. 1638. Built in 1931. Arrived in 1980. Returned to service in February 2006. The boiler ticket expired in January 2016, but due to a number of minor faults and the need for a new hydraulic test, it was decided to withdraw it from service in July 2015. 1638 was a reliable performer over the nine and a half years of running, although requiring a couple of spells in the works for boiler and firebox repairs, and bore the brunt of the heavier services on the Bluebell over its period in service. | 1638 at Sheffield Park yard |
| SR | 4-6-0 | S15 | Maunsell Locomotive Society | No. 847. Built in 1936. Arrived at the Bluebell in 1978 and owned by the Maunsell Locomotive Society. It returned to service following its latest overhaul in December 2013 after being out of service for 16 years. Withdrawn from service in December 2021 due to worn tyres. Will also require major firebox repairs at its next overhaul. | 847 running round at Sheffield Park |
| GWR | 4-4-0 | 3200 | Bluebell Railway | No. 9017 Earl of Berkeley. Built in 1938. Arrived at Bluebell 1963. Returned to traffic in November 2003 after an overhaul which included a number change from 3217. The condition of the firebox saw this locomotive withdrawn in June 2011. This locomotive has been considered as the next medium-sized locomotive to be overhauled, the extensive work carried out during the previous overhaul rendering this a relatively straightforward job. The tender was loaned to the Gloucestershire Warwickshire Railway in 2014 for use behind GWR 7800 Manor Class No. 7820 Dinmore Manor until the overhaul of that is completed which returned to the Bluebell in October 2015. The locomotive was transported to Goodwood Motor Circuit near Chichester in September 2018 and put on static display throughout the duration of that year's Goodwood Revival as part of a celebration of "British Transport". In February 2024 it was announced that from March 2024, 9017 is to be placed on display inside a new museum in Aberystwyth at the Vale of Rheidol Railway. The locomotive remained on display in Aberystwyth until 2026 when in February 2026 it was announced that starting in the spring of 2026, 9017 was to be placed on display inside The Engine House at the Severn Valley Railway replacing 7819 Hinton Manor which would take 9017's place in Aberystwyth. | |
| SR | 4-6-2 | West Country | The Bulleid Society | No. 21C123 Blackmoor Vale. Built in 1946. Arrived at Bluebell 1971. Returned to traffic in 2000. Withdrawn early in June 2008 following repeated failures and firebox problems, and is currently awaiting overhaul. A new firebox will be needed at the locomotive's next overhaul, which should cost around £150,000. The locomotive's owners, the Bulleid Society, have purchased new thermic syphons, as the first stage in obtaining the components for this work. A new inner firebox will also be constructed alongside that for 34059. It is currently stored at Horsted Keynes station having been moved there in March 2023. | |
| BR | 4-6-0 | Standard Class 4 | Bluebell Railway | No. 75027. Built in 1952. Arrived at Bluebell 1969 as the Bluebell's first "large" engine. Withdrawn February 2007 - shortly before the expiry of its boiler ticket - following a number of small failures. The engine is currently on display at Horsted Keynes while awaiting overhaul to free up space at Sheffield Park. After many years stored outside at Horsted Keynes, the engine received some cosmetic attention in 2019 which included giving the engine a fresh coat of paint. Stored in the carriage shed at Sheffield Park. | |
| BR | 2-6-4T | Standard Class 4 | Bluebell Railway | No. 80100. Arrived at Bluebell in 1978. Awaiting major restoration from Barry Scrapyard condition. Unlikely that a start will be made on restoration in the foreseeable future, at least until 84030 enters traffic. The locomotive is currently stored at Horsted Keynes station under a tarpaulin. It is seen as a long term option, being the only Standard Tank on the line actually owned by the railway. | |
| BR | 2-10-0 | 9F | Bluebell Railway | No. 92240. Built in 1958. Arrived at Bluebell 1978. Withdrawn in December 2002 due to deteriorating tubes. This locomotive, along with 75027, was moved to Horsted Keynes for display in early 2010 to allow space at Sheffield Park to be used to store stock during work on the Woodpax project. An appeal was launched to raise funds for a return to steam, in November 2022 the loco was taken back to Sheffield park and in 2023 work has started on the locomotives tender the locomotive currently being stored at Horsted Keynes. Its overhaul would likely take only a short time to complete given the good mechanical condition of the locomotive. | |

== Diesel locomotives ==
=== On loan ===
| Origin | Wheel arrangement | Class | Notes | Photograph |
|---|---|---|---|---|
| British Rail | 0-6-0DM | 09 | D4106 (previously 09018). Bought by a consortium of locomotive department volunteers, D4106 is on loan to the railway on an "at-cost" basis where the railway hires it until the members receive their funds back. The higher gearing of an 09 compared to an 08 allows it to be used in emergencies on passenger services at 25 mph (40 km/h), a role it undertook for the first time during summer 2013. | |
| British Rail | Bo-Bo | 33 | D6570 Ashford, bought by the same consortium of loco owners as D4106. Arrived from K&ESR 2 July 2021. Currently undergoing bodywork repairs plus other repairs that are needed/required | |

=== Operational ===
| Origin | Wheel arrangement | Notes | Photograph |
|---|---|---|---|
| Sentinel | B | Works No. 10241 and built in 1966, although technically built after the company became owned by Rolls-Royce. The locomotive was rebuilt by Thomas Hill in 1973 following accident damage. This engine was acquired by the Bluebell in 2010 as a replacement for a hired-in class 08, for use primarily as the Horsted Keynes carriage works shunter. This is the first diesel locomotive ever to be owned outright by the railway, and is known by Bluebell volunteers as 'Skippy'. | |
| Howard | B | No. 957, petrol-engined locomotive. The restoration, courtesy of the Alf Brown group, was the longest running on the railway. The locomotive was run for the first time at the 50th Anniversary celebrations in August 2010. As of October 2018, it is stored at Horsted Keynes under a tarp between 58850 and the carriage shop. | |

== Electric motive power ==
=== Stored or on display ===
| Origin | Class | Notes | Photograph |
|---|---|---|---|
| British Rail | 423 | 4-Vep unit 3417 "Gordon Pettitt" is currently on loan to the Southern Electric Traction Group, who intend to operate it on the national rail network once its restoration is complete. The unit was stored at Clapham Junction for some time prior to a move to Ilford for some cosmetic work, and has operated over Bluebell metals with a class 73 on special shuttle services between East Grinstead station and the railhead at Imberhorne tip. The unit is currently being given a full restoration at Strawberry Hill by the SETG with a view to a return to the national network. | |

== Carriages ==
=== 4- and 6-wheeled coaches ===
The eventual plan is to put together two complete 4- or 5-coach sets of LBSCR and LCDR carriages. It is acknowledged that this will take many years, but three carriages are already in service with another three under overhaul. Most of these carriages have been rescued as grounded bodies from within bungalows or on farms. Underframes for many of them are (or will be) provided by shortening SR passenger-rated van underframes.

| Origin | Number | Type | Notes | Photograph |
|---|---|---|---|---|
| LCDR | 48 | 6-wheeled Brake | Built in 1894. Stored awaiting major restoration, but the underframe has received some attention. This coach was formerly used as a break room. Unlike any other preserved LCDR six-wheelers, its original six-wheeled chassis is still intact, and deemed eminently restorable. | |
| LCDR | 114 | 4-wheeled Brake Third | Built in 1899. Returned to traffic in 2006 after an extensive restoration; was previously used as a bungalow. In use with the other 4-wheelers. Painted as LCDR 114. | |
| LCDR | 51 | 4-wheeled Brake Second | Built in 1889, basically identical to 114. In 2009 the carriage gained public support in an appeal on national television for funds toward overhaul, including provision for disabled passengers, something at the time unavailable on the line's vintage trains. It has now entered service in use with the other 4 wheeled coaches, painted in SECR livery as 3360. | |
| LCDR | 668 | 6-wheel Third | Built in 1897. Returned to service on 25 June 2016 following restoration. This was a grounded body, and has been mounted on a two-axle underframe. The result provides a carriage similar to other ex-LCDR six-wheelers used on the Isle of Wight by the SR. The carriage has been painted in SECR livery to match 3360 and numbered 3188. | |
| LBSCR | 661 | Stroudley 6-wheel First | Built in 1880. In use. It is planned to eventually be part of a Stroudley train. Now placed on a 4-wheel underframe of SR PMVY 2216. | |
| LBSCR | 676 | Stroudley 4-wheel Brake Third | Built in 1875. Stored awaiting restoration. Moved into the OP4 carriage shed at Horsted Keynes in 2018. Now on underframe of PMVY 1728. | |
| LBSCR | 949 | Stroudley 4-wheel Brake Third | Built in 1881. Undergoing restoration, a new underframe has been found and the structure is complete. The carriage has been reassembled externally and is awaiting painting and varnishing as well as the interior rebuilding. Body placed on underframe of SR PMVY 1193. | |
| LBSCR | 328 | Stroudley 4-wheel Third | Built in 1890. Moved into the works in early 2010. The underframe has been refurbished and work on reconstructing the bodywork is underway. | |
| LBSCR | 992 | Stroudley 4-wheel Third | Built in 1880. Stored awaiting restoration. Stored on underframe of carriage no. 4035. | |
| LBSCR | 725 | Stroudley 4-wheel Brake Third | Built in 1878. Recovered in 1998 and stored in a dismantled state. Is a slightly different design to 676 and 949 as it has full height partitions and luggage racks. | |
| LBSCR | 35 | Craven 4-wheel Second | Three compartment carriage built in 1856. Stored awaiting restoration. Work is planned to start once the other 4-wheel Stroudley carriages are finished. | |
| LBSCR | 94 | Craven 4-wheel Full Brake | Built in 1858. Stored undergoing restoration. Currently placed on a wagon underframe. | |
| LBSCR | 221 | Craven 4-wheel Brake Third | Built in the early 1850s (1850–52) as a Luggage Brake Second and later downgraded to a Brake Third. Withdrawn from service by 1888 and sold c1901. Salvaged from a house in Battle on 26 August 2009. Awaiting restoration. In July 2011, this carriage was seriously damaged by fire. Although most of the original wood was destroyed, it would've been replaced to reconstruct this body anyway, metal components still remain. | |
| LBSCR | 204 | Craven 4-wheel Quadrant-windowed First | Three compartment carriage built in 1866. Stored awaiting restoration. | |
| LSWR | 25 | 6-wheeled 34-ft Family Saloon | Built in 1885. Stored awaiting restoration. Stored on underframe of carriage no. 4035 | |
| SER | 172 | 6-wheeled Saloon | Built in 1898. Stored awaiting restoration. Stored on underframe of SR van. 442. | |
| SER | 18?? | Brake Third | Built in either 1877 or 1878. Body only. Stored under a tarpaulin. The only surviving SER guard's brake vehicle. | |
| SER | 2159 | 6-wheeled Third | Built in 1887. Body only. Stored under a tarpaulin. | |

=== Pre-grouping bogie coaches ===
The operational coaches of this type form a set of coaches which have operated over recent years as the Bluebell's regular Vintage set. The Bluebell possesses one of the largest collections of these types of carriage in the world.

| Origin | Number | Type | Notes | Photograph |
|---|---|---|---|---|
| LBSCR | 7598 | Bogie First | Built in 1903. Returned to traffic in 1999 and won the 'Best Coach of the Year' award for 2002/03. After some time awaiting tyre turning, the coach has now returned to regular service. | |
| LSWR | 320 | Lavatory Third | Built in 1900. One of the first two coaches to operate on the preserved Bluebell Line. Stored undercover awaiting eventual restoration. | |
| LSWR | 494 | Corridor Third | Built in 1911. Stored awaiting restoration. | |
| LSWR | 1520 | Brake Third | Operational. Built in 1910. The carriage was relaunched into traffic in April 2010 following major rebuild from departmental use. The carriage has been finished in LSWR livery, and as such only sees limited use as it does not match other carriages of a similar vintage. | |
| SECR | 950 | Semi Saloon Lav. Brake Second | Stored. Built 1907. Under a tarpaulin on the Ardingly Branch. Not owned by the Bluebell Railway, private owner. Awaiting restoration. | |
| SECR | 971 | Hundred Seater | Built in 1923. Withdrawn from traffic in 2007 for what was hoped to be a quick overhaul. Examination revealed a much heavier amount of work was required on the carriage's side panels and underframe, as well as a need to replace rotted sections of the roof and internal partitions, as well as re-trimming of the seats. The carriage is currently in store awaiting restoration. | |
| SECR | 1061 | Birdcage Brake | Built in 1909. Stored awaiting restoration. Inside the Horsted Keynes carriage shed. | |
| SECR | 1084 | Birdcage Brake | Operational. The carriage returned to traffic in November 2011 following rebuild. | |
| SECR | 1098 | Hundred Seater | Built in 1922. Operational. The carriage is popular among many visitors to and members of the line. | |
| SECR | 1170 | Birdcage Brake | Built in 1912. Awaiting restoration with the roof requiring major attention. The interior will need to be reconstructed from scratch, but fortunately this is fairly plain and should be straightforward. | |
| SR | 1050 | Bogie Third | Stored awaiting overhaul. Included in this section because it was formed in 1924 by the rebuilding of several old SER carriage bodies onto a new bogie underframe. Is being considered for overhaul. Under a tarpaulin in the Horsted Keynes carriage shed. | |

=== Metropolitan carriages ===
Four carriages built in 1898 and 1900 for use out of Baker Street station in London. Initially steam hauled, later used in electric trains, reverting to steam haulage on the Chesham branch in 1940. Purchased by the Bluebell Railway in 1961, and used until withdrawn in the late 1960s in need of major attention. Now returned to service and are unique as a close-coupled set of vintage carriages. The restoration team were the recipient of the Heritage Railways Association's award as overall winner of their 2006/7 carriage competition. The carriages have seen regular use on London Underground in recent years as part of steam operations on the Metropolitan line, and possess TOPS identities for movements over the Network Rail network to and from London.

| Origin | Number | Type | Notes | Photograph |
|---|---|---|---|---|
| Metropolitan | 394 | Full Third | Built in 1900. Returned to traffic in 1999. Received major rebuilding to remove the driving cab added in the 1930s when the set was converted to electric operation. | |
| Metropolitan | 368 | Composite | Built in 1898. Returned to traffic in 2002. In the 1960s it was the first of the four to suffer from a leaking roof, and was withdrawn from service. A start was made on dismantling it, with the idea being to use the underframe for a rail-carrier. Consideration was given to burning it as a publicity stunt to raise funds for a new carriage shed. However the body, riddled with dry rot, survived, being stored in the dry once the carriage shed was built in 1972, so saving the vehicle for its eventual restoration. | |
| Metropolitan | 412 | Composite | Built in 1900. Returned to traffic in late 2006. | |
| Metropolitan | 387 | Brake Third | Built in 1898. Returned to traffic in 1999. As with 394, the driving cab installed later had to be removed during restoration to return the set to as-built condition. | |

=== Maunsell coaches ===
These carriages designed by Richard Maunsell for the Southern Railway provide a vintage-like experience for the passenger, whilst as corridor vehicles they also offer access to more modern facilities. In addition to those preserved on the railway, the Bluebell also has the underframe of coach 3725 and the bogies from several other coaches that were converted to Carflat wagons in the 1960s.

| Origin | Number | Type | Notes | Photograph |
|---|---|---|---|---|
| Maunsell | 1309 | Open Third | Built in 1935. In service and used on passenger trains. This coach is unique in preservation, and was restored from stripped-out departmental condition, in part thanks to parts stripped from identical No 1306 when the latter was in a scrap yard. On restoration in 1984 it won the first ever ARPS (now HRA) "Coach of the Year" award. | |
| Maunsell | 1336 | Open Third, "Drop Light" | Built in 1933. In service and used on passenger trains, having been restored from stripped-out ex-departmental condition. | |
| Maunsell | 1365 | Composite Dining Saloon / Open Third | Built in 1927. Stored awaiting overhaul after being used on passenger trains regularly in the 1970s. Another number for this carriage is 7866. | |
| Maunsell | 2356 | Corridor Third | Built in 1931. Awaiting overhaul, was used for some years as the Carriage and Wagon Department Mess Coach. Overhaul possible in the future. | |
| Maunsell | 3687 | Corridor Brake Third | Built in 1931. Entered service in 2025 following an extensive restoration at Horsted Keynes. | |
| Maunsell | 3724 | Corridor Brake Third | Built in 1930. Stripped out and rebuilt for use on Chipmans weed-killer train. Stored awaiting restoration, following use as an exhibition vehicle. During its eventual restoration it may be converted into a wheelchair-accessible coach on passenger trains. | |
| Maunsell | 4441 | Unclassed Brake | Built in 1933. Awaiting overhaul with a seriously damaged underframe but a reasonably complete body. It is planned to swap underframes with 4444 in the fullness of time, so this one can be restored. | |
| Maunsell | 4444 | Nondescript Brake | Built in 1933. The carriage body was scrapped during 2021, following the salvaging of restorable components. Its body was affected by dry rot before it arrived on the Bluebell. It is planned that 4444 will donate its underframe to 4441, the body of 4441 being in better condition. | |
| Maunsell | 4922 | Travelling Post Office | Built in 1939. Stored awaiting restoration but it has been given low priority as it is not a passenger carrying vehicle. TPO 4922 was purchased in 1977 on the merit of having a complete interior and was restored to running order in 1980. However the paint failed to adhere to the galvanising, and so 4922 was placed in storage in 1984. | |
| Maunsell | 5644 | Corridor Composite | Built in 1930. Stored awaiting restoration. Purchased in 1989 from Chipmans as part of CWT Set 8. This carriage has had its roof recovered but it was found the previous roof covering had been damaged and allowed water ingress. The carriage will require replacement cant rails and eradication of dry rot as part of its restoration. It is considered to be one of the gems of the Bluebell's Maunsell fleet. | |
| Maunsell | 6575 | Corridor Brake Composite | Built in 1929. Stored awaiting a fairly major overhaul particularly at the brake end. The carriage was repainted into Bluebell Blue livery to be partnered with Stepney as part of the 50th Anniversary celebrations. This carriage also featured in a limited edition Hornby pack bought out for the 50th Anniversary. | |
| Maunsell | 6686 | Corridor Brake Composite | Built in 1935. Operational, won the 'Highly Commended Coach of the Year' award for 1998/99. First class seating recently underwent refurbishment. | |
| Maunsell | 7864 | Kitchen Buffet | Built in 1932. Moved to the Bluebell Railway in 1962, used until 1982 as a static buffet at Sheffield Park, then placed into storage. Restoration commenced in 2024. | |

=== Bulleid carriages ===
The 1940s Southern Railway designs of Oliver Bulleid produced a very clean, modern-looking carriage, many of the features of which were perpetuated in the BR standard (Mk. I) designs. The Bluebell's collection contains examples of SR built, contractor built and BR built carriages. It is unfortunate that none of the shorter, early Bulleid designed carriages have survived.

| Origin | Number | Type | Notes | Photograph |
|---|---|---|---|---|
| Bulleid | 1456 | Open Third | Built in 1947. On loan to the Mid Hants Railway until 2037 where it has been restored to operational condition. | |
| Bulleid | 1464 | Open Third | Built in 1950. In service and used on passenger trains. | |
| Bulleid | 1481 | Open Third | Built in 1950. Out of service awaiting a fairly major overhaul with the body structure needing attention and replacement of external paneling. | |
| Bulleid | 1482 | Open Third | Built in 1950. In service and used on passenger trains. Received repairs and a repaint in 2019. | |
| Bulleid | 2515 | Semi-Open Brake Third | Built in 1951. Awaiting major underframe overhaul. Could be back in traffic quickly as body itself is sound. | |
| Bulleid | 2526 | Semi-Open Brake Third | Built in 1951. In service and used on passenger trains. | |
| Bulleid | 4227 | Semi-Open Brake Third | Built in 1948. Awaiting restoration. | |
| Bulleid | 4279 | Semi-Brake Open Third | Built in 1949. Withdrawn in 2015, now awaiting overhaul. | |
| Bulleid | 5768 | Corridor Composite | Built in 1947. In October 2009 the carriage began to receive a major overhaul which will include work on the bodywork and floor. Owned by the Bulleid Society. This carriage is owned by the Bulleid Society, and is the only surviving loco-hauled Bulleid-design carriage with first class accommodation. Returned to service in 2019. | |

=== British Railways standard steam stock (Mk.I) ===
The staple of most preserved railways, on the Bluebell Mk1s only form a proportion of the operational stock. They are a durable design, representing in many ways the culmination of traditional carriage design in the UK, prior to the introduction of monocoque techniques.

| Origin | Number | Type | Notes | Photograph |
|---|---|---|---|---|
| British Railways | 1674 | Restaurant Buffet (Refurbished) | Built in 1961. Currently in service as part of the Lounge Car Service. | |
| British Railways | 1818 | Restaurant Miniature Buffet | Built in 1960. In service and used on passenger trains. | |
| British Railways | 1838 | Restaurant Miniature Buffet | Built in 1959. Currently out of traffic awaiting overhaul to its end structure. This work is now being undertaken at Cranmore, East Somerset Railway from November 2019. | |
| British Railways | 3064 | Open First | Built in 1955. In service and used as part of the Lounge Car Service. | |
| British Railways | 4754 | Open Second | Built in 1957. Formerly used by the Bicester Military Railway, this carriage was acquired from the Ministry of Defence in 2014. The intention is that once 4754 has entered traffic, the more modern-looking 4957, which is in need of refurbishment, will be offered for sale. Under restoration at Horsted Keynes. | |
| British Railways | 4824 | Open Second | Built in 1959. In service and used as part of the Lounge Car service. | |
| British Railways | 4941 | Saloon | Built in 1962. In service and used on passenger trains. Converted to multi-use saloon with wheelchair lifts. | |
| British Railways | 4957 | Open Second | Built in 1962. In service and used on passenger trains, but only when the railway needs the additional seating capacity. This is due to the inferior quality of the interior compared to other carriages, which is a result of it having been refitted to serve as a classroom on The Travelling College in the late 1980s. The intention is that once 4754 has entered traffic, this coach, which is in need of refurbishment, will be offered for sale. | |
| British Railways | 5034 | Saloon | Built in 1962. In service and used on passenger trains. Converted to multi-use saloon with wheelchair lifts. This carriage had been employed as a dormitory coach on The Travelling College. Returned from Cranmore in November 2019 following a structural overhaul of both ends. The remaining work will be finished at Horsted Keynes. The aim is to have the vehicle back in traffic in time for the line's 60th Anniversary celebrations in August 2020. | |
| British Railways | 16012 | Corridor Composite | Built in 1957. In service and used on passenger trains. | |
| British Railways | 16210 | Corridor Composite | Built in 1961. In service and used on passenger trains. | |
| British Railways | 21246 | Brake Composite | Built in 1962. In service following comprehensive overhaul after arrival in 2011. Returned to service for 2018 Santa Specials. | |
| British Railways | 21271 | Brake Composite | Built in 1964. Awaiting restoration. Has had some attention done to it. | |
| British Railways | 25728 | Corridor Second | Built in 1961. In service and used on passenger trains. | |
| British Railways | 25769 | Corridor Second | Built in 1961. Awaiting end overhaul. The bogies have recently been swapped with 25728 to keep that in traffic. | |
| British Railways | 34556 | Brake Corridor Second | Built in 1955. In service and used as part of the Lounge Car service. | |
| British Railways | 35207 | Brake Corridor Second | Built in 1958. In Service. | |

=== Pullman and Wagon-Lits cars ===
Several of these have been overhauled and operate regularly as the Bluebell Railway's Golden Arrow dining train (lunch and dinner).

| Origin | Number | Name | Type | Notes | Photograph |
|---|---|---|---|---|---|
| Pullman Car Company | 89 | Constance | Kitchen First | Originally SER Drawing Room Car No.33, of 1891, becoming a Pullman in 1919. This car was sold to a private owner who had the carriage body cut in two and integrated into a building before being sold to the Bluebell in 1997. The two halves are in good condition and the remains of Constance are currently stored on the underframe of a Bulleid coach. | |
| Pullman Car Company | 157 | Car No. 54. | Brake Third | Built in 1923. Undergoing restoration. Car No. 54 was originally preserved on the Dart Valley Railway before moving to the Birmingham Railway Museum in 1970. It was later sold to Venice-Simplon Orient Express and was stripped at Carnforth before being put aside for sale. This car was purchased in 1984 but did not arrive until 1986. Largely complete, Car No. 54 also contains a large collection of toilet doors from the VSOE Pullmans. The carriage was overhauled 20 years ago but rain seeped into the carriage, ruining a lot of the newly refurbished carriage. It is now being restored under cover with proper materials. | |
| Pullman Car Company | 175 | Fingall | Kitchen First | Built in 1924. Operational. A rebuild of the bogies, wheels and brakes was completed in 2022. | |
| Pullman Car Company | 194 | Car No. 36. | Parlour Third | Built in 1926. The carriage was purchased privately and moved to the Bluebell from the Churnet Valley Railway in late 2019. The carriage will enter the workshops once work on Car No. 54 is complete, with a hope it will replace Christine once the latter becomes due for underframe overhaul in 2022. The carriage was formerly part of the Bulmer's Cider promotional train in the 1970s. | |
| Pullman Car Company | 219 | Car No. 64 | Parlour Third | Built in 1928. Operational. Named Christine by the railway. Formerly part of the Bulmers Cider Pullman set, but sold to the Bluebell by VSOE as it was a third-class car. This coach was overhauled at VSOE's Stewarts Lane workshops in 2004, and returned to service in 2006. Aluminium roof panelling replaced by canvas, following signs of water damage; the canvas has been painted white and the roof furniture re-fitted. | |
| Pullman Car Company | 307 | Carina | Kitchen First | A 1951 'Festival of Britain' Golden Arrow Pullman carriage. Carina was part of Sir Winston Churchill's funeral train in 1965, and was later sold to the Hotel Mercure in Lyon, France before being returned to the UK in the late 1970s by Venice-Simplon Orient Express. She was originally purchased by the Brighton Belle trust, but was swapped for car Doris which was based for a while on the Bluebell. | |
| Compagnie Internationale des Wagons-Lits | 3801 | N/A | First Class Sleeping Car | Built in 1939. Car 3801 was part of the last Night Ferry service in 1980. It was stored at Ostend until 1984 when it was purchased by the Bluebell for use as an accommodation coach at Horsted Keynes. It is somewhat unusual but fits in with the Bluebell as this car was formerly used by the Southern Railway and more latterly British Railways (Southern Region). | |

=== Observation car, Royal and Directors' saloons ===
| Origin | Number | Type | Notes | Photograph |
|---|---|---|---|---|
| GNR | 706 | Directors' Saloon | Built in 1897. In traffic and is used fairly regularly on passenger trains on Bank Holidays and the summer months, as well as at special events. Owned by the Howlden Trust. | |
| LNWR | 1503 | Observation Coach | Built in 1913. Painted in LNWR livery. Operational following a rebuild in 2014. | |
| LBSCR | 60 | Directors' Saloon | Built in 1913. Stored awaiting restoration under a waterproof cover. Work is unlikely to commence for some time with general purpose carriages preferred. | |

== Non-passenger coaching stock ==
The Bluebell has a large collection of wagons which were originally used in passenger trains. This section also includes carriages used for service purposes by the Bluebell that were originally passenger carriages.

=== Pre-grouping vans ===
| Origin | Number | Type | Notes | Photograph |
|---|---|---|---|---|
| LCDR | 1 | Horse Box | Built in 1882. Destroyed by fire in 2010, may be reconstructed at some point in the future | |
| SECR | 153 | Passenger Luggage Van | Built in 1922. Serviceable, but used as mess van. | |
| LBSCR | 270 | Milk / Fruit Van | Built in 1908. Overhaul completed in 2015, restored to as-built condition. This vehicle, hauled by Fenchurch, was the last to arrive on the Bluebell via. the line through Ardingly. New axle holds are needed while the body of 270 is held up inside the new carriage shed's workshop area. | |
| SECR | 719 | Birdcage Brake Van | Built in 1905. Awaiting restoration. Stored in Horsted Keynes' sidings behind the station. | |
| LSWR | 5498 | Ventilated Luggage Van | Built in 1920. Awaiting restoration. | |

=== Southern Railway vans, etc. ===
| Origin | Number | Type | Notes | Photograph |
|---|---|---|---|---|
| SR | C 404 | 4-wheel brake Van | Built in 1937. Operational | |
| SR | C 419 | 4-wheel Brake Van | Built in 1937. Operational | |
| SR | C 442 | 4-Wheel Brake Van | Built in 1937. Dismantled. Converted to generator truck in 1990s for Queen of Scots accommodation, and used on the Bluebell as a passenger brake, it was stored out of use at Kingscote where its condition deteriorated to a point where it became the worst of the Bluebell's 4 vans, it was then taken to Horsted Keynes where its body was broken up, with re-usable parts being stored to help maintain the remaining vans. Its underframe will be used to support the body of South Eastern Railway Saloon No. 172. | |
| SR | 1184 | PLV (Passenger Luggage Van) | Built in 1935. Non operational. Used as a workshop by the S&T Dept. | |
| SR | 1788 | PLV (Passenger Luggage Van) | Built in 1942. Restored and repainted to BR Crimson. | |
| SR | 2186 | PLV (Passenger Luggage Van) | Built in 1934. Nearing the end of repairs. | |
| SR | 2276 | Van U (Covered Carriage Truck) | Built in 1929. Non operational. Used as a workshop for the S&T Dept. | |
| SR | 2462 | GBL (Gangwayed Bogie Luggage van) | Built in 1931. Operational. Currently in use as an art exhibition at the dock platform at Horsted Keynes. | |
| BR | 2531 | CCT (Covered Carriage Truck) | Built in 1955. 2531 has recently been restored to BR Crimson livery. | |
| BR | 4601 | GUV Bogie Scenery Van (modified for carrying circus elephants). | Built in 1949. Undergoing restoration. The vehicle has been converted into a children's play carriage. | |

=== LMS & BR ===
| Origin | Number | Type | Notes | Photograph |
|---|---|---|---|---|
| LMS/BR | 398 | First Sleeper | Built in 1952. Non operational and used as a staff sleeping accommodation. | |
| LMS/BR | 603 | Third Sleeper | Built in 1951. Non operational and used as a staff sleeping accommodation. | |
| LMS/BR | 623 | Third Sleeper | Built in 1952. Non operational and used as a staff sleeping accommodation. | |
| LMS | 32975 | BGZ (6-wheel Gangwayed Guard's Brake, Stove R) | Built in 1938. Used as a combined kitchen and brake vehicle for the Golden Arrow dining train. Has been fitted with shelving for crockery and facilities to keep food warm, and has been repainted from the familiar LMS crimson livery into Pullman chocolate and cream livery to complement the other vehicles in the rake. The work has been done in such a way that the changes can later be reversed, once a further Pullman vehicle has been overhauled to undertake these functions. | The vehicle prior to rebuilding. Repainted into Pullman livery |
| BR | 6334 | BG (Full Brake) | Built in 1957. Non operational and used as a store. | |
| BR | 86722 | Bogie GUV (General Utility Van) | Built in 1959. Went from Stewarts Lane to the Bluebell Railway in January 2009 to be used as a stores van. | |
| BR | 87720 | Insulated Fish Covered Van | Built in 1960. Recently repainted as of 10 June 2019 but still stored in Horsted Keynes sidings. | |
| BR | 94181 | CCT (Covered Carriage Truck) | Built in 1959. Non operational, used as a store by the Howlden Trust at Horsted Keynes. | |
| BR | 10690 | Mark 3 sleeper | Ex-Caledonian Sleeper vehicle displaced by a full fleet upgrade, arriving on the railway in December 2019. To be used as staff accommodation at Sheffield Park. | |
| BR | 10693 | Mark 3 sleeper | Ex-Caledonian Sleeper vehicle displaced by a full fleet upgrade, arriving on the railway in December 2019. To be used as staff accommodation at Sheffield Park. | |

=== Mk. I carriages used for non-traffic purposes ===
| Origin | Number | Type | Notes | Photograph |
|---|---|---|---|---|
| BR | 2442 | Staff Sleeping Coach | Built in 1961. (88 Service Car No.2) Ex-SLC. | |
| BR | 25776 | Staff Dormitory | Built in 1961. (TCL 99166) Ex-SK. | |
| BR | 25871 | Carriage Shop at Horsted Keynes. | Built in 1962. (TCL 99161) Ex-SK. Now in use as a shop at Horsted Keynes platform 4, selling books, model railway items, Thomas the Tank Engine items, etc. | |
| BR | 35419 | Visitor facilities, East Grinstead. | Built in 1963. (BDC 977166) Ex-BSK. Converted to form part of the permanent Bluebell presence in East Grinstead, and now provides both a coffee shop / buffet and travel centre at the station. | |

=== Milk tanks ===
| Origin | Number | Type | Notes | Photograph |
|---|---|---|---|---|
| United Dairies | 4430 | 6-wheel glass-lined Milk Tank | Built in 1933. Operational and used regularly in goods trains, and sometimes in passenger trains. Is through-piped for vacuum braking and carriage heat to enable use in standard passenger workings. | |

== Goods wagons ==
The Bluebell has a large collection of goods wagons. Some are used in demonstration goods trains at various times of the year.

=== Brake vans ===
| Origin | Number | Type | Notes | Photograph |
|---|---|---|---|---|
| LSWR | 5706 | 10 ton "Road Van" Brake Van | Built in 1898. Stored awaiting a major structural restoration. Currently stored at Horsted Keynes | |
| SECR | 11916 | 25 ton "Dance Hall" Brake Van | Built in 1923. Stored at Kingscote, recent cosmetic overhaul carried by Friends of Kingscote however still required major bottom end work | |
| SECR | 11934 | 25 ton "Dance Hall" Brake Van | Undergoing restoration | |
| GWR | 17908 | 20 ton "Toad" Brake Van | Operational, but normally stored at Horsted Keynes. | |
| MoS (SR design) | 49018 | 25 ton "Pillbox" Brake Van | Was built in 1942 for the Ministry of Supply during the Second World War by the Southern Railway. Fitted with Vacuum brake. Later entered BR stock. Soon to receive some cosmetic attention, used mainly on engineers trains. It is intended that this van will revert to its BR identity of M360328. | |
| SR | 55993 | 25 ton "Pillbox" Brake Van | Operational. Built in 1930. | |
| SR | 56290 | 25 ton "Queen Mary" Brake Van | Operational, regularly used with engineering trains and brake van rides. Built in 1936. | |
| BR | 62864 | "Shark" Ballast Plough Brake Van | Stored awaiting restoration. Built in 1949. | |

=== Covered goods vans ===
| Origin | Number | Type | Notes | Photograph |
|---|---|---|---|---|
| LSWR | 2773 | 10 ton Covered Goods Van | Stored awaiting overhaul | |
| LSWR | 8112 | 10 ton Covered Goods Van | Stored awaiting overhaul | |
| LBSCR | 8196 | 6 ton Box Van | In service and used regularly on goods trains | |
| LBSCR | 1590 | 8 ton Box Van | Stored awaiting major restoration. Destroyed in a fire on Friday, 16 July 2010. Its reconstruction with metal frames is possible though even though this practice would've been necessary anyway. | |
| SECR | 15750 | 12 ton Covered Goods Van | Out of service awaiting major structural repairs to all the corner pillars | |
| SR | 44611 | 10 ton Ventilated Van | In service and used regularly on goods trains | |
| SR | 47588 | 12 ton Ventilated Van | In service and used regularly on goods trains | |
| LMS | 524178 | 12 ton Plywood Ventilated Van | Awaiting restoration | |
| LMS | 570027 | Banana Van | Received cosmetic attention between late May 2018 and March 2019. Restored and operational. | |
| BR | B772972 | 12 ton Pallet Van | Stored awaiting restoration | |

=== Open goods wagons ===
| Origin | Number | Type | Notes | Photograph |
|---|---|---|---|---|
| LSWR | 91 | 3, 4 or 5 Plank Open Goods Wagon | Awaiting restoration. Stored at Horsted Keynes beside staff car park. | |
| LBSCR | 3346 | Hi-Bar Open Goods Wagon | Awaiting repairs | |
| SECR | 5542 | 7 Plank Open Goods Wagon | In service and used regularly on goods trains | |
| SECR | 16194 | 7 Plank Open Goods Wagon | In service and used regularly on goods trains. Received repairs and a repaint in 2021. | |
| SECR | 16358 | 7 Plank Open Goods Wagon | Dismantled for major repairs | |
| SECR | 50899 | 5 Plank Open Goods Wagon | Stored awaiting overhaul | |
| SR | 9608 | 5 Plank Open Goods Wagon | Serviceable but rarely used. Currently disguised as S.C.Ruffey from the Thomas & Friends episode, Toad Stands By. | |
| SR | 10013 | 5 Plank Open Goods Wagon | Awaiting overhaul. | |
| SR | 12058 | 5 Plank Open Goods Wagon | Undergoing restoration. | |
| SR | 62002 | 5 Plank Open Goods Wagon | Undergoing overhaul. | |
| SR | 30004 | 8 Plank Open Goods Wagon | In service and used regularly on goods trains. | |
| SR | 37786 | 8 Plank Open Goods Wagon | In service and used regularly on goods trains. | |
| PBA | 59685 | 13 ton Steel Mineral Wagon | Stored awaiting major restoration. | |
| LMS | 66071 | 5 Plank Open Goods Wagon | Stored awaiting restoration | |
| GWR | 87782 | 5 Plank Open Goods Wagon | Stored. | |
| LMS | 411245 | 13 ton open merchandise Wagon | Stored. | |
| LMS | 474558 | 3 Plank Open Goods Wagon | Operational. | |
| LMS | M480222 | 3 Plank Open Goods Wagon | Operational. | |
| BR | B458525 | Steel dropside Open Goods Wagon | In use with the permanent way train. | |
| BR | B461224 | Steel dropside Open Goods Wagon | In use with the permanent way train. | |
| BR | B741381 | "Pipefit" dropside Open Goods Wagon | Stored. | |

=== Flat wagons and bolster wagons ===
| Origin | Number | Type | Notes | Photograph |
|---|---|---|---|---|
| SR | 39617 | Motor Car Truck | Stored at Kingscote. It is hoped that this vehicle can be released for restoration in the near future, subject to workshop space at Horsted Keynes. | |
| SR | 57889 | Bogie Bolster | Undergoing overhaul | |
| SR | 57949 | Bogie Bolster | Operational | |

=== Tank wagons ===
| Origin | Number | Type | Notes | Photograph |
|---|---|---|---|---|
| BP | 4497 | Class A Shell Tank Wagon | Stored awaiting overhaul. | |
| Esso | 1921 | Class B Tank Wagon | Stored. | |
| Shell-BP | 1603 | Class A Tanker | Emergency Water Supply at Kingscote, was the sole supplier of water north of Horsted Keynes until the opening of the East Grinstead station water column in 2015. | |

=== Ballast wagons ===
| Origin | Number | Type | Notes | Photograph |
|---|---|---|---|---|
| SECR | 567 | 2 Plank Ballast Wagon | Operational, and used in demonstration goods trains. Has been constructed based on the identical underframe of an SECR 7-plank wagon, since the Bluebell had 4 of these, but no 2-planks survived into preservation. | |
| SR | 62002 | Dropside Engineers Wagon | Fully restored and used regularly on goods trains | |
| BR | 983103 | Dogfish Ballast Wagon | Operational and used in the engineers train | |
| BR | 984082 | Grampus Engineers Dropside Wagon | Operational and used in the engineers train | |
| BR | 984506 | Grampus Engineers Dropside Wagon | Operational and used in the engineers train | |
| BR | 986419 | Grampus Engineers Dropside Wagon | Operational and used in the engineers train | |
| BR | 986591 | Grampus Engineers Dropside Wagon | Operational and used in the engineers train | |
| BR | 987403 | Grampus Engineers Dropside Wagon | Operational and used in the engineers train | |
| BR | 988395 | Grampus Engineers Dropside Wagon | Operational and used in the engineers train | |
| BR | 991391 | Grampus Engineers Dropside Wagon | Operational and used in the engineers train | |
| BR | 992780 | Dogfish Ballast Wagon | Operational and used in the engineers train | |
| BR | 993210 | Dogfish Ballast Wagon | Operational and used in the engineers train | |
| BR | 993217 | Dogfish Ballast Wagon | Operational and used in the engineers train | |
| BR | 993348 | Dogfish Ballast Wagon | Operational and used in the engineers train | |

=== Cranes and other special use wagons ===
| Origin | Number | Type | Notes | Photograph |
|---|---|---|---|---|
| SR | 61107 | Well wagon | Used to carry engineering vehicles. Eventually planned to have its BR modifications removed. | |
| GWR | 100677 | Sleeper Wagon | Used to carry sleepers | |
| BR | B904134 | Lowmac Machinery Wagon | Operational and used in goods trains | |
| BR | B900036 | Trolley Wagon | Used to carry smaller locomotive boilers | |
| BR | B900920 | Bogie Well Wagon | Used to carry locomotive boilers | |
| LNER | 1083 | Ransome & Rapier Steam Crane | Moved to Horsted Keynes after many years stored out of use, for a start to be made on restoration to operational condition in terms of potential use in trains. Jib runner was recently repainted on 21 October 2018 and a rear section of it is to be taken out because of corrosion and a new section will be made in place. | |
| SR | 1748S | Joseph Booth & Sons Hand Crane | Operational. Was used heavily in the 80's and the early 2000s before "working at height" rules came into force. | |
