= James Connell & Sons =

James Connell & Sons (ca. 1906 - 1930s) was an art gallery business and publisher of etchings in Glasgow and London. It was established by James Hodge Connell (born c. 1834) who retired in 1908, leaving the business to his sons James D. Connell (born 1862), Thomas Connell (born 1864), and David Connell (born 1870). Dealing mainly in etchings and works on paper, artists whose work was sold through the gallery included: Andrew Affleck, Eugene Bejot, David Young Cameron, Hester Frood, Gertrude Ellen Hayes, Henry Rushbury, Nathaniel Sparks, Alfred W. Strutt, Edward Millington Synge, William Walker (engraver), Ernest Herbert Whydale and Mary G. W. Wilson.

The gallery held an exhibition of "London as seen by an Italian", featuring paintings by Piero Sansalvadore.

According to The Antique Dealers Blog, "Connell is well known amongst art historians as a ‘Fine Art’ dealer – one who emerged from the picture frame making trades in the middle decades of the 19th century" and continued in business at least until the 1930s. One of their catalogues was also of porcelain. One of their picture frame labels identifies the firn as having been established in 1862. A correspondence with the firm about two pictures is dated 1943. James Connell's death and a blurb about the firm was included in The Annual Register in 1917.

== History ==
The business was established selling picture frames. It eventually expanded into art. The firm also dealt occasionally in old furniture. The firm was located at several addresses in Glasgow in a 1910 / 1911 directory they were listed under "carvers and gilders.

In the late 19th century the firm dealt in Hague school and Barbizon school paintings at their Glasgow gallery.

== Collections ==
The National Gallery has a correspondence to the firm from 1914. The firm handled a painting by George Lawrence Bulleid.
