= Alan Morgan =

Alan, Allan or Allen Morgan may refer to:

- Alan Morgan (footballer, born 1973), Welsh football player
- Alan Morgan (footballer, born 1983), Scottish football player
- Alan Morgan (politician) (born 1988), South Carolina politician
- Alan Morgan (sailor) (1909–1984), American sailor
- Alan V. Morgan, professor in earth sciences at the University of Waterloo, winner of the E. R. Ward Neale Medal
- Alan Morgan (bishop) (1940–2011), bishop of Sherwood
- Allen Morgan (ornithologist) (1925–1990), American ornithologist
- Allen Morgan (rowing) (1925–2011), American coxswain
- Allen B. Morgan Jr., brokerage founder
- Allen Morgan (priest) (1761–1830), Anglican priest in Ireland
- Allen Morgan (murderer), hailed in 2024 for murdering his wife in 1981

== See also ==
- Al Morgan (disambiguation)
