= Bert Morgan =

Bert Morgan may refer to:

- Bert Morgan (photojournalist) (1904–1986), British-born American photojournalist
- Bert Morgan (cricketer) (1885–1959), English cricketer

== See also ==
- Albert Morgan (disambiguation)
- Robert Morgan (disambiguation)
