= Alfred Morgan =

Alfred Morgan may refer to:

- Alfred Powell Morgan (1889–1972), electrical engineer, inventor, and author
- Stan Morgan (Alfred Stanley Morgan, 1920–1971), Welsh footballer
- Alfred Morgan (footballer) (1879–?), English footballer
- Alfred Morgan (painter) (1836–1924), British painter

== See also ==
- Alf Morgans, fourth Premier of Western Australia
- Al Morgan (disambiguation)
