= SER O class =

Class of 122 two-cylinder locomotives

SER O and O1 Classes
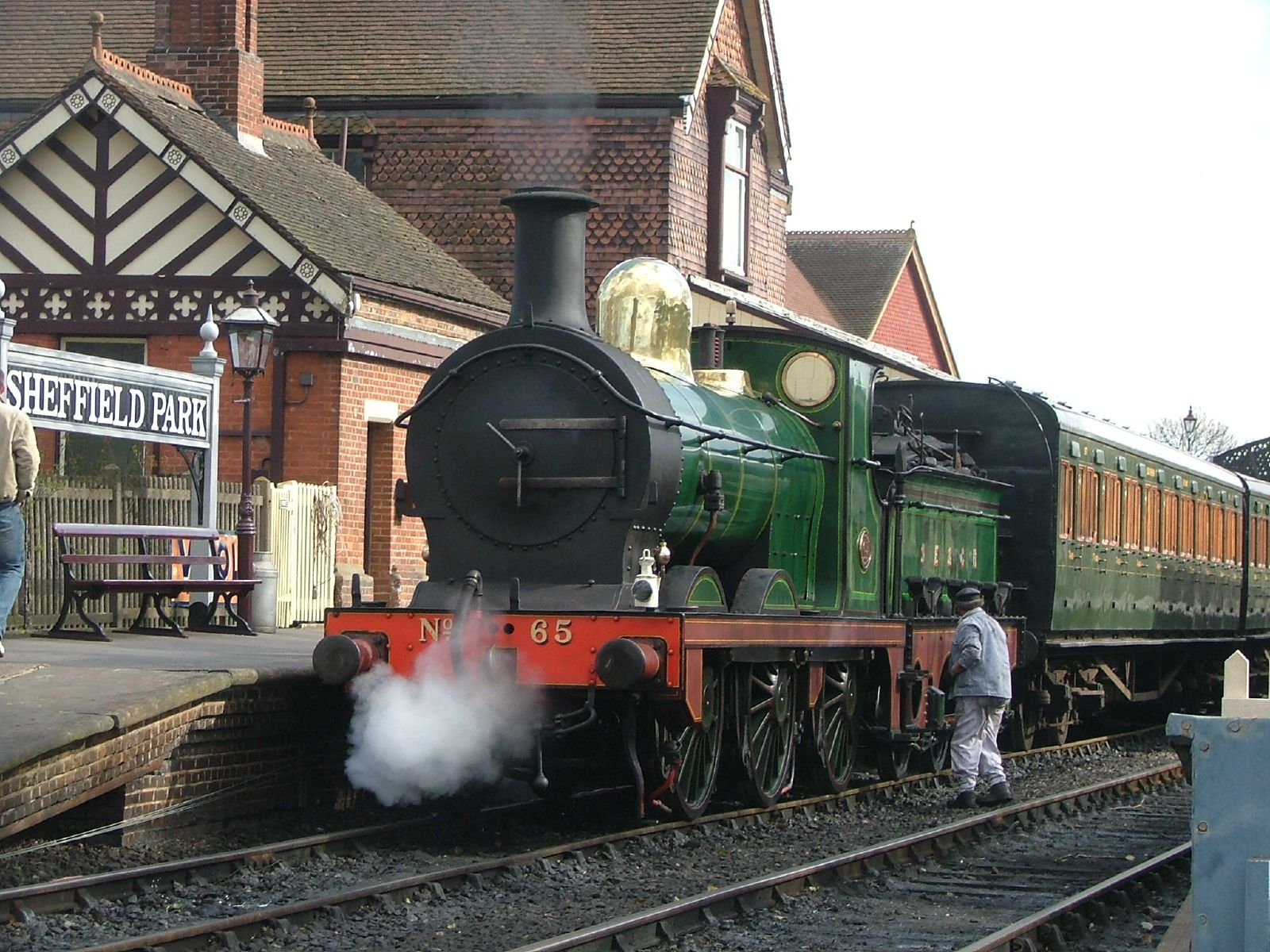
- Preserved No. 65 on the Bluebell Railway in Sussex.
Type and origin
- Power type: Steam
- Designer: James Stirling
- Builder: Ashford Works (57); Sharp, Stewart & Co. (65)
- Build date: 1878–1899
- Total produced: 122
- Rebuild date: 1900–1932
- Number rebuilt: 87
Specifications
- Configuration
  - Whyte: 0-6-0
  - UIC: C n2
- Gauge: 4 ft 8 1/2 in (1,435 mm)
- Driver dia.: 5 ft 2 in (1.575 m)
- Loco weight: 41 long tons 1 cwt (92,000 lb or 41.7 t)
- Fuel type: Coal
- Fuel capacity: 2 long tons 15 cwt (6,200 lb or 2.8 t)
- Water cap.: 2,000 imp gal (9,100 L; 2,400 US gal)
- Boiler pressure: 150 lbf/in^{2} (1.03 MPa)
- Cylinders: Two, inside
- Cylinder size: 18 in × 26 in (457 mm × 660 mm)
- Valve gear: Stephenson
Performance figures
- Tractive effort: 17,300 lbf (76.95 kN)
Career
- Operators: South Eastern Railway; → South Eastern and Chatham Railway; → Southern Railway; → British Railways
- Class: O and O1
- Locale: Southern Region
- Retired: O: 1923–1932; O1: 1923–1961
- Disposition: 58 rebuilt to O1 class (one preserved), remainder scrapped.

The South Eastern Railway (SER) O Class (some of which were later rebuilt, becoming the O1 Class) was a class of 0-6-0 steam locomotive designed for goods work, and were the main goods engines of the SER, and later the South Eastern and Chatham Railway (SECR) for a number of years. However, they were displaced by the more powerful C class locomotives following the amalgamation of the South Eastern Railway and London, Chatham and Dover Railway (LCDR) in 1899. This relegated the class to working on the numerous branch lines in Kent, on both passenger and goods work. They worked most notably on the Kent & East Sussex Railway and East Kent Railway, operating coal trains from the Kent coal fields to London, as well as shunting work at such locations as Shepherds Well, Hoo Junction and Ashford. The majority were withdrawn before the outbreak of the Second World War in 1939, and those that remained were slowly withdrawn from nationalisation onwards.

The death knell for the final few members of the class came with the Modernisation Plan of 1955, which closed down many of the branch lines they continued to serve in Kent, which included the branch lines to locations such as Hawkhurst, New Romney, Tenterden and the Kent coal fields. Those lines which remained open generally either lost their goods services or were dieselised. All members of the class had been withdrawn by 1962, and only one member of the class has survived scrapping.

== Construction ==
122 locomotives of the O class were built between 1878 and 1899, the last five entering service after the SER locomotive stock had been pooled with that of the LCDR to form the SECR. Sharp, Stewart and Company received four orders totalling 65:

Order no.	Works nos.	New	Running nos.	Total
E758	2796–2807, 2810–7	October 1878–April 1879	279–298	20
E984	3711–20	August–September 1891	369–378	10
E1024	3946–65	September–December 1893	379–398	20
E1100	4302–16	August–October 1897	425–39	15

The balance (57 locomotives) were built at Ashford Works between 1882 and 1899, their numbers being scattered between 1 and 258, plus 299–301, 314–8, 331–4.

== Rebuilding ==
28 of the O class locomotives were given replacement boilers between 1900 and 1923, of basically similar dimensions to the originals; however, the fireboxes were deeper, and so the boiler was mounted higher in the frames.

Between 1903 and 1932, 59 locomotives were given larger boilers, of the same type as was fitted to the SECR H class 0-4-4T; these rebuilds were designated the O1 class.

== Withdrawal ==
Table of withdrawals
Year	Quantity in service at start of year	Quantity withdrawn	Locomotive numbers	Notes
1906	122	1	317	
1908	121	3	208/97, 315	
1909	118	7	279/87, 291/93–95/98	
1910	111	4	55, 120, 290/99	
1911	107	7	122, 284–86/88/96, 301	
1912	100	7	121/31, 282/83/89/92, 318	282 first O1 withdrawn
1913	93	3	207, 331/34	
1914	90	3	281, 300/14	
1923	87	3	A171, A332, A372	A372 was O1 class; sold to EKLR no. 6
1924	84	2	A375, A382	
1925	82	6	A1, A15, 119, A144, A254, A392	O1: A119
1926	76	9	A96, A100/42, A333/87/93–94, A427/31	O1: A393
1927	67	4	A52, A99, A170, A435	
1928	63	4	A8, A167, A376, A433	sold to EKLR no. 8
1929	59	3	A49, A98, A111	
1932	56	1	A436	Last O class to be withdrawn
1935	55	1	A383	sold to EKLR no. 100
1944	54	1	1371	sold to EKLR no. 1371
1946	53	1	1251	
1948	52	(3)	EKLR 2 (ex-100), 6, 1371 absorbed	EKLR 8 withdrawn 1935
1948	55	11	1014/46/51, 31378, 1386/88/96–97, 1426/37–38	
1949	44	19	1003/07/39/80, 1106/09, 1238, 1316/74/80/84–85/89/98, 1428–29/39, EKLR 6	
1950	25	2	1123, 1377	
1951	23	15	1041/44/66/93, 1108, 31248, 1369/71, S1373, 1379/81, 31383, 1390–91/95/32	
1958	8	1	31064	
1959	7	3	31425/30/34	
1960	4	2	31048, 31370	
1961	2	2	31065, 31258	

== Preservation ==
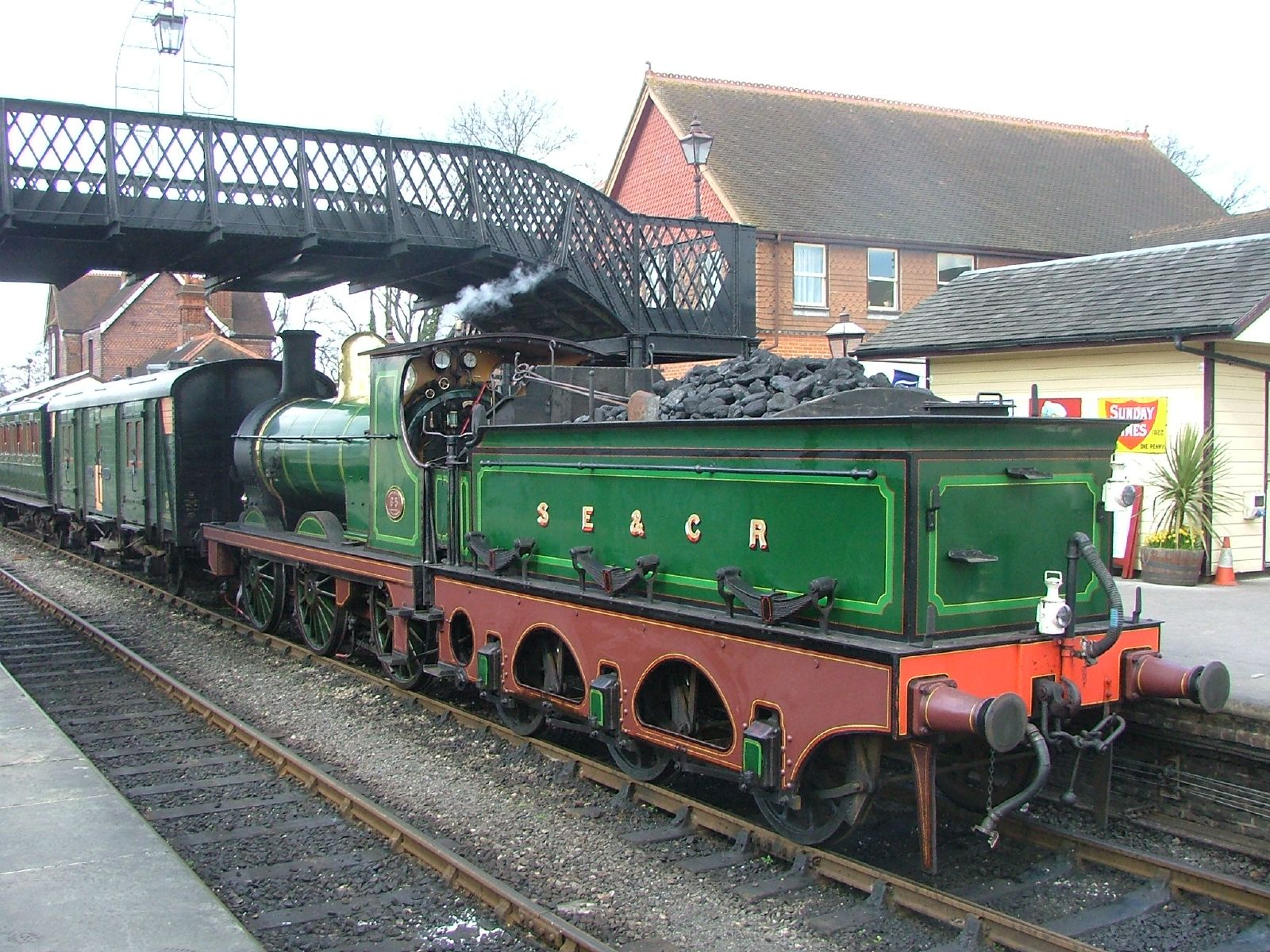
Rear view showing tender

One O1 class, SECR No. 65 (SR Nos. A65 and 1065, BR No. 31065) has been preserved, and is currently based on the Bluebell Railway in Sussex.

=== Pre-preservation history ===
No. 65 was originally built for the South Eastern Railway (SER) at Ashford railway works in 1896, and is the only surviving former SER locomotive. It was rebuilt in 1908, also at Ashford, into a form reminiscent of the more modern SECR C class. The engine was withdrawn by British Railways in 1961, its major claim to fame being the working of the last railtour to run over the Hawkhurst branch in Kent, along with C class No. 31592, also preserved at the Bluebell Railway. It was also a regular operator over the Kent & East Sussex Railway during the last decade of that line's operational lifespan. The engine went on to haul demolition trains.

Within a month of operating the special over the Hawkhurst branch, the engine was withdrawn from general traffic by British Railways and was moved to Ashford Works. The locomotive was used to train apprentices in the works and was discovered by Esmond Lewis-Evans while he was back visiting from his home in Rhodesia. He purchased the locomotive, however, before it was moved the locomotive's coupling rods were cut, they were subsequently repaired at the works prior to the locomotive's move into preservation.

=== Preservation (1963-1996) ===
Following withdrawal the engine was purchased by Mr Lewis-Evans in 1963 for the scrap value of £850. It was moved from Ashford Works to the Ashford Steam Centre, based in the former Ashford Motive Power Depot in Kent. There, the engine worked during open days along with the former 31592 and H class tank no. 31263, both now also Bluebell Railway residents.

As well as the steam engines, the centre played host to a number of other vehicles, including 'Clan Line' and 'Sir Lamiel' as well as Pullman cars Aubrey, Sapphire, Phyliss and Lucille – three of which were to go on to join the VSOE pullman train fleet. When the site closed most of these vehicles were dispersed. To avoid repossession by British Rail for non-payment of rent on the Ashford Steam Centre, 31065 was dismantled and dispersed to sites around Kent; the frames and tender went to Essex.

=== Preservation (1996 onwards) ===
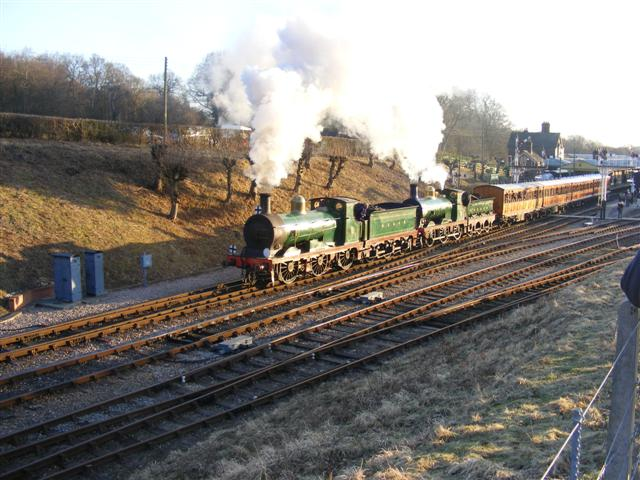
65, led by 592, operating in February 2009

During the late summer of 1996, the owner of the engine visited the Bluebell to inspect the facilities available at Sheffield Park with a view to restoring the engine properly. The rolling chassis arrived soon afterwards, and was followed by several of the other constituent parts of the engine, including the boiler, during the following months. With the impending centenary of the SECR due in 1999, work started swiftly on restoring the engine to traffic. A major overhaul ensued, as the engine had not received major work since before its withdrawal in 1961, and had been the victim of being stored outside.

The engine was returned to traffic for the centenary of the amalgamation of the SER and LCDR into the SECR in 1999, and was finished in the ornate SECR goods livery, the same livery carried by C class no. 592, which had been a regular performer at the railway since its arrival in the 1970s. The two engines briefly ran together, with many photographic charters bringing the two together on a regular basis. This lasted until the C class' boiler ticket expired in 2000, and following the retirement of the P class tank also operational (No. 323 Bluebell), the now-numbered 65 briefly became the sole operational ex-SECR engine in the world, until the restoration of another P class tank at the Kent & East Sussex Railway in 2001. It remained the only operational ex-SECR engine at the Bluebell Railway until the restoration to traffic of 592 in the summer of 2007.

The engine has performed regularly at the Bluebell Railway since its overhaul, often to be found operating the line's vintage trains, which is often formed of ex-SECR carriages. In May 2009 the engine made a historic return to the K&ESR, having been a regular on the line during the 1950s, including working some of the demolition trains. This was the first time since its arrival that the engine had left the Bluebell, although a previous visit to the Mid Hants Railway for a gala appearance in 2007 had been planned, but was cancelled owing to a failure. Despite this, it has been a reliable and regular performer, popular with both crews and passengers alike.

The engine's boiler certificate expired in July 2009, but owing to the amount of work done during the last overhaul, it is not thought to require much work to restore it, and is likely to be boosted by the recent return of 592 and P class tanks nos. 178, 323 and H class 263, thus creating the potential for five ex-SECR engines to be operational together for the first time since the 1960s.

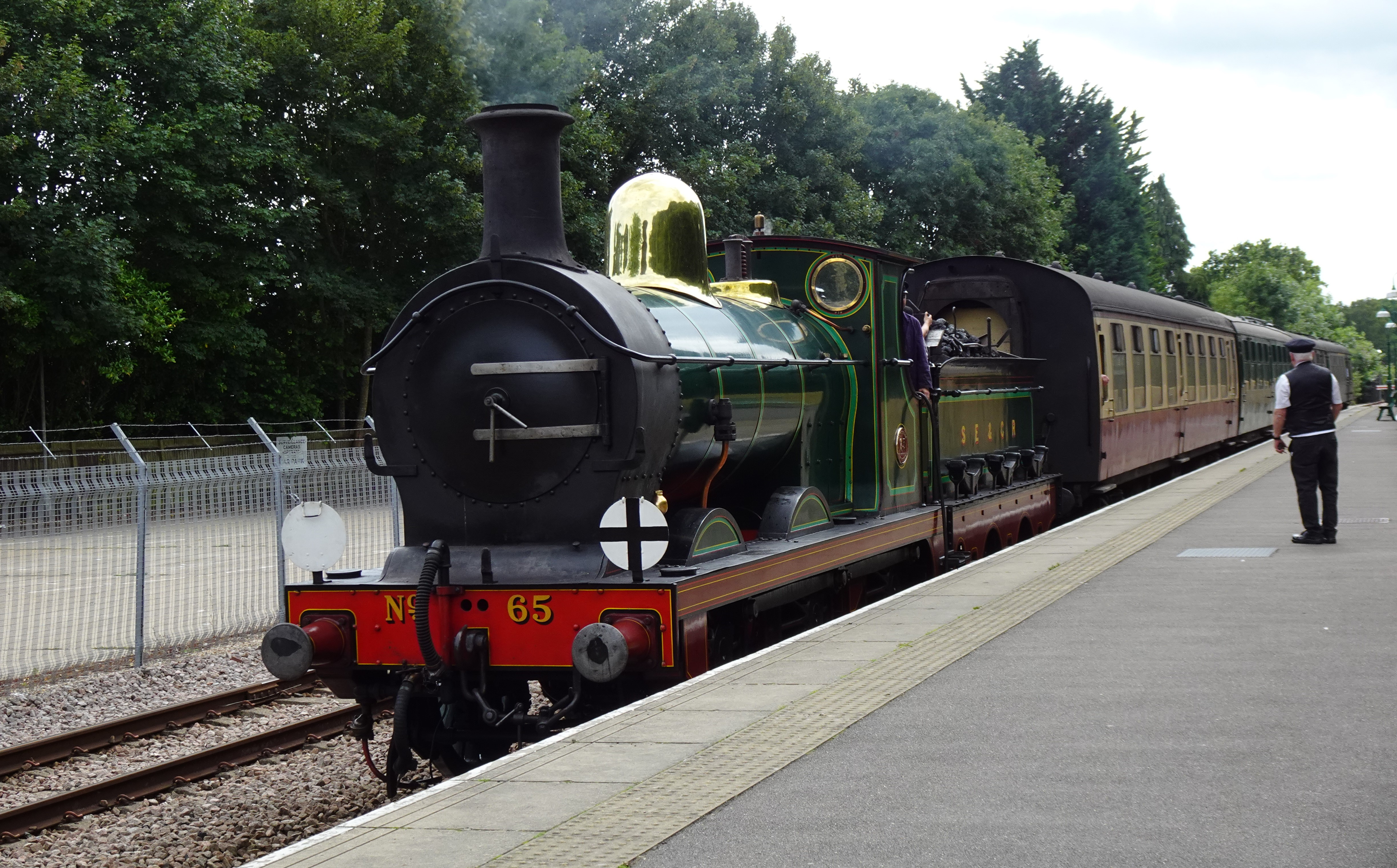
No. 65 entering East Grinstead railway station, July 2023.

A spare SECR R1 boiler was sent away in 2013 for overhaul, and once completed was put onto No. 65. The spare boiler was used since it meant that the locomotive did not have to be dismantled until it entered the works for the mechanical work required in 2016. The frames were moved into the Bluebell's workshop at Sheffield Park in 2016 for work to commence on the rest of the locomotive. The overhaul was completed in 2017 and the locomotive is available for service once again.

In December 2021 ownership of the locomotive passed to the Bluebell Railway Trust.

== Sources ==
- Bradley, D.L. (September 1985) [1963]. The Locomotive History of the South Eastern Railway (2nd ed.). London: RCTS. ISBN 0-901115-48-7.
- Casserley, H.C. (1968). Preserved Locomotives. Ian Allan.
- "Profile of O1 Class No.65". Bluebell Railway.
- "Classes O/O1". Southern E-Group. 18 June 2011.
- "The Bluebell Railway's Locomotives". Bluebell Railway.
