= Al Morgan =

Al Morgan may refer to:

- Al Morgan (writer) (1920–2011), American television producer and novelist
- Al Morgan (bassist) (1908–1974), American jazz musician
- Al Morgan (pianist) (1915–1989), American pianist and songwriter and star of The Al Morgan Show

== See also ==
- Albert Morgan (disambiguation)
- Alex Morgan (disambiguation)
- Alfred Morgan (disambiguation)
- Alan Morgan (disambiguation)
