= Robert Morgan Educational Center =

Robert Morgan Senior High

Location
- 18180 SW 122ND AVE; Miami, Florida 33177; U.S.
- 25°35′57″N 80°23′25″W

Information
- Type: Public secondary
- Motto: Occasus nostrum vela ut excellentia: Setting our Sails to Excellence
- Established: August 2002
- School district: Miami-Dade County Public Schools
- Principal: Blanco
- Teaching staff: 76.00 (FTE)
- Grades: 9–12
- Enrollment: 1,845 (2022–2023)
- Student to teacher ratio: 24.28
- Campus: Suburban
- Colors: Burgundy and Gold
- Mascot: Pirate
- School hours: 7:20 AM to 2:20 PM
- Average class size: 32

Robert Morgan Senior High (RMSH) is a secondary school located at 18180 SW 122nd Avenue in Miami, Florida. As a magnet school, Robert Morgan is a juxtaposition of a vocational training and classical learning environment that is unique to other schools in its region. In April 2007, the school received regional accreditation by the Southern Association of Colleges and Schools.

== Curriculum and the Academies ==
=== Academies ===
==== Academy of Hospitality & Tourism ====
The Academy of Hospitality & Tourism (AOHT) prepares students for hospitality and tourism careers with a focus on business marketing and management. AOHT is affiliated with the National Academy Foundation; DECA, an Association of Marketing Students; and the American Hotel and Lodging Association. The program provides training for entry-level management positions in lodging, food service, time travel, tourism, and sporting/entertainment events.

==== Design Arts & Entertainment ====
- 3D Animation Technology
- Commercial Art Technology
- TV Production

Students in the Design Arts & Entertainment Academy are involved in multimedia activities such as live broadcasting, commercial art, and graphic animation. Hands-on experience prepares students for careers in design arts and television. WRMN8 (TV production) is the school's news station.

==== Engineering ====
- Engineering Technology

The Engineering Academy presents technology in the fields of engineering and architecture. Students with an interest in math and science have the opportunity to develop and showcase their talents and abilities through this academy.

==== Health Sciences ====
- Medical Services (including Dental Aide, Medical Assisting, Nursing, Physical Therapy, and Sports Medicine)
- Veterinary Assisting

The Health Sciences Academy offers a multitude of programs designed to meet the interests of any student interested in pursuing a career in medicine. The programs are designed to fulfill predicted critical shortage areas in the health services industry. Modern equipment, school site working labs, and high level math and science courses provide students with a background to meet today’s medical needs.

==== Information Technology & Business Services ====
- Computer Electronics Technology
- International Business

Information Technology & Business Services students will be eligible for the latest certification in Cisco networking and computer hardware systems, such as A+ certification. Students may choose from fields such as Computer Electronics Technology and International Business.

==== Performing, Recording, & Visual Arts ====
- Band (music for stage and screen)
- Chorus
- Dance
- Theatre Arts
- Piano
- Sound & Recording Engineering
- Strings (Orchestra)
- Visual Arts

Students enrolled in this academy have the opportunity to acquire knowledge in the rapidly growing area of arts and entertainment. This academy is geared towards live stage performance and the performing arts.

==== Specialty Service Industries ====
- Cosmetology
- Culinary Arts
- Early Childhood Education

The Specialty Service Industries Academy covers three diverse strands that have been identified as growth areas in the 21st century. It offers rigorous curriculum in cosmetology, culinary arts, and early childhood education, and provides students opportunities for success in these service industries.

==== Technical Career Services ====
- Air Conditioning, Refrigeration, and Major Appliance Technology
- Automotive Youth Education Systems

The School-to-Career Initiative is exemplified in the Technical Career Services Academy. Students are given hands-on experience with the mechanical and technological aspects of careers in each strand.

== Demographics ==
Robert Morgan is 72% Hispanic/Latino, 20% Black/African American, 7% White and 1% Asian.

== See also ==
- Education in the United States
- Robert Morgan (disambiguation)
