= Piero Sansalvadore =

Italian painter

- Born: April 7, 1892; Turin, Italy
- Died: July 29, 1955 (aged 63); Turin, Italy
- Occupation: Artist

Piero Sansalvadore (born Turin, 7 April 1892; died Turin, 27 July 1955) was an Italian-born musician, writer, and artist who became a British citizen.

== Biography ==
=== Early life ===
Little is known about Sansalvadore's early life. He started to learn the violin at the age of 7 years and when he was 17, began to compose music. A composition for violin and piano is recorded in the Italian National Library.

=== First World War and inter-war period ===
Sansalvadore fought during World War I and was injured in the head and legs. While he was recovering from a nervous breakdown after the war he started to paint, which became his vocation. In 1928 he transferred his studio from Turin to Venice; in 1930, he visited London for an exhibition of his paintings at the Claridge Gallery and remained in England. There he developed a different technique of painting: applying paint directly to small panels of bare wood with a palette knife.

Between 1930 and 1933 he spent time in Glasgow and Edinburgh and his paintings of Scotland were shown at the M'Lure Gallery in 1932 and at the gallery of James Connell in Glasgow in May 1934. Examples of his etchings were reproduced in Fine Prints of the Year in 1932 and 1933. He also held an exhibition of paintings at the Fine Art Society in London in December 1938, and four of his pictures of the Silver Jubilee celebrations were bought by Queen Mary, the wife of King George V.

Soon after he arrived in England Sansalvadore found a house and studio in London, on Peel Street in Notting Hill Gate, and lived there for the rest of his life. After seeing Segovia play at the Wigmore Hall he learned to play the guitar and started to collect instruments. He was a member of the Philharmonic Society of Guitarists.

=== Second World War and post-war period ===
During the Second World War Sansalvadore joined the BBC and worked in the Italian Section, which broadcast recordings of him playing the guitar. During the war he became a naturalised British citizen. After the war Sansalvadore held exhibitions of views of London and the Cinque Ports at the Parsons Gallery in London in 1951 and 1953. The pictures sold in 1953 were for the benefit of the Save the Children Fund.

=== Death ===
Piero Sansalvadore died suddenly of a heart attack in July 1955 during a visit to Turin to arrange an exhibition of his work.

== Works ==
He was the author of at least one novel, published in 1918. Examples of his paintings are held in the collections of The Guildhall Art Gallery, London; the Hunterian Art Gallery, University of Glasgow; and the Museum of London, and can be seen on Art UK.
