= Hester Frood =

British painter and printmaker (1882–1971)

Hester Frood (1882–1971) was a painter and printmaker born in New Zealand. She came to England as a child of seven and was educated at Exeter School. She studied art at Académie Colarossi in Paris. In 1906 she met artist David Young Cameron in Scotland and he taught her etching.

Her mother, Mary Frood was heavily involved in the suffrage cause, and in 1913 Hester and her sister Constance carried the Topsham banner on the NUWSS Great Pilgrimage.

Frood exhibited at the Royal Academy, the Royal Scottish Academy and had her first one-man show at Colnaghi in 1925. Her work was also sold by James Connell & Sons, a publisher of etchings in Glasgow and London.

In 1927 Frood was married to poet Frank Gwynne-Evans and they lived on The Strand Topsham, Devon. Her work is in the V&A, the Scottish National Gallery of Modern Art and the British Museum.

Frood died in Essex in 1971 and is buried in Topsham cemetery.
