= Robert Morgan =

Robert or Rob Morgan may refer to:

== Arts and entertainment ==
- Rob Morgan (actor) (born 1973), American actor
- Rob Morgan (fl. 1984–present), founder and lead vocalist of The Squirrels
- Robert Morgan (actor), Australian actor
- Robert Morgan (filmmaker) (born 1974), British filmmaker
- Robert Morgan (writer) (born 1944), American poet, short story writer and novelist
- Robert Morgan, Australian arts administrator, chair of government arts funding body Creative Australia
- Robert W. Morgan (1937–1998), American disc jockey and Radio Hall of Famer
- Robert C. Morgan (1943–2024), American art critic, author, and artist
- Robert Huw Morgan (born 1967), Welsh-born organist and choral conductor
- S. Robert Morgan, American television actor

=== Fictional characters ===
- Rob Morgan, a character played by Mark Lewis Jones in the Welsh 2012–2017 comedy drama series Stella

== Politics and law ==
- Robert J. Morgan (1826–1899), American lawyer, planter and Confederate veteran
- Robert Morgan (British politician) (1880–1960), British Conservative Party politician
- Robert Dale Morgan (1912–2002), U.S. federal judge
- Robert Burren Morgan (1925–2016), U.S. Senator from North Carolina
- Robert Lewis Morgan (born 1952), American politician, member of the New Jersey General Assembly
- Robert Nesta Morgan (born 1981), Jamaican politician

== Sport ==
- Robert Morgan (diver) (born 1967), Welsh diver
- Rob Morgan (racing driver) (born 1973), American racing driver
- Robert Morgan (rugby union) (1941–1999), Welsh rugby player

== Others ==
- Robert Morgan (bishop) (1608–1673), Welsh bishop of Bangor
- Robert Morgan (ironmaster) (1707–1777), Welsh ironmaster
- Robert Clark Morgan (1798–1864), English sea captain
- Robert K. Morgan (1918–2004), U.S. Air Force colonel and pilot, commander of Memphis Belle

== See also ==
- Bob Morgan (disambiguation), for people named Bob or Bobby Morgan
- Bert Morgan (disambiguation)
- Robert Morgan Evans (1783–1844), Indiana politician
