= Bulleid =

Bulleid is a surname. Notable people with the surname include:

- Arthur Bulleid (1862–1951), British antiquarian
- George Lawrence Bulleid (1858–1933), British painter
- Oliver Bulleid (1882–1970), British railway and mechanical engineer
