= Morgan Alexander =

Morgan Alexander may refer to:

- Morgan Alexander (bobsleigh) (born 1982), Canadian bobsledder
- Morgan Alexander (racing driver) (born 1997), American professional dirt track racing and stock car racing driver

== See also ==
- Alexander Morgan (disambiguation)
