= Alfred Morgan (painter) =

British painter

Alfred Morgan (1836 - 1924) was a British painter. His three children also became artists. Several of Morgan's artworks are at the Victoria and Albert Museum including framed paintings as well as murals decorating the museum's architecture.

Morgan painted a portrait of Inigo Jones that was the basis for a mosaic at what was then the South Kensington Museum, one of 35 mosaic depictions of famous artists at the museum's South Court. Several of his works were part of the International Health Exhibition of 1884.

Morgan studied at South Kensington School of Art. He exhibited at the Royal Academy and produced still lifes, genre pictures, portraits, landscape paintings, paintings of historical and scriptural subjects, and murals such as a lunette painting at the South Kennsington Museum.

His sons were Alfred Kedington Morgan (23 July 1868 - 14 April 1828), Owen Baxter Morgan (9 April 1873 - 29 August 1920) and daughter Ethel Mahala Morgan (5 September 1875 – 22 December 1926). His eldest was a master at Rugby School and married fellow artist Gertrude Ellen Hayes.
