= Alexander Morgan =

Alexander Morgan may refer to:

- Alexander Morgan (cricketer) (born 1959), Jamaican
- Alexander Morgan (cyclist) (born 1994), Australian
- Alexander Morgan (mathematician) (1860–1946), Scottish

== See also ==
- Alex Morgan (disambiguation)
- Morgan Alexander (disambiguation)
