= Bob Morgan =

Bob or Bobby Morgan may refer to:

- Bob Morgan (baseball) (born 1947), American baseball player and coach
- Bobby Morgan (baseball) (1926–2023), American baseball infielder
- Bob Morgan (diver) (born 1967), Welsh diver
- Bob Morgan (gridiron football) (1930–1991), American football offensive tackle
- Bob Morgan (priest) (1928–2011), Church in Wales vicar and Welsh Labour council leader
- Bobby Morgan (Canadian football) (born 1940), running back
- Bob Morgan (Illinois politician), member of the Illinois House of Representatives
- Bob Morgan (costume designer), American costume designer

== See also ==
- Robert Morgan (disambiguation)
