= Albert Morgan (disambiguation) =

Albert T. Morgan (died 1922) was an American Civil War soldier and Reconstruction-era politician.

Albert Morgan may also refer to:

- Tod Morgan (Albert Morgan Pilkington, 1902–1953), American boxer
- Al Morgan (bassist) (1908–1974), American jazz musician
- Albert Morgan, character in 1958 American television film The Fountain of Youth

== See also ==
- Bert Morgan (disambiguation)
- Al Morgan (disambiguation)
