= Alex Morgan (disambiguation) =

Alex Morgan (born 1989) is an American soccer player.

Alex Morgan may also refer to:

- Alex Morgan (Australian footballer) (born 1996), Australian rules footballer
- Alex Morgan (runner) (born 1972), Jamaican middle-distance runner

== See also ==
- Alec Morgan (1908–1957), Australian rules footballer
- Alexander Morgan (disambiguation)
