= Bert Morgan (photojournalist) =

American photojournalist (1904–1986)

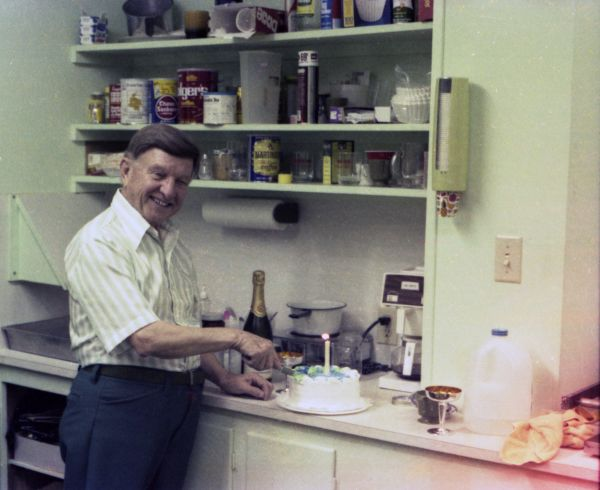
- Morgan in 1978
- Born: Bernard Stanley Morgan; April 4, 1904; Windermere, England
- Died: September 19, 1986 (aged 82); West Palm Beach, Florida, U.S.

Bernard Stanley "Bert" Morgan (April 4, 1904 – September 19, 1986) was a British-born American photojournalist who covered the world of high society in Manhattan, Long Island, Saratoga, Palm Beach, Newport, and points in between from the 1930s to the 1980s. Morgan was born in England in 1904 and moved to the United States with his family at age seven. He died in 1986.

His dog photography was showcased in an exhibition at Wessel + O'Connor Fine Art in early 2006, and an exhibit of his works, Southampton Blue Book, 1930 to 1960: Photographs by Bert Morgan, which was based on a book of the same name drawn from the photographs he took of notable Hamptons residents, was shown at the Southampton Historical Museum in 2014. He was the first person known to take a photograph of Jackie Bouvier.

== Career ==
Bert Morgan began his photography career at age fifteen as a syndication salesman for the Chicago Tribune and the New York Daily News. He began working as a full-time freelance photographer in 1930, specializing in high society events including weddings, polo matches, horse shows, private parties and charity balls. His career ultimately spanned more than fifty years and an archive of his negatives is held by New-York Historical Society.
