= Murder of Carol Morgan =

1981 murder in England

In August 1981, Carol Morgan was murdered by an unknown assailant at the grocery shop she ran with her husband in Linslade, Bedfordshire; the shop was also robbed.

After initial arrests in November 2019, in July 2024 her husband Allen Morgan was jailed for life (with a minimum of 22 years) for hiring a hitman to murder his wife.

The murder and subsequent investigation into the crime was the subject of a 2025 ITV documentary The Real Unforgotten, which moved to Netflix in 2026.
