= Alfred Morgan (footballer) =

English footballer

Personal information
- Full name: Alfred Robert Morgan
- Date of birth: 1879
- Place of birth: Caistor, England
- Position: Centre-half

Senior career*
Years	Team	Apps	(Gls)
1899–1900	St Andrews		
1900–1901	Humber Trinity		
1901–1902	Grimsby All Saints		
1902	Grimsby Town	1	(0)
1903–1904	Grimsby All Saints		
1904–190?	Grimsby Rangers		
- * Club domestic league appearances and goals

Alfred Robert Morgan (born 1879) was an English professional footballer who played as a centre-half.
