= Allen Morgan (priest) =

Irish Anglican priest (1761–1830)

Allen Morgan (8 July 1761 – 7 August 1830) was an Anglican priest in Ireland in the nineteenth century.

Morgan was born in Dublin and educated at Trinity College Dublin. He was Dean of Killaloe from 1828 until his death.
