= Bert Morgan (cricketer) =

English cricketer

Bertie Francis Morgan (6 December 1885 – 25 February 1959) played first-class cricket for Somerset in 1909 and 1910. He was born at Finsbury Park, London and died at Billingham, County Durham.

Morgan was a lower-order right-handed batsman and a left-arm bowler of unknown style. He played for Somerset in one match in 1909 and returned for five more in 1910, with limited success. Primarily a bowler, he actually bowled in only four matches and took just two wickets; his highest score as a batsman came in his final game, against Sussex when he made 23 as Somerset subsided to a heavy defeat.
