= Robert Morgan (rugby union) =

Wales international rugby union player (1941–1999)

- Full name: David Robert Ruskin Morgan
- Born: 29 August 1941 Pontyberem, Wales
- Died: 19 September 1999 (aged 58) Bishopston, Swansea, Wales
- School: Gwendraeth Grammar School

Rugby union career
- Position: Wing
International career
Years	Team	Apps	(Points)
1962–63	Wales	9	(0)

David Robert Ruskin Morgan (29 August 1941 — 19 September 1999) was a Welsh international rugby union player.

Born in Pontyberem, Morgan was educated at Gwendraeth Grammar School and Cardiff College of Education.

Morgan, a winger, played his rugby for Pontyberem, Llanelli and Cardiff, while winning nine Wales caps. He appeared in all of Wales's 1962 and 1963 Five Nations fixtures, as well as a 1963 match against the All Blacks in Cardiff.

== See also ==
- List of Wales national rugby union players
