= The Travelling College =

British train converted for educational use

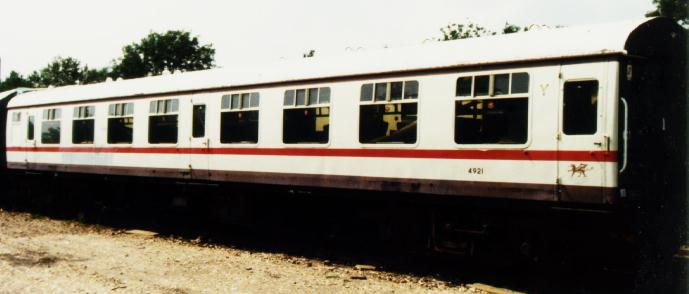
TCL 99171 (TSO 4921) in Travelling College Livery on the Bluebell Railway (Richard Salmon)

The Travelling College ('Y Coleg Ar Y Cledrau') was a specially converted train operated on the British Rail network. The train was designed by Barrie Masterton, with the twelve dedicated coaches being converted at the Cardiff Cathays works. The Travelling College was the only train of its kind in the World, with provision for up to 160 students.

The train was finished in cream with chocolate brown and red bands, along with white roofs. It was operated under a contract with the InterCity Charter section and based at Old Oak Common TMD. The entire train was withdrawn and purchased by the Bluebell Railway in 1993.

== Concept ==
With the launch of the GCSE examinations requiring a considerable amount of learning to take place outside of the classroom it was hoped that the Travelling College would provide means for the classroom and associated accommodation to be taken to suitable locations, essentially creating a mobile field study centre. The service was launched by the Princess of Wales on 2 May 1989, with a brass plaque being unveiled in saloon TCL991868. In the event, however, government legislation on course organisation and funding of external activities meant that the college was not available for the majority of state schools.

== Rolling stock ==
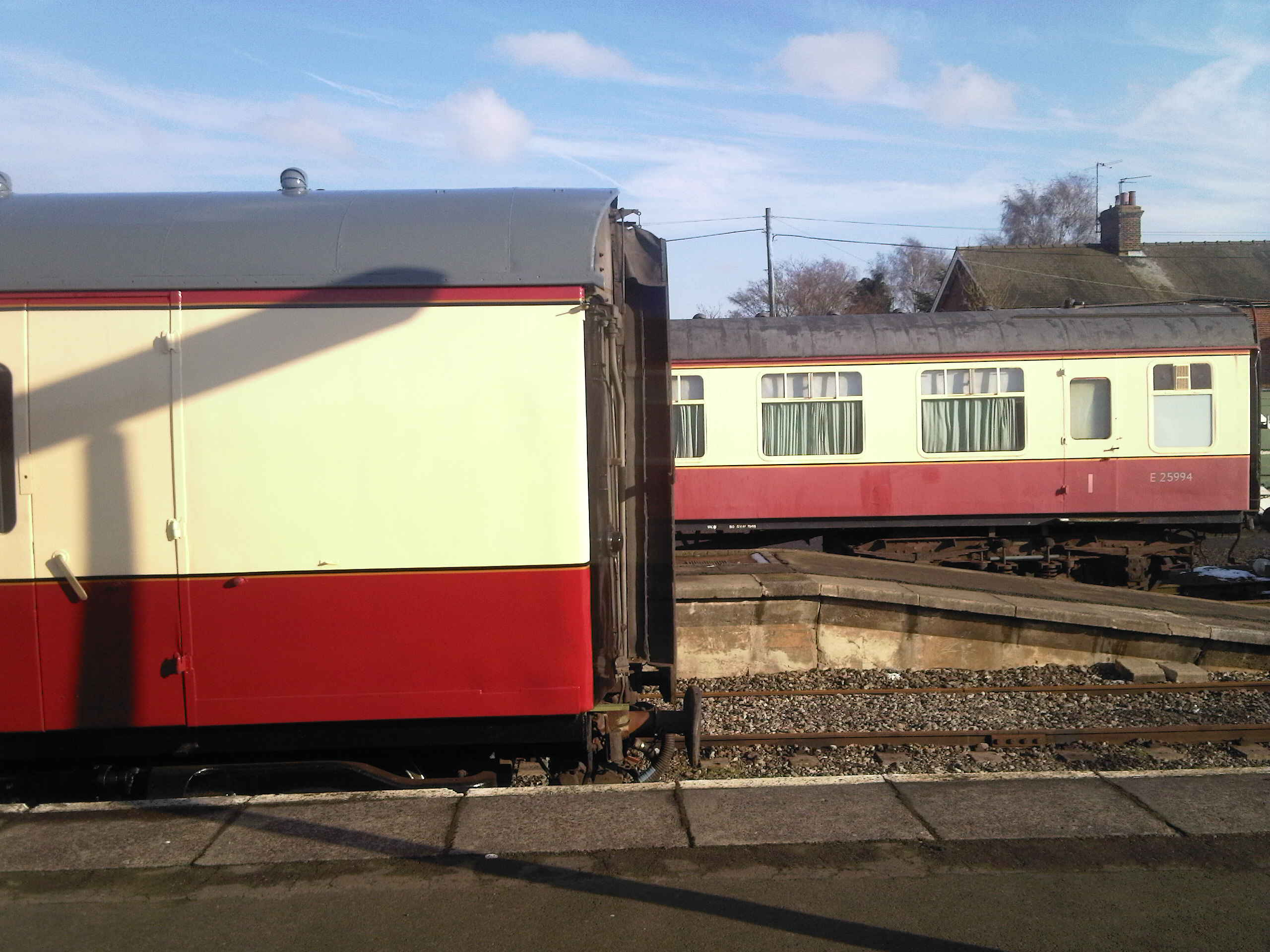
BG 95228 and ex-Travelling College dormitory coach 99163 at Dereham

Twelve British Railways Mark1 coaches were converted for use on the train. Six were converted to serve as dormitory coaches, two staff coaches, three classrooms and one meeting coach. An additional standard restaurant car was provided. The dedicated vehicles were stripped internally, fitted with improved fireproofing and Commonwealth bogies, raising their weight from 34 tonnes to 42 tonnes. The meeting coach was fitted with an onboard banking facility by Midland Bank.

=== Dormitory coaches ===
- TCL99160 (18856) – preserved at The Transport Museum, Wythall, but now scrapped
- TCL99161 (18871) – now converted as shop, Bluebell Railway,
- TCL99162 (18795) – preserved at The Transport Museum, Wythall, but now scrapped
- TCL99163 (19994) – now staff dormitory, using TCL bunks, Mid-Norfolk Railway.
- TCL99164 (25853) – now converted as visitor information centre at West Grinstead station site
- TCL99165 (5034) – now converted to Wheelchair accessible saloon on Bluebell Railway,
- TCL99166 (25776) – used as volunteer dormitory at Bluebell Railway.
- TCL99167 (21238) – used as volunteer dormitory at Kent and East Sussex Railway.

=== Classroom coaches ===
- TCL99169 (4941) – running at Bluebell Railway, converted as Wheelchair accessible saloon.
- TCL99170 (4957) – running at Bluebell Railway as passenger carriage,
- TCL99171 (4921) – now at North Yorkshire Moors Railway as passenger carriage,

=== Meeting coach ===
- TCL99168 (18778) – now in use as bed & breakfast accommodation at Coalport railway station

=== Restaurant coach ===
- 1815 – painted in TCL livery, but withdrawn in 1990. Now static use at Bere Ferrers railway station
