= Gertrude Ellen Hayes =

British painter and etcher (1872–1956)

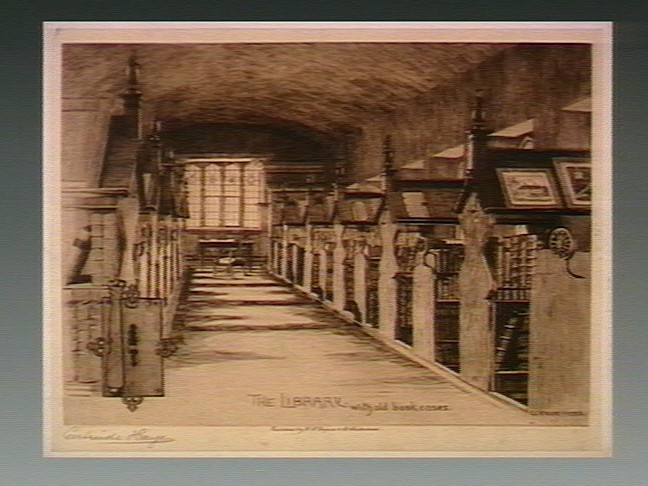
Getrude Ellen Hayes' etching The library with old bookcases, Cheltenham.

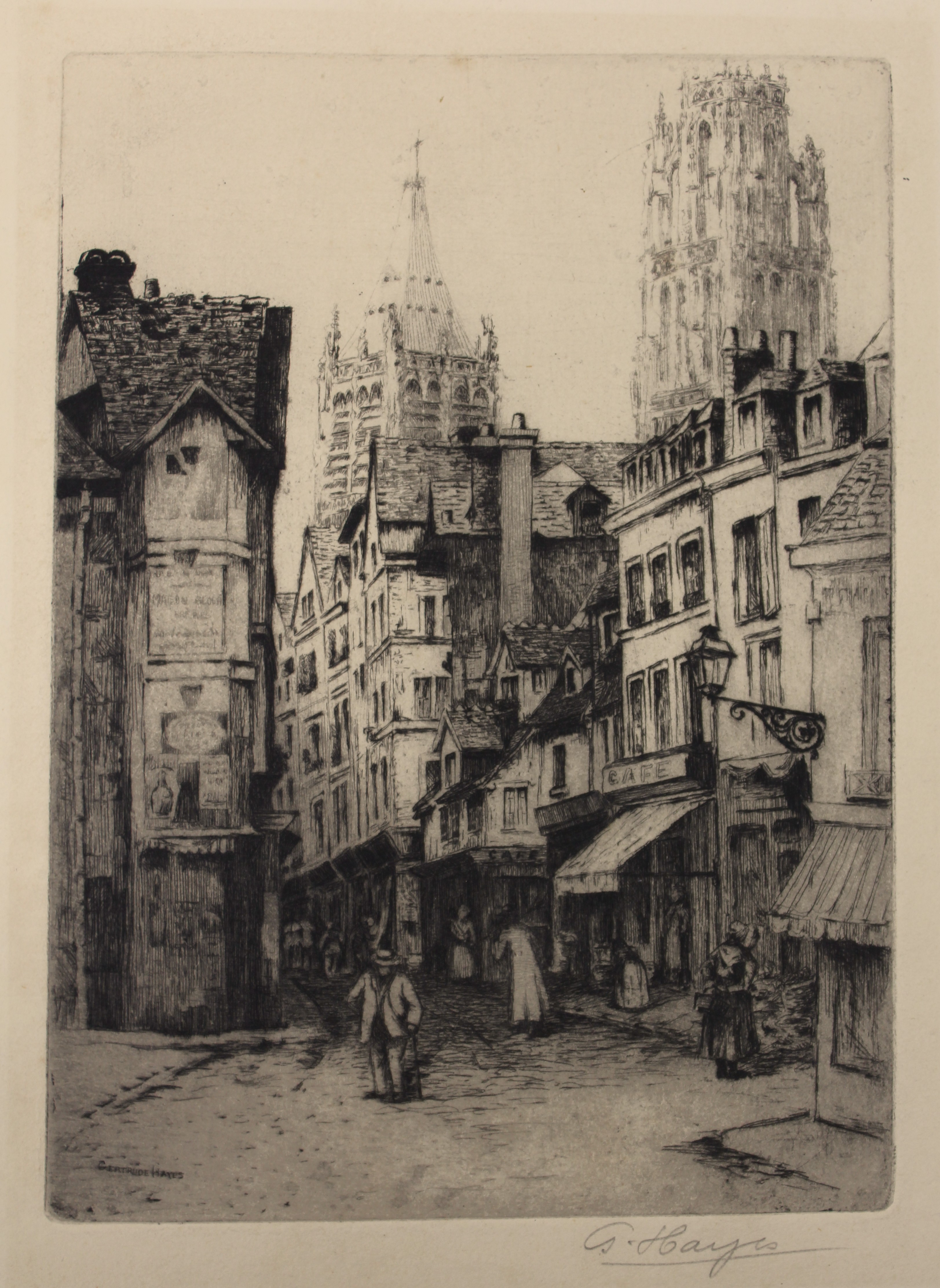
Rouen, etching by Gertrude Ellen Hayes c.1899

Gertrude Ellen Hayes (1872–1956) was a British artist known for her etchings, watercolour paintings, and repoussee metal work. Her etchings often featured architectural scenes of buildings or streets.

== Biography ==
Hayes was born in London. She attended the Royal College of Art and was later an instructor at the Rugby School. She married artist Alfred Kedington Morgan and took the married name Gertrude Ellen Morgan.

Hayes was a Prix de Rome scholar. She became the first woman to ever be elected to the Royal Society of Painter-Etchers.

Her work is included in the permanent collection of the Auckland Art Gallery.
