= SECR P class =

Class of 0-6-0T steam locomotive designed by Harry Wainwright

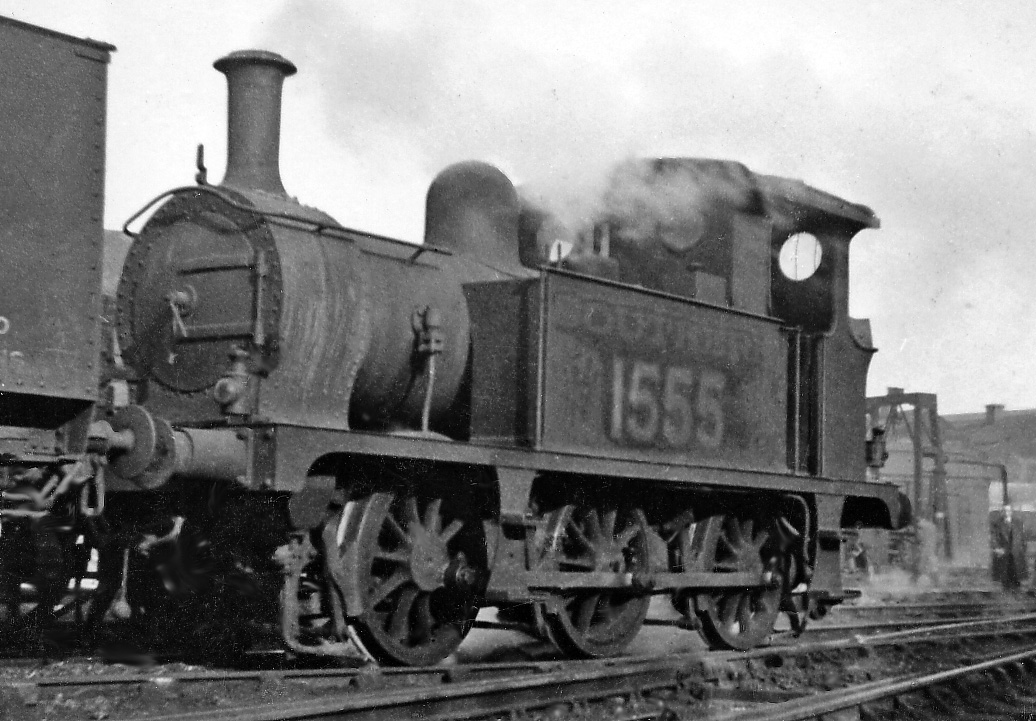
- SECR P Class No. 1555 at Brighton Locomotive Depot
Type and origin
- Power type: Steam
- Builder: SECR Ashford Works
- Build date: 1909 (2), 1910 (6)
- Total produced: 8
Specifications
- Configuration
  - Whyte: 0-6-0T
  - UIC: C n2t
- Gauge: 4 ft 8 1/2 in (1,435 mm) standard gauge
- Driver dia.: 3 ft 9 1/8 in (1.146 m)
- Wheelbase: 11 ft 0 in (3.35 m)
- Length: 23 ft 0 in (7.01 m)
- Axle load: 10 long tons 0 cwt (22,400 lb or 10.2 t)
- Loco weight: 28 long tons 10 cwt (63,800 lb or 29 t)
- Fuel type: Coal
- Fuel capacity: 0 long tons 18 cwt (2,000 lb or 0.9 t) (2,016 lb or 914 kg)
- Water cap.: 550 imp gal (2,500 L; 660 US gal)
- Firebox
  - Grate area: 9 sq ft (0.84 m^{2})
- Boiler pressure: 160 lbf/in^{2} (1.10 MPa)
- Heating surface
  - Firebox: 51 3/4 sq ft (4.81 m^{2})
  - Tubes: 387 1/4 sq ft (35.98 m^{2})
  - Total surface: 439 sq ft (40.78 m^{2})
- Superheater: None
- Cylinders: Two, inside
- Cylinder size: 12 in × 18 in (305 mm × 457 mm)
- Valve gear: Stephenson
Performance figures
- Tractive effort: 7,810 lbf (34.7 kN)
Career
- Operators: South Eastern and Chatham Railway; → Southern Railway; → British Railways
- Class: SECR / SR: P
- Power class: BR: 0F
- Locale: Southern Region
- Withdrawn: 1955–1961
- Disposition: Four preserved, four scrapped

The South Eastern and Chatham Railway (SECR) P class is a class of 0-6-0T steam locomotive designed by Harry Wainwright.

They were inspired by, and loosely based on, the more successful LB&SCR A1 class "Terriers" and eight were built in 1909 and 1910. They were originally intended for lightweight passenger trains, to replace underpowered steam railmotors. Certain cost-saving design compromises had been made, compared to the Terrier design, and the P class were found to be underpowered, having only 73% of the Terrier's tractive effort. The P class were later re-allocated to shunting and station pilot duties.

All eight locomotives passed into Southern Railway ownership at The Grouping in 1923, and into British Railways ownership at Nationalisation in 1948. Withdrawals took place between 1955 and 1961, but four examples have been preserved.

== Numbering ==
The first two locomotives, built in 1909, were numbered 753 and 754. The 1910-built locomotives re-used numbers of withdrawn locomotives and were numbered 27, 178, 323, 325, 555 and 558. In 1915, Two locomotives (27 and 753, known by the ROD as numbers 5027 and 5753 ) were transferred to the Government and used by the Railway Operating Division, arriving in France in May 1915. They were initially used during the construction of exchange sidings, and later to shunt the sidings and docks at Boulogne, but they proved to have insufficient power, and were returned to England in October 1916, to be replaced with the LCDR T class locomotive.

All eight passed to the Southern Railway upon its formation in 1923, and were given an 'A' prefix to their SECR numbers. in 1925, A753 and A754 were renumbered A556 and A557. In 1923, the Southern abolished the number prefixes, and increased the P class numbers by 1000. Upon Nationalisation in 1948, British Railways added 30000 to their SR number.

== Withdrawal ==
The class survived intact until 1955, when 31555 became the first locomotive to be withdrawn; 31557 followed in 1957. In 1958, 31178 was sold to Bowaters; and three locomotives were withdrawn in 1960: 31323, 31325 and 31558. The last two, 31027 and 31556, were withdrawn the following year.

Year	Quantity in service at start of year	Quantity withdrawn	Locomotive numbers	Notes
1955	8	1	31555	
1956	7	0	–	
1957	7	1	31557	
1958	6	1	31178	Sold to Bowaters. later preserved
1959	5	0	–	
1960	5	3	31323/25, 31558	31323 preserved.
1961	2	2	31027, 31556	Both preserved.

== Preservation ==
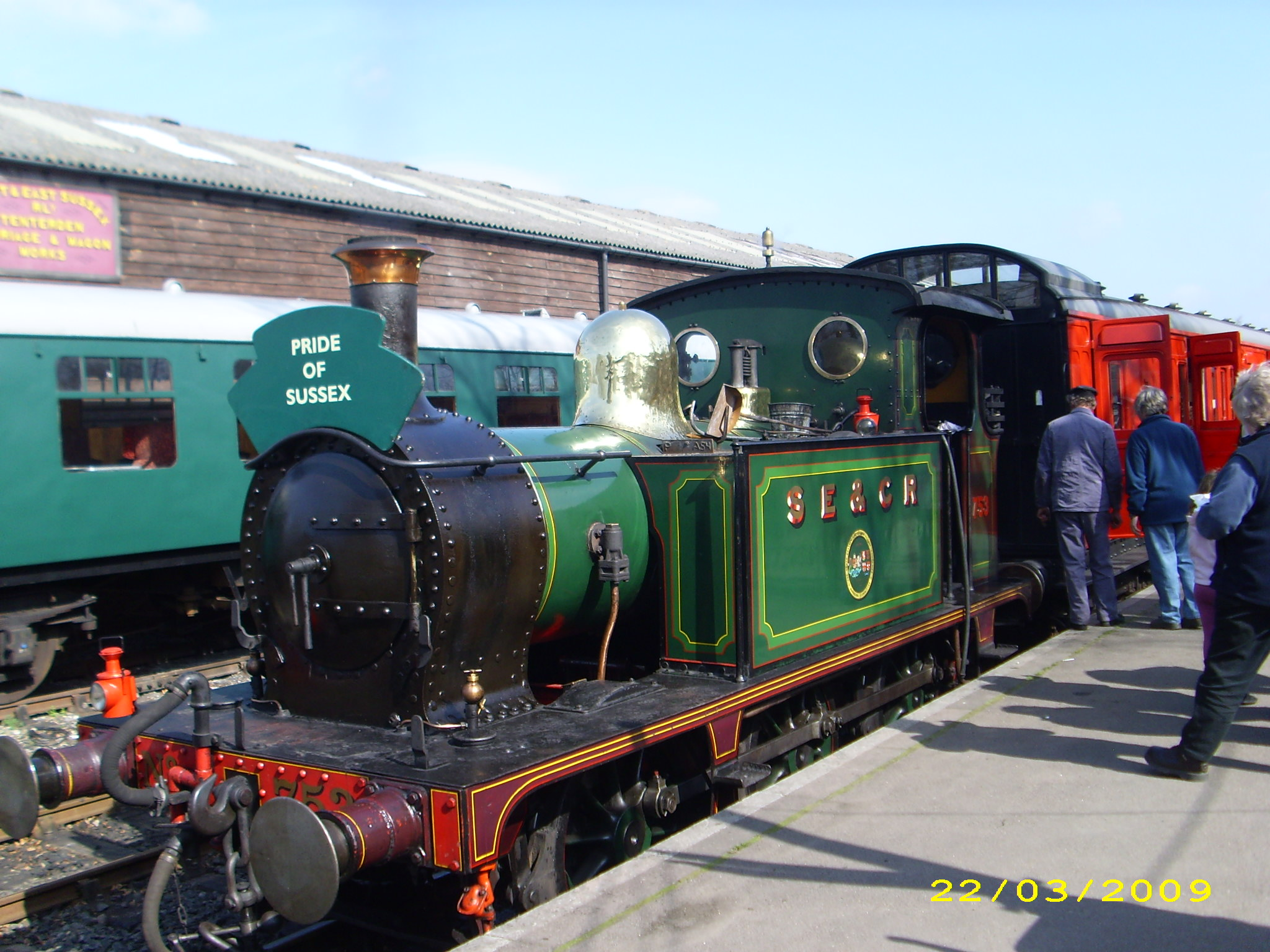
Preserved No. 753, painted in SECR green livery, on the Kent & East Sussex Railway

Half of the class have been preserved:

- No. 27, Known as Primrose, on the Bluebell Railway.
- No. 178, Known as Pioneer II, on the Bluebell Railway.
- No. 323, Known as Bluebell, on the Bluebell Railway.
- No. 753, Known as the Pride of Sussex, on the Kent and East Sussex Railway.

=== No. 323, Bluebell ===
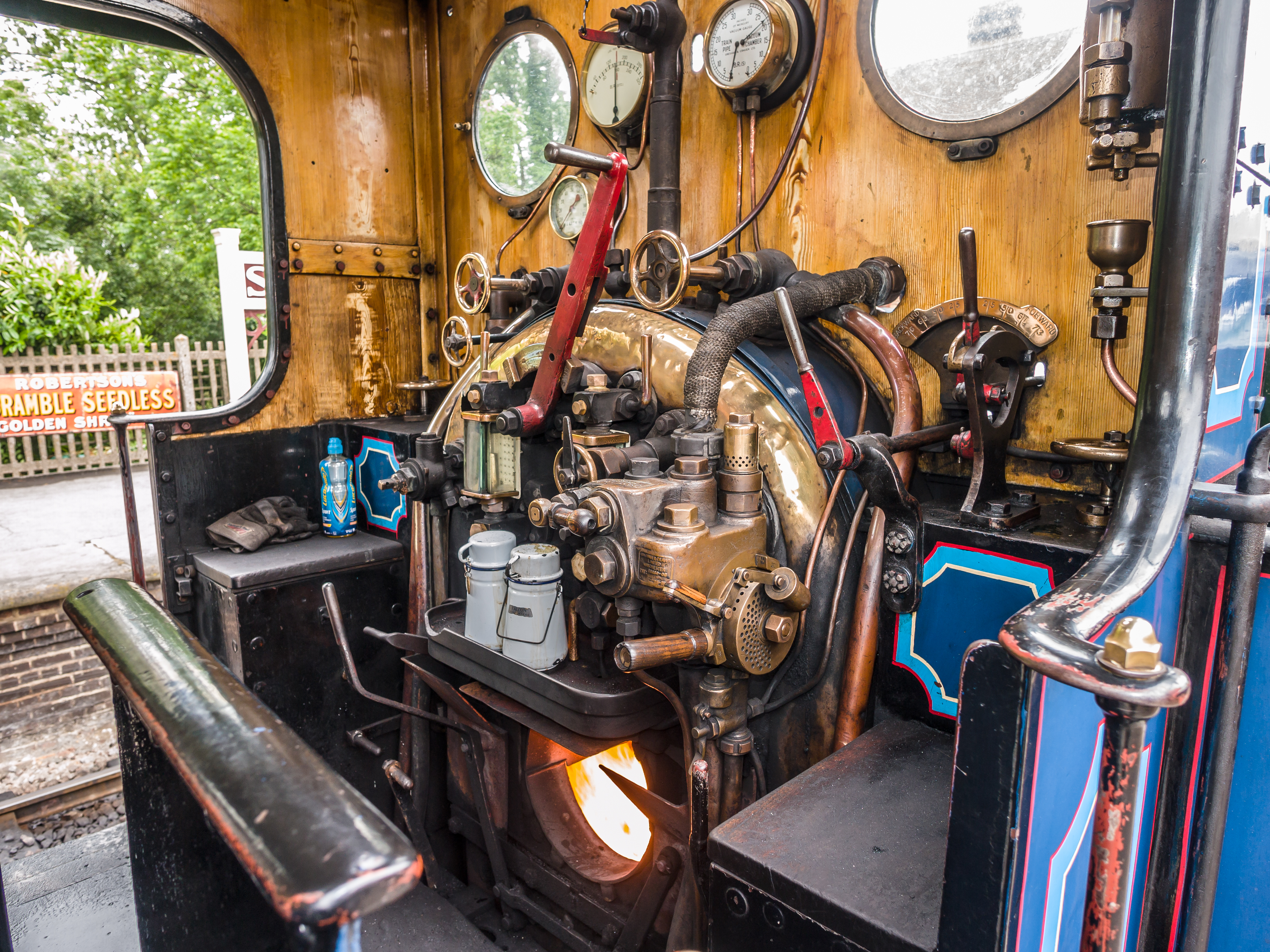
Inside the cab of "Bluebell"

The youngest member of the class, No. 323 Bluebell is one of the first two engines which worked passenger trains during the first year of the Bluebell Railway Preservation Society. It arrived at the Bluebell in 1960 and remained a stalwart in the Bluebell's locomotive fleet between 1960 and 1998 when it was withdrawn pending overhaul. During this time it also visited the East Somerset Railway for four years between 1980 and 1984.

In 2005, attempts to overhaul the engine, which had gained the unofficial name of Bluebell, were aborted and it was moved back to storage at Sheffield Park in a partially dismantled state. In September 2009 the decision was made to restore 323 to working order and it was moved into the workshops with the hope of having it operational in time for the Bluebell's fiftieth anniversary celebrations in August 2010.

However, it was discovered the firebox backhead had cracked, requiring repairs that prevented the locomotive from attending the celebrations. 323 returned to service in Spring 2011, when it attended the 'Branch Line Weekend' celebrations. It remained operational until Spring 2019 when it was withdrawn requiring a further overhaul. It is currently painted in 'Bluebell Blue' with the BRPS emblem on the side tanks.

=== No. 27, Primrose ===
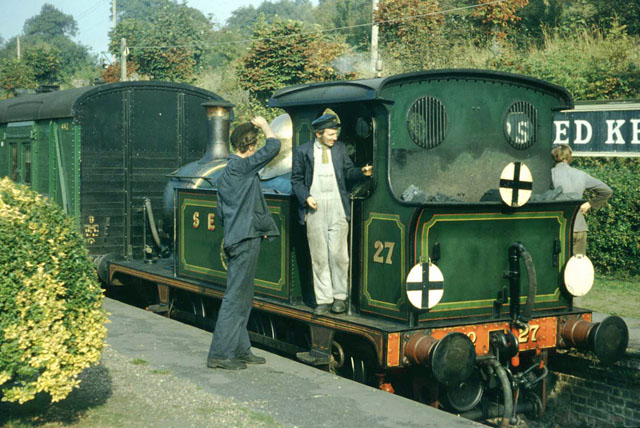
No. 27 at Horsted Keynes

No. 27 was the second P-class engine to be brought for preservation by the Bluebell Railway in Sussex. It arrived in 1961 and was used extensively until it was withdrawn for an overhaul in 1974. At the time the workshops were unable to overhaul it and so it was placed in storage. During its time in service on the Bluebell, it carried two liveries; the first being BR black with its SE&CR number 27 and its name Primrose between 1961 and 1963, after which in 1963 it was repainted in SE&CR lined green.

The locomotive was largely dismantled in the early 1980s as an exercise for apprentices from Stratford Works. However the overhaul did not take place as intended and the work was not commenced until 2011, by which time the loco had suffered greatly from corrosion. The restoration is being funded by the Fenchurch Fund and it is hoped that the loco will be working by 2019. This will dovetail with the withdrawal from traffic of sister engine Bluebell.

SE&CR No. 27 was last painted in SE&CR lined green. It is planned to restore it as Southern Railway No. A27 in SR Olive Green, as it would have looked after 1923 while based at Ashford.

The Fenchurch Fund Project 27 has obtained a new set of cylinders for the loco. These have now been cast using polystyrene patterns using technology pioneered for the LMS Patriot Project. They were delivered to Sheffield Park towards the end of 2017. A new set of frames, dragboxes & buffer beams were earlier delivered in October 2017.

=== No. 178, Pioneer II ===
No. 178 was purchased from Bowaters by the Bluebell Railway in 1969, by this time the locomotive was non-operational due to the cylinder block having cracked earlier that year. It was purchased by members of the Port Line locomotive group, who started restoring it in 1992. Work continued on this engine including fitting it with a new boiler, originally fitted to 323 when it arrived in 1960.

This locomotive was transferred back to the Bluebell's ownership in November 2007 and work continued with the firebox requiring partial renewal of the foundation ring. It returned to steam on 22 February 2010 as Bowaters' Pioneer II in SE&CR green, entering regular service later that week on 27 February. The locomotive was finished as SE&CR No. 178 in May 2010. After completing 10 and a half years in traffic the locomotive was withdrawn from service in October 2020 pending its next overhaul

== In fiction ==
In Stepney the "Bluebell" Engine, a book by the Rev. W. Awdry from The Railway Series, Nos. 323 and 27 were featured as engines that Stepney was talking about when he visited the Island of Sodor. No. 323 was named Bluebell, the name it currently carries, and No. 27 was named Primrose. Both engines were seen without faces. Bluebell was also released as a die-cast model by ERTL, although this used the same bodyshell as Thomas – a much larger tank locomotive.
