= George Lawrence Bulleid =

English painter

George Lawrence Bulleid (25 April 1858 – 1933) was a Victorian watercolourist, born in Glastonbury, Somerset in 1858. He died at his family home, 10 Beaufort East, Bath, Somerset on 18 March 1933.

His father was a local solicitor and Councillor. After working for the family firm, and qualifying as a solicitor in 1881, he started studying art classes in the evenings after work. He first studied at the West London School of Art under the instruction of George Simpson, before moving on to the Heatherley School of Fine Art. His work focused on groups of figures arranged within an architectural structure, contemplative or melancholic individuals.

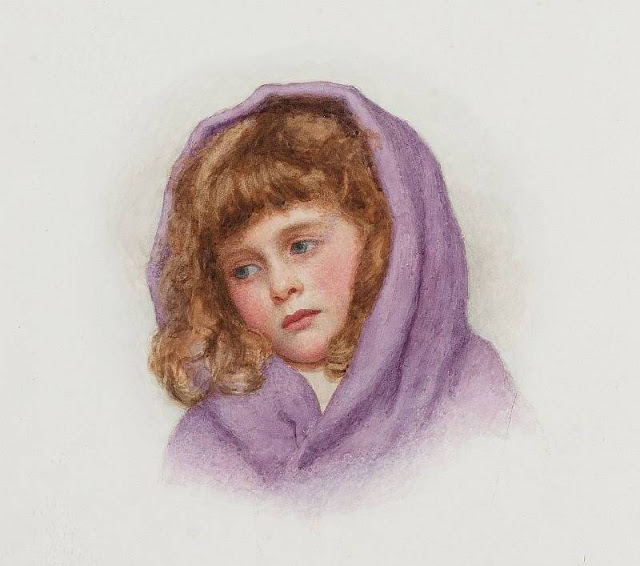
A Portrait of a young Girl

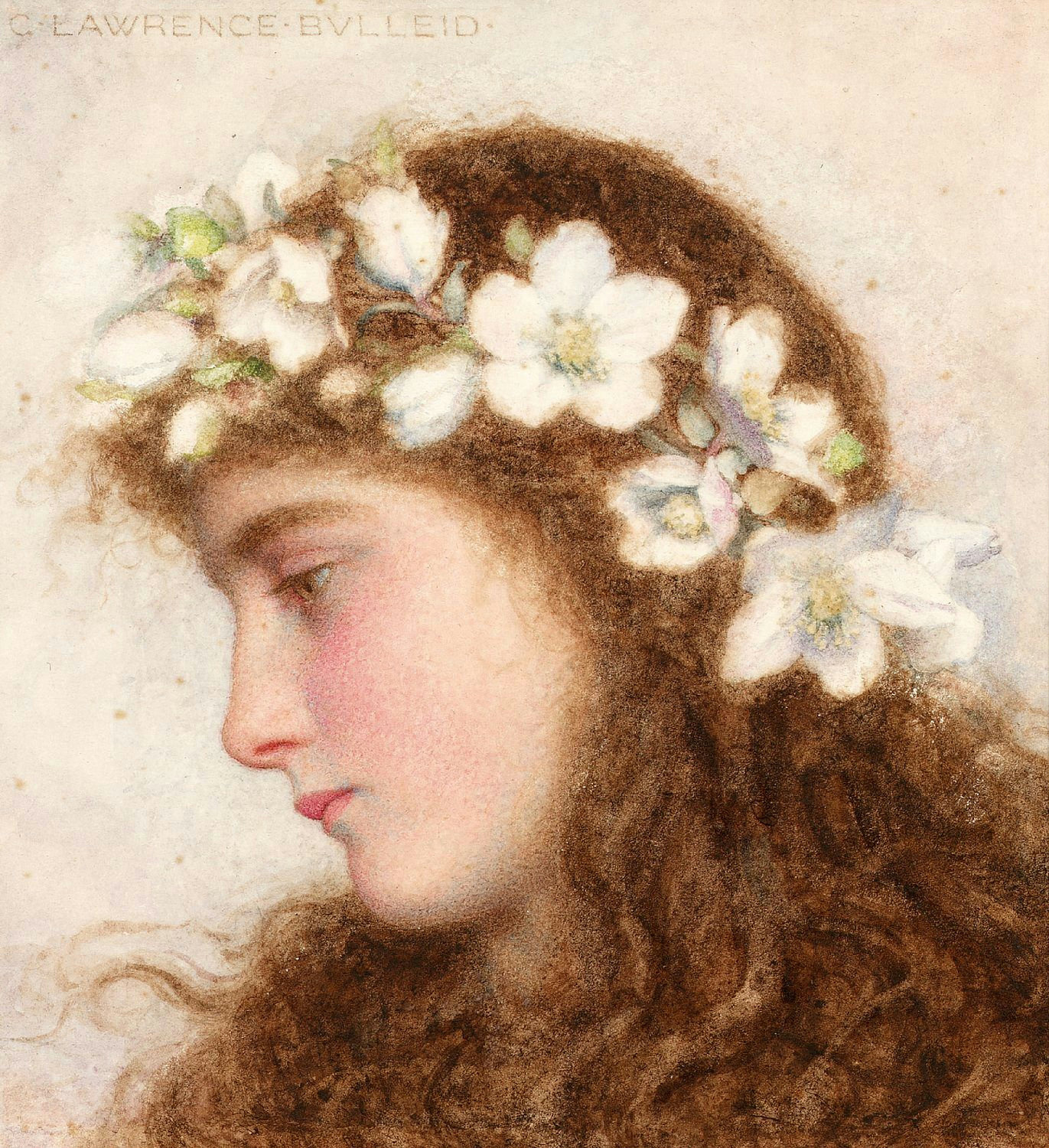
A girl wearing a garland-of wild roses

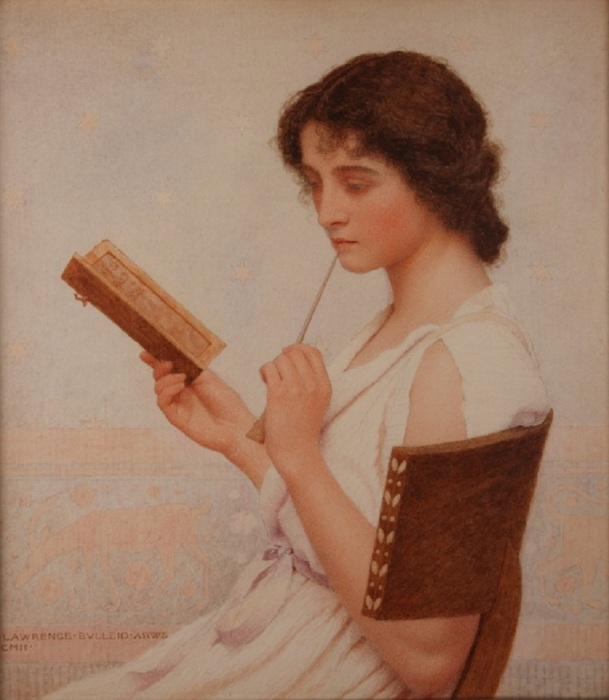
The Love Letter (1911)

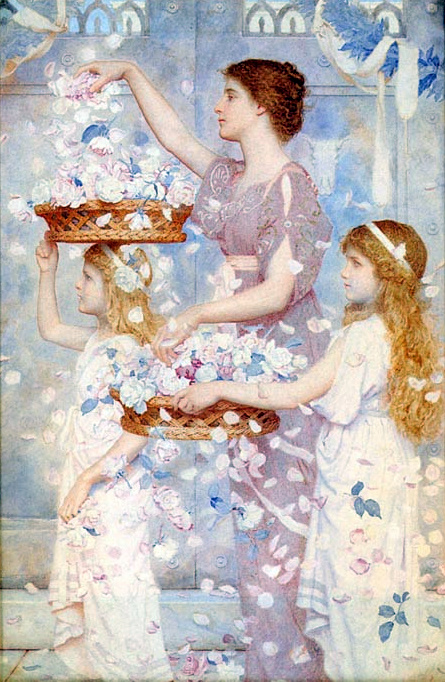
The Empress Comes

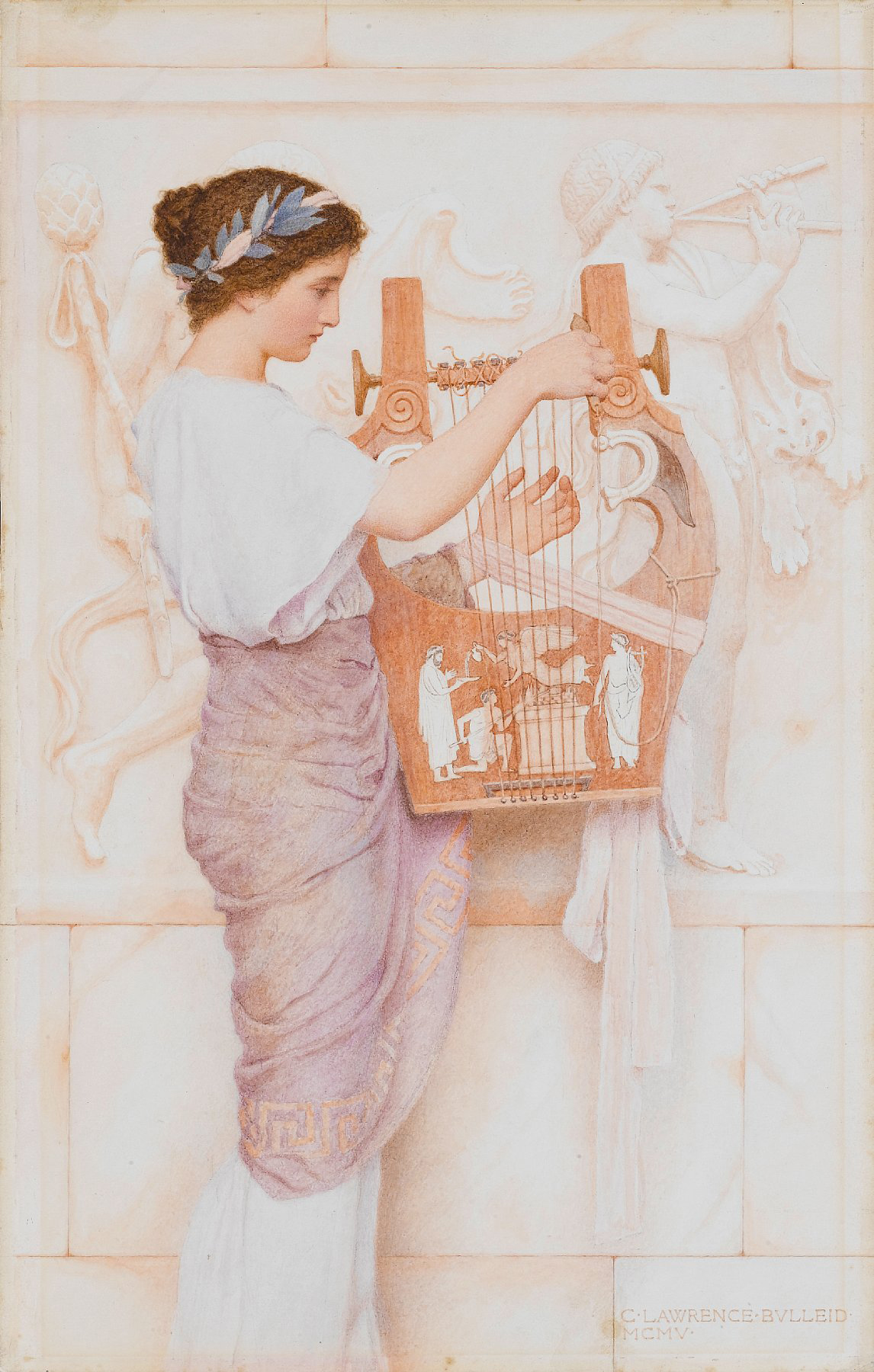
Girl with lute
