= SER B class =

Class of steam locomotives

SER B class; SECR B1 class
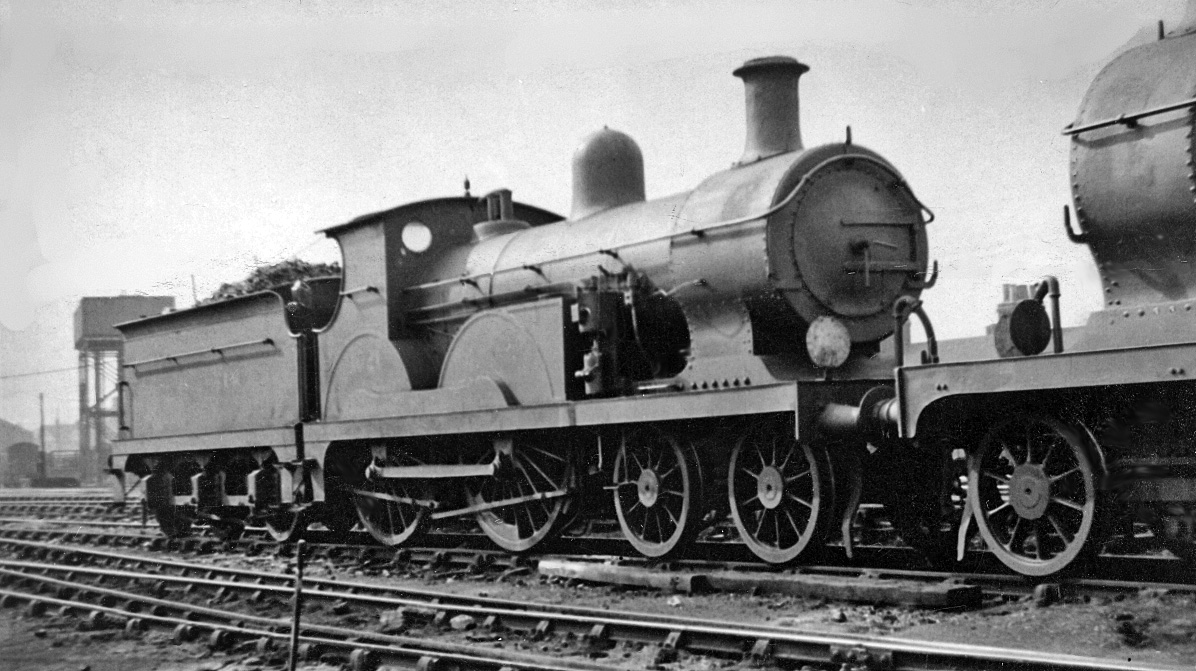
- B1 at Tonbridge Locomotive Depot 18 May 1946
Type and origin
- Power type: Steam
- Designer: James Stirling
- Builder: Neilson, Reid and Company (20); Ashford Works (9)
- Build date: 1898–1899 (as B class)
- Total produced: 29
- Rebuild date: 1910–1926 (as B1 class)
- Number rebuilt: 27
Specifications
- Configuration
  - Whyte: 4-4-0
  - UIC: 2′B
- Gauge: 4 ft 8 1/2 in (1,435 mm)
- Driver dia.: 7 ft 0 in (2.134 m)
- Loco weight: 45 long tons 2 cwt (101,000 lb or 45.8 t)
- Fuel type: Coal
- Boiler pressure: 170 lbf/in^{2} (1.17 MPa)
- Cylinders: Two, inside
- Cylinder size: 18 in × 26 in (457 mm × 660 mm)
Performance figures
- Tractive effort: 14,490 lbf (64.45 kN)
Career
- Operators: South Eastern and Chatham Railway; → Southern Railway; → Southern Region of British Railways
- Class: B, B1
- Withdrawn: 1930–1951
- Disposition: All scrapped

The SER B class was a class of 4-4-0 steam tender locomotive designed by James Stirling for express passenger service on the South Eastern Railway (SER). Thirty were ordered in 1897, twenty from Neilson & Co. (which became Neilson, Reid & Co. the following year) and ten from Ashford Works. The SER entered into a working agreement with the London, Chatham and Dover Railway (LCDR) during 1898, the effect of which was to create the South Eastern and Chatham Railway (SECR) at the start of 1899 to operate the trains of the two companies. To this end, all SER and LCDR locomotives were transferred to the SECR. At this time, 24 of the 30 locomotives had been delivered, including all of those from Neilson; only five of the six outstanding Ashford locomotives were built, the last being cancelled. They remained B class on the SECR and, between 1910 and 1927 all but two the B class engines were rebuilt with new boilers by Harry Wainwright to become B1 class.

== Numbering ==
Twenty B Class engines were built by Neilson, Reid and Company and numbered 440-459. A further nine were built at the South Eastern Railway's Ashford railway works and, as was common practice on the SER, were given numbers that were vacant at the time, due to the withdrawal of older SER 118 class locomotives: 217, 13, 21, 101, 34, 17, 132, 186, 189; the tenth Ashford locomotive would have been numbered 18. They kept these numbers under the SECR. When the Southern Railway took over in 1923 they initially gave the numbers an "A" prefix and later added 1000 to them. For example, 440 became A440 and then 1440 and 13 became A13 and then 1013.

== Rebuilding ==
In May 1900, the SECR Board decided to try out oil as a locomotive fuel, using the system devised by James Holden of the Great Eastern Railway. Two B class locomotives were selected in July 1900 for the trial, nos. 454 and 459. Both were in Ashford Works at the time, no. 454 awaiting repair from its accident earlier that month, and no. 459 for a normal general repair. The necessary modifications were completed in November and December, following which the locomotives were painted, and trials conducted. They returned to normal service in April 1901. Various difficulties in service were encountered, and in April 1904 it was decided to end the trial. No. 459 was reconverted to coal-burning in 1904, and no. 454 in 1905.

The introduction of the SECR D class in 1901 and also the SECR E class in 1906, both of which were intended for the express services, meant that the B class were displaced to less important passenger trains, upon which their large domeless boilers of 4 feet 7 inches (1.40 m) diameter gave an uneconomically high fuel consumption. Accordingly, when new boilers became necessary from 1910, the opportunity was taken to fit a smaller boiler, and Harry Wainwright, the SECR's locomotive, carriage and wagon superintendent, decided to fit the same 4 ft 3 in (1.30 m) diameter domed boiler as had been used since 1903 to rebuild the SER F class to the SECR F1 class. Between 1910 and 1916, 25 such rebuilds of B class locomotives were carried out, becoming the B1 class; two more were rebuilt in 1926 and 1927. After rebuilding, the F1 and B1 classes were almost identical, and were used on similar duties. Two B class locomotives were not rebuilt.

== Withdrawal ==
The two B class locomotives that had not been rebuilt to B1 class, nos. A34 and A458, were withdrawn in 1930 and 1931 respectively. Withdrawal of the B1 class began in 1933, eight being withdrawn between then and 1936, as surplus to requirements. The remaining nineteen survived World War II, but were withdrawn between 1947 and 1951. Sixteen of these entered British Railways stock at the start of 1948, but only one, no. 1446, was renumbered, becoming BR no. 31446.

== Accidents and incidents ==
- On 11 July 1900, no. 454, hauling an eight-carriage express from Margate Sands to Cannon Street, was in collision with the rear of a goods train at Sevenoaks (Tubs Hill); the goods train was on the wrong line due to a signalman's error. Twelve passengers were injured, as were three members of train crews; all fifteen were on board the express. The locomotive, tender and leading coach of the express were damaged, as were six wagons and a brake van at the rear of the goods train, together with six coaches of an empty train that were standing in an adjacent siding. The damaged locomotive was taken to Ashford Works, and while awaiting repair, was selected for the recently-approved oil-burning trial.
- On 19 May 1938, locomotive No. 1454 was derailed at Blackfriars station, London, causing delays for several hours.
