= SER A class =

Type and origin
- Power type: Steam
- Designer: James Stirling
- Builder: Ashford Works
- Build date: 1879–1881
- Total produced: 12
Specifications
- Configuration
  - Whyte: 4-4-0
- Gauge: 4 ft 8 1/2 in (1,435 mm)
- Leading dia.: 3 ft 8 in (1,120 mm)
- Coupled dia.: 6 ft 0 1/2 in (1,842 mm)
- Wheelbase
  - Engine: 20 ft 10 1/4 in (6.356 m)
  - Leading: 5 ft 4 in (1,630 mm)
  - Coupled: 8 ft 2 in (2,490 mm)
- Axle load
  - Leading: 12 long tons 2 cwt (27,100 lb or 12.3 t)
  - 1st coupled: 14 long tons 2 cwt (31,600 lb or 14.3 t)
  - 2nd coupled: 11 long tons 5 cwt (25,200 lb or 11.4 t)
- Loco weight: 37 long tons 19 cwt (85,000 lb or 38.6 t)
- Tender weight: 25 long tons 14 cwt (57,600 lb or 26.1 t)
- Total weight: 63 long tons 13 cwt (142,600 lb or 64.7 t)
- Fuel type: Coal
- Fuel capacity: 3 long tons 0 cwt (6,700 lb or 3 t)
- Water cap.: 2,100 imp gal (9,500 L)
- Firebox
  - Type: Round-top
  - Grate area: 15 1/4 ft^{2} (1.42 m^{2})
- Boiler
  - Type: Domeless
  - Small tubes: 230 × 1 5/8 in (41 mm)
- Boiler pressure: 140 lbf/in^{2} (970 kPa)
- Safety valve: Ramsbottom
- Heating surface
  - Firebox: 95 1/4 ft^{2} (8.85 m^{2})
  - Tubes: 1,034 ft^{2} (96.1 m^{2})
  - Total surface: 1,129 1/4 ft^{2} (104.91 m^{2})
- Cylinders: Two, inside
- Cylinder size: 18 in × 26 in (460 mm × 660 mm)
Career
- Operators: South Eastern Railway; → South Eastern and Chatham Railway
- Class: A
- Withdrawn: 1907–1909
- Disposition: All scrapped

The SER A class was a class of 4-4-0 locomotives on the South Eastern Railway.

== History ==
For many years the South Eastern Railway (SER) had relied upon locomotives of the 2-4-0 wheel arrangements for their semi-fast passenger services. James Stirling had been appointed to the post of locomotive superintendent of the SER on 28 March 1878. He came from the Glasgow and South Western Railway where, since 1873, he had used 4-4-0 locomotives for express passenger services as being more capable than the 2-4-0s hitherto favoured. Accordingly, his first new class of locomotive for the SER was a 4-4-0, and 12 were built at Ashford Works between 1879 and 1881. The boiler was interchangeable with that of the O class 0-6-0 (introduced 1878) and also with the later Q class (introduced 1881).

When new, the locomotives were painted holly green, and their numbers were scattered between 19 and 179. The green was replaced by black from December 1883. Their SER numbers were retained under the South Eastern and Chatham Railway (SECR), although from 1900 the livery changed from black to Brunswick green.

Table of orders and numbers
Year	Quantity	SER Nos.
1879	2	165, 157
1880	9	163, 166, 160, 176, 159, 179, 19, 67, 36
1881	1	175

No. 67 was the 200th locomotive built at Ashford.

=== Rebuilding ===
The original boilers of all twelve locomotives were replaced between 1889 and 1894, the detail differences were small; and between 1901 and 1908, five were rebuilt for a second time by the SECR with Wainwright-design boilers of a different design.

=== Withdrawal ===
Due to the introduction of newer types by the SECR, the class became redundant and in March 1907 it was decided that all twelve A class locomotives were to be withdrawn when next needing heavy repairs. Two were withdrawn in June 1907, five more in 1908 leaving five in service at the start of 1909. After withdrawal in January 1908, the boiler of no. 165 was used to rebuild no. 163 which became the last to be withdrawn, on 30 June 1909.
