= SECR E class =

Class of locomotive

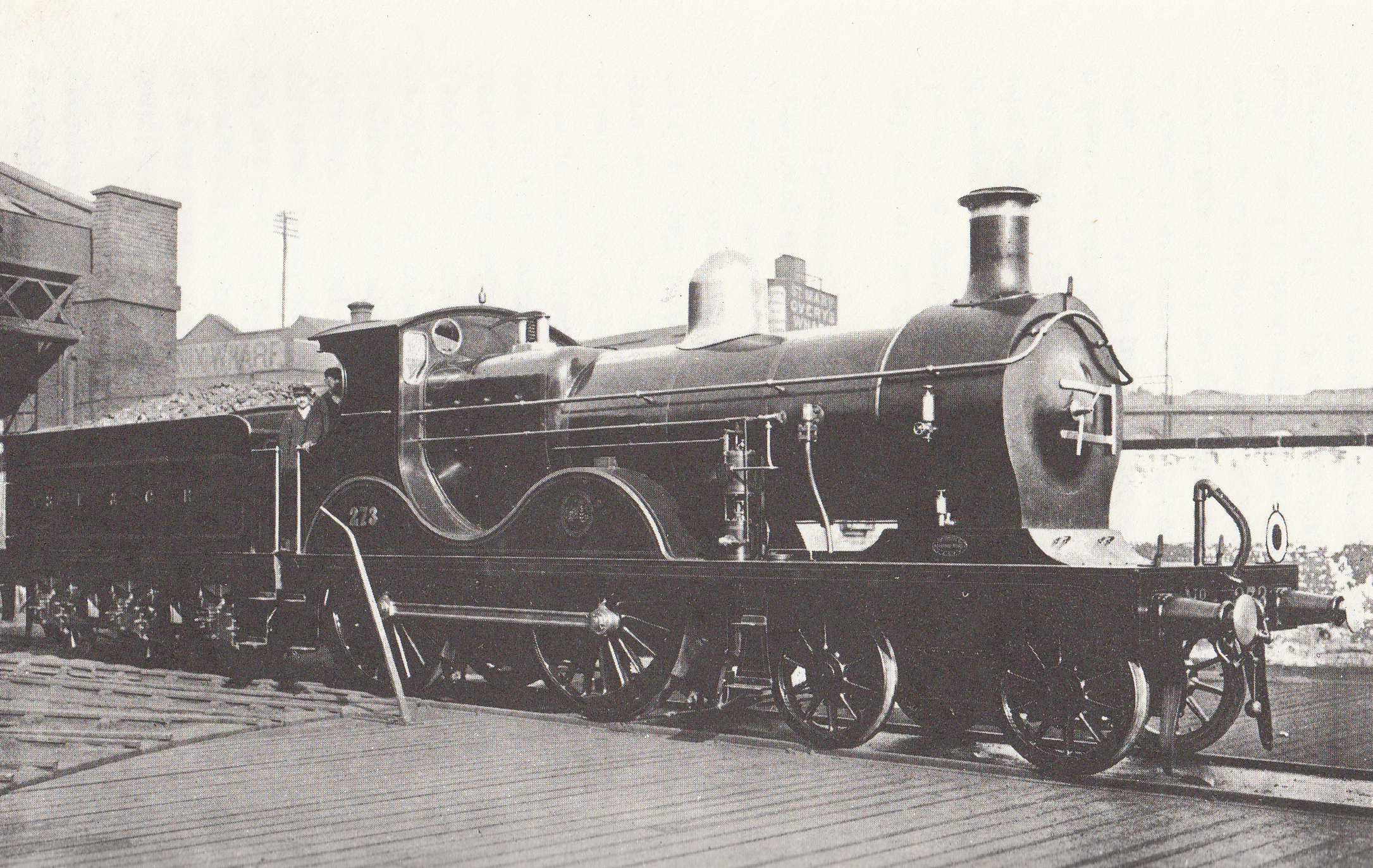
- SECR E class 273 at Cannon Street
Type and origin
- Power type: Steam
- Designer: Harry Wainwright
- Builder: Ashford Works
- Build date: 1906–1908
- Total produced: 26
Specifications
- Configuration
  - Whyte: 4-4-0
  - UIC: E: 2′B n2; E1: 2′B h2
- Gauge: 4 ft 8 1/2 in (1,435 mm)
- Leading dia.: 3 ft 6 in (1.067 m)
- Driver dia.: 6 ft 6 in (1.981 m)
- Length: 55 ft 3 in (16.840 m)
- Loco weight: 52 long tons 5 cwt (117,000 lb or 53.1 t)
- Tender weight: 39 long tons 2 cwt (87,600 lb or 39.7 t)
- Fuel type: Coal
- Fuel capacity: 4 long tons 0 cwt (9,000 lb or 4.1 t)
- Water cap.: 3,450 imp gal (15,700 L; 4,140 US gal)
- Firebox
  - Grate area: 21 1/4 sq ft (1.97 m^{2})
- Boiler pressure: 180 lbf/in^{2} (1.24 MPa)
- Heating surface
  - Firebox: 136 sq ft (12.6 m^{2})
  - Tubes: 1,396 sq ft (129.7 m^{2})
  - Total surface: 1,532 sq ft (142.3 m^{2})
- Cylinders: Two, inside
- Cylinder size: 19 in × 26 in (483 mm × 660 mm)
- Valve gear: Stephenson
Career
- Operators: South Eastern and Chatham Railway; → Southern Railway; → British Railways
- Class: E
- Power class: British Railways: E: 1P, later 2P; E1: 2P, later 3P
- Locale: Southern Region
- Withdrawn: E: 1951, 1953–1955; E1: 1949–1951, 1958-1961
- Disposition: 11 rebuilt to E1 class all later scrapped

The SECR E class was a class of 4-4-0 tender locomotives designed by Harry Wainwright for express passenger trains on the South Eastern and Chatham Railway. It was a larger version of the D class incorporating a Belpaire firebox.

== Overview ==
Following the success of his D class 4-4-0 design, Wainwright obtained authority to build a further five similar locomotives incorporating a Belpaire firebox to provide additional power. These were built at Ashford railway works during the last few months of 1905 and entered traffic early in 1906. Once the design had proved to be successful, further orders were placed until 26 had been constructed at Ashford by April 1909. In 1911 and 1912 two examples of the class received boilers with superheaters, which significantly improved their fuel efficiency, but unfortunately the additional weight prevented them from working over the lines of the former London Chatham and Dover Railway (LCDR) and so no further examples were so treated.

== E1 class ==
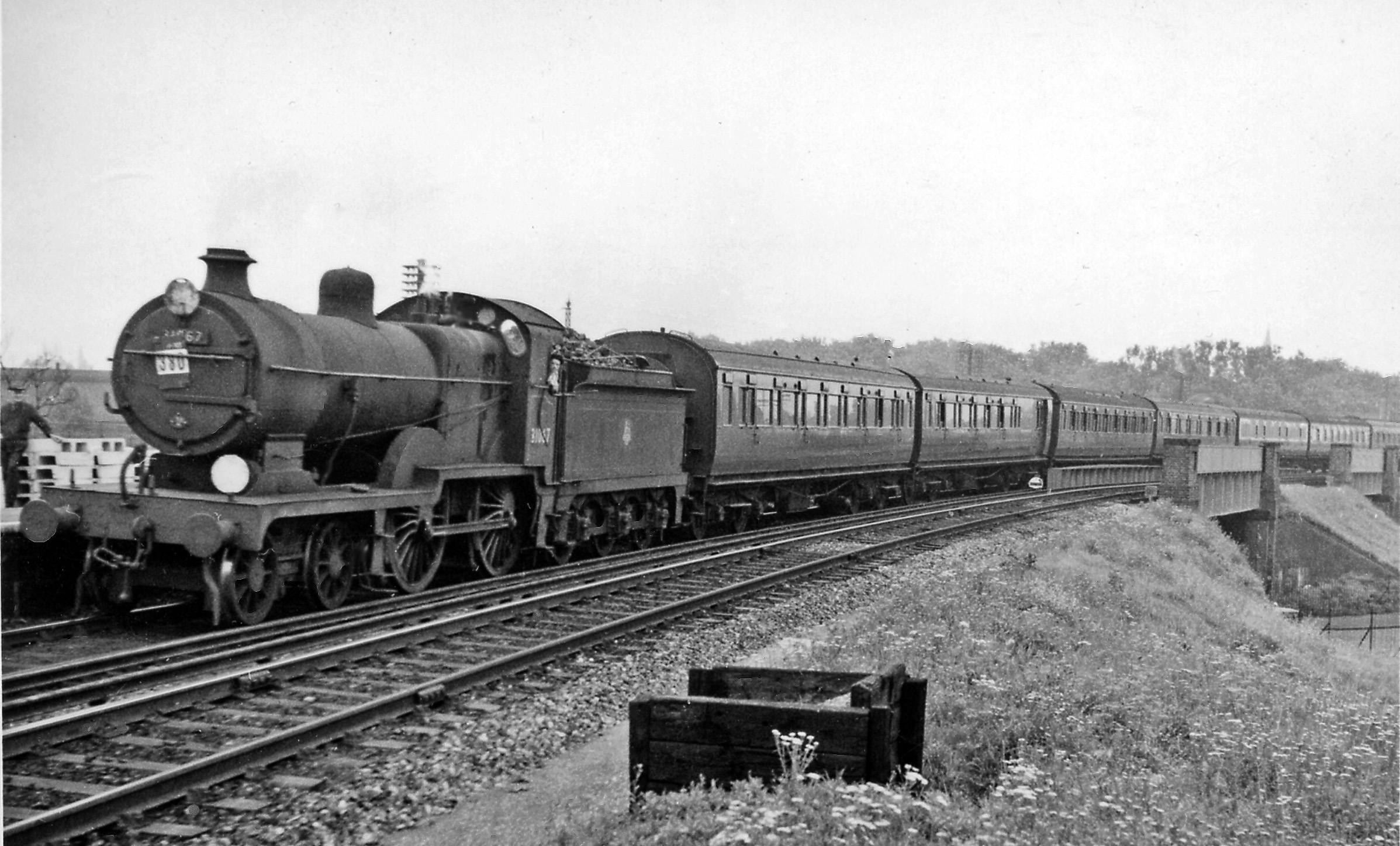
E1 31067 at Margate 1958.

In 1917 the SECR Board decided that when the London to Dover and Folkestone boat trains were reinstated after the war, they would be centred on London Victoria railway station, using the LCDR lines. This created a serious problem of producing a locomotive with sufficient power but with an acceptable axle load. Richard Maunsell therefore ordered the rebuilding of one example with larger cylinders, boiler and firebox, while at the same time reducing unnecessary weight elsewhere in the locomotive. This work was largely undertaken by his Chief Locomotive Draughtsman James Clayton. The experimental rebuilding was implemented following the Armistice in November 1918 and proved to be successful. A further ten examples were rebuilt by Beyer, Peacock and Company during 1919 and 1920, and ten more were supposed to follow in 1921, although at the last minute ten D class locomotives were rebuilt instead following the same principles.

== Operation ==
The class was used on the London to Dover and Folkestone boat trains and other Kent coast expresses on the South Eastern Main Line. Locomotive No 506 was used to haul the train containing the Cavell Van ( No 132) bringing back the remains of the Unknown Warrior from Dover to London on 10 November 1920. After 1914 they were replaced on the heaviest express trains by the L class 4-4-0 on the lines of the former South Eastern Railway but they remained the heaviest locomotives allowed on the LCDR lines until the rebuilt locomotives took over. Thereafter the remaining members of the class were employed on the secondary express trains on these lines.

In the years immediately following the grouping of the SECR with other railways to form the Southern Railway (UK) in 1923 the E class locomotives continued with their existing duties, but in 1931 three examples were transferred to the Central Section to assist with expresses on the Brighton Main Line, followed by further examples. During the Second World War they were also regularly employed on the line between Redhill and Reading.

The E1 class was replaced on the heaviest boat trains in the mid-1920s by the LSWR N15 class 4-6-0 locomotives. For a while they were used on expresses to Ramsgate but in the 1930s several of the class were transferred to the former London Brighton and South Coast Railway main lines in Sussex.

In 1948 British Railways (BR) inherited all 26 locomotives: fifteen that remained as E class, and eleven of the E1 class. BR increased the numbers by 30000, except for four E class (nos. 1157/75, 1491, 1547), and one E1 class (no. 1163) which were withdrawn before renumbering could occur. The BR power classification, introduced in January 1949, was initially 1P for class E and 2P for class E1, but these were revised to 2P and 3P respectively in October 1953.

=== Withdrawal and preservation ===
The majority of the remaining E class locomotives were withdrawn during 1951 but one lasted until May 1955. The E1 rebuilds were withdrawn over a far longer period between May 1949 and November 1961, with three examples lasting until the 1960s. No examples have been preserved.

The Brighton Atlantic Group at the Bluebell Railway had announced that, following the completion of new Brighton H2 class No. 32424 Beachy Head, it would begin construction on a new E class locomotive to take the number 516. By 2022 however, this project was abandoned.

Table of withdrawals
Year	Quantity in service at start of year	Quantity withdrawn	Locomotive numbers	Notes
1949	26	1	31163	E1 class
1950	25	2	31179, 31511	E1 class
1951	23	13	31036, 31157/59–60/75–76, 31273/75, 31514–16/47/87	31160 E1 class, remainder E class
1952	10	0	–	
1953	10	1	31491	E class
1954	9	1	31315	E class
1955	8	1	31166	E class (last one)
1956–57	7	0	–	
1958	7	2	31504/06	E1 class
1959	5	1	31165	E1 class
1960	4	1	31497	E1 class
1961	3	3	31019/67, 31507	E1 class

== Accidents and incidents ==
- On 5 March 1909, locomotive No. 165 was hauling a mail train that was in collision with an express passenger train hauled by locomotive No. 497 at Tonbridge Junction, Kent after the latter overran signals. Two people were killed and eleven were injured.
