= SECR R class =

SECR R class may refer to:

- LCDR R class – a class of 0-4-4T locomotives built by the London, Chatham and Dover Railway (LCDR) in 1891
- LCDR R1 class – a class of 0-4-4T locomotives built by the South Eastern and Chatham Railway to modified LCDR design in 1900
- SER R class – a class of 0-6-0T locomotives built by the South Eastern Railway (SER) between 1888 and 1898
- SECR R1 class – a class of 0-6-0T locomotives rebuilt by the South Eastern and Chatham Railway from the SER R class between 1910 and 1922
