= Reading Southern railway station =

Former railway station in Berkshire, England

Reading Southern
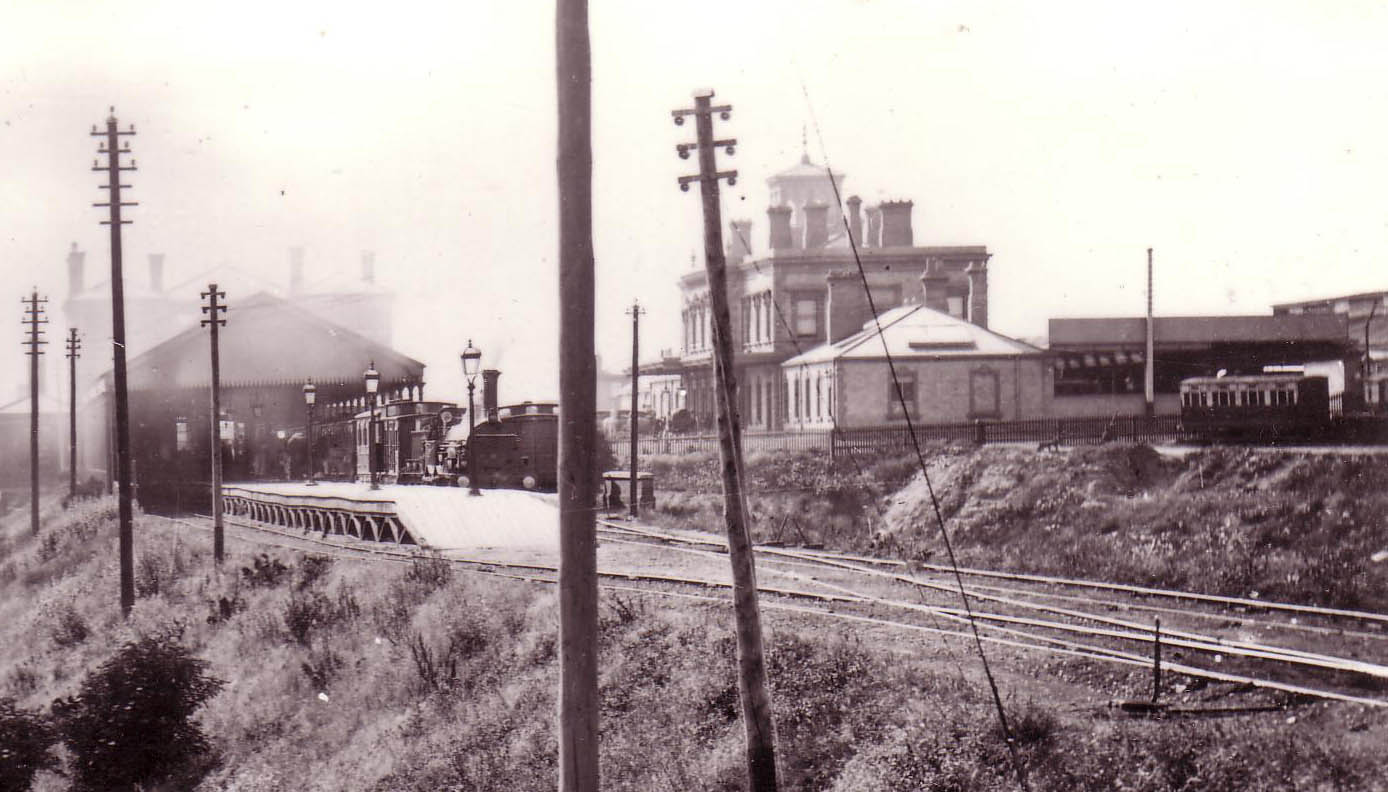
- A view of stations at Reading, circa 1865–70, with the SER station on the left and the GWR station at higher level on the right

General information
- Location: Reading, England
- Coordinates: 51.4582°N 0.9701°W
- Grid reference: SU716737
- Platforms: 4

Other information
- Status: Disused

History
- Original company: South Eastern Railway
- Pre-grouping: South Eastern and Chatham Railway
- Post-grouping: Southern Railway

Key dates
- 4 July 1849: Temporary station opened
- 30 August 1855: Permanent station opened, as Reading
- 9 July 1856: LSWR services commence
- 1 January 1939: Electrified
- 26 September 1949: Renamed Reading South
- 11 September 1961: Renamed Reading Southern
- 6 September 1965: Closed to passengers
- September 1970: Closed to goods
Location

Reading Southern railway station served the town of Reading, in Berkshire, England, between 1855 and 1970. It was sited to the south of Reading General station on the Great Western Main Line. The station was opened in 1855 by the South Eastern Railway's route from Redhill, connecting Reading with south coast towns such as Brighton and Dover. It also became the terminus of the outer suburban Waterloo to Reading line from London Waterloo. The station closed to passengers in 1965, when services were diverted to the former Great Western station, and the site was later cleared.

== History ==
=== Construction and early years ===
The original route of the South Eastern Railway (SER) was from London Bridge to Dover Town, which took a route through Redhill so that several companies could share the same lines and engineering (including a substantial tunnel) through the North Downs. The line from Reading to Redhill was built by the Reading, Guildford and Reigate Railway (RG&RR), and was opened in 1849; the section from Reading to Farnborough North was opened on 4 July 1849, with the last section being opened on 15 October. From the start, the RG&RR was worked by the SER, which leased it from 16 July 1846, and absorbed it in 1852. When the first section of line opened, the SER trains served a temporary station north of Reading's Forbury Road before moving into a permanent terminal, about 275 metres (300 yd) west, on 30 August 1855.

Reading had been served by the Great Western Railway (GWR) since 1840. The competing 1855 SER station was west of Vastern Road, on the corner of Blagrave Street and Station Road, adjacent to but south-east of the GWR station and at a lower level.

The Staines, Wokingham & Woking Junction Railway (SW&WJR) opened a line between the existing London to Windsor line station of Staines in Middlesex (today in northern Surrey) and Wokingham in Berkshire on 9 July 1856; the SW&WJR was worked by the London and South Western Railway (LSWR), and they were authorised to run over the SER into Reading. In this way, Reading gained a service into London Waterloo. The SW&WJR was absorbed by the LSWR in 1878.

The original station did not last long, since it was destroyed by fire in 1859 after being struck by lightning. A replacement was built, which had two platform faces; it was enlarged in 1896 by the provision of two more faces following the resiting of the locomotive shed.

At the opening, there were four trains a day to Redhill (then known as Reigate Junction), two of which continued to Tonbridge; a through service to London Bridge began in 1852 and two more were added in 1853.

=== The middle period ===
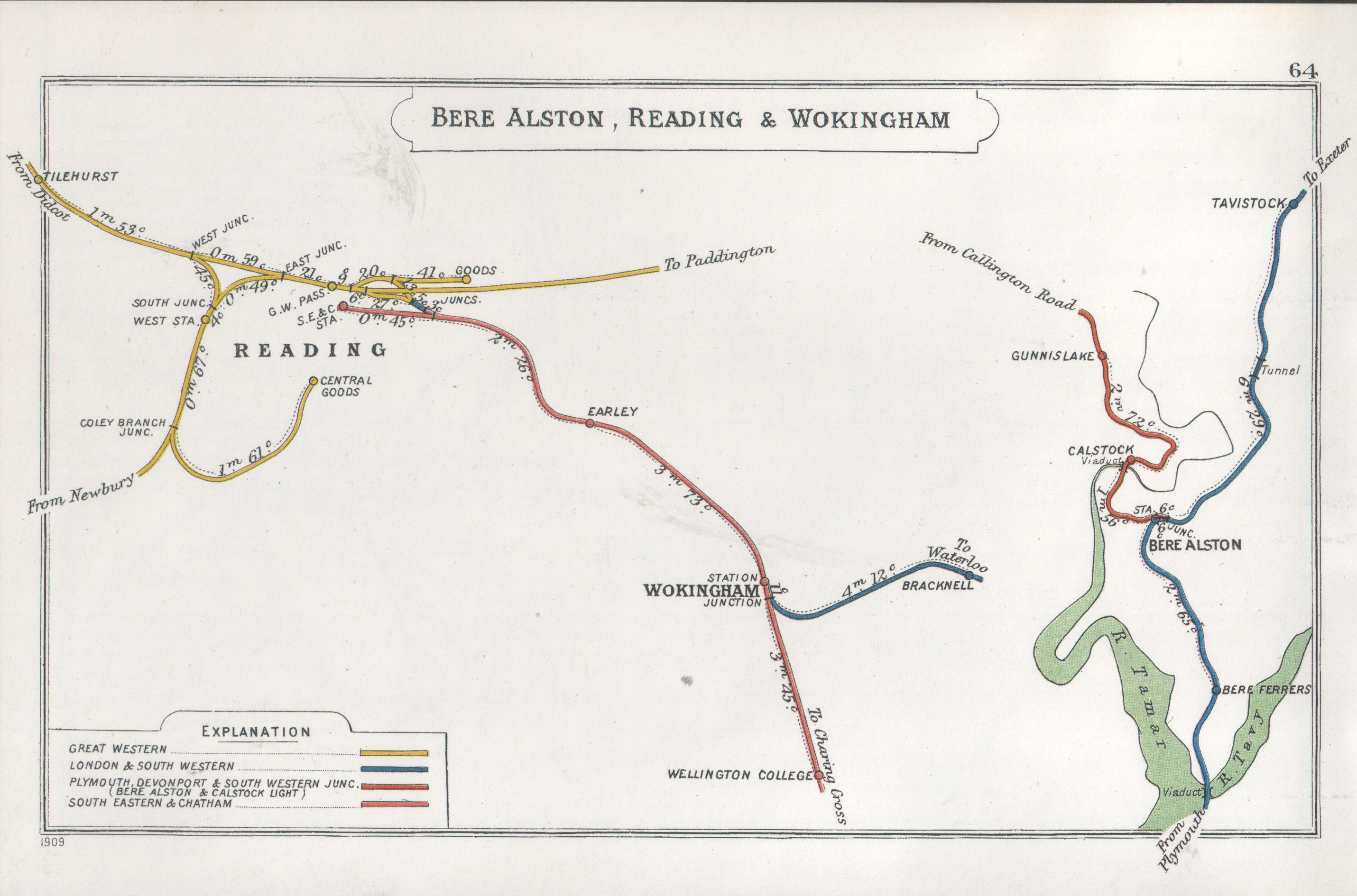
A 1909 Railway Clearing House map of railways in the vicinity of Reading Southern (shown here as S.E.& C. STA.)

In 1899, the SER handed over its operations to a new organisation co-owned with the London, Chatham and Dover Railway (LCDR), which traded as the South Eastern and Chatham Railway (SE&CR); the line and station continued to be owned and maintained by the SER. In 1923, the LSWR and SER amalgamated, together with other railways including the LCDR (and thus the SE&CR), to form the Southern Railway (SR), which assumed complete control of Reading station and its approaches.

In 1900, there were ten trains each weekday from Waterloo to Reading; by 1914 there were 14 and 18 in 1922. The services tended to be irregular, until the electrification of the inner suburban lines from Waterloo during 1915–16 brought a clock-face pattern to those services, in order to make it easy for people who did not understand timetables; the steam-hauled services, such as those to Reading, had to fit in (there were eight electric trains per hour on the Reading line as far as Barnes) and so became more regular.

During the Dunkirk evacuation (27 May-4 June 1940), 293 special trains arrived at Reading from the Channel ports, most of which were handed over to the GWR.

After the Second World War, there was only one train from Reading to London via the SER route, the 7.27am to London Bridge, which arrived at 9.49, and the 5.25pm return, arriving back at Reading at 7.59. Three coaches sufficed between Reading and Redhill; by 1960, six were required. The locomotive was normally a Schools class 4-4-0 based at Redhill.

At nationalisation, the Southern Railway effectively became the Southern Region of British Railways, and things continued more or less as before; but the station (originally named simply Reading) was renamed Reading South on 26 September 1949, to distinguish it from the adjacent Western Region (ex-GWR) station (which became Reading General at the same time).

=== Later years and closure ===
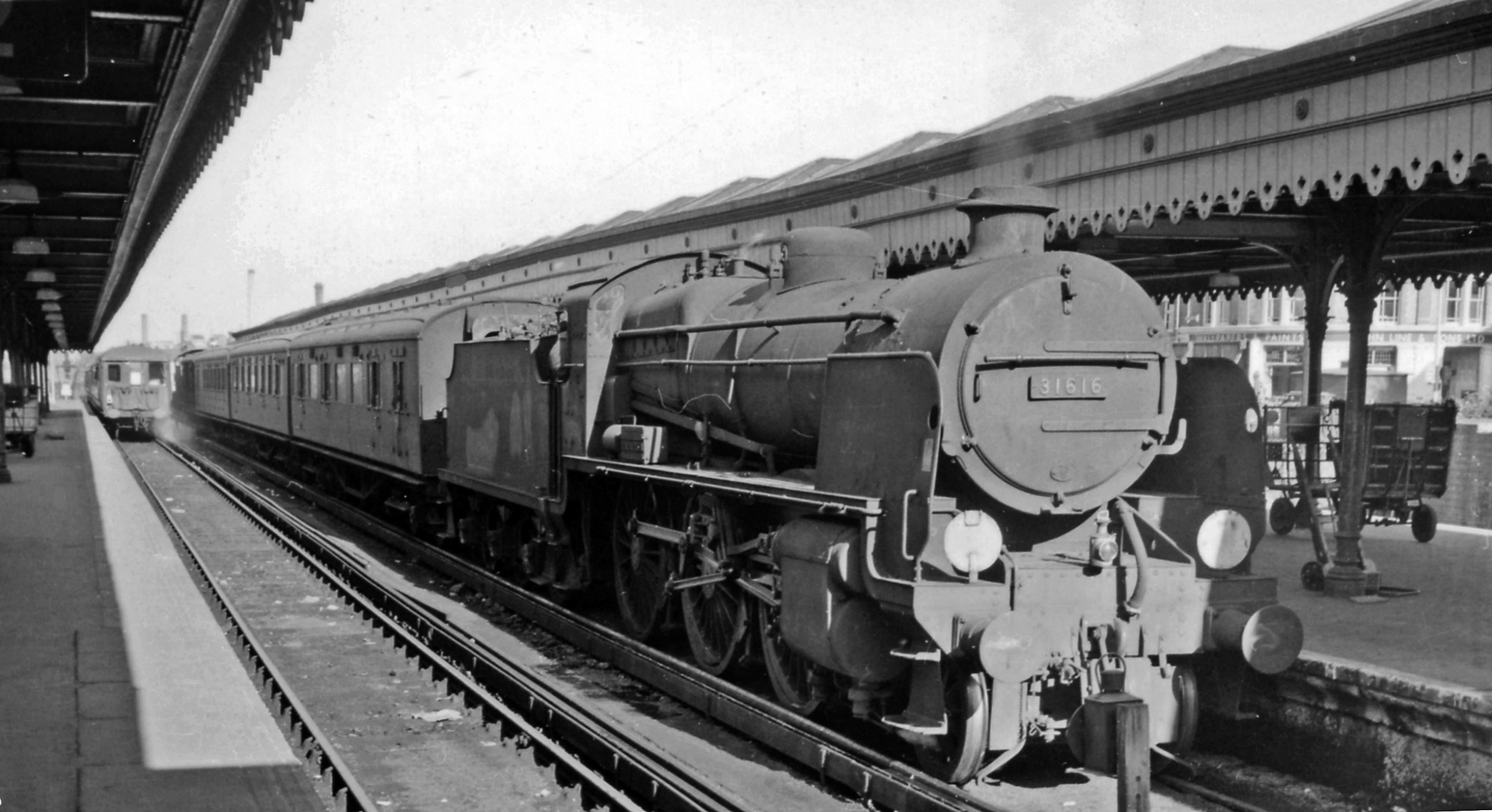
Reading Southern station, with U class 2-6-0 No. 31616 from Redhill 1962

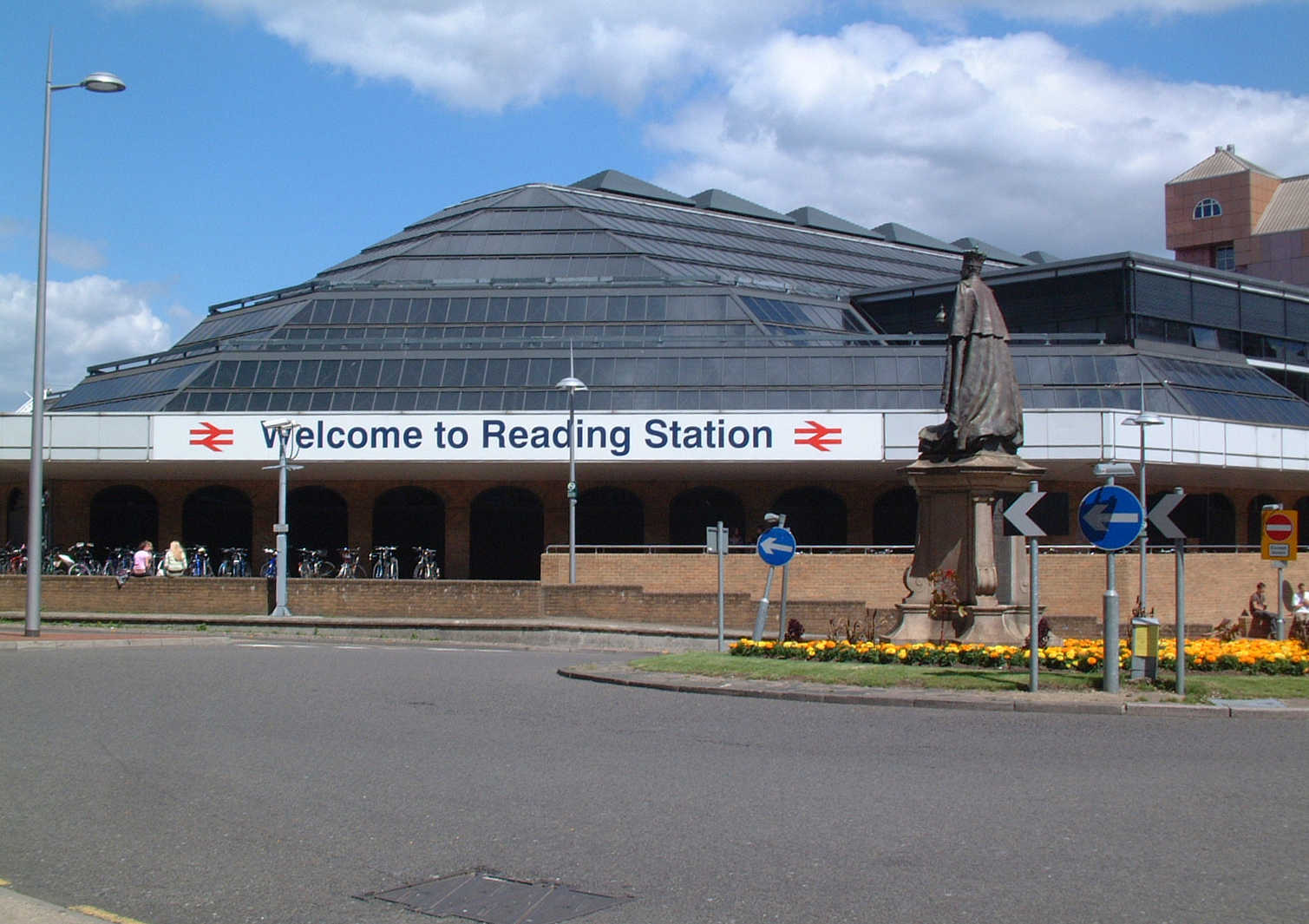
The 1989 concourse of Reading station now occupies the site of Reading Southern

Reading South was renamed again on 11 September 1961, becoming Reading Southern. The station remained independent of Reading General for several years following nationalisation, but was transferred to Western Region control in March 1965; within a few months the two stations shared a common station manager. Soon, the new management decided to spend £250,000 on improvements at Reading General, which included works to divert the Waterloo and Guildford services into the latter station, which would allow Southern station to be closed.

In the station's final arrangement, there were four platforms; east of Vastern Road were a locomotive depot on the north side of the line, and a goods shed and sidings on the south side.

The passenger station was closed on 6 September 1965, with services being diverted into Reading General; most (including all the electric services) then used a newly built platform 4A at the latter station, which was long enough for an eight-coach train. It was intended that the non-electric (Guildford line) services would use the older platforms at Reading General; but, in practice, these used platform 4A as well. Freight continued to be handled until September 1970, when all goods services were withdrawn except for the Huntley & Palmers biscuit traffic, which lasted until April 1979.

After demolition, the site of the passenger station was used as a car park for Reading General. In 1989, a new concourse for Reading station was built on the site. No trace now remains of the former SER station.

=== Connections between the SER and GWR routes ===
The first connection, 71 chains (1,400 m) in length, was laid in from some sidings on the north side of the GWR line, burrowing under that line, connecting with the SER line facing east; none of it was owned by the SER: the LSWR owned the easternmost 9 chains (180 m) and the GWR the remainder. It connected into the GWR main line to the west of the station, and since there were no platforms on the connection, it was primarily used for goods trains, being first used on 1 December 1858.

A second connection was built to the west of the first and was opened on 17 December 1899. This was quite steep.

A third connection to the east of the previous two was opened on 26 May 1941 and, like the second, allowed trains stopping in the GWR station to run to or from the SER line.

When the SER station closed in 1965, the connection built in 1899 was relaid to allow the services over the former SER line to run into the newly built platform 4A at Reading General.

=== Locomotive depot ===
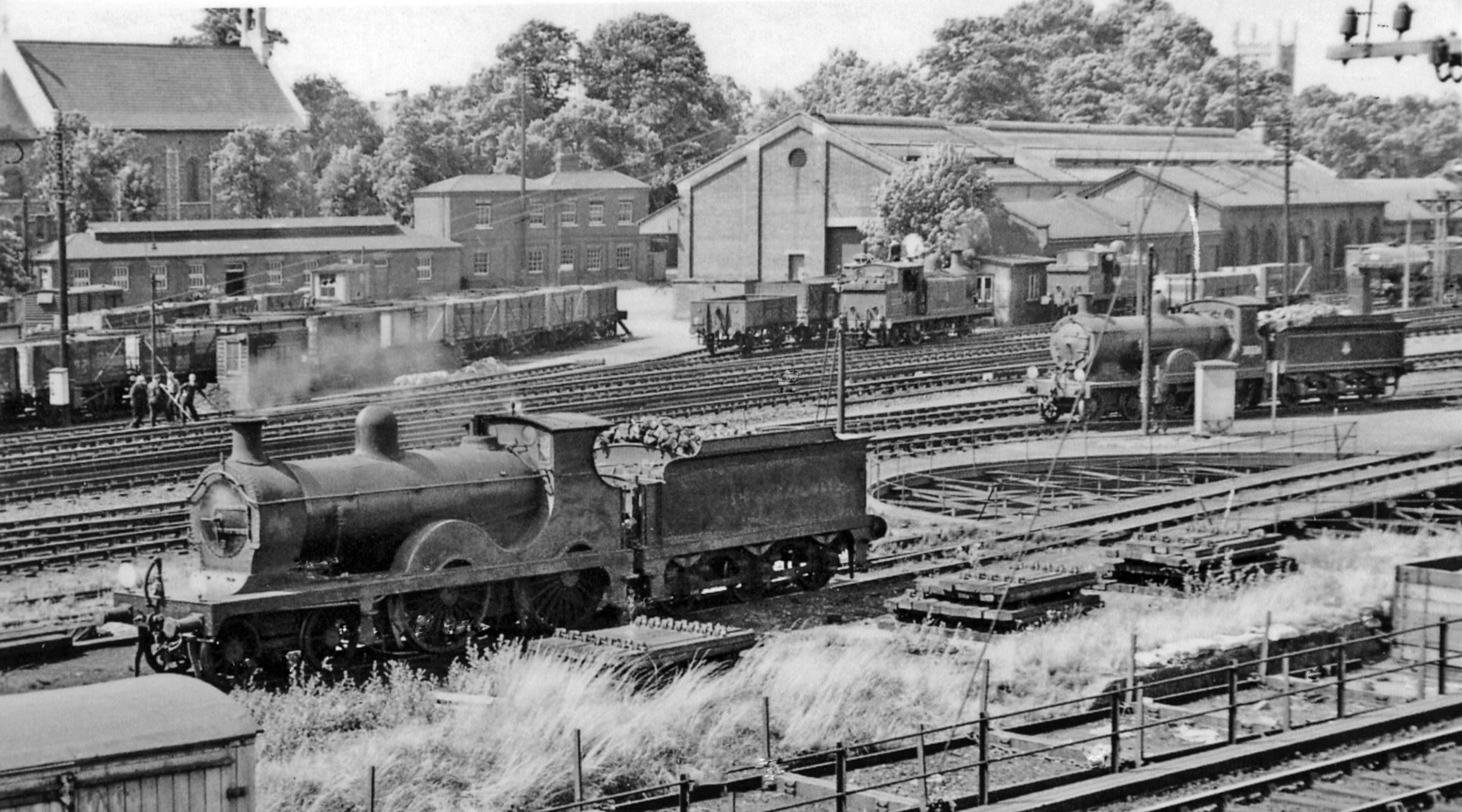
The yard and turntable at the approach to Reading South in 1952

The SER built an engine shed adjacent to the station in 1852. It was replaced by another structure in 1875 and was reroofed in the early 1950s. Like the station, it closed in 1965.

The 1875 depot was constructed on the north side of the line, situated to the east of Vastern Road between the SER and GWR lines. It had a brick-built shed, with three tracks; one of which was used by the LSWR. The 45-foot (14 m) turntable was replaced in 1926 by one of 65 feet (20 m) diameter. On 15 October 1898, the SER had 22 locomotives allocated to Reading. Normally, about twenty locomotives were based at Reading; the allocation fell from 22 to 17 upon electrification in 1939. Locomotive classes allocated in 1950 were mostly ex-SECR types: they included eight 2-6-0s of the SR U class; seven 4-4-0s, mostly of the SECR D class; and two 0-6-0T shunting engines of the SECR R1 class. The duties of the two tank engines included piloting the station, shunting the goods yard and banking goods trains up to Earley. Following nationalisation, the code 70E was allotted to Reading depot in 1950, which it retained until 1959, when it became a sub-shed of Basingstoke. The depot was reduced in importance in May 1954, when most of the locomotives were transferred away leaving just two shunting engines, but complete closure did not occur until January 1965.

=== Electrification ===
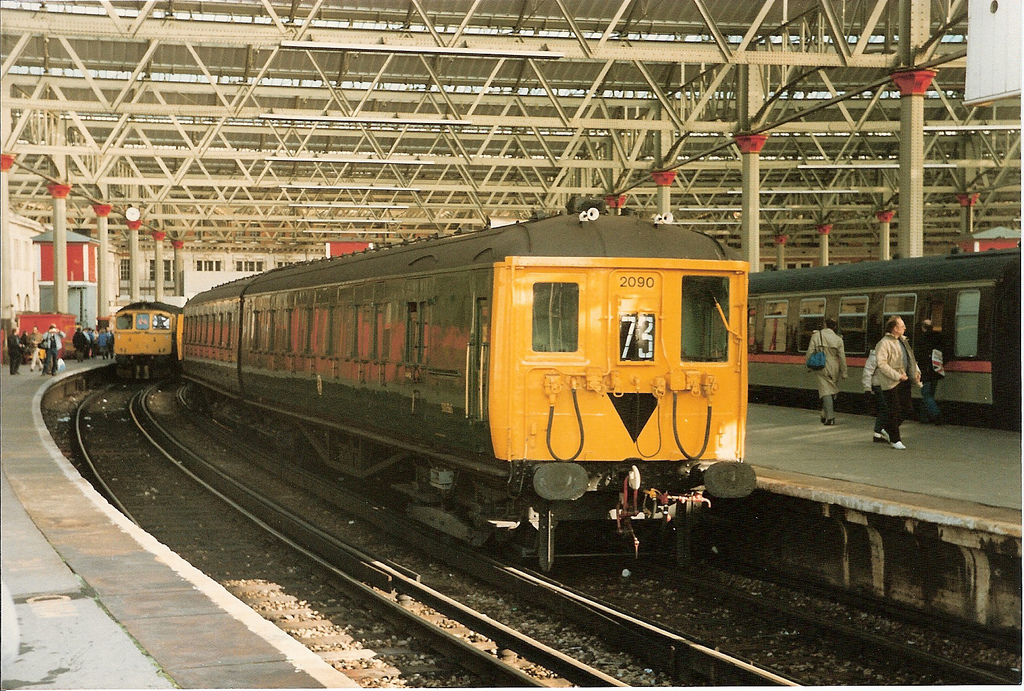
A 2-BIL unit; trains of this type were built for Reading-Waterloo services

Since 1903, the Southern Railway and its constituents had pursued a policy of electrification, which began with the routes closest to the London termini and gradually worked outwards. On the LSWR's Waterloo to Reading Line, electric trains had reached Wandsworth Town on 25 October 1915 and Twickenham on 30 January 1916; Hounslow was reached (the Hounslow Loop Line) on 12 March 1916. The policy was continued by the Southern Railway from 1923, and, on 6 July 1930, electrification was extended to Windsor, which included the Reading line as far as Staines. Electric trains reached Virginia Water on 3 January 1937 and, in that year, several electrification schemes were proposed by the Southern Railway, which included the route from Virginia Water to Reading. As part of these works, new berthing sidings were provided at Reading. The electric service from Waterloo to Reading was introduced on 1 January 1939; trains were every 20 minutes at peak times and every 30 minutes off-peak and on Sundays. Most trains ran non-stop between Waterloo and Staines, and on the outward journey they divided at Ascot (with one portion continuing to Guildford via Aldershot), whilst on the London-bound trip, the two portions would be combined again at Ascot. The total journey time from Waterloo to Reading was reduced from 90 minutes to 75.

New electric trains were built for these services, which consisted of two-coach units; up to four units could be coupled to make a train of up to eight coaches. Each coach of a unit had the seating in compartments, flanked by a driving cab at one end and a lavatory at the other. There was a side corridor (although there were no gangway connections between the coaches); this was to allow the passengers access to the lavatory. One of the coaches had both first- and third-class compartments, and seated 24 in first-class and 32 in third; the other coach had only third-class, seating 52, but also had a brake section for the guard and luggage, together with the traction motors. The units were known as the 2-BIL type.

The electric trains bore headcodes to inform both passengers and staff of the route, origin and destination of the train, but not necessarily the direction. Several were used: for example, in March 1939, trains running between Waterloo and Reading bore number 27 if running via Brentford, or 28 if running via Richmond. The main codes remained unchanged for several years, but there were occasional amendments particularly for special trains; in the 1950s, specials between Reading and Ascot were no. 18 and, in 1961, specials between Reading and Bognor or Littlehampton were no. 41 if running via Ascot, Aldershot, Guildford and Havant; or 42 if via Chertsey, Worplesdon and Havant. If the train was equipped to show only letters as headcodes instead of numbers, letter L was used for all services between Reading and Ascot or Waterloo; sometimes two dots or a bar above the letter would denote different destinations or routes.

The sidings at Reading were used to stable electric trains overnight and at off-peak hours; for example, in summer 1955, six 2-BIL units would be left in the sidings overnight.

=== Dieselisation ===
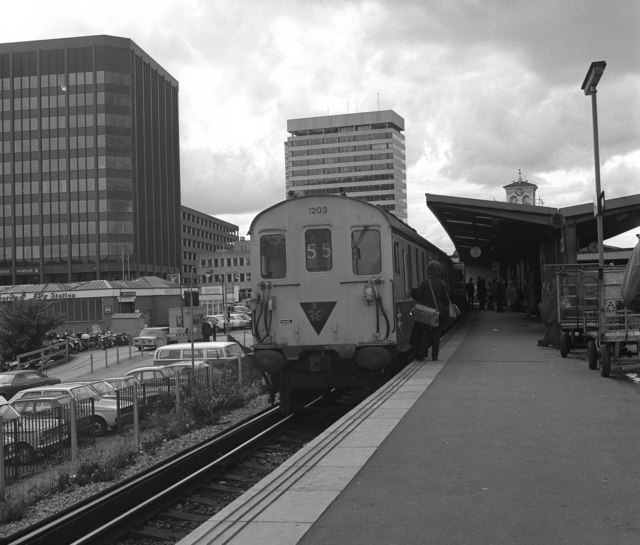
A Tadpole unit, narrow end toward camera. This is at platform 4B (now 5) of the present Reading station; the car park on the left occupies the site of Reading Southern station

Unlike the line to Waterloo via Bracknell, the North Downs Line to Redhill was not electrified beyond Wokingham, apart from short stretches shared with other routes. The first Beeching report recommended curtailing the passenger service at Guildford and the closure of all stations between Shalford and Betchworth inclusive. The second Beeching report recommended that the whole of the North Downs Line should be developed as a trunk route for freight services. The passenger service along the entire line was however reprieved, provided that costs could be reduced. The steam-hauled services were to be withdrawn, but money was not available for new diesel trains.

Instead, in 1964, six three-car trains were provided by putting together spare coaches from elsewhere on the network: twelve came from disbanded 6-S units on the Hastings line, six of which had diesel engines and driving cabs; there were also six driving trailers from 2-EPB electric trains available. One coach of each type was coupled together to form a three-car unit; these were officially designated the 3-R units, but were popularly known as Tadpoles because the former EMU driving trailer was noticeably wider than the two Hastings coaches.

The diesel service was introduced between Reading and Tonbridge on 4 January 1965. The Redhill line timetable was totally recast; there was no longer a London service and most services now ran all the way to Tonbridge. The service was second-class only, with a normal off-peak service interval of 60 minutes. Most trains consisted of one Tadpole unit, but a few services were operated using BRCW Type 3 diesel locomotives hauling three ordinary coaches.

== Accidents ==
On 12 September 1855, a light engine was sent from Reading to Guildford on the down line, even though it was to travel in the up direction. After running for about a mile, it collided with the 4.40 pm service from London Bridge to Reading, which was running correctly on the down line. The driver of the light engine and four passengers were killed; ten more were seriously injured, and three of those died later in hospital.

== Routes ==
Preceding station	Disused railways	Following station
Earley	Southern Railway; South Eastern Railway	Terminus

== See also ==
- Reading West railway station
