= SER R class =

Class of steam locomotives

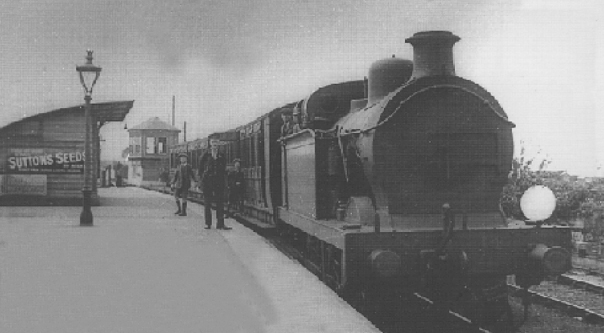
Type and origin
- Power type: Steam
- Designer: James Stirling
- Builder: Ashford Works
- Build date: 1888–1898
- Total produced: 25
Specifications
- Configuration
  - Whyte: 0-6-0T
  - UIC: C n2t
- Gauge: 4 ft 8 1/2 in (1,435 mm)
Career
- Operators: South Eastern Railway; → South Eastern and Chatham Railway; → Southern Railway
- Class: R
- Withdrawn: 1931–1943
- Disposition: 13 rebuilt as R1 class (see below); all scrapped

The SER R class was a class of 0-6-0T locomotives on the South Eastern Railway.

== History ==
For many years the South Eastern Railway (SER) had possessed very few locomotives designed for shunting. When trains were to be shunted, this was usually carried out any engine not in use at the time, which was often unsuitable as this caused delays to other trains that needed said engine.

Several other railways favoured the 0-6-0T wheel arrangement for shunting, and so in 1887 it was decided to introduce a class of 0-6-0T locomotives specifically for shunting and for hauling local goods trains. The R class locomotives were designed by James Stirling as a new class, and 25 were built at Ashford Works between 1888 and 1898. As was typical of Stirling's designs, several components were shared with existing designs; the domeless boilers were of the same type as was fitted to his O class 0-6-0 and Q class 0-4-4T.

Their SER numbers were scattered between 10 and 174, and in a continuous block from 335 to 342. These numbers were retained under the South Eastern and Chatham Railway, although from 1900 the livery changed from black to green.

Table of orders and numbers
Year	Quantity	SER Nos.
1888	4	335–338
1889	4	339–342
1890	3	10, 77, 147
1892	6	124, 128, 152–154, 174
1895	4	47, 125–127
1898	4	69, 70, 107, 155

The three 1890 locomotives (nos. 10, 77, 147) were built with short chimneys giving an overall height of 11 ft 6 in (3.51 m) to give sufficient clearance for working the Whitstable branch, which had a low tunnel. Normally, two would work the branch from Canterbury West shed whilst the third was spare at Ashford, but to provide relief for the 1890 locomotives when one was undergoing overhaul, no. 124 was also given a short chimney in March 1893.

Three of the 1892 locomotives were built for the Folkestone Harbour Branch, where the existing locomotives, Mansell 0-6-0T nos. 152–154, were only fourteen years old, but required several modifications in order to comply with Board of Trade regulations regarding passenger trains. In particular they needed to be equipped with the automatic vacuum brake which would itself require the locomotives to have stronger frames. Their boilers would also become due for replacement soon, and it was decided that the provision of three new R class locomotives would be more economic, and these took the same numbers as the locomotives that they replaced, which were scrapped. R class nos. 152–154 were transferred to other parts of the SER system in 1898, and were replaced on the Folkestone Harbour Branch by newly-built nos. 69, 70 and 107.

=== R1 class ===
SECR R1 class
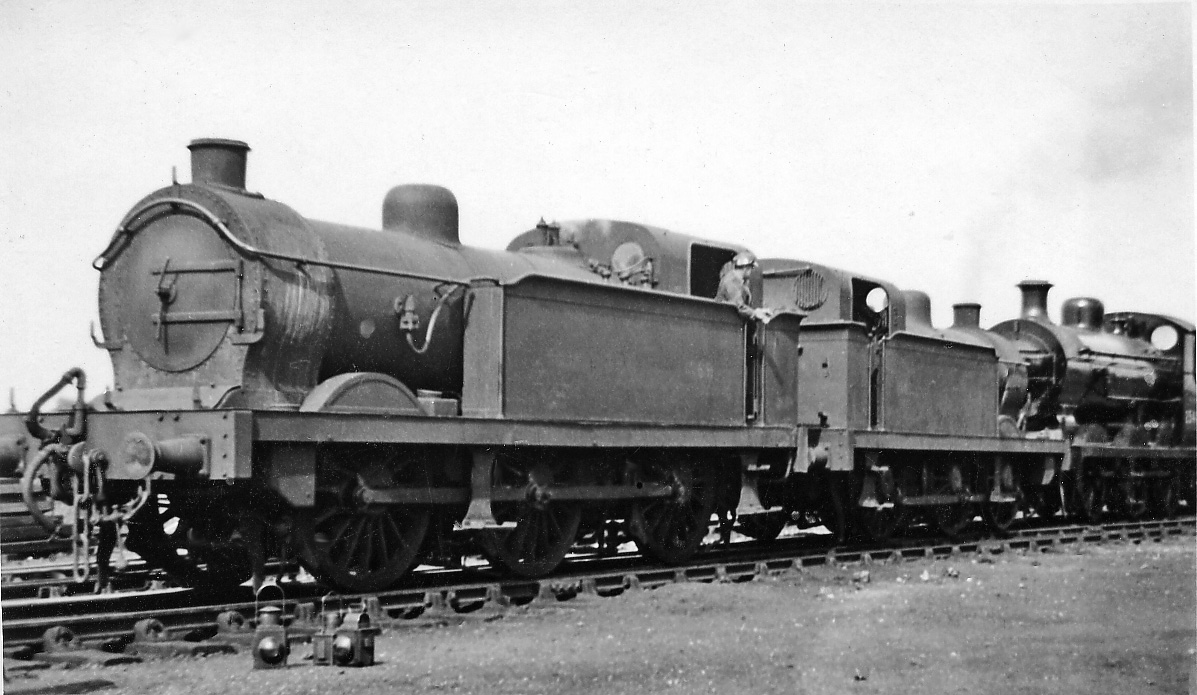
- Two R1 locomotives 1069 and 1147 at Ashford 1946. These have been cut down to operate on the restrictive Canterbury & Whitstable line
Type and origin
- Only differences from R class are shown
- Power type: Steam
- Rebuild date: 1910–1922
- Number rebuilt: 13
Specifications
Career
- Operators: South Eastern and Chatham Railway; → Southern Railway; → Southern Region of British Railways
- Class: SECR/SR: R1
- Withdrawn: 1949–1960
- Disposition: All scrapped

Between 1910 and 1922, 13 of the SER R class 0-6-0T were rebuilt by the SECR with Wainwright-design domed boilers of the same type as were used on the SECR H class 0-4-4T. These rebuilds were classified R1, but their capabilities and duties did not change substantially.

Table of rebuilding to R1 class
Year	Quantity	SECR Nos.
1910	1	69
1911	1	339
1912	2	147, 154
1913	4	10, 47, 128, 340
1914	3	107, 127, 174
1915	1	335
1922	1	337

=== Renumbering ===
Many of the locomotives were renumbered up to three times: from 1924 the Southern Railway (SR) applied the prefix "A", i.e. A10 etc., the work being completed in 1927; from 1931 the SR dropped the "A" and increased the numbers by 1000 (i.e. 1010 etc.); and from 1948, under British Railways, the numbers were further increased by 30000, becoming 31010 etc.

=== Withdrawal ===
One R class locomotive (no. 341) was withdrawn in 1914 due to accident damage. The other 11 locomotives which had not been rebuilt to the R1 class were withdrawn between 1931 and 1943. Of the 13 R1 class rebuilds, one was withdrawn in 1949, two in 1955, three in 1958 and five in 1959; after August 1959, only nos. 31047 and 31337 were left, and these were withdrawn in March and February 1960 respectively.

Table of withdrawals
Year	R class in service at start of year	R1 class in service at start of year	Quantity withdrawn	Locomotive numbers	Notes
1931	11	13	1	1342	
1932	10	13	1	1077	
1934	9	13	3	1126, 1152, 1338	
1935	6	13	1	1153	
1937	5	13	1	1125	
1939	4	13	1	1155	
1941	3	13	1	1336	
1942	2	13	1	1070	
1943	1	13	1	1124	
1949	0	13	1	1127	
1955	—	12	2	31154, 31335	
1958	—	10	2	31069, 31147	
1959	—	8	6	31010, 31107, 31128, 31174, 31339, 31340	
1960	—	2	2	31047, 31337	

== Models ==
The Hornby Dublo range of 00 gauge model railways had been launched by Meccano Ltd in 1938 using a three-rail system to power the electric motors of the locomotives. After World War II, several of their rivals chose a two-rail system and by 1957 Hornby Dublo began to lose sales. Accordingly, they decided to develop a two-rail system, and this was launched in 1959. Among the new items designed especially for the two-rail launch was a model of the SECR R1 class 0-6-0T; this was moulded in polystyrene, which was coloured either black (with running number 31337) or green (as number 31340), both carrying the contemporary BR emblem; it has been stated that the two running numbers were carefully chosen to match the numbers of the last two in service, but in fact at the time of the withdrawal of 31340, there were still six others in service. They were announced in Meccano Magazine in September 1960, and remained in production until the collapse of the Meccano group in 1964.
