= SECR J class =

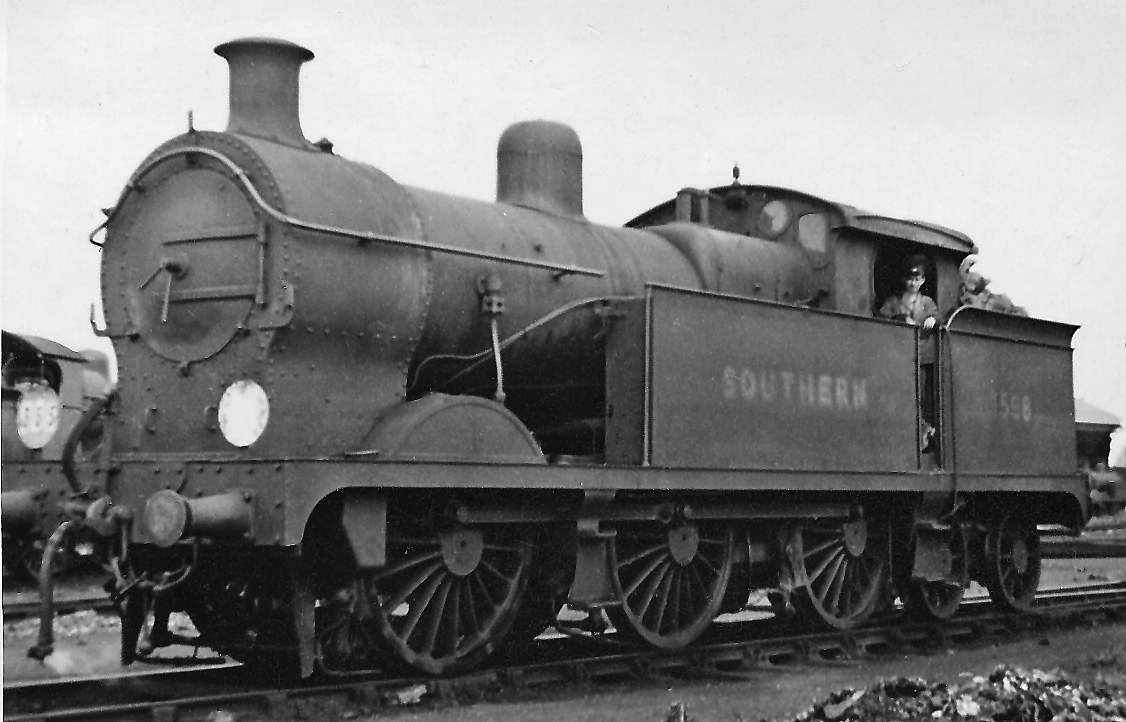
- J class 1598 at Ashford 1946
Type and origin
- Power type: Steam
- Designer: Harry Wainwright
- Builder: Ashford Works
- Build date: 1913
- Total produced: 5
Specifications
- Configuration
  - Whyte: 0-6-4T
  - UIC: C2′ h2t
- Gauge: 4 ft 8 1/2 in (1,435 mm)
- Driver dia.: 5 ft 6 in (1.676 m)
- Trailing dia.: 3 ft 7 in (1.092 m)
- Axle load: 18 long tons 14 cwt (41,900 lb or 19 t)
- Adhesive weight: 51 long tons 18 cwt (116,300 lb or 52.7 t)
- Loco weight: 70 long tons 14 cwt (158,400 lb or 71.8 t)
- Fuel type: Coal
- Fuel capacity: 3 long tons 5 cwt (7,300 lb or 3.3 t)
- Water cap.: 2,000 imp gal (9,100 L; 2,400 US gal)
- Firebox
  - Grate area: 17.6 sq ft (1.64 m^{2})
- Boiler pressure: 160 lbf/in^{2} (1.10 MPa)
- Heating surface
  - Firebox: 112 sq ft (10.4 m^{2})
  - Tubes: 593 sq ft (55.1 m^{2})
  - Flues: 294 sq ft (27.3 m^{2})
- Superheater
  - Type: Schmidt
  - Heating area: 234 sq ft (21.7 m^{2})
- Cylinders: Two, inside
- Cylinder size: 19 1/2 in × 26 in (495 mm × 660 mm)
- Valve type: 8-inch (203 mm) piston valves
Performance figures
- Tractive effort: 20,400 lbf (90.74 kN)
Career
- Operators: South Eastern and Chatham Railway; → Southern Railway; → Southern Region of British Railways
- Class: SECR / SR: J
- Withdrawn: 1949–1951
- Disposition: All scrapped

The SECR J class was a class of 0-6-4T steam tank locomotive built for heavy freight service on the South Eastern and Chatham Railway, by Harry Wainwright.

== History ==
The South Eastern and Chatham Railway (SECR) had a need for versatile mixed traffic locomotives which could accelerate quickly so as not to impede the heavy passenger traffic on the densely used lines around London. Following the success of his C class 0-6-0 and his H class 0-4-4T Harry Wainwright sought to combine their good features but was limited by weight restrictions on many lines. The result was an 0-6-4 tank. Five locomotives were constructed at Ashford during 1913, but Wainwright retired soon afterwards and no more were constructed. The class were moderately successful on a variety of secondary passenger and freight services. All had completed more than one million miles at the time of their withdrawal between 1949 and 1951.

== Numbering ==
The class were originally allocated unused numbers between 126 and 614. However, all but number 597 were renumbered by the Southern Railway in 1927/8 to create a unified sequence from A595 to A599. These later became 1595–1599, and then 31595–31599 under British Railways.

== Locomotive Summary ==
J class locomotive fleet summary
SECR No.	SR No.	BR No.	Date Delivered	Date Withdrawn
129	A596	31596	October 1913	September 1951
207	A595	31595	October 1913	April 1951
597	A597	31597	November 1913	October 1950
611	A598	31598	November 1913	December 1950
614	A599	31599	December 1913	November 1949

== Sources ==
- Bradley, D. L. (1980). The locomotive history of the South Eastern and Chatham Railway. London: Railway Correspondence and Travel Society. ISBN 0-901115-49-5.
