= Earley railway station =

Railway station serving Earley, Berkshire, England

Coordinates: 51.441°N 0.918°W

Earley
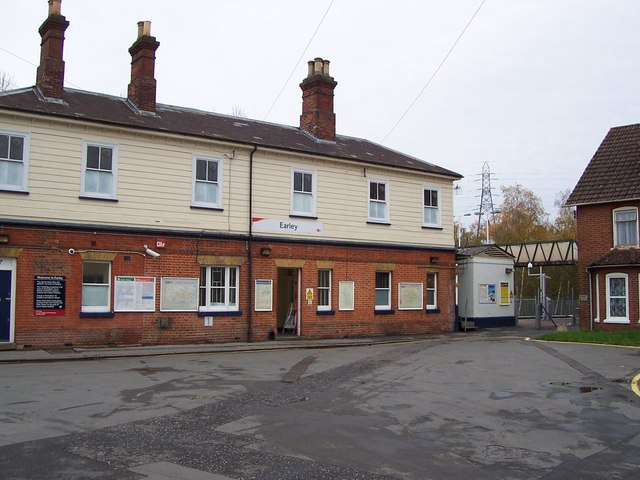
- Entrance to Earley Station

General information
- Location: Earley, Wokingham; England
- Grid reference: SU752718
- Manager: South Western Railway
- Platforms: 2

Other information
- Station code: EAR
- Classification: DfT category D

History
- Opened: November 1863
- Original company: South Eastern Railway
- Pre-grouping: South Eastern Railway
- Post-grouping: Southern Railway

Passengers
- 2020/21: ▼0.109 million
- 2021/22: ▲0.280 million
- 2022/23: ▲0.351 million
- 2023/24: ▲0.383 million
- 2024/25: ▲0.426 million
Location
- Location within Reading, Berkshire
Notes
- Passenger statistics from the Office of Rail & Road

Earley railway station serves the Berkshire town of Earley, England. It is 66 miles 1 chain (66.01 mi; 106.2 km) down the line from London Charing Cross via Redhill. It is on the Waterloo to Reading Line, and forms the last stop before the terminus of the line at Reading.

The station has two side platforms, on either side of the twin track line. A large two-storey station building is situated on the Reading-bound (westernmost) platform. The two platforms are linked by a footbridge over the tracks, and the London-bound platform has a waiting room. The station is accessed by an approach road from the nearby main road between Reading and Wokingham, and on this approach is a terrace of three single storey cottages that were built for the South Eastern Railway at the same time as the station, to house railway staff and their families.

== History ==
The South Eastern Railway (SER) opened Earley station in November 1863 on the former Reading, Guildford and Reigate Railway (RG&RR), which originally terminated at its own Reading Southern station. The RG&RR had opened on 4 July 1849 and the SER had taken it over in 1852.

By the time Earley station opened, the Staines, Wokingham & Woking Junction Railway (SW&WJR) was also operating a service between London Waterloo and Reading Southern station that used running powers over the SER through Earley station. The SW&WJR was absorbed by the London and South Western Railway (L&SWR) in 1878, and the L&SWR continued to operate over SER tracks until both railway companies became part of the Southern Railway in 1923.

In 1939, the line through Earley station was electrified, on the DC third rail system, as part of the electrification of the Reading to London Waterloo service. Trains on the original SER route to Guildford and Reigate continued to be steam hauled.

In 1948, the Southern Railway and the Great Western Railway (GWR), which also served Reading, were nationalised and merged with other newly nationalised railways to create British Railways. As a result of British Railways' 1955 Modernisation Plan, diesel traction replaced steam on the non-electrified services through Earley. In 1965, Reading Southern station closed, and the service was diverted into the adjacent, former GWR, Reading station.

== Services ==
All services at Earley are operated by South Western Railway.

The typical off-peak service in trains per hour is:

- 2 tph to London Waterloo via Richmond
- 2 tph to Reading

Additional services call at the station during the peak hours.

Preceding station	National Rail	Following station
Winnersh Triangle	South Western Railway Waterloo to Reading Line	Reading

== Gallery ==
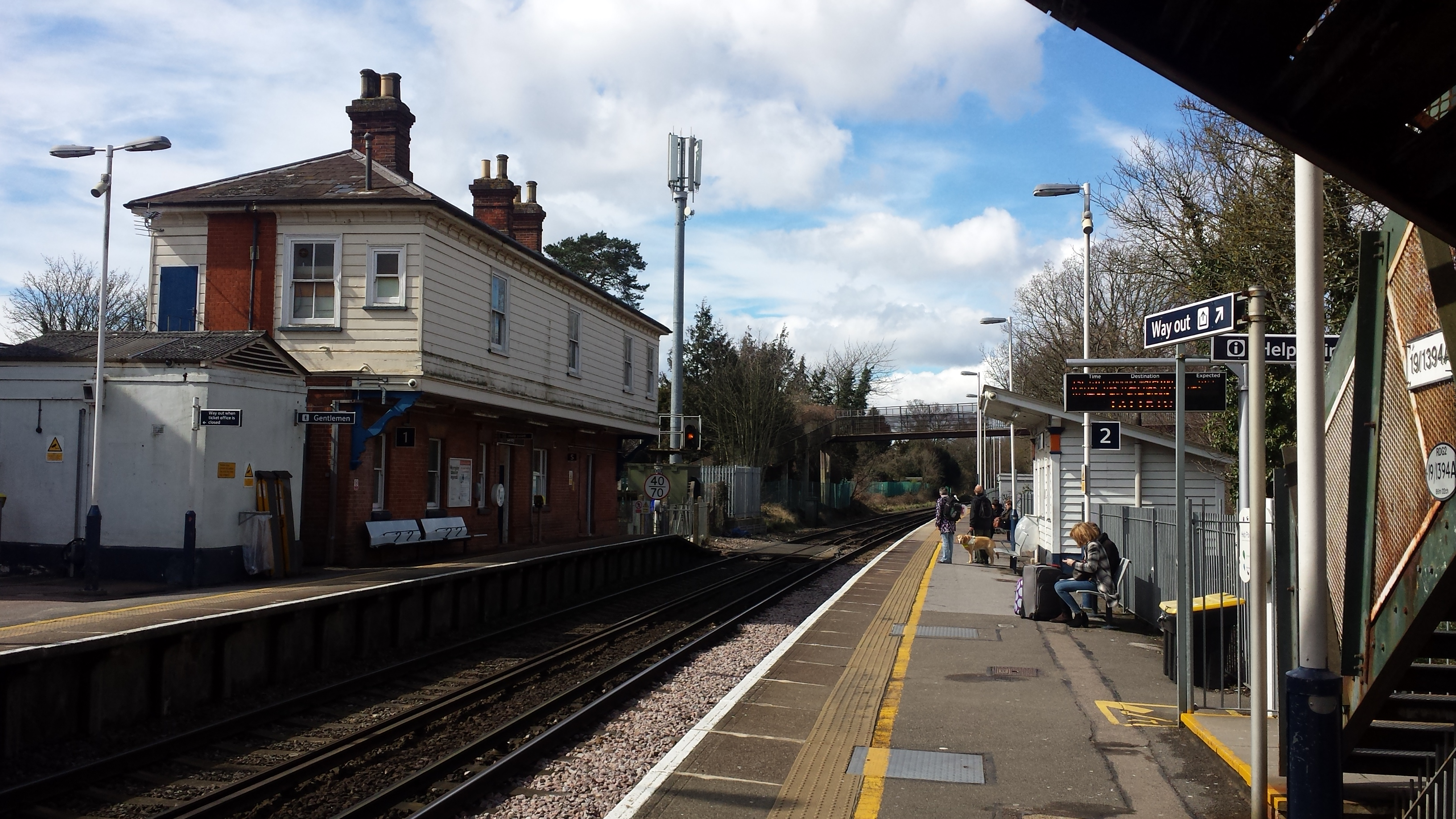
The station looking towards Reading from the London bound platform

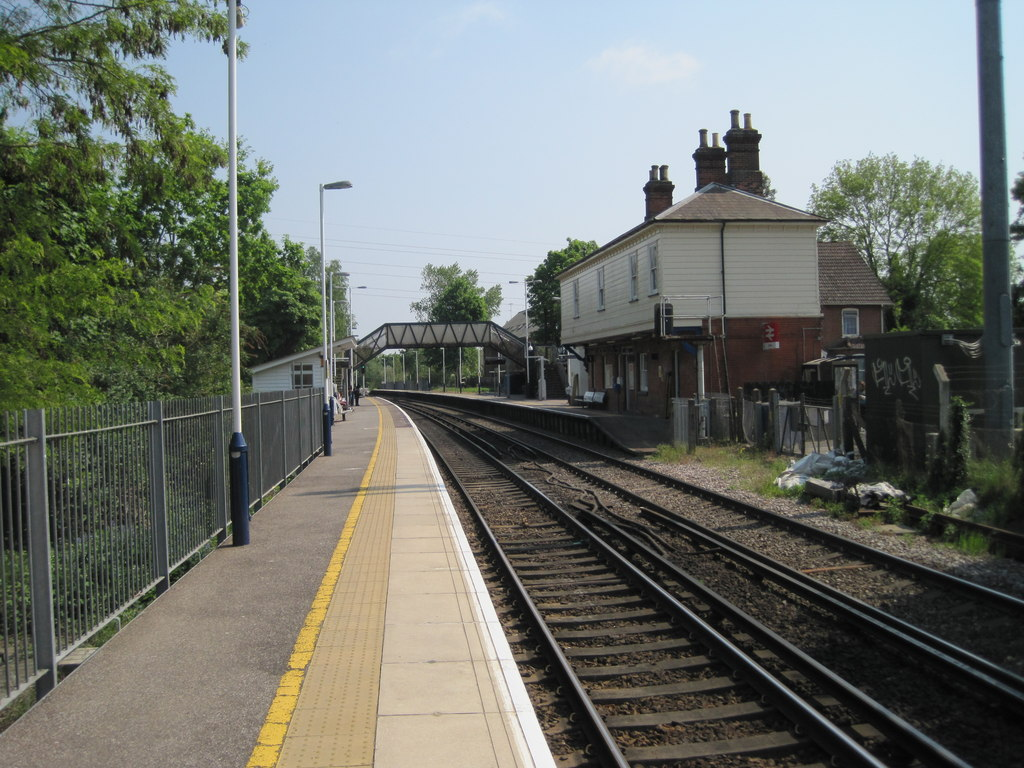
The station looking towards London from the London bound platform

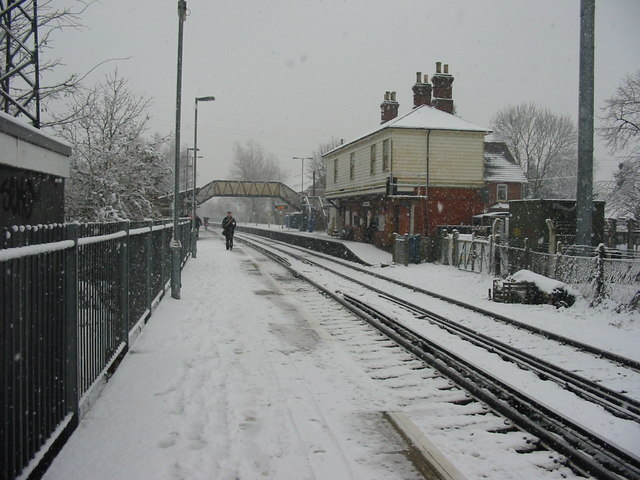
The station in snow, in February 2007

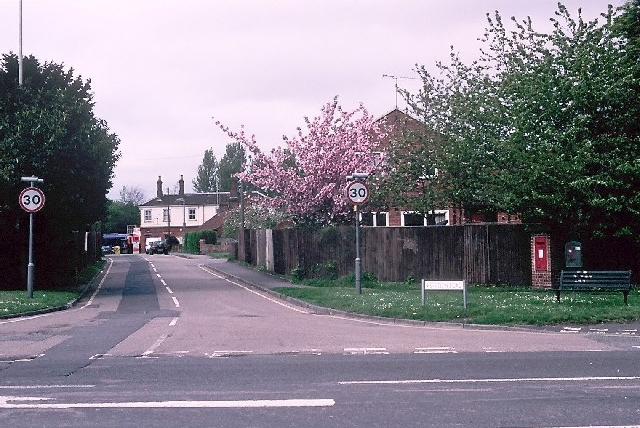
The station approach viewed from the main road between Reading and Wokingham

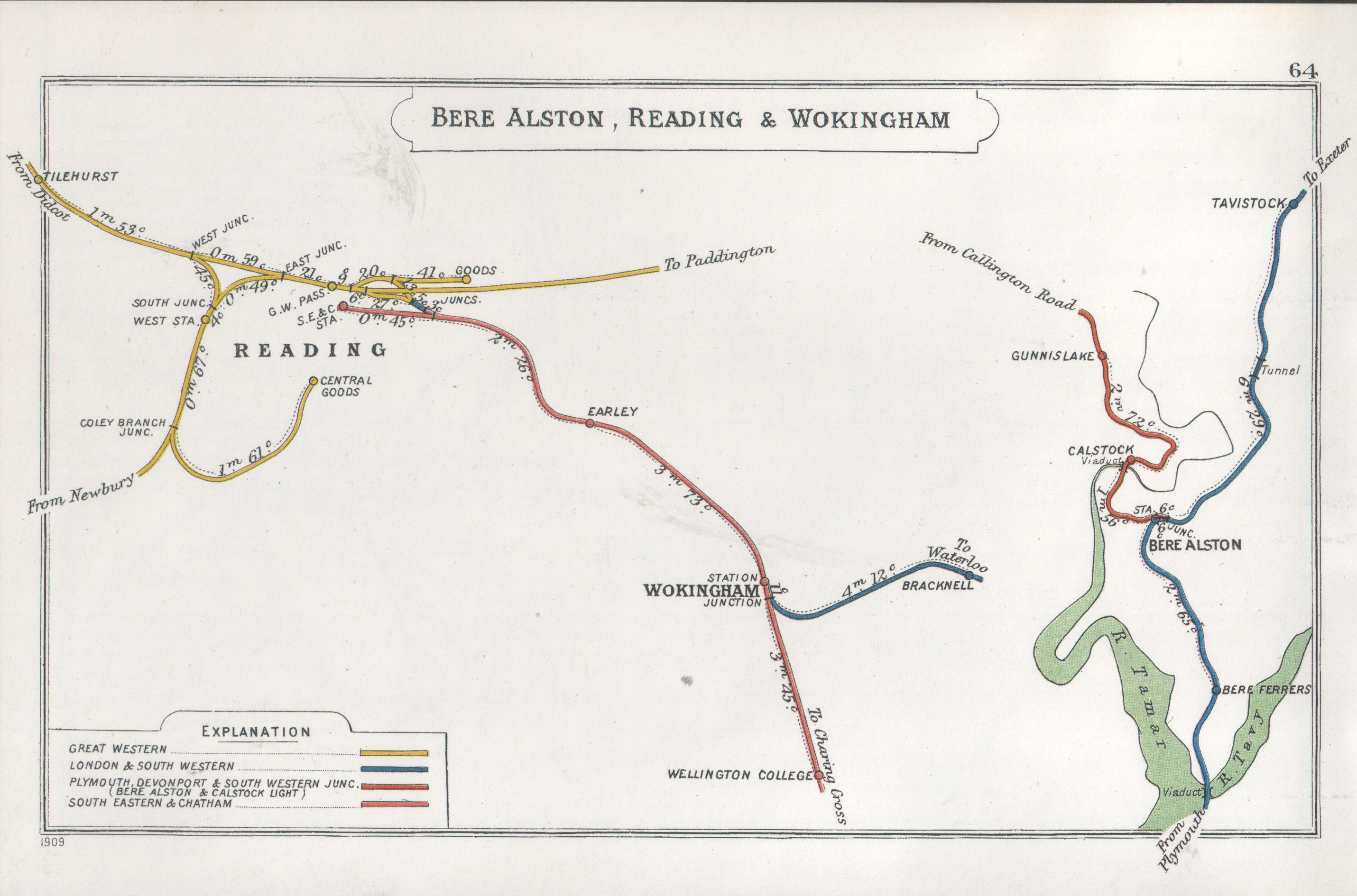
A 1909 Railway Clearing House map of lines around Reading

== Bibliography ==
- Butt, R.V.J. (1995). The Directory of Railway Stations. Yeovil: Patrick Stephens Ltd. ISBN 1-85260-508-1. R508.
- Kidner, R.W. (1982) [1974]. The Reading to Tonbridge Line. Locomotion Papers (3rd ed.). Salisbury: The Oakwood Press. ISSN 0305-5493. LP79.
- Matthews, Rupert (2006). Lost Railways of Berkshire. Newbury: Countryside Books. ISBN 1-85306-990-6.
- Mitchell, Vic; Smith, Keith (1989). Branch lines around Ascot (1st ed.). Midhurst: Middleton Press. ISBN 978-0-906520-64-2.
- Nock, O.S. (1971) [1961]. The South Eastern and Chatham Railway. Shepperton: Ian Allan Publishing. ISBN 0-7110-0268-1.
