= Ashford railway works =

Railway workshops in Ashford, Kent, UK

Coordinates: 51.1386°N 0.8830°E

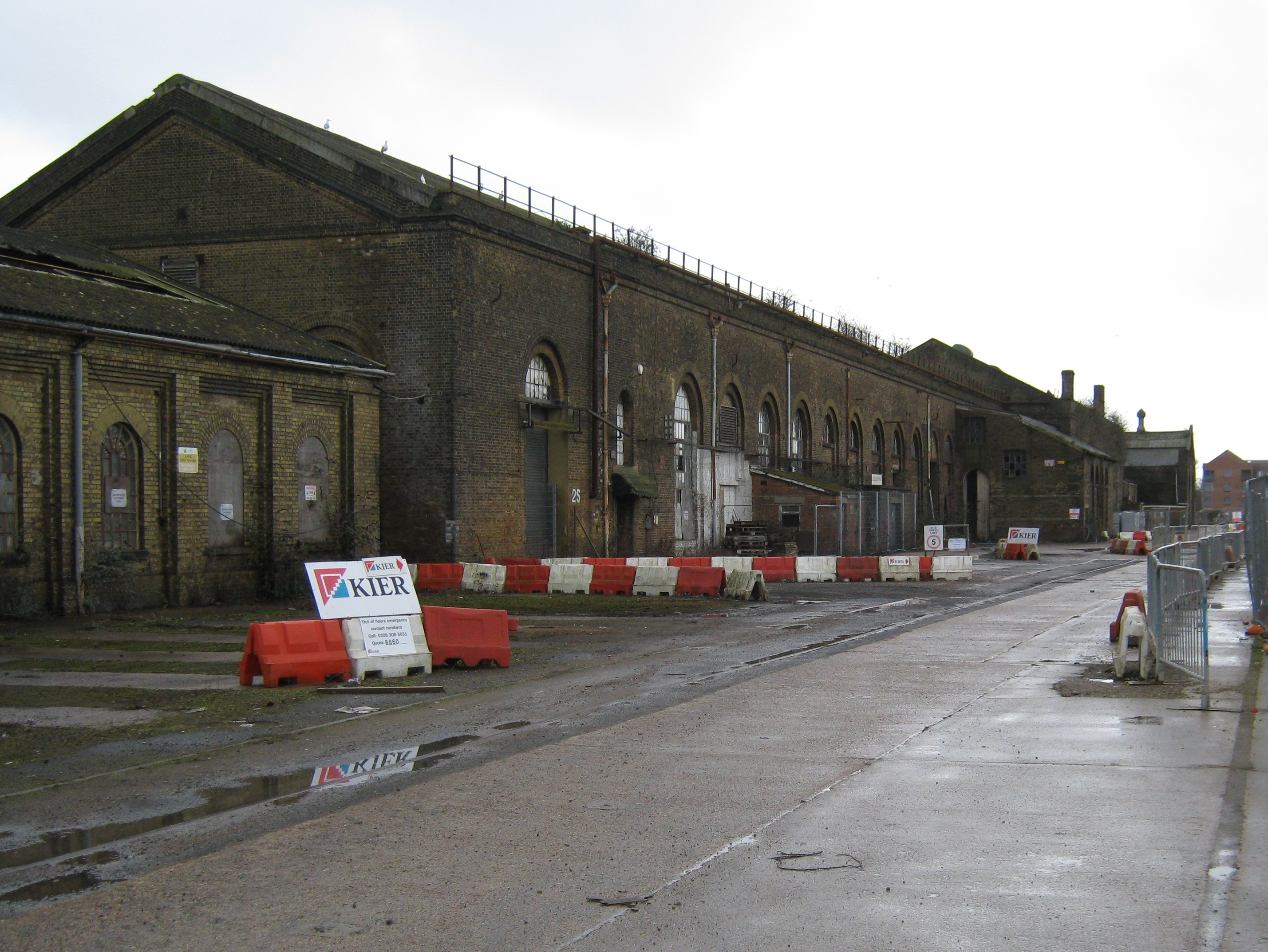

Ashford railway works was a major locomotive and wagon construction and repair workshop in Ashford, Kent in England. Constructed by the South Eastern Railway in 1847, it became a major centre for railway works in the 19th and early 20th centuries. After years of decline, it closed in 1982.

== History ==
=== South Eastern Railway ===
Ashford locomotive works was built by the South Eastern Railway on a new 185-acre (75 ha) site in 1847, replacing an earlier locomotive repair facility at New Cross in London. By 1850 over 130 houses had been built for staff (called Alfred Town by the railway but New Town by everybody else). The works employed about 600 people in 1851 increasing to about 950 by 1861, and around 1,300 by 1882. A carriage and wagon works was opened on an adjacent 32-acre (13 ha) site in 1850. The works led Ashford to be the largest industrial town in east Kent.

=== South Eastern and Chatham Railway ===
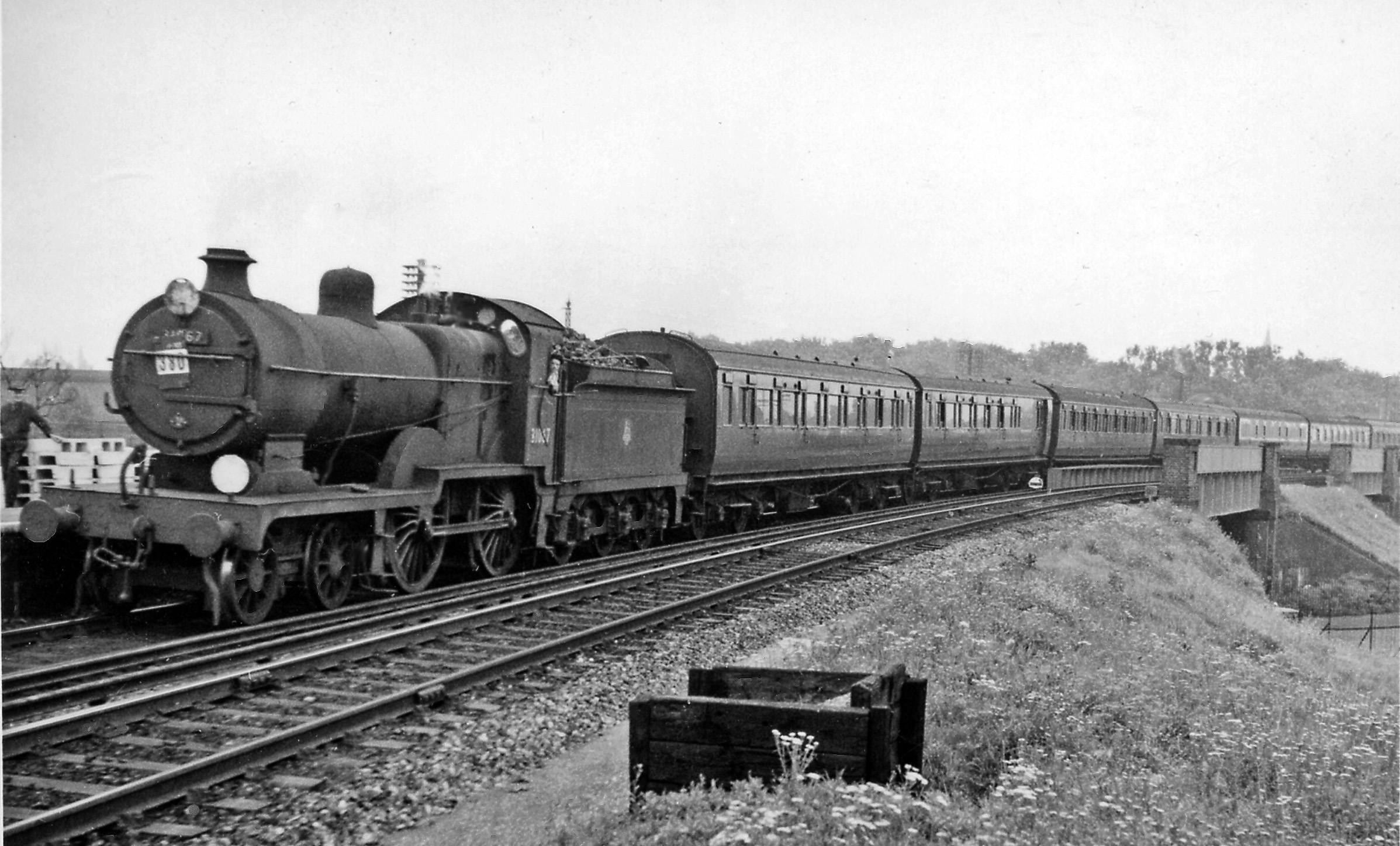
Up Holiday express from Ramsgate entering Margate station

On 1 January 1899, the railway entered into a working union with the London Chatham and Dover Railway, forming the South Eastern and Chatham Railway (SECR). Each antecedent company had its own locomotive works, but Ashford was larger than Longhedge works and so became the principal locomotive works for the new organisation. The latter facility was gradually run down and converted into a subsidiary works. The N class 2-6-0 locomotive was first constructed at Ashford in 1917, using a design by Richard Maunsell.

=== Southern Railway and British Railways ===
Following the grouping of the SECR with the London, Brighton and South Coast Railway and the London and South Western Railway to form the Southern Railway on 1 January 1923, most new locomotive and carriage design and construction was transferred to both Ashford and Eastleigh Works. Ashford continued to operate both building and servicing locomotives and wagons until well after the nationalisation of the railways to form British Railways in 1948.

The locomotive workshops eventually closed on 16 June 1962, the last locomotive to be repaired at Ashford being the N class-2-6-0 no. 31400 on 9 June. The wagon works continued for a further two decades producing continental ferry vans, Freightliner vehicles, merry-go-round coal hopper wagons and the Cartic4 articulated car transporter. It became one of British Rail Engineering Limited's main wagon works, but as trade declined, primarily the construction of wagons for export markets, it operated on an ever-decreasing scale until it closed down in 1982.

=== Redevelopment ===
The site has sat derelict since closure. Ashford International Studios, a multimedia studio, commercial and residential complex, is planned to be built on the site with opening scheduled for 2026.

== Motive power depot ==
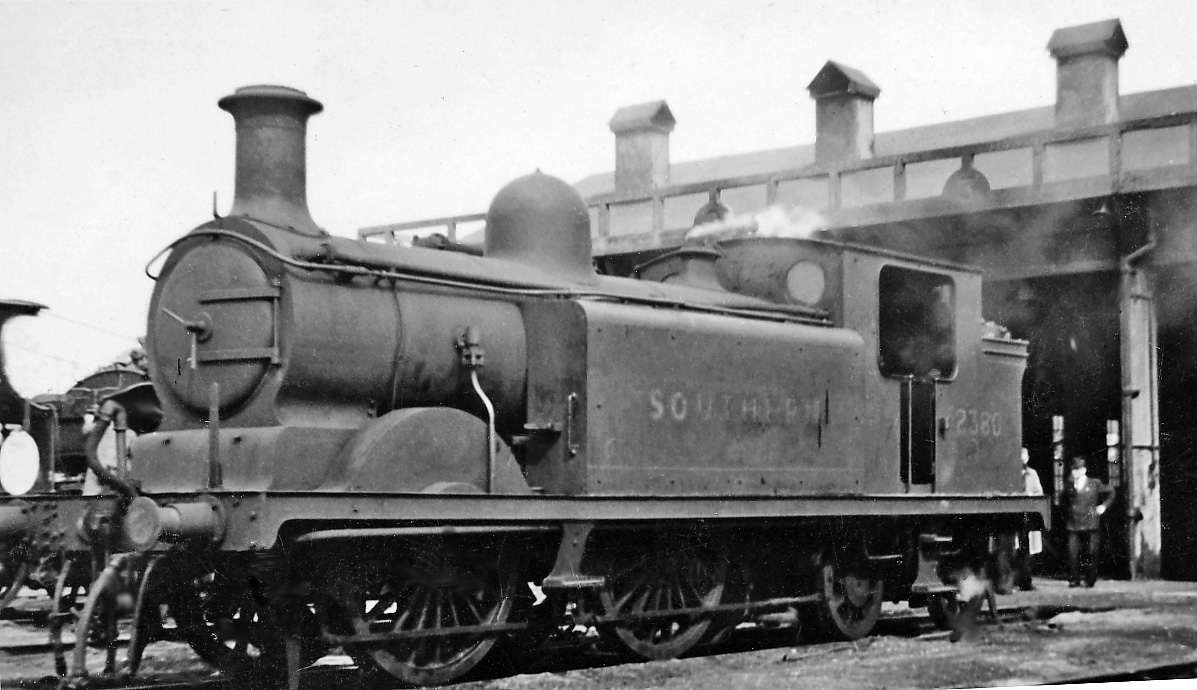
Ex-LB&SCR D3/M No. 2380 at Ashford Locomotive Depot 7 July 1946

The SER opened a locomotive depot at Ashford in December 1842, sited to the East of the station adjacent to the works. This was demolished in 1931, when the SR built a much larger facility on the other side of the main line. This was closed to steam locomotives in 1962, but used to service diesels until 1968. Thereafter it was used for the Ashford Steam Centre for a period, but has now been demolished.

== Locomotive building at Ashford ==
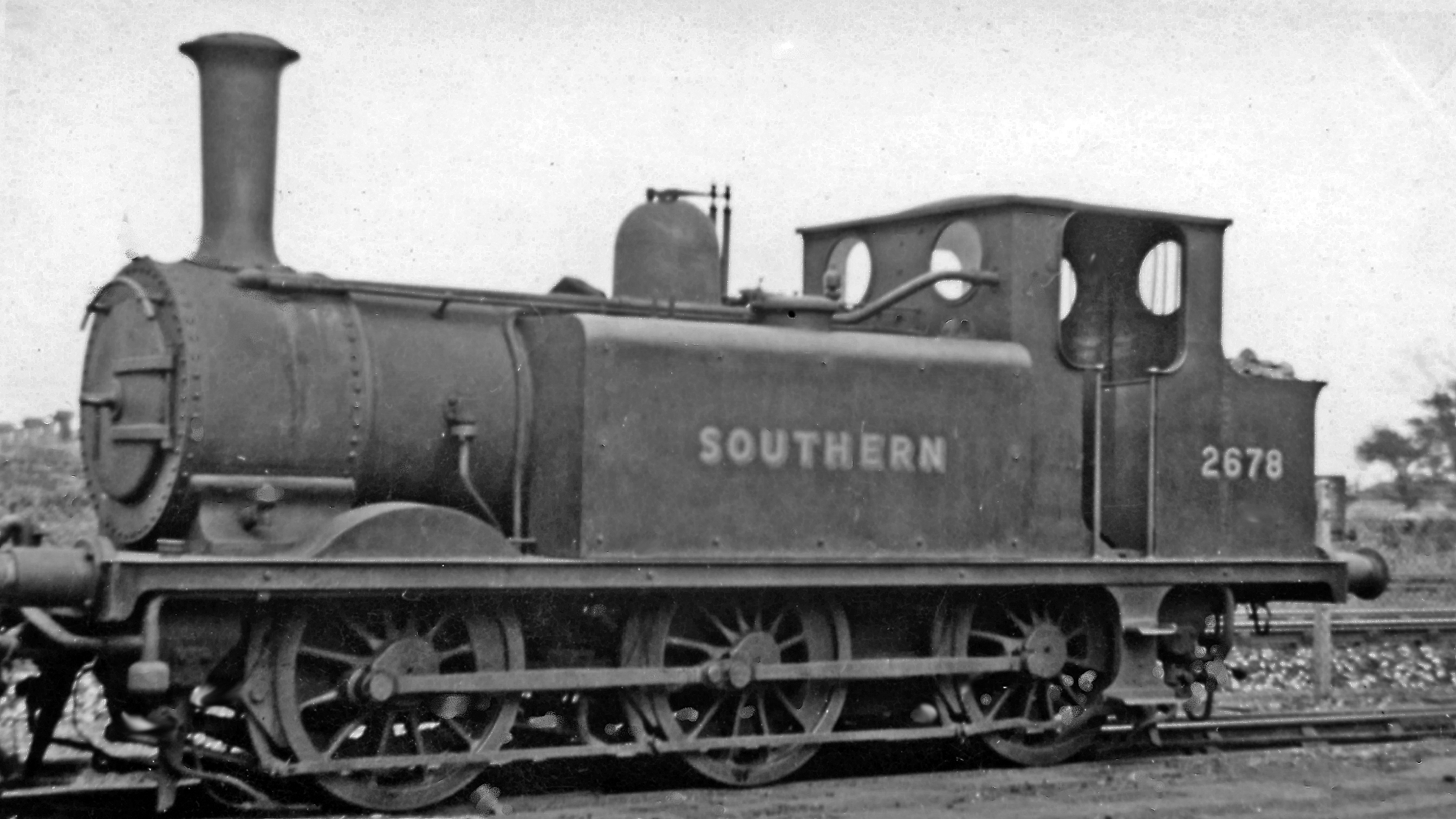
Ex-LB&SCR A1X 0-6-0T at Ashford Locomotive Depot

In 1853 the Locomotive Superintendent James I. Cudworth built the first of ten 'Hastings' class 2-4-0 locomotives there. In 1855 these were followed by two freight engines. (An unusual feature of these was a dual firebox, each side fired alternately.) Over the next twenty years, Cudworth built 53 freight locomotives at Ashford and around 80 larger ones with six foot driving wheels, plus the first eight of his sixteen express passenger locos, the 'Mails', with seven foot drivers. He also produced four classes of 0-6-0 tank locomotives.

In 1878 James Stirling, the brother of Patrick Stirling of the Great Northern Railway took over and introduced a deal of standardisation. He believed in the benefits of the bogie and produced a class of 4-4-0 with six foot drivers and his '0' class freight with five foot drivers. He also produced over a hundred 0-4-4 tank engines, and in 1898 the 4-4-0 'B' Class.

The first Locomotive, Carriage & Wagon Superintendent for the South Eastern and Chatham Railway was H.S. Wainwright who produced a series of successful and elegant designs at Ashford. Wainwright's tender engines built at Ashford included 0-6-0 freight locomotives of the 'C' class, and the 4-4-0 passenger engines of the 'D' and 'E' classes. His tank engines built at the works included the versatile and long-lived 0-4-4 'H' class, the larger 0-6-4 'J' class and the diminutive 0-6-0 tank engines of the 'P' class. Wainwright was followed by Richard Maunsell, who introduced the ultimately unsuccessful 'K' class 2-6-4 mixed traffic tank locomotives (which were later rebuilt into 2-6-0 tender locomotives), and the useful 'N' class 2-6-0 mixed traffic locomotives in 1917.

However, more of the 'N' class locomotives were produced at the works, and parts for 'K' class locos that were assembled by Armstrong Whitworth of Newcastle upon Tyne. In 1942 the works also built twenty of the Bulleid 'Q1' class 0-6-0, the remainder being built at Brighton Works. During the later war years the works also built a number of the LMS 8F type 2-8-0 freight locomotives for the War Department. The last of the 639 steam locomotives built there was LMSR 2-8-0 No. 8674.

In 1937 it was involved with in the English Electric company in the construction of three experimental diesel-electric shunters and after the war, Ashford Works continued manufacturing a further series of 350 hp 0-6-0 diesel-electric shunters. Under British Railways Ashford Works built the first two of the Southern Region prototype 1Co-Co1 diesel electric locomotives of the D16/2 class numbered 10201 and 10202 in 1951. In 1962 all locomotive production and repairs were moved to Eastleigh.

=== Locomotive classes built at Ashford ===
Class	Wheel arrangement	Built	Total	Notes	Ref
South Eastern Railway: James Cudworth (160)
"Coffee Pot"	0-4-0T	1850	1	First loco completed at Ashford. Vertical boiler	
"Hastings" class	2-4-0	1853–54	10	First locos entirely built at Ashford.	
"Standard goods" (I)	0-6-0	1855–76	53		
"Little Mails"	2-2-2	1856–57	6		
"Little Sharps"	2-4-0	1858–59	6	some parts from old Sharp, Roberts engines	
Coupled Express or 118 class (E)	2-4-0	1859–75	68		
"Mail Singles" (B)	2-2-2	1861	2		
205 class (G)	0-4-2WT	1863–64	2		
"Mail Singles" (P)	2-2-2	1865–66	6		
73 class (H)	0-4-2WT	1867–69	6		
South Eastern Railway: Richard Mansell (15)
Folkestone Harbour tanks (K)	0-6-0T	1877	3		
"Gunboats" (M)	0-4-4T	1877-78	9		
59 class (N)	0-6-0	1879	3		
South Eastern Railway: James Stirling (239)
A class	4-4-0	1879-81	12		
Q class	0-4-4T	1881-95	48		
O class	0-6-0	1882-99	57	last 5 built by SE&CR	
F class	4-4-0	1883-98	88		
R class	0-6-0T	1888-98	25		
B class	4-4-0	1898-99	9	last 5 built by SE&CR	
South Eastern & Chatham Railway: Harry Wainwright (196)
C class	0-6-0	1900-08	70		
D class	4-4-0	1901-07	21		
H class	0-4-4T	1904-15	66	last 2 built during Maunsell's term	
E class	4-4-0	1906-09	26		
P class	0-6-0T	1909-10	8		
J class	0-6-4T	1913	5		
South Eastern & Chatham Railway, Southern Railway: Richard Maunsell (118 steam; 3 Diesel)
K class	2-6-4T	1917	1		
N class	2-6-0	1917-34	80	50 were commenced at Woolwich Arsenal and completed at Ashford	
N1 class	2-6-0	1923-30	6		
K1 class	2-6-4T	1925	1		
U class	2-6-0	1928–31	20		
W class	2-6-4T	1935-36	10		
SR nos. 1-3	0-6-0DE	1937	3	Diesel-electric. Power equipment manufactured and fitted by English Electric at Preston	
Southern Railway and British Railways: later designs (34 steam; 29 Diesel; 3 electric)
SR class CC	Co-Co	1941-48	3	Electric. Power equipment manufactured by English Electric	
SR class Q1	0-6-0	1942	20	Designed by Oliver Bulleid	
LMS class 8F	2-8-0	1943-44	14	Built to Railway Executive Committee order for use on London, Midland and Scottish Railway	
BR nos. 15211-36	0-6-0DE	1949-52	26	Diesel-electric. Power equipment manufactured by English Electric	
BR no. 11001	0-6-0DM	1950	1	Diesel-mechanical. Power equipment manufactured by Paxman	
BR nos. 10201-2	1Co-Co1	1950-51	2	Diesel-electric. Power equipment manufactured by English Electric	

The class letters were allotted to older classes by James Stirling in September 1879. Classes without such a letter were either extinct, or in the process of withdrawal at that date.

Altogether, Ashford built 711 complete steam locomotives and finished 51 which were commenced elsewhere. There were 32 diesel and three electric locomotives, all of which incorporated parts made by outside contractors.
