= SER Q class =

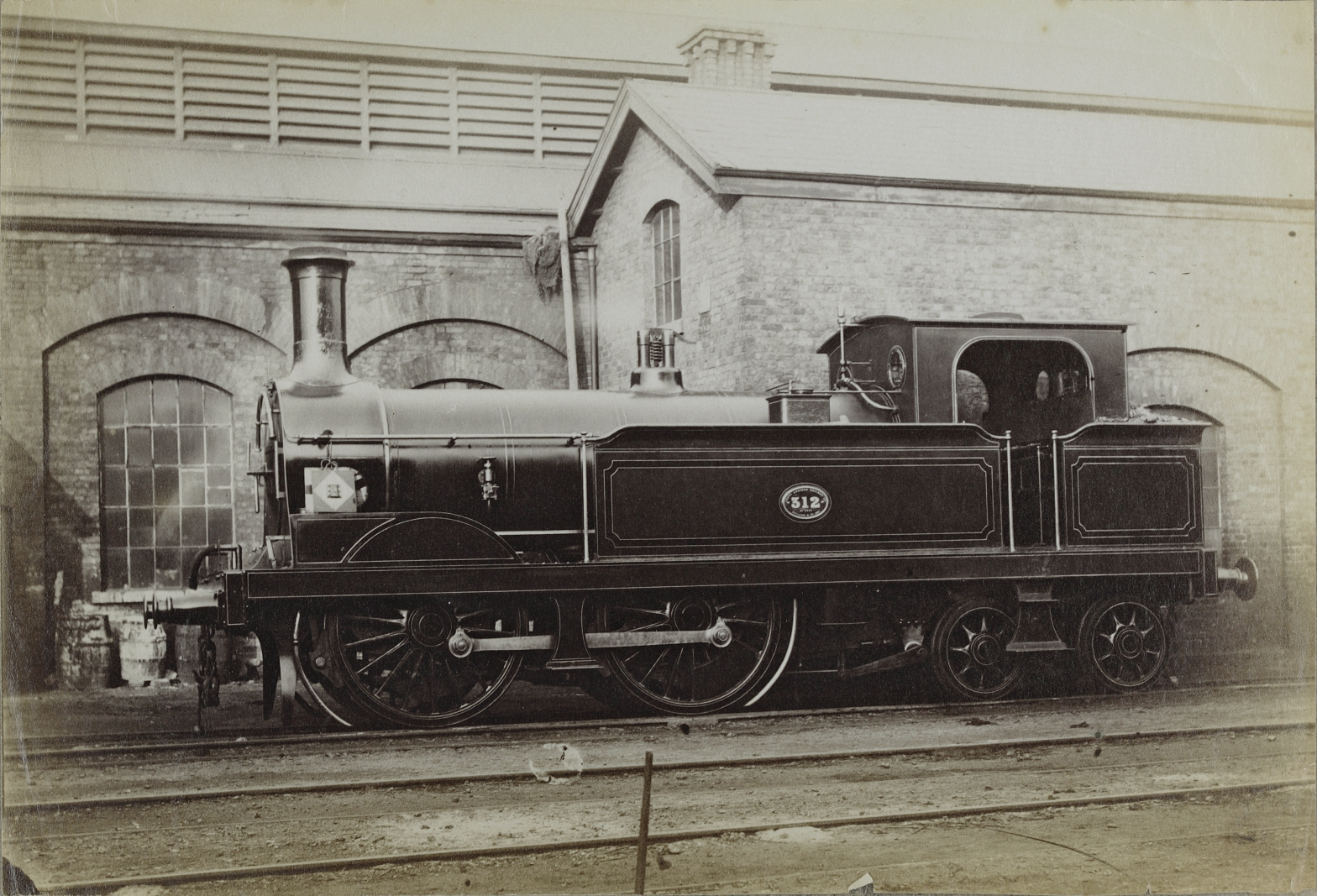
- South Eastern Railway Class Q, 312
Type and origin
- Power type: Steam
- Designer: James Stirling
- Build date: 1881–1897
- Total produced: 118
Specifications
- Configuration
  - Whyte: 0-4-4T
  - UIC: B2′ n2
- Gauge: 4 ft 8 1/2 in (1,435 mm)
- Driver dia.: 5 ft 6 in (1.676 m)
- Trailing dia.: 3 ft 0 in (0.914 m)
- Wheelbase: 22 ft (7 m)
- Axle load: 16 long tons (16.3 t)
- Loco weight: 48.65 long tons (49.4 t)
- Fuel type: Coal
- Fuel capacity: 0.15 long tons (0.2 t)
- Water cap.: 1,050 imp gal (4,800 L; 1,260 US gal)
- Firebox
  - Grate area: 16 sq ft (1 m^{2})
- Boiler pressure: 140 lbf/in^{2} (0.97 MPa)
- Heating surface
  - Tubes and flues: 922.5 sq ft (85.70 m^{2})
- Cylinders: Two, inside
- Cylinder size: 18 in × 26 in (457 mm × 660 mm)
- Valve gear: Stephenson
Performance figures
- Tractive effort: 15,189 lbf (67.56 kN)
Career
- Operators: South Eastern Railway; → South Eastern and Chatham Railway; → Southern Railway
- Class: Q
- Number in class: 1 January 1923: 32
- Withdrawn: 1907–1929
- Disposition: All scrapped

The SER Q class was a class of 0-4-4T steam locomotives of the South Eastern Railway. The class was designed by James Stirling and introduced in 1881.

== Construction ==
Prior to the appointment of James Stirling as Locomotive Superintendent of the South Eastern Railway (SER) in 1878, that railway possessed only a small number of tank locomotives suitable for the London suburban passenger services. There were twelve 0-4-2WT of the 205 class (later G class) dating from 1863–64; seven 0-4-4WT of the 235 class (later J class) dating from 1866; six 0-4-2WT of the 73 class (later H class) dating from 1867–69; and nine 0-4-4T of the 58 class (later M class) dating from 1877–78.

The SER had opened a connection to the London, Chatham and Dover Railway in June 1878 giving access to Blackfriars station, the Widened Lines and thus the Great Northern Railway. Tender locomotives were not suitable for working this route, and nor were many of the existing tank engines which were not powerful enough. As a stop-gap pending the preparation of a new design, the SER purchased three newly-built Metropolitan Railway B Class 4-4-0T locomotives from that railway in April 1880, which were used on SER services from Woolwich Arsenal via Blackfriars and Finsbury Park to Alexandra Palace. They were sold back to the Metropolitan Railway in November 1883.

In his previous post with the Glasgow and South Western Railway (G&SWR), Stirling had designed an 0-4-4T for suburban passenger services, the G&SWR 1 class. He kept copies of the drawings and used these as the basis for a new class for the SER, which became the SER Q class. One hundred and eighteen locomotives were built between 1881 and 1897, of which 60 were built by Neilson and Company; 48 by the SER at Ashford Works; and ten by Sharp, Stewart and Company.

Table of orders and numbers
Years	Builder	Quantity	SER Nos.
1881	Neilson	10	303–312
1881–82	Ashford	12	177, 178, 158, 161, 162, 164, 5, 181, 27, 182, 180, 184
1882–83	Neilson	10	319–328
1885	Ashford	2	329, 330
1887	Ashford	10	129, 193, 237, 239, 40, 26, 12, 72, 200, 235
1888	Ashford	5	16, 81, 83, 141, 173
1889	Ashford	4	23, 85, 220, 82
1889	Neilson	10	343–352
1891	Neilson	15	354–368
1891	Ashford	6	58, 134, 146, 73, 115, 224
1892	Ashford	3	135, 136, 138
1893–94	Sharp Stewart	10	399–408
1894–95	Ashford	6	6, 50, 95, 76, 168, 169
1897	Neilson	15	410–424

Most were built with tall chimneys giving an overall height of 13 ft 3 1/2 in (4.051 m) and two injectors for the boiler feed. The 1881–82 Ashford series were built for working through the Snow Hill tunnel and the tunnels of the East London Railway, and so were provided with condensers and short chimneys giving an overall height of 12 ft 6 in (3.81 m), one injector being omitted and a boiler feed pump fitted instead.

The first 34, built between 1881 and 1885, had bogies of wheelbase 4 ft 10 in (1.47 m) having wheels of 3 ft (0.91 m) diameter. These bogies had a fixed centre pin and were troublesome, and so beginning in 1887 new locomotives had a better bogie design based upon that of the contemporary 4-4-0s of the F class. This had 13/16 in (21 mm) side play, its wheelbase being 5 ft 4 in (1.63 m); and after four of these had been built using the 3-foot wheel, subsequent locomotives had the bogie wheel diameter increased to 3 ft 9 in (1.14 m) to make them fully interchangeable with those of the F class.

== Rebuilding ==
The locomotives passed to the South Eastern and Chatham Railway in 1899 and 55 were rebuilt by Harry Wainwright to class Q1 between 1903 and 1919.

== Numbering ==
Thirty-two unrebuilt locomotives survived into Southern Railway ownership on 1 January 1923 with random numbers between 6 and 424. All had been withdrawn by 1929.

Table of withdrawals
Year	Quantity in service at start of year	Quantity withdrawn	Locomotive numbers	Notes
1925	32	1	A346	
1926	31	15	A40, A72, A73, A82, A135, A220, A237, A345, A352, A358, A360, A405, A417, A418, A422	
1927	16	11	A6, A26, A136, A169, A235, A356, A399, A410, A414, A421, A424	
1928	5	3	A23, A173, A401	
1929	2	2	A349, A368	
