= SECR D class =

Class of British steam locomotives

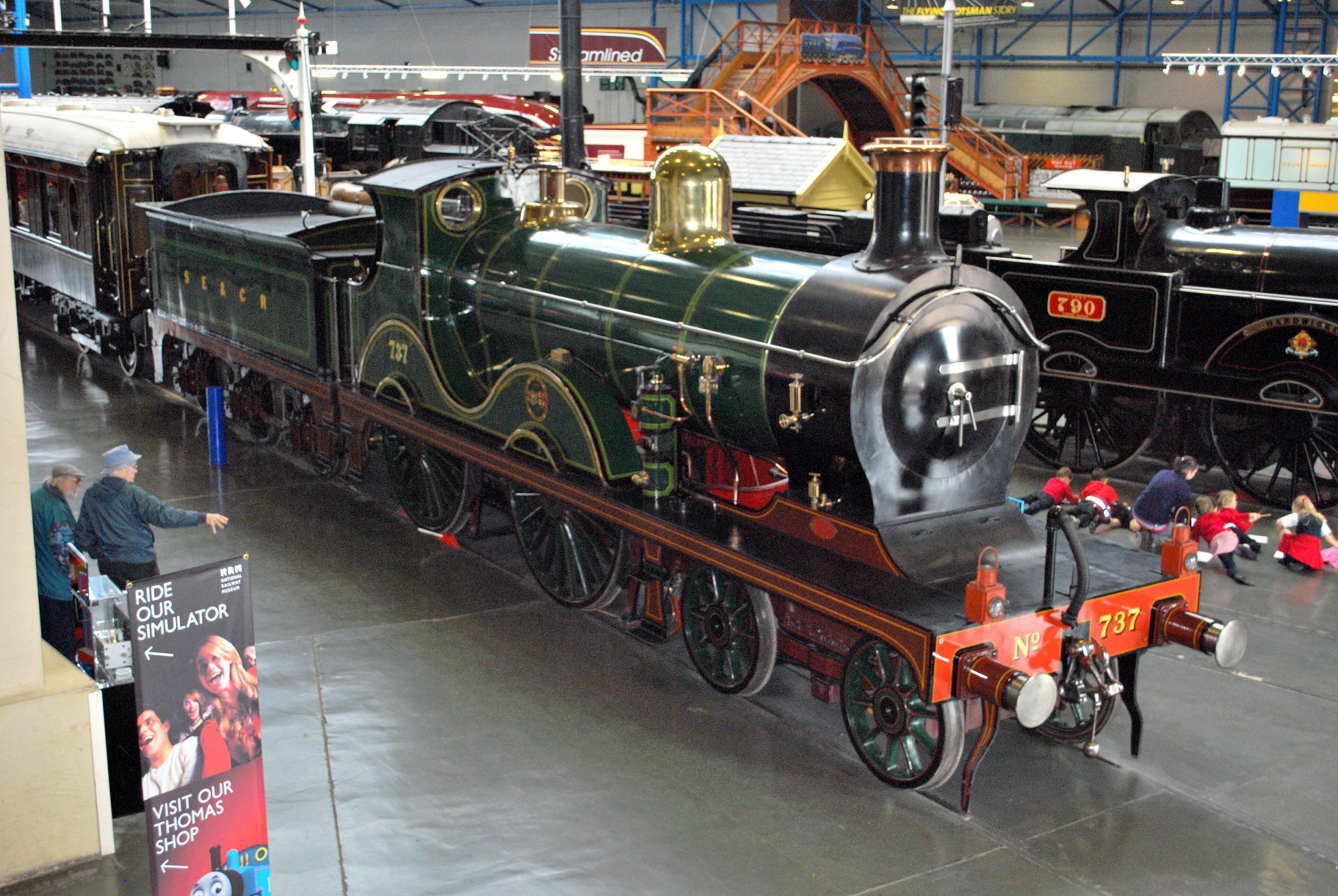
- The only preserved example seen in the great hall of the National Railway Museum
Type and origin
- Power type: Steam
- Designer: Harry Wainwright
- Builder: Ashford Works (21); Dübs & Co. (10); Sharp, Stewart & Co. (10); Robert Stephenson & Co. (5); Vulcan Foundry (5)
- Build date: 1901–1907
- Total produced: 51
Specifications
- Configuration
  - Whyte: 4-4-0
  - UIC: 2′B n2
- Gauge: 4 ft 8 1/2 in (1,435 mm)
- Leading dia.: 3 ft 7 in (1.092 m)
- Driver dia.: 6 ft 8 in (2.032 m)
- Loco weight: 50 long tons 0 cwt (112,000 lb or 50.8 t)
- Tender weight: 38 long tons 5 cwt (85,700 lb or 38.9 t)
- Fuel type: Coal
- Water cap.: 3,300 imp gal (15,000 L; 4,000 US gal)
- Firebox
  - Grate area: 20 1/4 sq ft (1.88 m^{2})
- Boiler pressure: 175 lbf/in^{2} (1.21 MPa)
- Heating surface
  - Firebox: 124 sq ft (11.5 m^{2})
  - Tubes: 1,381 sq ft (128.3 m^{2})
  - Total surface: 1,505 sq ft (139.8 m^{2})
- Cylinders: Two, inside
- Cylinder size: 19 in × 26 in (483 mm × 660 mm)
Performance figures
- Tractive effort: 17,450 lbf (77.62 kN)
Career
- Operators: South Eastern and Chatham Railway; → Southern Railway; → British Railways
- Class: D
- Power class: British Railways: D: 1P, later 2P; D1: 2P, later 3P
- Locale: Southern Region
- Withdrawn: D: 1944–1956; D1:1944–1961
- Disposition: 21 rebuilt to D1 class (1921–25) one preserved; remainder scrapped

The SECR D class is a class of 4-4-0 tender locomotives designed by Harry Wainwright for the South Eastern and Chatham Railway.

== Overview ==
The construction of the initial 20 engines was shared between Ashford railway works and the Glasgow builder, Sharp, Stewart and Company. The first of the class to enter service in 1901 was a Glasgow product, and by 1907 fifty-one were in traffic. Of these twenty-one were Ashford built while the rest were supplied by outside contractors. The D class was a Harry Wainwright design and he was responsible for the overall look of the engine. The detail work was undertaken by Robert Surtees, his chief draughtsman at Ashford works.

== D1 class ==
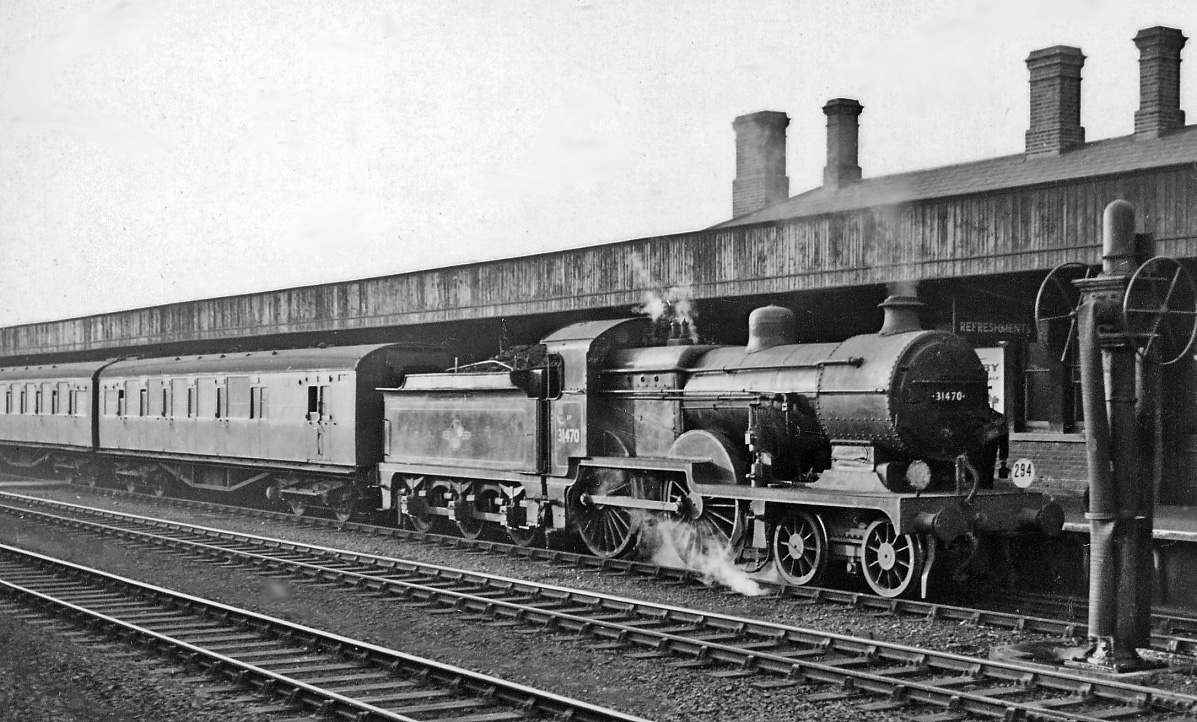
D1 31470 at Tonbridge 1958

In 1913, Richard Maunsell started the rebuilding of 21 D Class locomotives with Belpaire fireboxes to produce the more powerful D1 class. These bigger engines were needed to cope with increasing loads on the Kent Coast Line through Chatham.

== Operation ==
Initially the D class was put to work on the Kent coast and Hastings services out of London. By the 1930s the largest allocation of D class 4-4-0s was at Gillingham depot in Kent but they had by now been reduced to secondary train duties and were now carrying the livery of the Southern Railway. At the outbreak of World War II in 1939 some of the D class were placed into storage. Then in 1941 others were transferred to Nine Elms depot. A handful were based at Redhill on the Reading-Tonbridge cross-country line. Three were withdrawn before nationalisation: D no. 1742 and D1 no. 1747 were both withdrawn in October 1944 due to war damage; and D no. 1726 was withdrawn in November 1947 with damaged frames.

Dover Boat Train Grove Park Station

In 1948 British Railways (BR) inherited 28 of the D class 4-4-0s, and 20 of the D1 class. BR increased the numbers by 30000, except for four D class (nos. 1493, 1730/2/48), which were withdrawn before renumbering could occur. The BR power classification, introduced in January 1949, was initially 1P for class D and 2P for class D1, but these were revised to 2P and 3P respectively in October 1953. Their final years saw them concentrated at Guildford in Surrey and the last of the D class, No.31075, was withdrawn from there on 15 December 1956. The last of the D1s, meanwhile, were Nos. 31489, 31739, and 31749 from Bricklayers Arms on 11 November 1961.

Table of withdrawals
Year	Quantity in service at start of year	Quantity withdrawn	Locomotive numbers	Notes
1944	51	2	1742/47	1742 D class, 1747 D1 class
1947	49	1	1726	D class
1950	48	2	31736/38	31738 D class; 31736 D1 class
1951	46	11	31057/92, 31477/90, 31502, (3)1730, 31731, (3)1732, 31740/45, (3)1748	31502 and 31745 D1 class, remainder D class
1953	35	5	31501, 31728/33/44/50	All D class
1954	30	3	(3)1493, 31729/46	All D class
1955	27	4	31496, 31586/91, 31734	All D class
1956	23	6	31075, 31488, 31549/74/77, 31737	All D class
1959	17	2	31470, 31741	Both D1 class
1960	15	5	31492/94, 51509, 31743/49	All D1 class
1961	10	10	31145, 31246/47, 31487/89, 31505/45, 31727/35/39	All D1 class

== Preservation ==
One engine, No.31737, has been preserved and is in its original livery – that of the South Eastern & Chatham Railway – at the National Railway Museum in York.

== Models ==
Dapol, in association with Rails of Sheffield and Locomotion, released a model of the D Class in OO scale in 2021. On February 22, 2022, Dapol and Rails of Sheffield announced a further model of the D1 Class, which was released in June 2023.
