= Harry Wainwright =

British railway engineer (1864–1925)

Harry Smith Wainwright
- Born: 16 November 1864; Worcester, England
- Died: 19 September 1925 (aged 60)
- Parent: William Wainwright
- Engineering career
- Discipline: Locomotive engineer
- Employer(s): South Eastern Railway; South Eastern and Chatham Railway

Harry Smith Wainwright (16 November 1864 – 19 September 1925) was an English railway engineer, and was the Locomotive, Carriage and Wagon Superintendent of the South Eastern and Chatham Railway from 1899 to 1913. He is best known for a series of simple but competent locomotives produced under his direction at the company's Ashford railway works in the early years of the twentieth century. Many of these survived in service until the end of steam traction in Britain in 1968, and are regarded as some of the most elegant designs of the period.

== Biography ==
Wainwright was born at Worcester on 16 November 1864, the third son of William Wainwright.

In 1896, he was appointed Carriage & Wagon Superintendent of the South Eastern Railway (SER), in succession to his father.

On 1 January 1899, the SER entered into a working union with the London, Chatham and Dover Railway (LCDR); their respective Locomotive Superintendents, James Stirling and William Kirtley, both retired, and the newly formed South Eastern and Chatham Railway (SECR) decided to combine the locomotive, carriage and wagon departments of the two railways, and appoint Wainwright as the Locomotive, Carriage and Wagon Superintendent. Robert Surtees, the former LCDR Chief Draughtsman, became Chief Draughtsman of the SECR.

Wainwright retired on 30 November 1913.

Wainwright died on 19 September 1925.

== Locomotives ==
The first locomotives to be placed in service by the SECR under Wainwright's supervision were not of his design. Until new standard designs could be prepared, which would be acceptable on both the SER and LCDR sections of the SECR, it was necessary to fulfil immediate locomotive requirements in other ways. Existing locomotive orders were allowed to stand; further orders were placed for existing designs (in some cases design modifications were made); and locomotives built to the designs of an entirely different company were purchased from a manufacturer's unsold stock.

Five 4-4-0 express passenger engines of Kirtley's M3 class, which had been introduced on the LCDR in 1891, were built at Longhedge between May 1899 and May 1901. Two of these were the balance of an outstanding LCDR order; the remainder formed part of an order for ten placed by the SECR, of which seven were later cancelled.

Five 4-4-0 express passenger engines of Stirling's B class, which had been introduced on the SER in 1898, were built at Ashford in June and July 1899.

Five 0-6-0 goods engines of Stirling's O class, which had been introduced on the SER in 1878, were built at Ashford in August and September 1899.

The locomotive manufacturer Neilson, Reid and Company had built ten 4-4-0 express passenger engines in late 1899 to the design of William Pickersgill for the Great North of Scotland Railway (GNoSR) where they formed Class V. After the GNoSR decided that only five were required, Neilson's were left with the remainder on their hands, and were asked by the GNoSR to sell them for the best possible price. They were offered to the SECR, which agreed to take the five engines which the GNoSR did not need, subject to certain modifications being made. They were delivered to the SECR in January and February 1900, where they formed the G class.

Fifteen 0-4-4T suburban passenger engines, the R1 class (based on Kirtley's R class of 1891) were built by Sharp, Stewart & Co in November and December 1900.

The first designs which credited Wainwright as designer began to appear in 1900. In almost all cases, the actual design work was supervised by Surtees, with Wainwright specifying broad requirements and also deciding the finish and livery.

The C class of 0-6-0 goods engines comprised 109 locomotives built between 1900 and 1908, of which 15 each were built by the contractors Neilson, Reid and Sharp, Stewart; the remainder were built by the SECR, 60 at Ashford and 9 at Longhedge.

The D class of 4-4-0 express passenger engines comprised 51 locomotives built between 1901 and 1907, of which 30 were built by four different contractors, and 21 were built by the SECR at Ashford.

The H class of 0-4-4T suburban passenger engines comprised 64 locomotives built at Ashford between 1904 and 1909, with a final two completed in 1915 after Wainwright's retirement.

Eight steam railcars were bought from Kitson & Co. in 1905-6 for use on local passenger services.

The E class of 4-4-0 express passenger engines comprised 26 locomotives built at Ashford between 1905 and 1909.

The P class of 0-6-0T local passenger engines comprised eight locomotives built at Ashford in 1909-10.

The J class of 0-6-4T passenger engines comprised five locomotives built at Ashford in 1913.

The L class of 4-4-0 express passenger engines comprised 22 locomotives built by contractors in 1914. Although the specification was drawn up by Wainwright, and the design work supervised by Surtees, the order was not placed until after Wainwright's retirement; his successor, Richard Maunsell, specified some design changes. 12 came from Beyer, Peacock & Co., whilst the other ten were built in Berlin by A. Borsig; these were delivered before the outbreak of war on 3 August 1914, but were not paid for until May 1920.

== Patents ==
- GB190322276, published 28 April 1904, Improved draught producing and spark arresting apparatus for locomotive engines
- GB190718258 (with Walter Reuben Preston), published 6 August 1908, Improvements in means for securing doors or flaps of railway trucks, horse boxes or the like

== Notes ==
Business positions
| Preceded by William Wainwright | Carriage and Wagon Superintendent of South Eastern Railway; 1896–1898 | Post abolished Company merged into South Eastern and Chatham Railway |
| First | Locomotive, Carriage and Wagon Superintendent of South Eastern and Chatham Railway; 1899–1913 | Succeeded by Richard Maunsell |
