= Cranbrook and Tenterden Light Railway =

19th Century abandoned railway project in Britain

The Cranbrook and Tenterden Light Railway was a railway line which was to have linked the Hawkhurst Branch Line with the Rother Valley Railway in Kent. Although it received authorisation for its construction, only a short section of it was ever built. This section is open today as part of the Kent and East Sussex Railway.

== History ==
With the opening of the South Eastern Main Line between Tonbridge and Ashford in 1842; the railway between Ashford and Hastings in 1851, and the railway between Tonbridge and Hastings in stages between 1845 and 1853, a large tract of the High Weald in Kent and East Sussex was left devoid of railways. In 1892, the Hawkhurst Branch Line was opened to Goudhurst. It was extended to Hawkhurst the following year. The South Eastern Railway (SER) planned a line to link Cranbrook, Tenterden and Ashford. These plans were abandoned by the SER but were taken up by the Rother Valley Railway (RVR) in November 1898 and promoted as the Cranbrook, Tenterden and Ashford Light Railway. The SER opposed the section of line from Tenterden to Ashford and this was dropped by the RVR. Construction of the Cranbrook and Tenterden Light Railway was authorised by the Cranbrook and Tenterden Light Railway Order 1899 in December 1899.

In 1900, the RVR opened as far as a station at Rolvenden, which was then known as Tenterden. The only part of the Cranbrook and Tenterden Light Railway ever built was the section between the original Tenterden station and Tenterden Town. This opened to traffic on 15 April 1903. On 4 January 1954, this section of line closed to passengers along with the rest of the K&ESR. It remained open for freight until 12 June 1961 when the remaining section of the K&ESR closed, apart from a short section at Robertsbridge. On 3 February 1974, the section of line between Tenterden Town and Rolvenden reopened as part of the preserved K&ESR.

== Route ==
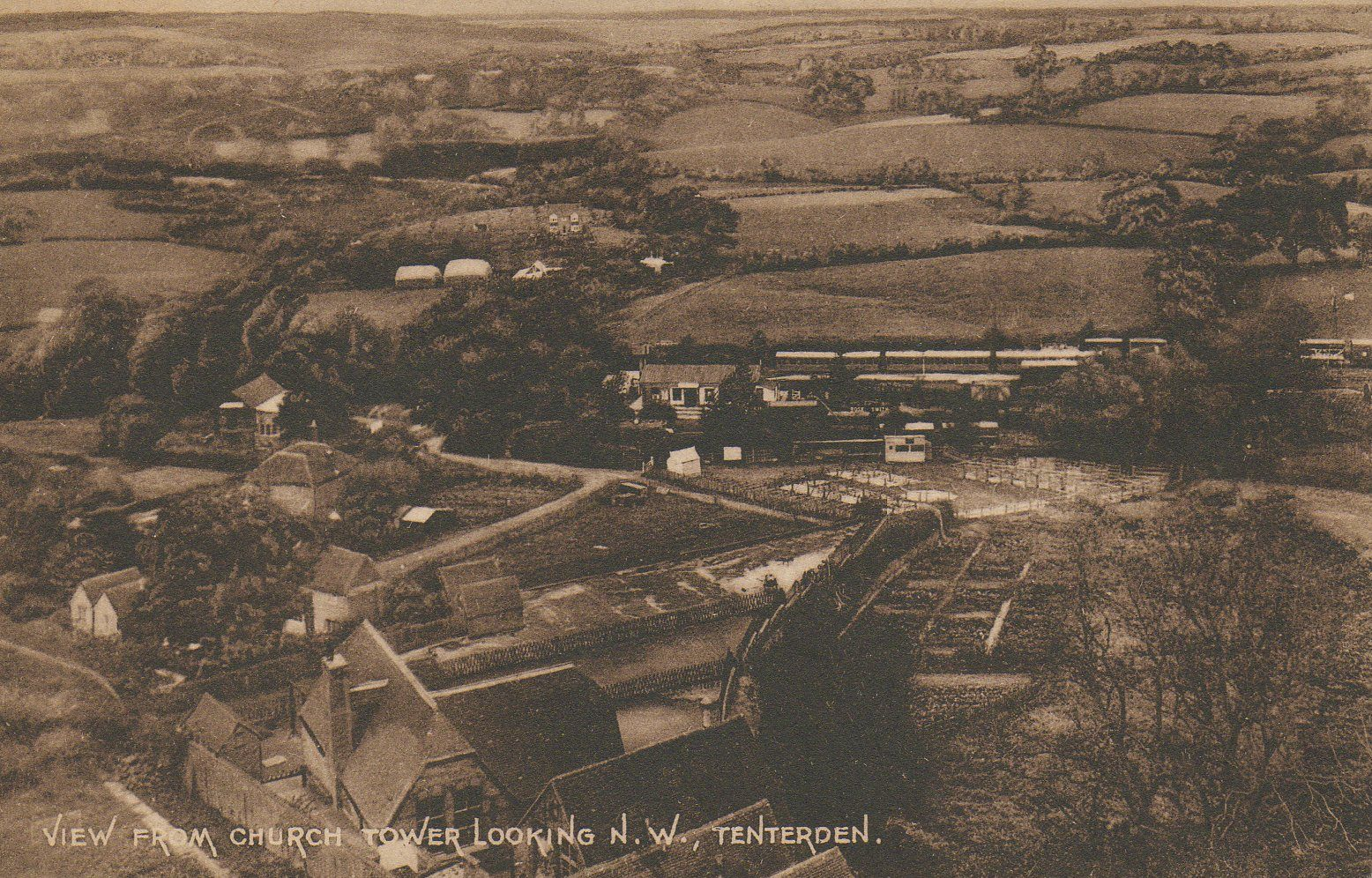
Tenterden Town station c1900, the only station on the Cranbrook and Tenterden Light Railway to be built

The line to Hawkhurst had bypassed the town of Cranbrook, with Cranbrook station being located in Hartley, almost 2 miles (3.2 km) from the town. The Cranbrook and Tenterden Light Railway would have commenced from a junction just to the north of Cranbrook station, heading in a generally north easterly direction to Cranbrook Town station, and then turning south easterly to serve Sissinghurst Road station and Benenden station, after which the line turned east to serve Rolvenden station and joining the Rother Valley Railway via a triangular junction between Tenterden and Tenterden Town stations. The line from the junction with the RVR to Tenterden Town station included a climb at 1 in 50. Although only this 1 1/2 miles (2.4 km) long section was built, the line was shown on maps included in the Kent & East Sussex Light Railway's Annual Reports until 1934.
