= Hawkhurst branch line =

Railway in Kent, England

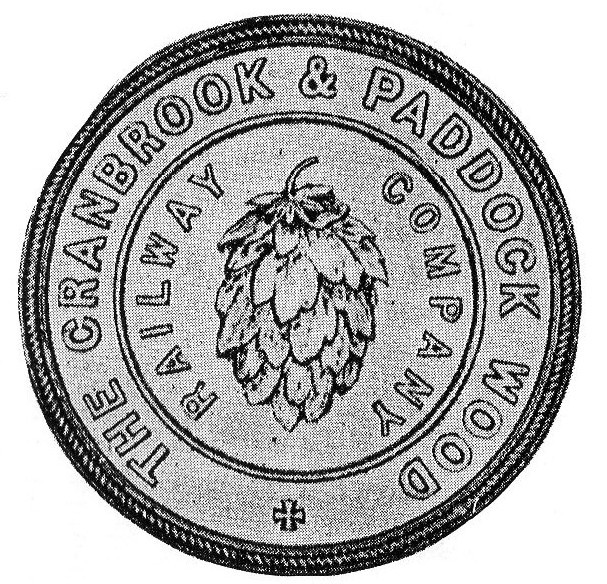

Overview
- Locale: Kent, England
- Dates of operation: 1892–1961
- Successor: Abandoned

Technical
- Track gauge: 4 ft 8 1/2 in (1,435 mm)
- Length: 11 miles 24 chains (11.30 mi; 18.19 km)

The Hawkhurst branch in relation to other railway lines in Kent

The Hawkhurst branch line was a short railway line in Kent that connected Hawkhurst, Cranbrook, Goudhurst and Horsmonden with the town of Paddock Wood and the South Eastern and Medway Valley lines, a distance of 11 miles 24 chains (11.30 mi; 18.19 km).

The line was promoted by the Cranbrook and Paddock Wood Railway (C&PWR), which was incorporated in August 1877, but took until 1892 to open the first section of the line to Hope Mill. Services were worked by the South Eastern and Chatham Railway (SECR). The line was extended to Hawkhurst in 1893. In 1900, the SECR absorbed the C&PWR. Sunday services ceased in 1917. In 1923, the SECR was absorbed into the Southern Railway at the Grouping. The line became part of British Railways at nationalisation on 1 January 1948. The line was closed in June 1961, before the Beeching Report was published.

== Origins ==
=== Background ===
The construction between 1842 and 1853 of the Ashford to Hastings Line, the Tonbridge to Hastings line and South Eastern Main Line between Redhill and Folkestone left a triangle of land within the Kentish High Weald with no rail services. It was a heavily wooded and agricultural area with many small villages and hamlets; the three largest being Cranbrook, the former heart of the defunct Wealden cloth industry, Hawkhurst and Tenterden. There were no large landowners or wealthy industrialists to promote a branch line, while the local railway company – the South Eastern Railway (SER) – preferred to wait for local enterprise funding.

Cranbrook and Paddock Wood Railway Act 1877
- Act of Parliament
- Parliament of the United Kingdom
- Long title: An Act for making a Railway from Cranbrook to Paddock Wood, in the County of Kent.
- Citation: 40 & 41 Vict. c. clx

Dates
- Royal assent: 2 August 1877

Text of statute as originally enacted

A variety of abortive schemes were proposed, including one in 1864 by the nominally independent Weald of Kent Railway from Paddock Wood to Hythe via Cranbrook for which the SER obtained authorisation in the South Eastern Railway (Extensions to Cranbrook, Hythe, &c.) Act 1864 (27 & 28 Vict. c. xcix) as defence against a similar scheme by the rival London, Chatham and Dover Railway (LCDR). The SER's enthusiasm for the scheme waned after the LCDR's financial collapse in 1866 following the Overend Gurney crisis. Another independent company, the locally promoted Cranbrook and Paddock Wood Railway, revived the scheme in 1877 promoted it until its opening in October 1892. The company was incorporated by the Cranbrook and Paddock Wood Railway Act 1877 (40 & 41 Vict. c. clx) on 2 August 1877.

=== Construction ===
Cranbrook and Paddock Wood Railway Act 1882
- Act of Parliament
- Parliament of the United Kingdom
- Long title: An Act to authorise the Cranbrook and Paddock Wood Railway Company to extend their Railway to Hawkhurst in the county of Kent; to raise further Money; and for other purposes.
- Citation: 45 & 46 Vict. c. cxxxii

Dates
- Royal assent: 12 July 1882

Text of statute as originally enacted

The Cranbrook and Paddock Wood Railway obtained authorisation for a single track line to link the two towns from which the company took its name. Agreement had been reached with the SER that it would provide £50,000 (Note: £5.04 million in 2025.) towards construction costs once the local company had raised £25,000 (Note: £2.52 million in 2025.) in the district. The necessary funds could not be raised and by April 1878 only £11,000 (Note: £1,130,000 in 2025.) had been found and, on the suggestion of the SER, it was decided to save costs by locating Cranbrook station in Hartley, 2 miles (3.2 km) from Cranbrook's centre, where land prices were higher. Preliminary construction works were commenced in 1879 but soon ground to a halt due to a lack of funds. Undissuaded, the railway company obtained two further acts of Parliament, the Cranbrook and Paddock Wood Railway Act 1882 (45 & 46 Vict. c. cxxxii) and the South Eastern Railway Act 1892 (55 & 56 Vict. c. c), which authorised a "cut-price" route between Goudhurst and Hawkhurst.

Financial problems meant that construction was further delayed between 1884 and 1890, by which time the SER had taken over the board of the Cranbrook Railway on which now sat Alfred Gathorne-Hardy, Lord Brabourne and Alfred Watkin, son of SER chairman Edward Watkin. Edward Seaton, an engineer and independent consultant to the Metropolitan Railway, was appointed to oversee the works and he recommended the 22-year-old Holman Fred Stephens as resident engineer. The contract for the construction was awarded to J. T. Firbank who had overseen the building of the Metropolitan's line between Aylesbury and Quainton Road. Work began in the spring of 1890, and the first section between Paddock Wood and Hope Mill was opened on 1 October 1892. The remainder of the line to Hawkhurst followed a year later. The four stations were built by Mancktelow Bros, Horsmonden.

=== Route of the line ===
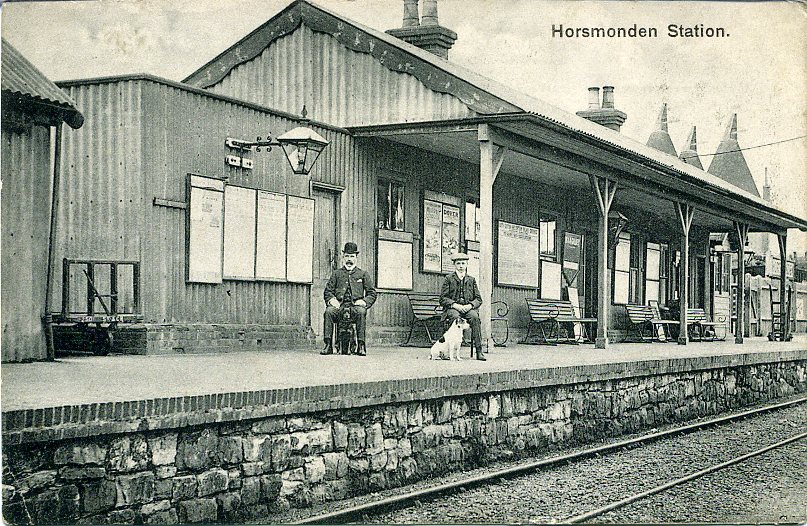
Horsmonden station, 1913, with oasts in the background.

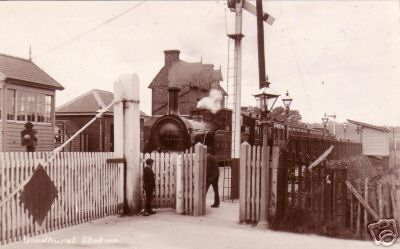
Goudhurst station, 1930s. Signal box at left and level crossing gates bottom left.

At Paddock Wood, the line's northern terminus, the rear of the Up platform was adapted to accommodate Hawkhurst services and 3/4 mile (1.21 km) of single track was laid parallel to the main line up to the point where the routes diverged. This arrangement kept branch services off the main line and avoided the cost of installing a signal box to control the junction. The branch gradually turned to the south and ran on the level, passing under a road bridge and over two level crossings, while climbing gradients of 1 in 78 and 1 in 66 through orchards and hop gardens, before reaching Churn Lane siding. The line then passed an accommodation crossing and under a road bridge carrying Yew Tree Green Road, climbing to 1 in 66 before running on a level for half a mile through Swigs Hole valley on a 42-foot-high (13 m) embankment. After crossing a deeply wooded cutting, the line reached the 86-yard (79 m) Horsmonden Tunnel which was situated on the summit level at the end of a 1-mile (1.6 km) climb at 1 in 66 and carried the B2162 road over the line.

Horsmonden was the first station to be reached. It was 4 miles 20 chains (4.25 mi; 6.84 km) from Paddock Wood). The station had a single platform on the up side. Goods facilities consisted a loop on the down side, and two sidings on the up side. The signal on the approach from Goudhurst had arms for traffic from both directions. Leaving Horsmonden, the branch crossed Goudhurst Road by a plate girder bridge, running along the valley of the River Teise towards the Wealden hills. After climbing much of the way through gradients of 1 in 85 and 1 in 60, Goudhurst was reached (6 miles 25 chains (6.31 mi; 10.16 km)), although it was a mile (1.6 km) away and some 250 feet (76 m) lower than Goudhurst village. It was initially more correctly named "Hope Mill, for Goudhurst and Lamberhurst". Goudhurst station had a passing loop and two platforms, and was signalled so that either platform could be used by down passenger trains. There were three sidings on the up side. The route then continued along the valley of a tributary of the Teise in a south-easterly direction. An intermediate siding at Pattenden served the local farming community and timber industry. Cranbrook (9 miles 70 chains (9.88 mi; 15.89 km)) was the line's third station and reached following a climb up the valley through woodland. There was a single platform on the down side, with a passing loop opposite it. Four sidings were on the down side of the line, but on the Goudhurst side of the station. Heading towards its southern terminus at Hawkhurst (11 miles 24 chains (11.30 mi; 18.19 km)), the branch climbed again at 1 in 85 up to the 178-yard (163 m) Badger's Oak Tunnel, the line's summit, before dropping at 1 in 80. To save costs, the station was situated at Gills Green, around 1 1/4 miles (2.01 km) from Hawkhurst village. Hawkhurst station was 46 1/4 miles (74.43 km) from Charing Cross. The single platform was on the down side of the line, with a passing loop opposite, which also gave access to the two road engine shed. The five sidings were located on the down side of the station.

=== Proposed extensions ===
Various abortive proposals were made to extend the line, whose dead-end nature deprived it of much of its usefulness. Even before construction had been completed, businesses in Tenterden were pressing the SER to link with their town. In response, the SER asked Edward Seaton to come forward with proposals for an affordable extension. Three schemes were put forward in October 1893 which would see the line extended from either Cranbrook or Hawkhurst. The first was essentially a continuation to Appledore, passing near the villages of Benenden, Newenden, Sandhurst and Rolvenden, but only passing within 1.5 miles (2.41 km) of Tenterden. The second would see the Hawkhurst branch becoming part of the proposed Loose Valley Railway linking Maidstone with Dungeness via Headcorn, Tenterden and Appledore. The final proposal began with a junction at Cranbrook station, before running to Appledore via Sissinghurst, Biddenden, Tenterden and Reading Street. None of these schemes came to fruition due to a lack of impetus on the part of the SER and the merger of operations of the SER with the rival London, Chatham and Dover Railway. The buffer stops at Hawkhurst were nevertheless positioned so as to allow the extension of the line without the need for alterations to the existing layout.

Holman Fred Stephens, the Hawkhurst line's resident engineer, later became the chief engineer in the construction of the Rother Valley Railway (RVR), later known as the Kent and East Sussex Railway) which opened in 1900 from Robertsbridge as far as Rolvenden (then known as "Tenterden"). In 1899, Stephens obtained a light railway order authorising the Cranbrook and Tenterden Light Railway, which would run from Cranbrook station through a 40-foot (12 m) tunnel under Hartley Road for a distance of 9 1/2 miles (15.29 km) to join the RVR at a triangular junction just beyond Rolvenden where it would join the proposed extension of the RVR to Headcorn. Due to the increase in the use of motor transport, apart from the section between Rolvenden and Tenterden Town, the line was never built although it continued to appear in Kent and East Sussex Railway reports until 1937.

== Operations ==
=== Official opening ===
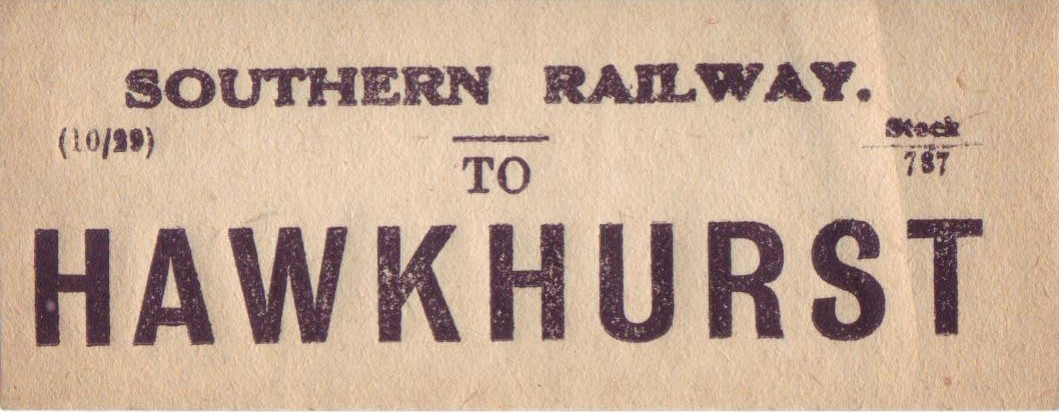
Luggage label issued by the Southern Railway

Following a satisfactory inspection carried out by Major Marindin of the Board of Trade on 3 September 1892, the line between Paddock Wood and Hope Mill, for Goudhurst and Lamberhurst was opened to passenger and goods traffic nine days later. The first service drawn by Cudworth E1 class 2-4-0 No. 112 left Hope Mill at 08:25 and free travel was offered throughout the day. The official opening took place on 1 October 1892, and services were extended to Hawkhurst on 4 September 1893. The line was worked by the SER (soon to become the SECR) which formally absorbed the Cranbrook and Paddock Wood Railway on 29 January 1900.

Shortly before the entire line was opened the residents of Cranbrook, regretful that the village was not directly served, approached the SER with a proposal to construct a 2-mile (3.22 km) "light line" between Hartley and Cranbrook at an estimated cost of £10,000, (Note: £1,110,000 in 2025.) which they offered to guarantee themselves. The scheme never came to fruition.

=== Traffic ===
==== Passengers ====
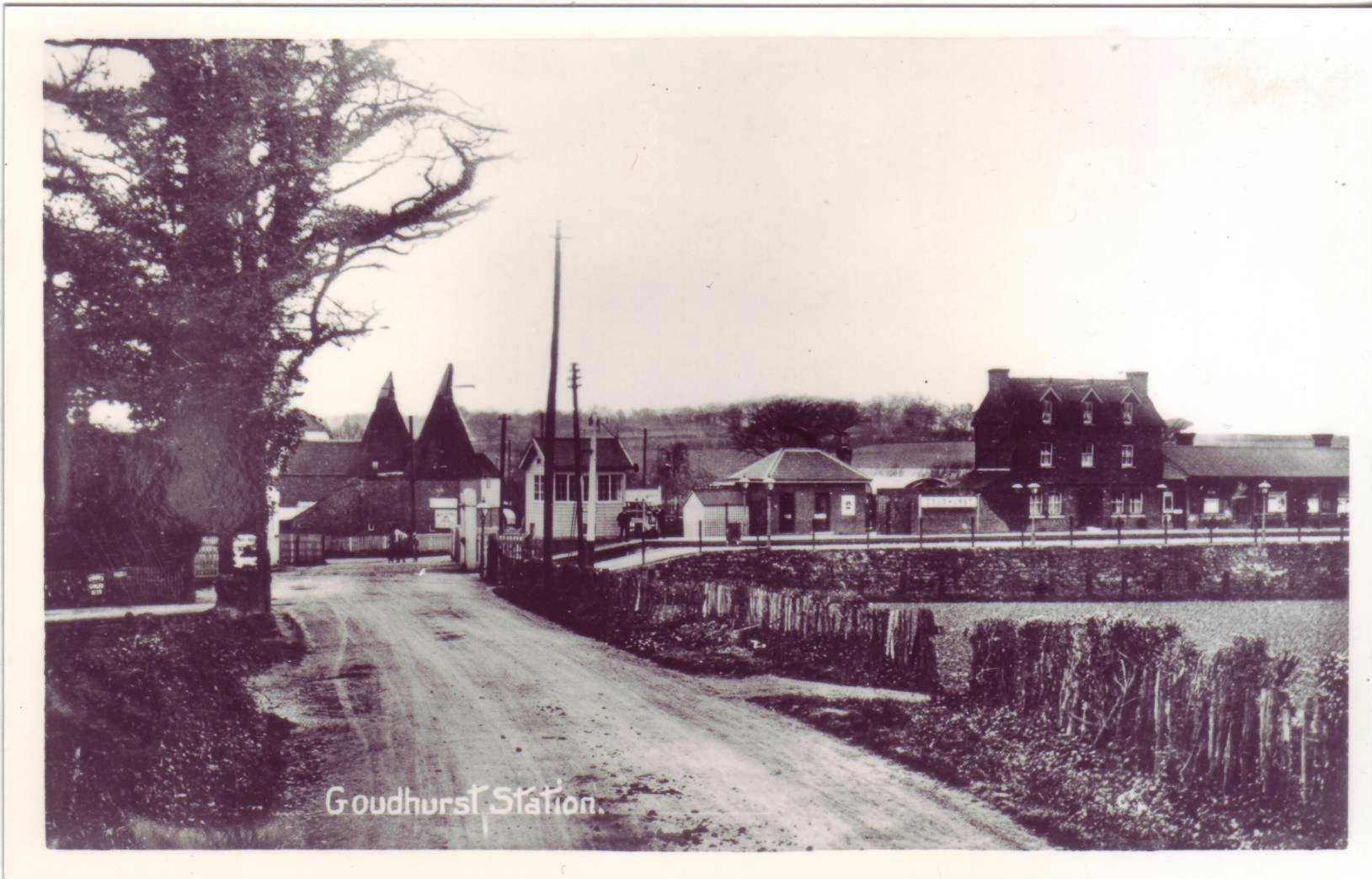
Goudhurst station from Station Road in the early 1900s

Passenger traffic was always light on the branch, and the addition of through coaches to London in the 1890s failed to encourage patronage. The inaugural passenger service of ten trains daily each way (two on Sundays) remained unchanged until 1917 when, as a result of economies imposed by the First World War, the frequency was reduced to four weekday services with no service on Sundays. Initially, passenger trains were worked by Cudworth 118 class 2-4-0 locomotives. Later, Cudworth E class 2-4-0s were used, with the occasional use of Stirling B Class and F class 4-4-0s. Since at least 1912, services had been drawn by an ageing Stirling Q class 0-4-4T locomotive. After the First World War, Kirtley R and R1 class 0-4-4Ts were introduced. These provided the mainstay of services until they were withdrawn in the 1950s and replaced by Wainwright H class 0-4-4s. In 1922, the timetable showed six down trains and seven up trains daily except Sundays. The maximum speed allowed on the line was 30 miles per hour (48 km/h), with a restriction of 10 miles per hour (16 km/h) at Smugley Farm occupation crossing, which was between Pattenden Siding and Cranbrook station.

1921 timetable Week Days Only.
Tonbridge Jn (dep)	8:17	10:55	1:30	4:03	5:45	7:10	Hawkhurst (dep)	7:49	9:05	11:44	3:39	4:57	6:01	6:44
Paddock Wood (arr)	8:26	11:03	1:39	4:12	5:54	7:17	Cranbrook	7:54	9:10	11:40	3:44	5:02	6:08	6:49
Paddock Wood (dep)	8:30	11:08	1:50	4:30	6:12	7:46	Goudhurst	8:01	9:17	11:58	3:51	5:09	6:13	6:56
Horsmonden	8:39	11:17	1:59	4:39	6:07	7:41	Horsmonden	8:06	9:22	12:04	3:56	5:14	6:30	7:11
Goudhurst	8:43	11:21	2:03	4:40	6:12	7:46	Paddock Wood (arr)	8:14	9:32	12:14	4:06	5:24	6:30	7:11
Cranbrook	8:52	11:30	2:12	4:52	6:20	7:51	Paddock Wood (dep)	8:21	9:43	12:16	4:31	5:30	6:33	7:22
Hawkhurst (arr)	8:57	11:35	2:17	4:57	6:30	8:00	Tonbridge Jn (arr)	8:40	9:53	12:25	4:40	5:39	6:42	7:31

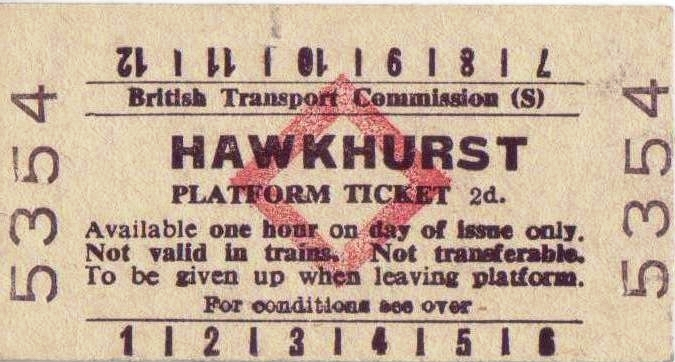
A platform ticket issued at Hawkhurst on 7 June 1961, five days before the closure of the line

By 1925, the frequency had increased to eight with the introduction of push-pull working by former LCDR R1 class 0-4-4T locomotives. In 1926, a Sentinel-Cammell steam railbus was trialled on the line for a month. Two extra services had been added by 1928 and an extra Saturday afternoon Paddock Wood working was added in 1930. By 1938 the timetable had taken on its final form of seven up and six down services plus the Saturday afternoon working; by special regulation, the push-pull services were guardless except for the first train of the day.

On 6 July 1950, the Queen Mother travelled the line as far as Cranbrook when she visited the National Sanatorium at Benenden. The five-coach Royal Train was pulled by a Maunsell E1 class 4-4-0 No. 31067, Her Majesty using a Pullman car named Malaga, which was flanked by two corridor composites; there was a corridor third brake at each end of the train. Malaga was one of six twelve-wheel first-class kitchen cars which had been built in 1920–1; and following an extensive refit in late 1949, was occasionally used in the Royal Train. It was withdrawn in 1961, and is preserved close to Shepperton railway station.

==== Goods ====
Goods traffic was more substantial, with fruit, hops and timber being sent out and coal being received. The 1937 timetable showed two down freight workings from Paddock Wood and one conditional working for Goudhurst, while in the other direction two conditional workings ran from Hawkhurst and one from Goudhurst. These were market trains and carried wagons for Blackfriars Goods attached to freight services at Paddock Wood. The volume of goods carried fell into steep decline after the Second World War as more and more freight was taken to market by road. Coal traffic remained constant as did the transport of pot plants from local nurseries at Flimwell and Wadhurst for F W Woolworth. This was an important source of revenue for the line with one million pot plants a year being transported from Hawkhurst, bringing in around £1,000 per week. (Note: £20,000 in 2025.) Up to four parcels and miscellaneous vans were loaded daily at Hawkhurst and attached to the last train to Tonbridge, with further collections possibly being made at Horsmonden; special services were laid on in the busy period before Mothering Sunday.

There were two sidings on the line which were available for public use. Churn Siding was located between Paddock Wood and Horsmonden stations. The siding was on the up side of the line. It was accessed by a facing connection in each direction. A siding at the Horsmonden end served a brickworks. Although some sources state that Churn Siding was out of use by 1940, photographs show that it was still in use in 1951 and it was named in the closure notice. Towards the end of the line's existence, Churn Siding was used for storage of wagons. The siding was located at the start of the 1 in 78 climb to Horsmonden. If wagons had to be left on the running line while shunting took place, they had to be left on the Paddock Wood side of the level crossing, where there was level track. Pattenden Siding was located between Goudhurst and Cranbrook stations, just after milepost 42 and thus 7 miles 20 chains (7.25 mi; 11.67 km) from Paddock Wood. The siding was located on the down side of the line. was accessed by a trailing connection in the down direction (towards Hawkhurst). Its main use was to import shoddy which was used as fertiliser for hop gardens.

==== Specials ====
During the early 1950s, well over 4,000 hop-pickers and some 23,000 visitors travelled in 56 "Hopper specials" – extra services laid on during the late August – early October hop season; at the busiest period, up to six trains per day ran through to the branch from London. In 1912 there had been 26 specials each carrying as many as 350 people; they generally started at London Bridge and called at New Cross or New Cross Gate. The farmers agreed between themselves when the picking would begin, and informed the railway who then set about the planning of the special trains. A "Hop Control Centre" was set up at Paddock Wood to organise these services, ensuring that hoppers could alight at London Bridge and be taken directly to the nearest hop farm. Since the hopping season generally coincided with the end of the holiday season, most serviceable trains were already in use elsewhere, so spare rolling stock would be brought out of storage and pressed into service for just three weeks; sometimes carriages had to be borrowed from other parts of the country. The carriages tended to be old or in poor condition, since the hoppers had a reputation for drunkenness and violence. This traffic was however already in decline as rising living standards and paid holidays led to a decline in the hop-picker workforce, and many of those who remained chose to travel by car or van. By 1959 the Sunday service consisted of a single two-coach unit, with an evening working to London Bridge. As mechanical pickers gradually replaced the human workforce, hop-picking had become a memory by the time the branch closed in 1961.

Special services were also laid on for the Benenden and Cranbrook boarding schools. Special trains to Benenden were laid on from Charing Cross, quite often with six corridor coaches hauled by E1 or D1 class 4-4-0 locomotives. The last special train ran on 2 May 1961 from Charing Cross at 2:46pm, hauled by D1 class 31749. Boarders' trunks and other belongings occupied so much space that utility vans were required at the end of each term. These were loaded at Hawkhurst and Cranbrook, attached to the daily up goods working and forwarded to Paddock Wood by parcels train. The behaviour of pupils from both schools was described by one regular passenger as "hysterical", with the girls from Benenden being compared to those of the fictional St Trinian's.

==== Accidents ====
On 18 February 1948 C Class locomotive 1225 was wrongly despatched into the north sidings at Goudhurst and derailed.

=== Decline and closure ===
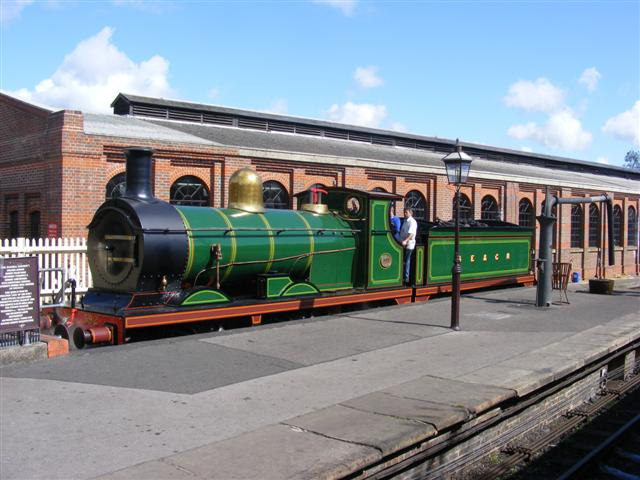
C class No. 592 (BR 31592)

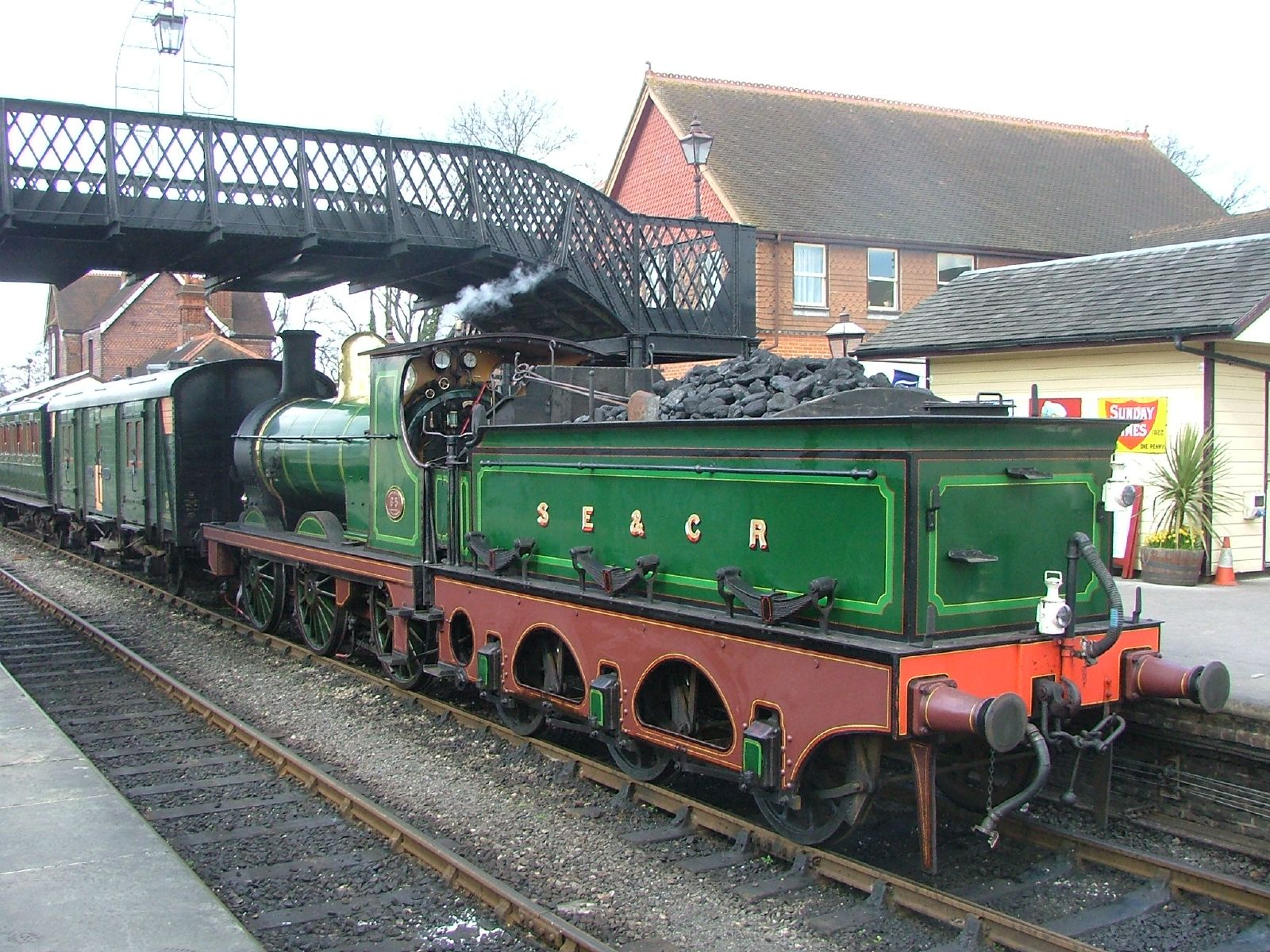
O1 class No. 65 (BR 31065)

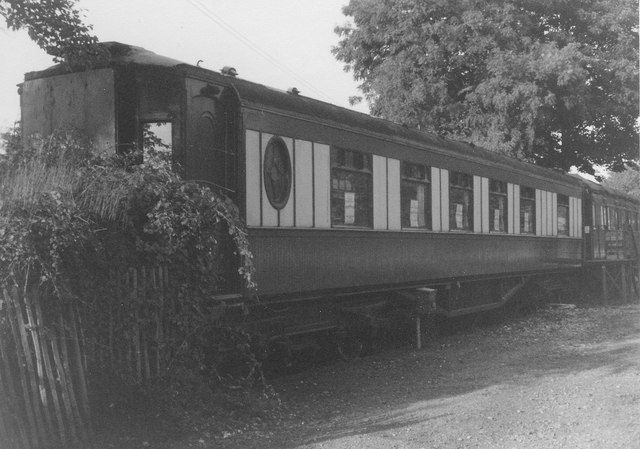
The Pullman carriage Theodora.

The two locomotives which hauled the final passenger train on the line (the special on 11 June 1961), shown after preservation. The Pullman carriage Theodora, then in green livery and numbered S7874, was part of the final passenger train. Seen here in 1980 at Tenterden Town before restoration.

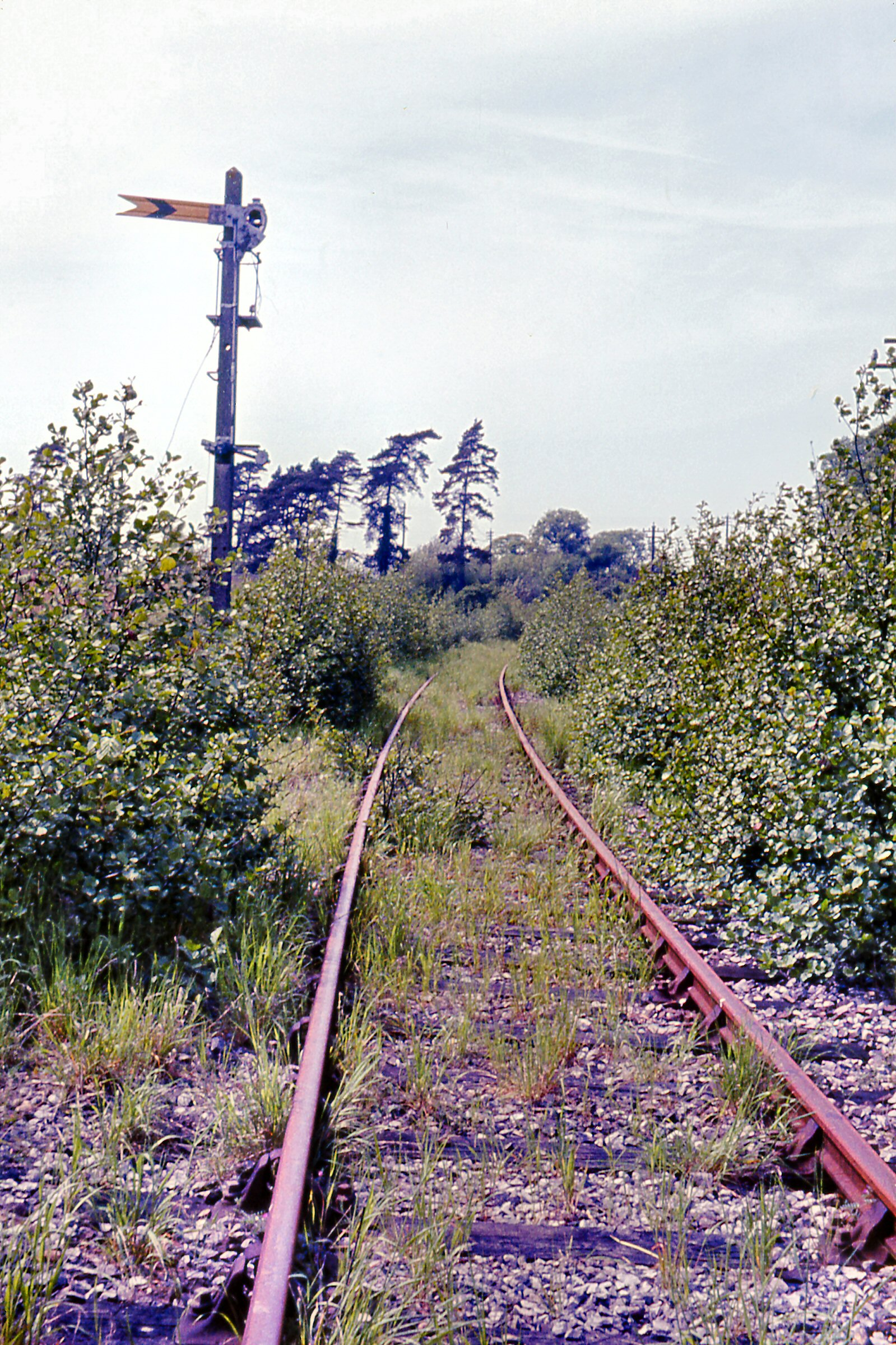
Goudhurst up distant, 1964.

The inconvenient siting of stations and the decline in hop-picking in the area all contributed to diminishing returns on the line by the late 1950s. Apart from the 16:25 daily working from Paddock Wood which was well patronised by children, few trains carried more than a dozen passengers. Passenger journeys were estimated in 1958 at around 170 per day, to which was added around 100 schoolchildren. Even the school traffic was lost once the local authority hired the services of Maidstone & District Motor Company. The line was unpopular with commuters due to the poor connections to and from London. Only the 07:34 service would ensure arrival at Charing Cross before 10:00 with one change at Paddock Wood, the following train at 08.20 would only get the passenger to Cannon Street at 10.15 after two changes. In the evening, the 16:32 departed too early for many commuters while the eleven-coach 18:18 Ramsgate service was overcrowded and divided at Tonbridge where three coaches were detached for Ashford. Hawkhurst-bound passengers had to change at Paddock Wood and cross over to the bay platform for the branch service which arrived in Hawkhurst at 19:58. Locals preferred the direct bus services to Maidstone and Tunbridge Wells over the indirect railway journey, as shown by the fact that no more than 250 return tickets were sold from Hawkhurst in the final years of the line. Only the line's expanding pot plant traffic justified its continuing existence.

It was therefore no surprise when closure notices were posted in March 1961. The last day of regular services was Saturday 10 June 1961 when a pair of C class 0-6-0's replaced the usual H class tanks. The event was recorded by a BBC cameraman who filmed the 09:07 departure from Paddock Wood. The Tonbridge crew had chalked on the cabside of the engine "Shed no tears for the single track, for perhaps we may come back. And if we do, you can be sure, we'll see you all again once more." Later in the day the trains were lengthened with the addition of former LSWR push-pull set No. 656 and a Maunsell corridor coach. The same locomotive worked the last 17:00 train from Hawkhurst, while every seat was taken by locals and railway enthusiasts. The daughter of bandleader Jack Payne was on-hand to toast the final departure.

The line's last public train ran the next day, hauled by Class O1 0-6-0 No. 31065 piloting C class no. 31592. This was part of a railtour organised by the Locomotive Club of Great Britain. Bearing the nameplate "The South Eastern Limited", the train travelled the line as part of its "Farewell to Steam" tour. Later that day it also navigated the remaining section of the K&ESR from Robertsbridge to Tenterden - the northern section to Headcorn having closed in 1954. Amongst the carriages that formed the train was S7874, a Pullman carriage built in 1926. Both locomotives are preserved on the Bluebell Railway. Theodora is preserved on the Kent and East Sussex Railway.

The track was lifted in 1964, the contract for the work was awarded to The Demolition and Construction Co Ltd, of Croydon, Surrey. By March 1964, Goudhurst station yard was in use for the dismantling of track panels into their component parts. Sleepers with chairs attached and rails being loaded separately into goods wagons for removal. The track lifting had been completed by October of that year. The station sites were offered for sale in 1967. Electric services on the South Eastern Main Line through Paddock Wood commenced on 12 June 1961, the first day on which there was no service on the Hawkhurst branch.

=== The Old Pull N' Push TV series ===
Elisabeth Beresford, who was subsequently well known as the creator of The Wombles, wrote a children's book Danger on the "Old Pull 'n Push" based on the Hawkhurst branch. Subsequently, this was televised by Rediffusion for ITV in two six-part series The Old Pull 'n Push and Return of the old Pull 'n Push, shown in 1960–61. These were filmed on the Hawkhurst Line shortly before it closed.

== Present-day scene ==
=== Remains ===
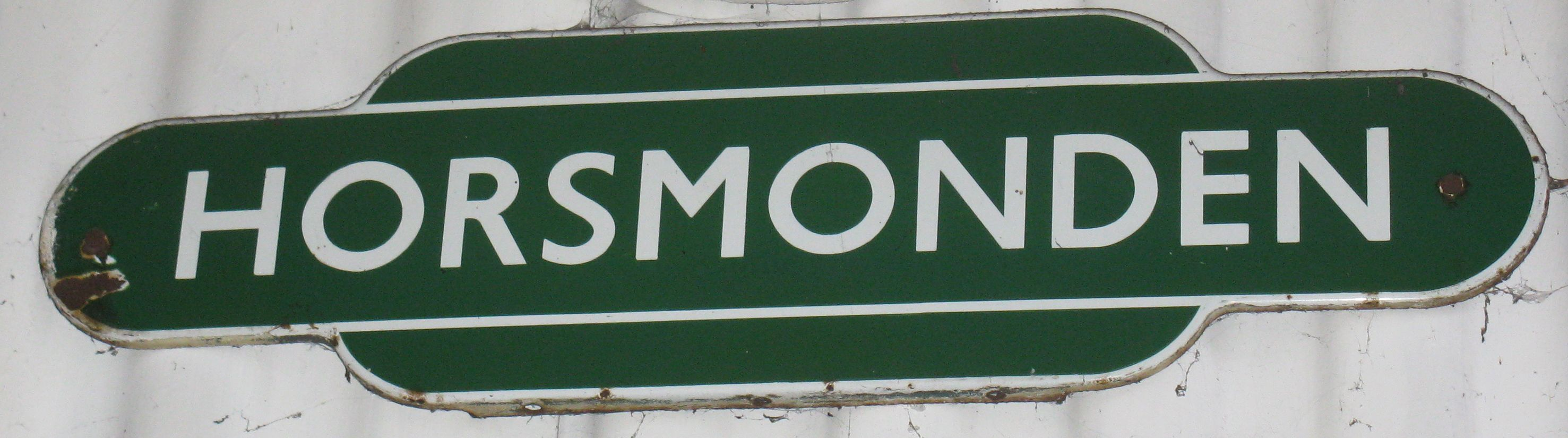
The totem from Horsmonden

The platform bay at Paddock Wood from which most of the line's trains departed is now part of a car park, with the edge of the platform fenced off. Parts of the line are still visible, such as the embankment through Swig's Hole valley and the approach to Horsmonden tunnel. Some bridges still remain, although the plate girder bridge over Goudhurst Road, Horsmonden has been removed.

Horsmonden station has been converted to a private garage trading as the "Old Station Garage", with the old stationmaster's house in use as a private dwelling. A station sign is preserved on the garage wall and part of the platform survives in the workshop. Goudhurst station, yard and level crossing have disappeared as a result of road-widening and residential development; a private house called "Haltwhistle" stands on part of the old goods yard. The old station lights have been re-used along the drive of the house. Cranbrook station was used for many years as a pottery, and its stationmaster's house is now a private dwelling, with part of the goods yard also having survived. The signal box has survived and the station building has been extended to meet with it; the trackbed is now part of the lawn. The site of Hawkhurst station is now occupied by Kent Woodware Co, a wood turnery business. The main station building was demolished in the 1960s but the engine and goods sheds, stationmaster's house and signal box are still extant. The owner, a railway enthusiast, ensures that the signal box receives "a good coat of paint every other year".

=== Proposed cycleway ===
In September 2008 representatives from Hawkhurst, Goudhurst, Horsmonden and Paddock Wood Parish Councils met to discuss the possibility of converting all or part of the former line into a trail which could be used by cyclists and walkers. The proposal was supported by Kent County Council and a 2-mile (3.22 km) section between Hawkhurst and Goudhurst has been identified as being easily convertible into a trail. The remainder to Paddock Wood is said to be "more difficult but not impossible". Horsmonden Parish Council has declined to participate in the scheme on the basis that any trail would not be able to follow the former railway alignment in its area due to private ownerships and in-filled sections. On 10 June 2011, Kent County Council organised a walk of the trackbed from Gills Green to demonstrate the work that would be needed to convert the trackbed for use by walkers and cyclists. The Kent and Sussex Courier reported that the project was keenly supported by all parish councils involved except for Horsmonden. The scheme was initially suggested by Hawkhurst Community Partnership. The proposed cycleway will be known as The Hop Pickers' Line should it be constructed. On 15 July 2011, it was reported that an application for a £1,000,000 grant from the Heritage Lottery Fund was to be made in the coming week, with the result of the application being known in September 2011. In March 2013, it was reported that a decision from the Heritage Lottery Fund was still awaited.

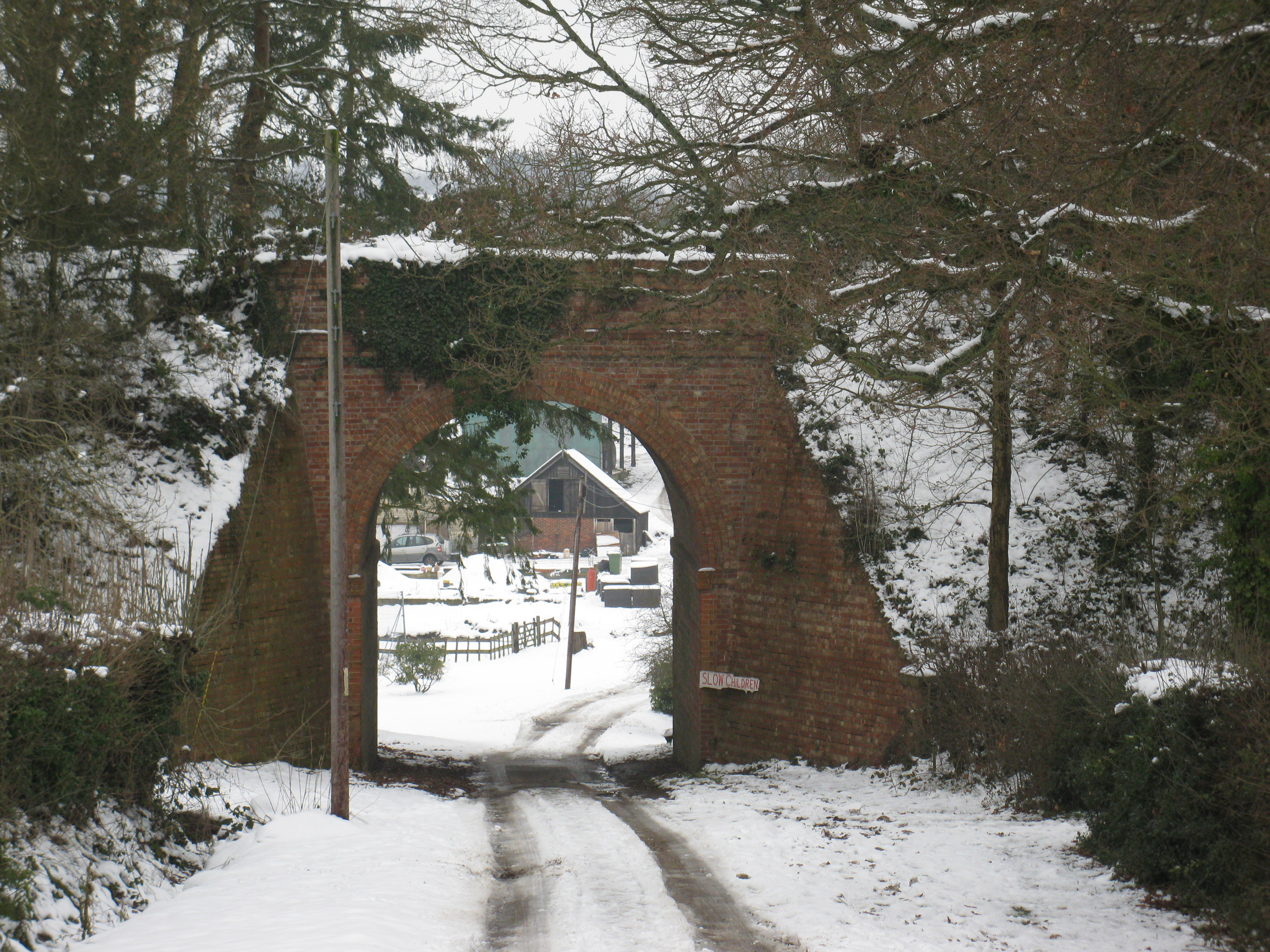
The bridge at Swig's Hole

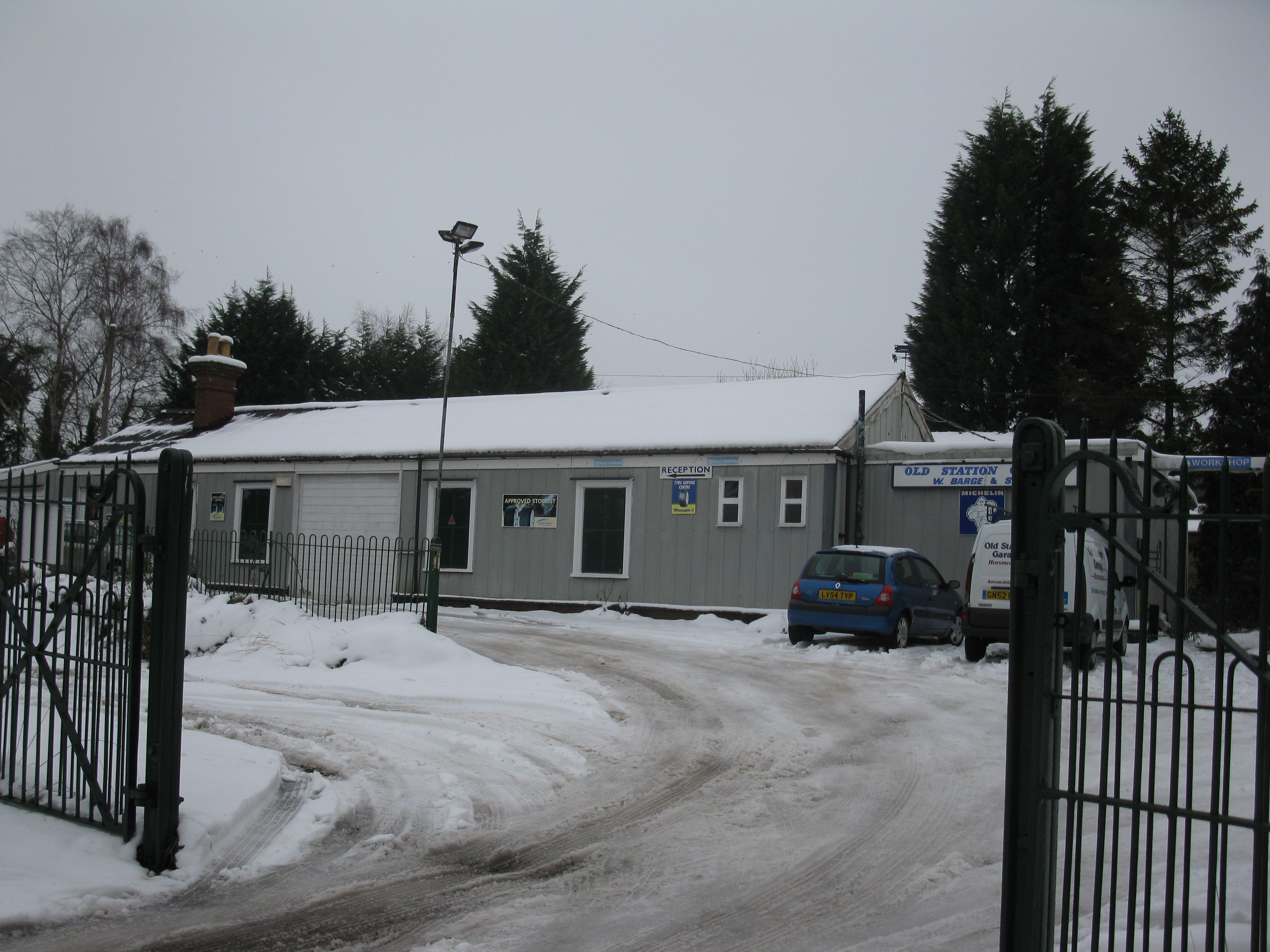
Horsmonden station, January 2010

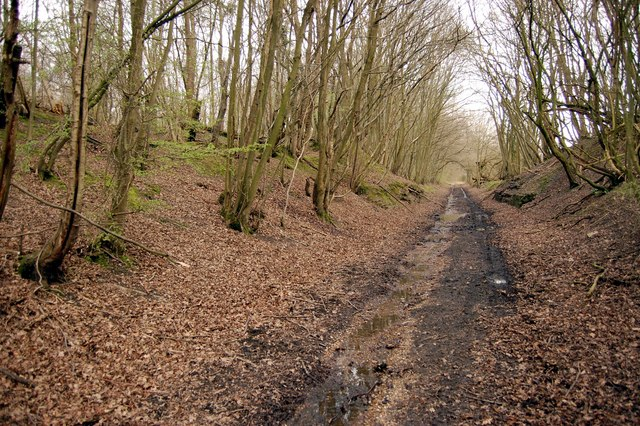
The trackbed between Pattenden Siding and Cranbrook station, March 2008

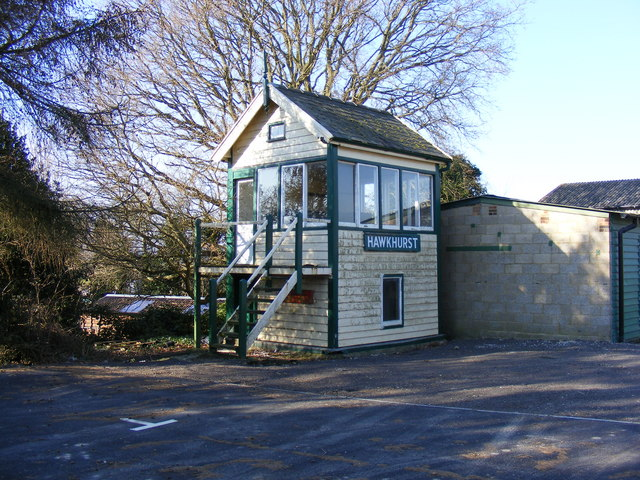
The preserved signal box at Hawkhurst

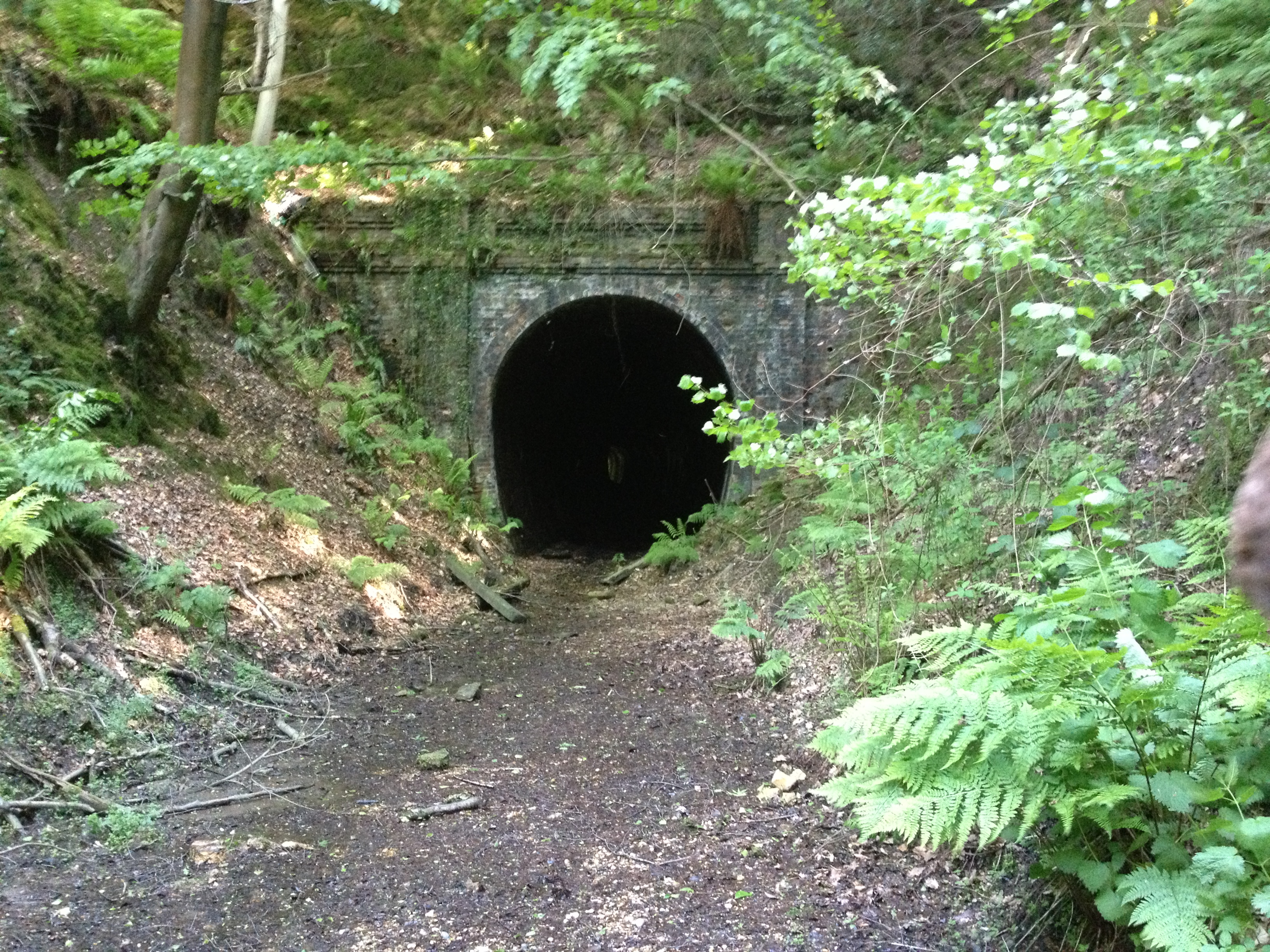
Badgers Oak Tunnel (North Entrance), June 2013

== Sources ==
- Awdry, Christopher (1990). Encyclopaedia of British Railway Companies. London: Guild Publishing. CN 8983.
- Bradley, D.L. (September 1985) [1963]. The Locomotive History of the South Eastern Railway (2nd ed.). London: RCTS. ISBN 0-901115-48-7.
- Course, Edwin Alfred (1974). The Railways of Southern England: Secondary and Branch Lines. London: B.T. Batsford Ltd. ISBN 0-7134-2835-X. OCLC 1231006.
- Esau, Mike; Siviour, Gerald (1993). Kent Coast Heyday. Shepperton: Ian Allan. ISBN 0-7110-2078-7.
- Ford, Antony M. (2008). Pullman Profile No. 1: The 12-wheel Cars. Southampton: Noodle Books. ISBN 978-1-906419-00-4.
- Garrett, S.D. (1999). The Kent & East Sussex Railway (Locomotion Papers No. 56). Usk, Mon.: The Oakwood Press. ISBN 978-0-85361-516-3. OCLC 43502036.
- Harding, Peter A. (1993). The Colonel Stephens Railways in Kent. Woking: Peter A. Harding. ISBN 0-9509414-9-2. OCLC 59933498.
- Harding, Peter A. (1998) [1982]. The Hawkhurst Branch Line. Woking: Peter A. Harding. ISBN 0-9523458-3-8. OCLC 42005158.
- Hart, Brian (2000). The Hawkhurst Branch. Didcot, Oxon: Wild Swan Publications Ltd. ISBN 1-874103-54-2. OCLC 59535045.
- Hart, Brian (November 2009). The Kent & East Sussex Railway. Didcot, Oxon: Wild Swan Publications Ltd. ISBN 978-1-905184-57-6.
- Mitchell, Victor E.; Smith, Keith A. (August 1989). Branch Line to Hawkhurst. Midhurst, West Sussex: Middleton Press. ISBN 978-0-906520-66-6. OCLC 24952241.
- Morel, Julian (1983). Pullman. Newton Abbot: David & Charles. ISBN 0-7153-8382-5.
- Morrison, Brian; Beer, Brian (May 1994). British Railways Past and Present: Kent and East Sussex (No. 20). Wadenhoe, Peterborough: Silver Link Publishing Ltd. ISBN 978-1-85895-044-0. OCLC 54046772.
- Oppitz, Leslie (2003). Lost Railways of Kent. Newbury, Berks: Countryside Books. ISBN 978-1-85306-803-4. OCLC 52565653.
- Scott-Morgan, John (2008). Branches & Byways - Kent. Hersham: Oxford Publishing Co. ISBN 978-0-86093-616-9. OCLC 233788389.
- St John Thomas, David (1985) [1922]. Bradshaw's July 1922 Railway Guide. London: Guild Publishing. ISBN 978-0-7153-8708-5. OCLC 12500436.
- Tyson, Colin (2013). Battle for Bluebell. Horncastle: Morton's Media Ltd. ISBN 978-1-909128-26-2.
- Vallance, H.A. (February 1955). "Through the Wealden Hills to Hawkhurst" (PDF). The Railway Magazine. Vol. 101, no. 646. Westminster: Tothill Press. pp. 121–125. ISSN 0033-8923.
- White, H.P. (March 1960). "The Hawkhurst Branch of the S.R.". Trains Illustrated. Vol. XIII, no. 138. Hampton Court, Surrey: Ian Allan Ltd. pp. 170–173.
- White, H.P. (1987). Forgotten Railways: South-East England (Vol. 6). Newton Abbot, Devon: David & Charles. ISBN 978-0-946537-37-2. OCLC 14691764.
- White, H.P. (1992). A Regional History of the Railways of Great Britain: Southern England (Volume 2). Nairn, Scotland: David St John Thomas. ISBN 978-0-946537-77-8. OCLC 27655323.
- Sectional Appendix to the Working Timetable and Books of Rules and Regulations. Waterloo Station: British Railways Southern Region, South Eastern Division. 1960.
