= Cranbrook railway station =

Cranbrook railway station may refer to either of two railway stations in England:

- Cranbrook railway station (Devon) (opened in 2015)
- Cranbrook railway station (Kent) (open as a station 1893–1961)
