= Ruth Thomas (novelist) =

British writer

- Born: 7 July 1967 (age 59); Horsmonden, Kent, England
- Occupation: Novelist
- Writing career
- Period: 1994–present
- Genres: Literary fiction, Short Stories
- Notable works: Things to Make and Mend, Super Girl, The Home Corner
- Website: ruth-thomas.com

Ruth Thomas (born 7 July 1967 in Horsmonden, Kent) is a British writer of novels and short stories.

== Biography ==
Thomas studied English literature at the University of Edinburgh, then worked in various administrative jobs in the private and voluntary sector before turning to writing. Her first collection of short stories, Sea Monster Tattoo, was shortlisted for the John Llewellyn Rhys Prize and the Scottish Best First Book of the Year Award. Her second collection, The Dance Settee won a Scottish Arts Council Book Award. Both books were published by Polygon, which is now an imprint of Birlinn Limited. Her first novel, Things to Make and Mend, was published in 2007 by Faber and won a Good Housekeeping Book Award (Most Entertaining Read). Her latest collection of short stories, Super Girl, was published in 2009 also by Faber. Rock of Ages from that collection was runner up for the 2009 V. S. Pritchett memorial prize of the Royal Society of Literature. Her second novel, The Home Corner, was published in 2013.

Thomas lives in Edinburgh with her three children and husband, Mike Norman.

== Works ==
=== Novels ===
- Things to Make and Mend (2007), Faber & Faber
  - Available as an audio book read by Finty Williams from BBC Audio Books
  - Translated into Dutch as Vaardigheden Voor Meisjes by Inge de Heer for De Bezige Bij
- The Home Corner (2013), Faber & Faber
- The Snow and the Works on the Northern Line (2021), ISBN 9781913207366

=== Collections of short stories ===
- Sea Monster Tattoo (1997) Polygon
- The Dance Settee (1999) Polygon
- Super Girl (2009) Faber & Faber

Ruth Thomas has been anthologised in collections since 1990. Her stories appear regularly on BBC Radio.
