= Listed buildings in Horsmonden =

Civil Parish in Kent, England

Horsmonden is a village and civil parish in the Borough of Tunbridge Wells of Kent, England. It contains 131 listed buildings that are recorded in the National Heritage List for England. Of these one is grade I, seven are grade II* and 123 are grade II.

This list is based on the information retrieved online from Historic England.

== Key ==
Grade	Criteria
I	Buildings that are of exceptional interest
II*	Particularly important buildings of more than special interest
II	Buildings that are of special interest

== Listing ==
Name	Grade	Location	Type	Completed (Note: The date given is the date used by Historic England as significant for the initial building or that of an important part in the structure's description.)	Date designated	Grid ref. (Note: The grid reference is based on the British national grid reference system, sometimes known as OSGB36, used by the Ordnance Survey.) Geo-coordinates	Notes	Entry number (Note: The "List Entry Number" is a unique number assigned to each listed building and scheduled monument by Historic England.)	Image	Wikidata
Poplars Including Garden Railings to the North	II				24 August 1990	TQ7024942551; 51°09′25″N 0°25′59″E		1277637	Upload Photo	Q26567037
Milestone Cottages	II	1 and 2, Brenchley Road			10 October 1989	TQ6963540523; 51°08′20″N 0°25′24″E		1084547	Upload Photo	Q26368267
Barn About 5 Metres South East of Mill House	II	Brick Kiln Lane			10 October 1989	TQ7137139562; 51°07′47″N 0°26′52″E		1338769	Upload Photo	Q26623063
Chest Tomb of Richard and Alice Tyler, About 1 Metre North of Church of St Margaret	II	Brick Kiln Lane			10 October 1989	TQ7038638123; 51°07′01″N 0°25′59″E		1086954	Upload Photo	Q26379396
Chest Tomb of Thomas Twort, About 15 Metres South East of Church of St Margaret	II	Brick Kiln Lane			10 October 1989	TQ7039938094; 51°07′00″N 0°26′00″E		1086957	Upload Photo	Q26379411
Church Barn	II	Brick Kiln Lane			11 August 1977	TQ7041938141; 51°07′02″N 0°26′01″E		1084552	Upload Photo	Q26368274
Church Cottage	II	Brick Kiln Lane			10 October 1989	TQ7037938141; 51°07′02″N 0°25′59″E		1084551	Upload Photo	Q26368273
Church Lodge	II	Brick Kiln Lane			10 October 1989	TQ7037638229; 51°07′05″N 0°25′59″E		1084550	Upload Photo	Q26368271
Church of St Margaret	I	Brick Kiln Lane	church building		20 October 1954	TQ7038338112; 51°07′01″N 0°25′59″E		1087022	Church of St Margaret More images	Q17530347
Mill House Millers Cottage	II	Brick Kiln Lane			10 October 1989	TQ7138339575; 51°07′47″N 0°26′53″E		1084548	Upload Photo	Q26368268
Mounting Block About 20 Metres North of Church of St Margaret	II	Brick Kiln Lane			10 October 1989	TQ7039738134; 51°07′02″N 0°26′00″E		1084555	Upload Photo	Q26368279
Oasthouse About 20 Metres North of Church Cottage	II	Brick Kiln Lane			10 October 1989	TQ7037138171; 51°07′03″N 0°25′58″E		1338771	Upload Photo	Q26623065
Old Nevergood Farmhouse	II	Brick Kiln Lane			10 October 1989	TQ7064539201; 51°07′36″N 0°26′14″E		1338768	Upload Photo	Q26623062
Pair of Chest Tombs of Cole Family, About 20 Metres South East of Church of St Margaret	II	Brick Kiln Lane			10 October 1989	TQ7040538086; 51°07′00″N 0°26′00″E		1338773	Upload Photo	Q26623067
Park Lodge	II	Brick Kiln Lane			10 October 1989	TQ7067238883; 51°07′26″N 0°26′15″E		1338770	Upload Photo	Q26623064
Railed Chest Tomb of Hodgkin Family and Railed Enclosure Attached, About 25 Metres South East of Church of St Margaret	II	Brick Kiln Lane			10 October 1989	TQ7041138080; 51°07′00″N 0°26′00″E		1086938	Upload Photo	Q26379326
Railed Chest Tomb of Twort Family, About 10 Metres South of Church of St Margaret	II	Brick Kiln Lane			10 October 1989	TQ7038338092; 51°07′00″N 0°25′59″E		1084553	Upload Photo	Q26368276
Railed Tomb of Austen Family, About 4 Metres South West of Church of St Margaret	II	Brick Kiln Lane			10 October 1989	TQ7036838096; 51°07′01″N 0°25′58″E		1086986	Upload Photo	Q26379478
Railed Tomb of Tompsett Family, About 3 Metres South West of Church of St Margaret	II	Brick Kiln Lane			10 October 1989	TQ7037038100; 51°07′01″N 0°25′58″E		1338772	Upload Photo	Q26623066
Share Farmhouse	II	Brick Kiln Lane			10 October 1989	TQ7146539288; 51°07′38″N 0°26′56″E		1084549	Upload Photo	Q26368270
Wooden Inscription Board to Pierce Family, About 20 Metres North East of Church of St Margaret	II	Brick Kiln Lane			10 October 1989	TQ7040438131; 51°07′02″N 0°26′00″E		1084554	Upload Photo	Q26368277
August Pitts and Walls Attached	II	Churn Lane			10 October 1989	TQ7034343293; 51°09′49″N 0°26′06″E		1338774	Upload Photo	Q26623068
Barn About 20 Metres North of Poplars	II	Churn Lane			10 October 1989	TQ7026142586; 51°09′26″N 0°26′00″E		1084556	Upload Photo	Q26368280
Poplars Poplars Farmhouse and Wall Attached	II	Churn Lane			10 October 1989	TQ7025442548; 51°09′25″N 0°26′00″E		1104923	Upload Photo	Q26398882
Swigs Hole Farmhouse	II	Furnace Lane			20 October 1954	TQ7037441627; 51°08′55″N 0°26′04″E		1104909	Upload Photo	Q26398868
Broadford	II*	Goudhurst Road			20 October 1954	TQ7130639689; 51°07′51″N 0°26′49″E		1326674	Upload Photo	Q17547704
Cluncher Cottage	II	Goudhurst Road			20 October 1954	TQ7034340435; 51°08′16″N 0°26′01″E		1338775	Upload Photo	Q26623069
Coachhouse About 3 Metres South of Spring Farmhouse	II	Goudhurst Road			10 October 1989	TQ7068540309; 51°08′12″N 0°26′18″E		1084560	Upload Photo	Q26368286
Coachhouse/house About 20 Metres West of Spring Farmhouse	II	Goudhurst Road			10 October 1989	TQ7067040306; 51°08′12″N 0°26′17″E		1105641	Upload Photo	Q26399576
Dolphin House	II	Goudhurst Road			10 October 1989	TQ7014240446; 51°08′17″N 0°25′50″E		1084563	Upload Photo	Q26368291
Oast House at 7055 4031	II	Goudhurst Road			10 October 1989	TQ7055340323; 51°08′12″N 0°26′11″E		1084561	Upload Photo	Q26368288
Old Bassetts Cottages	II	1 and 2, Goudhurst Road			10 October 1954	TQ7060840348; 51°08′13″N 0°26′14″E		1326669	Upload Photo	Q26612136
South Lodge	II	Goudhurst Road			10 October 1954	TQ7132839756; 51°07′53″N 0°26′50″E		1084557	Upload Photo	Q26368282
Spring Farmhouse and Railed Forecourt	II	Goudhurst Road			10 October 1989	TQ7068640319; 51°08′12″N 0°26′18″E		1326257	Upload Photo	Q26611752
Stable Block to East of Broadford	II	Goudhurst Road			20 October 1954	TQ7126939703; 51°07′52″N 0°26′47″E		1084558	Upload Photo	Q26368283
Tainter Mead	II	Goudhurst Road			10 October 1989	TQ7109840022; 51°08′02″N 0°26′39″E		1104866	Upload Photo	Q26398833
Tanyard House	II	Goudhurst Road			20 October 1954	TQ7024740401; 51°08′15″N 0°25′56″E		1084562	Upload Photo	Q26368289
Wall and Railings Approximately 7 Metres North of Tanyard House	II	Goudhurst Road			10 October 1989	TQ7024740414; 51°08′16″N 0°25′56″E		1105650	Upload Photo	Q26399586
Weavers	II	Goudhurst Road			20 October 1954	TQ7086040226; 51°08′09″N 0°26′27″E		1084559	Upload Photo	Q26368285
Mableford Cottage and Clock View Cottage	II	Green Road, TN12 8JS			10 October 1989	TQ7014140610; 51°08′22″N 0°25′51″E		1338519	Upload Photo	Q26622834
The Granary	II	Grovehurst Farm, Grovehurst Lane, Tonbridge, TN12 8BQ			10 October 1989	TQ7159240783; 51°08′26″N 0°27′05″E		1338796	Upload Photo	Q26623088
Capel Manor House, Including the Remains of the Winter Garden and the Arcaded Retaining Wall with Balustrade and Steps Belonging to An Earlier House	II*	Grovehurst Lane	building		18 September 2013	TQ7133140019; 51°08′02″N 0°26′51″E		1413746	Capel Manor House, Including the Remains of the Winter Garden and the Arcaded Retaining Wall with Balustrade and Steps Belonging to An Earlier House More images	Q5035242
Grovehurst Oast	II	Grovehurst Lane, Tonbridge, TN12 8BQ			10 October 1989	TQ7160240805; 51°08′27″N 0°27′06″E		1084524	Upload Photo	Q26368233
Willow Barn	II	Grovehurst Lane, Tonbridge, TN12 8BQ			10 October 1989	TQ7162940761; 51°08′25″N 0°27′07″E		1106227	Upload Photo	Q26400110
Capel Cross	II	Grovehurst Road			10 October 1989	TQ7115440095; 51°08′04″N 0°26′42″E		1084526	Upload Photo	Q26368236
Capel Cross Cottage	II	Grovehurst Road			10 October 1989	TQ7116940072; 51°08′04″N 0°26′43″E		1084564	Upload Photo	Q26368292
Capel Cross Cottage	II	1 and 2, Grovehurst Road			10 October 1989	TQ7114439992; 51°08′01″N 0°26′41″E		1106246	Upload Photo	Q26400125
Cottage Drum and Monkey House	II	Grovehurst Road			20 October 1954	TQ7117240160; 51°08′06″N 0°26′43″E		1084525	Upload Photo	Q26368235
Grovehurst	II*	Grovehurst Road			20 October 1954	TQ7160540722; 51°08′24″N 0°27′06″E		1338776	Upload Photo	Q17547765
North Lodge	II	Grovehurst Road			10 October 1989	TQ7133640266; 51°08′10″N 0°26′51″E		1325997	Upload Photo	Q26611506
Granary/garage About 30 Metres North of Haymans Hill Farmhouse	II	Haymans Hill			10 October 1989	TQ7100341370; 51°08′46″N 0°26′36″E		1338798	Upload Photo	Q26623090
Haymans Hill Farmhouse	II	Haymans Hill			10 October 1989	TQ7100941331; 51°08′45″N 0°26′36″E		1338797	Upload Photo	Q26623089
Oasthouse About 50 Metres West of Haymans Hill	II	Haymans Hill			10 October 1989	TQ7103541331; 51°08′44″N 0°26′38″E		1084528	Upload Photo	Q26368239
Walled Garden to East of Haymans Hill Farmhouse	II	Haymans Hill			10 October 1989	TQ7104041295; 51°08′43″N 0°26′38″E		1084527	Upload Photo	Q26368237
Ashdown Farmhouse	II	Lamberhurst Road			10 October 1989	TQ6959539849; 51°07′58″N 0°25′21″E		1338800	Upload Photo	Q26623092
Barn About 65 Metres South West of Sprivers	II	Lamberhurst Road			10 October 1989	TQ6929839926; 51°08′01″N 0°25′06″E		1325190	Upload Photo	Q26610770
Barn About 75 Metres South West of Sprivers	II	Lamberhurst Road			10 October 1989	TQ6928639931; 51°08′01″N 0°25′05″E		1338762	Upload Photo	Q26623056
Game Larder About 10 Metres North of Sprivers	II	Lamberhurst Road			10 October 1989	TQ6932839984; 51°08′03″N 0°25′08″E		1107884	Upload Photo	Q26401672
Gate House	II	Lamberhurst Road			10 October 1989	TQ6959539759; 51°07′55″N 0°25′21″E		1106288	Upload Photo	Q26400165
Penhall Cottage Tudor Cottage	II	Lamberhurst Road			10 October 1989	TQ6976740100; 51°08′06″N 0°25′30″E		1107202	Upload Photo	Q26401012
Pullens Farmhouse	II	Lamberhurst Road			10 October 1989	TQ6891938883; 51°07′28″N 0°24′45″E		1084529	Upload Photo	Q26368240
Remingtons	II	Lamberhurst Road			20 October 1954	TQ6979440240; 51°08′11″N 0°25′32″E		1084531	Upload Photo	Q26368243
Sandhole and Wall Attached	II	Lamberhurst Road			10 October 1989	TQ6929739491; 51°07′47″N 0°25′05″E		1338799	Upload Photo	Q26623091
Sprivers Cottages	II	Lamberhurst Road			10 October 1989	TQ6948239664; 51°07′52″N 0°25′15″E		1084530	Upload Photo	Q26368242
Sprivers and Wall Attached	II*	Lamberhurst Road	building		20 October 1954	TQ6934039968; 51°08′02″N 0°25′08″E		1107213	Sprivers and Wall Attached More images	Q17547403
Stable Block and Walled Courtyard to Rear About 50 Metres North of Sprivers	II	Lamberhurst Road			10 October 1989	TQ6935040013; 51°08′04″N 0°25′09″E		1084533	Upload Photo	Q26368246
Tompsett's Cottage	II	Lamberhurst Road			10 October 1989	TQ6977940222; 51°08′10″N 0°25′31″E		1084532	Upload Photo	Q26368245
Walls and Railings Surrounding Remingtons	II	Lamberhurst Road			10 October 1989	TQ6979840258; 51°08′11″N 0°25′32″E		1107207	Upload Photo	Q26401018
Lewes Heath	II	Lewes Heath			10 October 1989	TQ7019939441; 51°07′44″N 0°25′52″E		1084534	Upload Photo	Q26368248
All Saints Roman Catholic Church	II	Maidstone Road, Tonbridge, TN12 8DQ	vacation property		29 October 2013	TQ7050841452; 51°08′49″N 0°26′11″E		1416955	All Saints Roman Catholic Church More images	Q26676560
Appletree Cottage	II	Maidstone Road			10 October 1989	TQ7022640919; 51°08′32″N 0°25′55″E		1325193	Upload Photo	Q26610773
Barn About 20 Metres South of Bennets House	II	Maidstone Road			10 October 1989	TQ7131943088; 51°09′41″N 0°26′55″E		1120873	Upload Photo	Q26414076
Barn About 75 Metres North of Bennets House	II	Maidstone Road			10 October 1989	TQ7133743194; 51°09′44″N 0°26′56″E		1338765	Upload Photo	Q26623059
Bassetts Farmhouse and Oasthouse Attached	II	Maidstone Road			10 October 1989	TQ7128543280; 51°09′47″N 0°26′54″E		1322991	Upload Photo	Q26608753
Bennets House	II	Maidstone Road			10 October 1989	TQ7130843116; 51°09′42″N 0°26′55″E		1084537	Upload Photo	Q26368252
Brambles Place	II	Maidstone Road			10 October 1989	TQ7114242998; 51°09′38″N 0°26′46″E		1084538	Upload Photo	Q26368254
Castlemaine Farm Cottage	II	Maidstone Road			10 October 1989	TQ7087342499; 51°09′22″N 0°26′31″E		1323752	Upload Photo	Q26609452
Corner Cottage	II	Maidstone Road			10 October 1989	TQ7073341773; 51°08′59″N 0°26′23″E		1107849	Upload Photo	Q26401641
Heathleigh Cottages	II	Maidstone Road			10 October 1989	TQ7007040718; 51°08′26″N 0°25′47″E		1084541	Upload Photo	Q26368258
Kirkins Farmhouse	II	Maidstone Road			10 October 1989	TQ7002941036; 51°08′36″N 0°25′46″E		1084539	Upload Photo	Q26368255
Oasthouse About 50 Metres East of Castlemaine Farm Cottage	II	Maidstone Road			10 October 1989	TQ7092542490; 51°09′22″N 0°26′34″E		1338764	Upload Photo	Q26623058
Oasthouse and Wall Attached About 15 Metres North East of Kirkins Farmhouse	II	Maidstone Road			10 October 1989	TQ7003941054; 51°08′37″N 0°25′46″E		1121123	Upload Photo	Q26414305
Rams Hill	II	Maidstone Road			10 October 1989	TQ7079942152; 51°09′11″N 0°26′27″E		1338763	Upload Photo	Q26623057
Small Barn About 20 Metres East of Kirkins Farmhouse	II	Maidstone Road			10 October 1989	TQ7006641025; 51°08′36″N 0°25′47″E		1084540	Upload Photo	Q26368257
Stable Block and Wall Attached with Hand Pump About 25 Metres South East of Kirkins Farmhouse	II	Maidstone Road			10 October 1989	TQ7006341018; 51°08′35″N 0°25′47″E		1323016	Upload Photo	Q26608777
Stable, Now Farm Shop About 30 Metres North East of Castlemaine Farm Cottage	II	Maidstone Road			10 October 1989	TQ7089742522; 51°09′23″N 0°26′33″E		1120861	Upload Photo	Q26414065
Styles Farmhouse	II	Maidstone Road			10 October 1989	TQ7042341255; 51°08′43″N 0°26′06″E		1084536	Upload Photo	Q26368251
Styles Yard Cottage and Oasthouse	II	Maidstone Road			17 November 1987	TQ7039941251; 51°08′43″N 0°26′05″E		1084535	Upload Photo	Q26368249
Westernhanger	II	Maidstone Road			10 October 1989	TQ7063441612; 51°08′54″N 0°26′18″E		1119621	Upload Photo	Q26412932
Barn About 15 Metres East of Ruck Farmhouse	II	Marle Place Road			10 October 1989	TQ6882839498; 51°07′48″N 0°24′41″E		1084542	Upload Photo	Q26368260
Hale Farmhouse	II*	Marle Place Road			20 October 1954	TQ6860139271; 51°07′40″N 0°24′29″E		1322819	Upload Photo	Q17547698
Oasthouse About 30 Metres North East of Hale Farmhouse	II	Marle Place Road			10 October 1989	TQ6861739306; 51°07′42″N 0°24′30″E		1084543	Upload Photo	Q26368261
Ruck Farmhouse	II	Marle Place Road			10 October 1989	TQ6880139499; 51°07′48″N 0°24′40″E		1121538	Upload Photo	Q26414703
Barn, Outbuilding and Former Stables Immediately North West of Poplars	II	Outbuilding And Former Stables Immediately North West Of Poplars			24 August 1990	TQ7025342579; 51°09′26″N 0°26′00″E		1277670	Upload Photo	Q26567069
Coachhouse/cart Sheds About 50 Metres South West of Rectory Park	II	Rectory Park Road			10 October 1989	TQ7028938760; 51°07′22″N 0°25′55″E		1338177	Upload Photo	Q26622525
Linden	II	Rectory Park Road			10 October 1989	TQ6994638642; 51°07′19″N 0°25′37″E		1338766	Upload Photo	Q26623060
Rectory Park the Old Rectory	II*	Rectory Park Road			20 October 1954	TQ7032938806; 51°07′24″N 0°25′57″E		1338186	Upload Photo	Q17547723
Stable Block and Walled Gardens About 50 Metres West of Rectory Park	II	Rectory Park Road			10 October 1989	TQ7027438778; 51°07′23″N 0°25′54″E		1084544	Upload Photo	Q26368262
Ash Farmhouse	II	Schoolhouse Lane			10 October 1989	TQ7211141053; 51°08′34″N 0°27′33″E		1084503	Upload Photo	Q26368204
Bainden Farmhouse	II	Schoolhouse Lane			10 October 1989	TQ7246941515; 51°08′49″N 0°27′52″E		1084505	Upload Photo	Q26368207
Barn About 15 Metres South of School House Farmhouse	II	Schoolhouse Lane			10 October 1989	TQ7218441346; 51°08′44″N 0°27′37″E		1084504	Upload Photo	Q26368205
Barn About 20 Metres North of Smalls Farmhouse	II	Schoolhouse Lane			10 October 1989	TQ7213541543; 51°08′50″N 0°27′35″E		1084507	Upload Photo	Q26368210
Barn, Now House with Outhouses About 20 Metres North West of Baiden Farm	II	Schoolhouse Lane			10 October 1989	TQ7248141538; 51°08′50″N 0°27′52″E		1338786	Upload Photo	Q26623079
Lampkyns	II	Schoolhouse Lane			10 October 1989	TQ7168641160; 51°08′38″N 0°27′11″E		1338788	Upload Photo	Q26623081
Northiam Farm Cottages	II	1 and 2, Schoolhouse Lane			10 October 1989	TQ7210041726; 51°08′56″N 0°27′33″E		1084506	Upload Photo	Q26368208
School House Farmhouse	II	Schoolhouse Lane			10 October 1989	TQ7219941375; 51°08′45″N 0°27′38″E		1338785	Upload Photo	Q26623078
Smalls Farmhouse	II	Schoolhouse Lane			20 October 1954	TQ7214341520; 51°08′49″N 0°27′35″E		1338787	Upload Photo	Q26623080
Barn and Outhouses About 20 Metres North of Park Farmhouse	II	Small Bridge Road			10 October 1989	TQ7063838703; 51°07′20″N 0°26′13″E		1122015	Upload Photo	Q26415148
Oasthouse About 50 Metres North of Park Farmhouse	II	Small Bridge Road			10 October 1989	TQ7067238723; 51°07′21″N 0°26′15″E		1084508	Upload Photo	Q26368211
Park Farmhouse	II	Small Bridge Road			10 October 1989	TQ7064738664; 51°07′19″N 0°26′13″E		1084509	Upload Photo	Q26368213
Barn About 30 Metres West of Elphicks	II	Spelmonden Road			10 October 1989	TQ7000237921; 51°06′55″N 0°25′39″E		1338790	Upload Photo	Q26623082
Elphicks	II	Spelmonden Road			10 October 1989	TQ7000437983; 51°06′57″N 0°25′39″E		1084510	Upload Photo	Q26368214
Oasthouse About 30 Metres North of Spelmonden	II	Spelmonden Road			10 October 1989	TQ7022737211; 51°06′32″N 0°25′49″E		1338528	Upload Photo	Q26622843
Spelmonden with Walls Attached	II*	Spelmonden Road			20 October 1954	TQ7024637168; 51°06′31″N 0°25′50″E		1338789	Upload Photo	Q17547770
Stable Or Animal House About 30 Metres West of Elphicks	II	Spelmonden Road			10 October 1989	TQ6998937933; 51°06′56″N 0°25′38″E		1338517	Upload Photo	Q26622832
Walls and Stable Range Attached to South and East of Elphicks	II	Spelmonden Road			10 October 1989	TQ7001637960; 51°06′57″N 0°25′40″E		1121963	Upload Photo	Q26415099
Birch Cottage	II	The Heath			10 October 1989	TQ7010840523; 51°08′19″N 0°25′49″E		1084512	Upload Photo	Q26368217
Crowhursts' Shop with Wall Attached Heathside	II	The Heath			10 October 1989	TQ7006840526; 51°08′19″N 0°25′47″E		1338791	Upload Photo	Q26623083
Happys	II	The Heath, TN12 8HU			10 October 1989	TQ6998940550; 51°08′20″N 0°25′43″E		1121948	Upload Photo	Q26415087
Heath Cottage	II	The Heath			10 October 1989	TQ6999640614; 51°08′22″N 0°25′43″E		1121950	Upload Photo	Q26415089
Heath Court	II	The Heath			30 September 1969	TQ6999240595; 51°08′22″N 0°25′43″E		1338792	Upload Photo	Q26623084
Manchester House with the Post Office and Heath Stores	II	The Heath			10 October 1989	TQ7000840521; 51°08′19″N 0°25′44″E		1084513	Upload Photo	Q26368218
The Gun and Spitroast Public House and Rear Courtyard	II	The Heath	pub		10 October 1989	TQ7004540511; 51°08′19″N 0°25′45″E		1121941	The Gun and Spitroast Public House and Rear Courtyard More images	Q26415081
The Limes Cottage	II	The Heath			10 October 1989	TQ7014040624; 51°08′23″N 0°25′51″E		1084511	Upload Photo	Q26368215
Outbuildings, Walls and Rear Courtyard North of Sprivers	II	Lamberhurst Road			10 October 1989	TQ6932339971; 51°08′02″N 0°25′07″E		1338761	Upload Photo	Q26623055
Barn About 30 Metres South of Yew Tree Farmhouse	II	Yew Tree Green Road			10 October 1989	TQ7034942096; 51°09′10″N 0°26′04″E		1121951	Upload Photo	Q26415090
Barn About 50 Metres South of Yew Tree Farmhouse	II	Yew Tree Green Road			10 October 1989	TQ7037242073; 51°09′09″N 0°26′05″E		1338793	Upload Photo	Q26623085
Old Barn Cottage	II	Yew Tree Green Road, Tonbridge, TN12 8HR			10 October 1989	TQ7050242144; 51°09′11″N 0°26′12″E		1121920	Upload Photo	Q26415061
Yew Tree Cottage	II	Yew Tree Green Road			10 October 1989	TQ7045942141; 51°09′11″N 0°26′10″E		1084515	Upload Photo	Q26368221
Yew Tree Farmhouse	II	Yew Tree Green Road			10 October 1989	TQ7035442121; 51°09′11″N 0°26′04″E		1084514	Upload Photo	Q26368220

== See also ==
- Grade I listed buildings in Kent
- Grade II* listed buildings in Kent

== Sources ==
- Newman, John (2012) [1969], Kent: West and the Weald, The Buildings of England, New Haven and London: Yale University Press, ISBN 978-0-300-18509-6
