= Horsmonden railway station =

Disused railway station in Kent

Coordinates: 51.1373°N 0.4365°E

Horsmonden
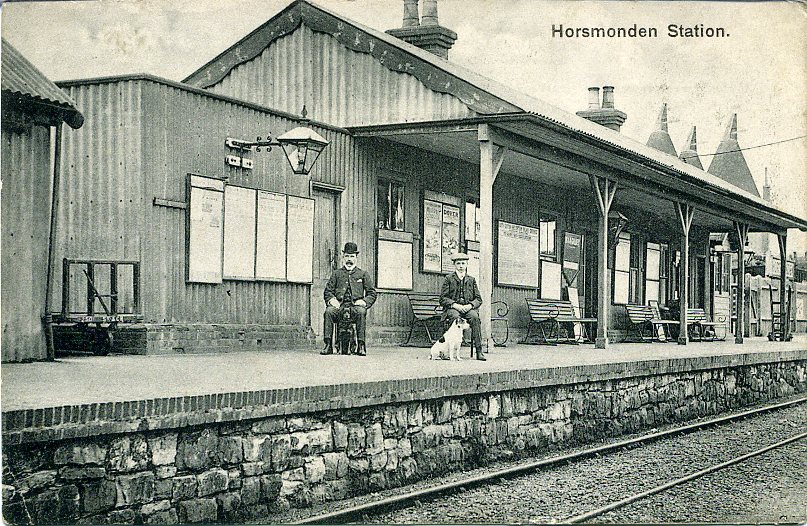

General information
- Location: Horsmonden, Tunbridge Wells, Kent; England
- Grid reference: TQ705404
- Platforms: 1

Other information
- Status: Disused

History
- Original company: Cranbrook and Paddock Wood Railway
- Pre-grouping: South Eastern Railway
- Post-grouping: Southern Railway; Southern Region of British Railways

Key dates
- 1 October 1892: Station opened
- 12 June 1961: Station closed
Location

Horsmonden is a closed railway station on the closed Hawkhurst Branch in Kent, England.

== Background ==
The station was opened on 1 October 1892, when the line was opened from Paddock Wood to Hope Mill, for Goudhurst & Lamberhurst. The station was equipped with a single 300 ft platform on the up side, together with a loop serving a fruit packing warehouse. To the rear of the station are the stationmaster's house, a three-storey building with dormer windows, and a goods yard. The village of Horsmonden lies a short distance to the west of the station.

The station was closed with the line on 12 June 1961. The station is now used as a garage called "Old Station Garage" and the stationmaster's house is a private residence.

== Footnotes ==
| Preceding station | Disused railways | Following station |
|---|---|---|
| Paddock Wood | British Railways; Southern Region; Hawkhurst Branch | Goudhurst |
