= Cranbrook railway station (Kent) =

Disused railway station in Kent

Coordinates: 51.0831°N 0.5022°E

Cranbrook
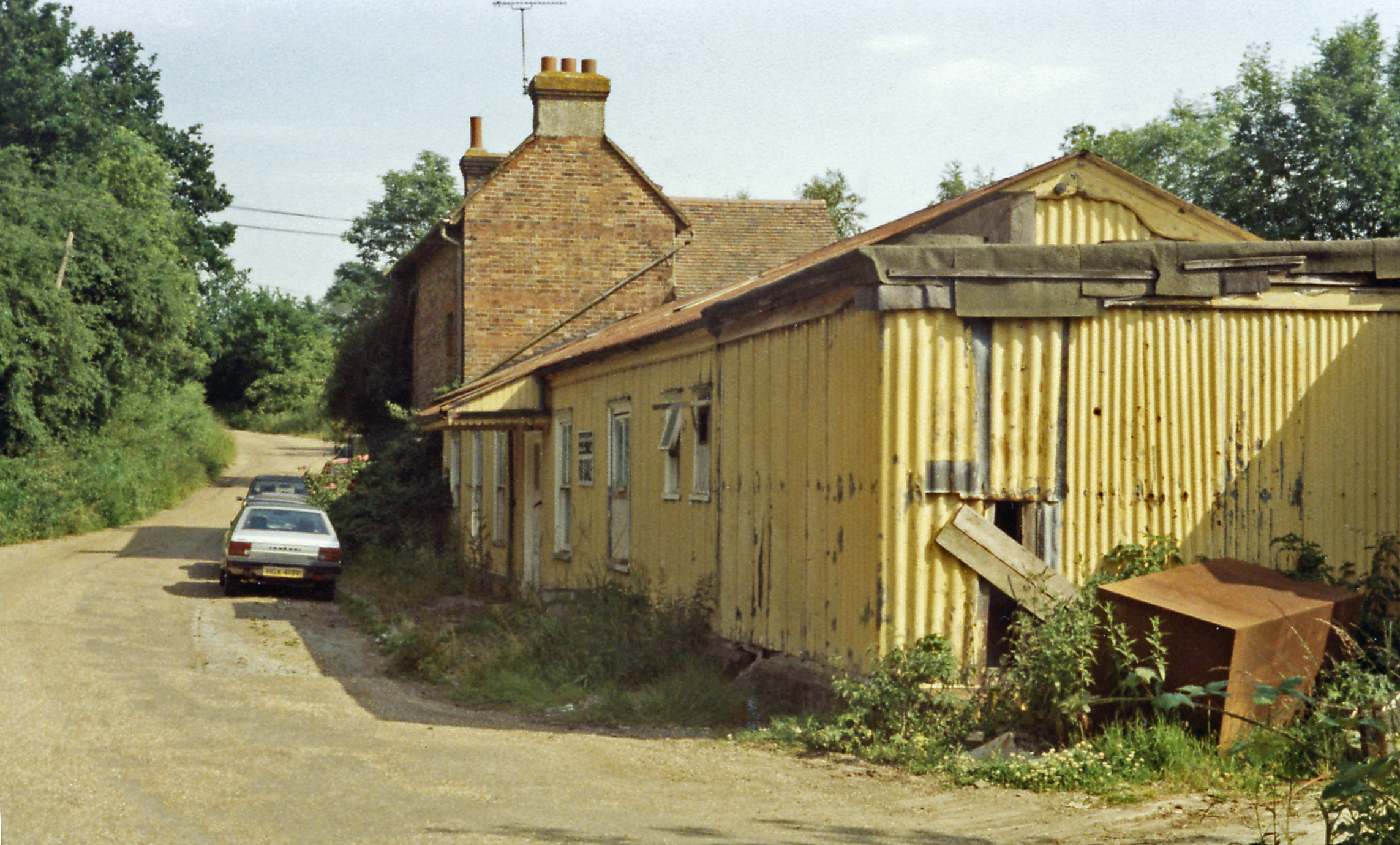
- Station buildings in 1984

General information
- Location: Hartley, Tunbridge Wells, Kent; England
- Grid reference: TQ753346
- Platforms: 1

Other information
- Status: Disused

History
- Original company: Cranbrook and Paddock Wood Railway
- Pre-grouping: South Eastern Railway
- Post-grouping: Southern Railway; Southern Region of British Railways

Key dates
- 4 September 1893: Station opened
- 12 June 1961: Station closed
Location

Cranbrook railway station is a disused English station which was on the closed Hawkhurst Branch in Kent, England.

== Background ==
The station was opened on 4 September 1893, when the line was extended from Goudhurst to Hawkhurst. The station was equipped with a single 300 ft (91 m) platform on the down side, together with a goods only loop. The stationmaster's house was situated on the platform, with a large goods yard and red brick goods shed to the rear. A warehouse used by a local corn merchant was at the Goudhurst end of the yard.

The station's name was a little deceptive in that the town of Cranbrook was two miles away. When the line was originally being constructed, local landowners had demanded high prices for the sale of their agricultural land and the South Eastern Railway had refused, amending the route of the line so that Cranbrook Station was actually located in Hartley. The villagers came to regret being excluded from the line, and an attempt was made to have a light railway constructed to Hartley. This was never realised.

The station was closed with the line on 12 June 1961. The station building was used for several years by Brian O'Donoghue and Keith Harding as "Cranbrook Station Pottery". This has now closed and it is reported that the station building is in poor condition, although the stationmaster's house is well preserved.

== Notes ==
Preceding station	Disused railways	Following station
Goudhurst	British Railways; Southern Region; Hawkhurst Branch	Hawkhurst
