= Horsmonden =

Village in Kent, England

Coordinates: 51.139°N 0.4288°E

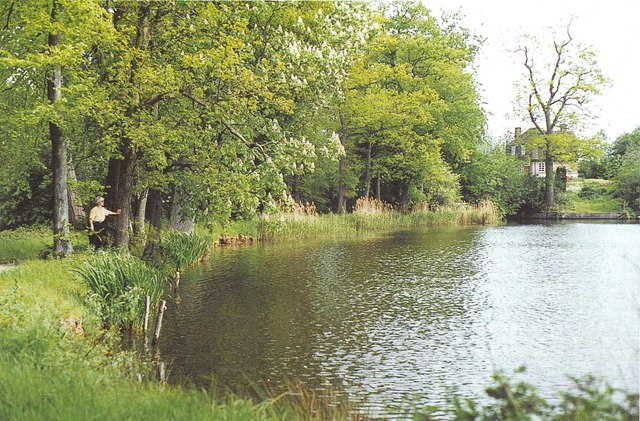
- Furnace Pond

- Location within Kent
- Population: 1,620; 2,435 (2011 Census)
- OS grid reference: TQ705405
- District: Tunbridge Wells
- Shire county: Kent
- Region: South East
- Country: England
- Sovereign state: United Kingdom
- Post town: Tonbridge
- Postcode district: TN12
- Dialling code: 01892
- Police: Kent
- Fire: Kent
- Ambulance: South East Coast
- UK Parliament: Tunbridge Wells

Horsmonden (/ˈhɔːrzmənˌdɛn/ HORZ-mən-DEN) is a village in the borough of Tunbridge Wells in Kent, England. The village is located in the Weald of Kent. It is situated on a road leading from Maidstone to Lamberhurst, three miles north of the latter place. The nearest railway station is Paddock Wood.

== History ==
The village's name is derived from the Anglo Saxon hors meaning 'horse', bune ('reed') or burna ('stream') and denn, a Kentish word meaning 'wooded pasture'. The village is first recorded as Horsbundenne around the turn of the twelfth century.

The village was an important centre of the post-medieval iron industry and the nearby Furnace Pond is one of the largest of the artificial lakes made to provide water power for the works. King Charles I visited the foundry in 1638 to watch a cannon being cast – a bronze four-pounder, forty-two inches long, now preserved in London's White Tower.

The village was home to Jane Austen's grandfather who lived at Broadford, a 15th-century clothmaster's hall, and several other of her relatives. The main Austen residence moved from Broadford to Capel Manor House which was constructed in 1860 but demolished in 1966. Many of the family's graves can be seen in the churchyard of St. Margaret's Church.

There is a Pavee horse fair held on the village green each year. In 2000, the local parish council with assistance of the then-Home Secretary Jack Straw, ruled that due to ongoing safety concerns, the fair would not go ahead and a 5-mile exclusion zone was put in place. However, due to protests and legal action from the wider Pavee community, this decision was overturned and the fairs resumed following a compromise between the travellers and the local authorities in 2001.

St Margaret's Church is located some distance away from the centre of the village, towards the neighbouring village of Goudhurst.

Just outside the village is the 16th-century National Trust property Sprivers, which has an open garden at specific dates as part of the National Gardens Scheme.

== Public transport ==
When the branch railway line to Hawkhurst was operating, there was a railway station for the village. However Horsmonden railway station closed in 1961. The station site is now used as a garage called "Old Station Garage" and the stationmaster's house is now a private residence.

Today the only public transport for Horsmonden is the 297 bus route previously operated by Renown, but now operated by Hams Travel and a 296 which goes to Tunbridge Wells from Paddock Wood operated by Arriva.

There are also two school bus services (the 268 and the 267) operated by Hams Travel.

== Cricket club ==
Horsmonden Cricket Club dates back to 1738. The team is first recorded in July 1738, playing against Chislehurst Cricket Club on Chislehurst Common. A return match took place at an unspecified venue in Horsmonden on Friday, 21 July 1738. The club retained prominence into the 1740s.

The club today is home to six cricket teams: two men's teams and four youth teams.

== Notable people ==
- John Browne (d 1651), gunfounder, leased Brenchley Furnace, the site of which is now in Horsmonden.
- Simon Willard, (d 1676), who founded the town of Concord, Massachusetts in Massachusetts Bay, was born in Horsmonden
- William Moon (1818–94), teacher and philanthropist, was born in Horsmonden
- Ruth Thomas (b 1967), novelist, was born in Horsmonden
- Ken Mills (ex-cricket player and supporter of Horsmonden Primary School)
- David Beerling FRS (born 1965). Director of the Leverhulme Centre for Climate change mitigation and Sorby Professor at the University of Sheffield. Educated at Horsmonden Primary School.
- Johnny Beerling (born 1937). British radio producer and station controller. Resided in Horsmonden.

== See also ==
- Listed buildings in Horsmonden
