= LCDR R1 class =

Class of steam locomotives

R1 class
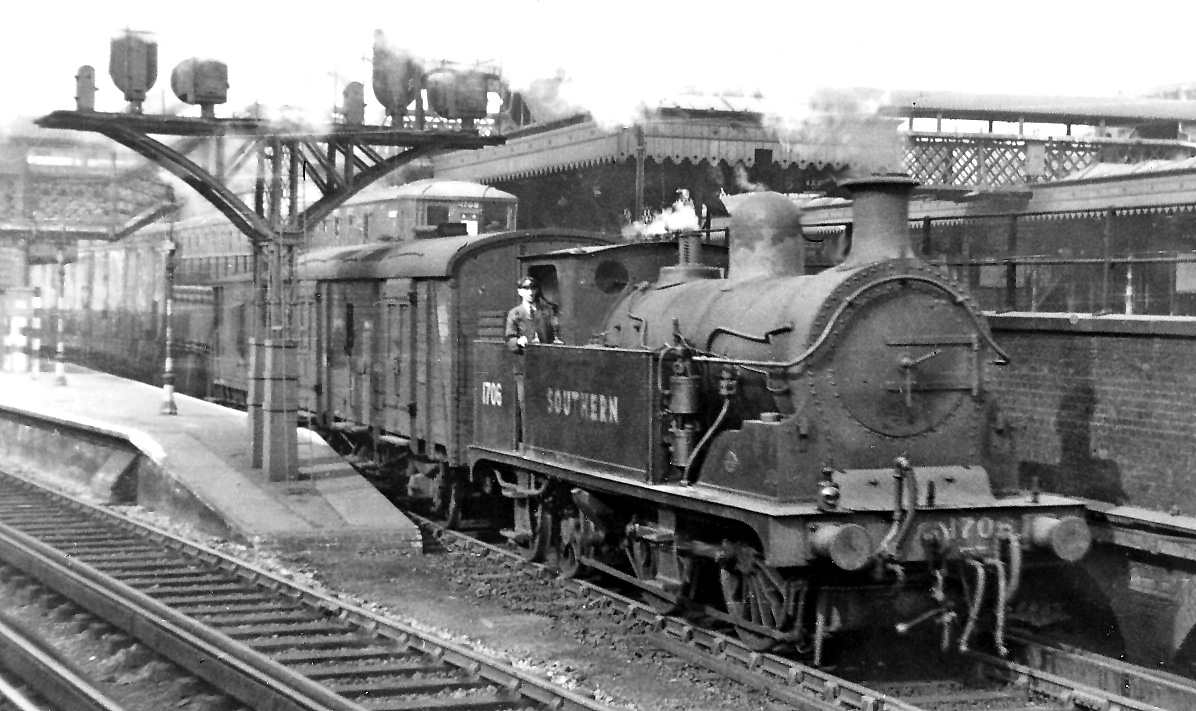
- No. 1706 at London Bridge, March 1948
Type and origin
- Power type: Steam
- Builder: Sharp, Stewart and Company
- Serial number: 4668–4682
- Build date: November–December 1900
- Total produced: 15
Specifications
- Configuration
  - Whyte: 0-4-4T
- Gauge: 4 ft 8 1/2 in (1,435 mm)
- Driver dia.: 5 ft 6 in (1.676 m)
- Trailing dia.: 3 ft 6 in (1.067 m)
- Wheelbase: 21 ft 10 in (6.65 m)
- Axle load: 16 long tons (16 t)
- Adhesive weight: 31.3 long tons (31.8 t)
- Loco weight: 51.45 long tons (52.28 t)
- Fuel type: Coal
- Fuel capacity: 2 long tons (2.0 t)
- Water cap.: 1,100 imp gal (5,000 L; 1,300 US gal)
- Firebox
  - Grate area: 16 1/4 sq ft (1.51 m^{2})
- Boiler pressure: 155 psi (1,070 kPa)
- Heating surface
  - Firebox: 99 sq ft (9.2 m^{2})
  - Tubes: 972 sq ft (90.3 m^{2})
  - Total surface: 1,071 sq ft (99.5 m^{2})
- Cylinders: Two, inside
- Cylinder size: 17 1/2 in × 24 in (444 mm × 610 mm)
- Train brakes: Vacuum & Westinghouse
Career
- Operators: South Eastern and Chatham Railway; → Southern Railway; → British Railways
- Class: R1
- Power class: BR: 1P
- Numbers: SE&CR: 696–710; SR: A696–A710 → 1696–1710; BR: 31696–31710
- Withdrawn: 1929, 1949–56
- Disposition: All scrapped

The LCDR R1 class was a class of 0-4-4T locomotives on the South Eastern and Chatham Railway (SECR), which were based on an existing London, Chatham and Dover Railway (LCDR) design.

== History ==
For many years, the two constituents of the South Eastern and Chatham Railway SECR - the London, Chatham and Dover Railway and the South Eastern Railway (SER) - had both favoured the 0-4-4T wheel arrangement for suburban and stopping passenger trains. The SER's most recent design was James Stirling's Q class 0-4-4T, which had been produced between 1881 and 1897, whereas the LCDR had the more modern R class 0-4-4T of William Kirtley's design, which dated from 1891. When more 0-4-4T engines were required soon after the formation of the SECR in 1899, the company had two options: to build more of either or both of the existing designs, or to produce a new design. It was intended that a range of standard designs would be produced which would be suitable for use across the whole SECR system, however until these were ready, it was decided to order more of the LCDR's existing R class design, but with modifications.

== Numbering ==
Fifteen of these locomotives were built by Sharp, Stewart and Company in 1900; their SECR numbers were 696–710 – nos. 696–705 were for use on the former LCDR routes, whilst nos. 706–710 were for the old SER system. Originally they were included in the R class, but were separated into a new R1 class in January 1901. No more were built, because by the time that further 0-4-4Ts were required, Wainwright's H class design was ready; it owed much to the R1 class.

Renumbering

The R1 class locos were renumbered three times: to A696-710 by the Southern Railway (SR) from 1923; to 1696-1710 by the SR from 1931; and to 31696-31710 by British Railways from 1948. The BR power classification, introduced in January 1949, was 1P.

== Withdrawal ==
Two (nos. A701 and A702) were withdrawn in 1929, and withdrawal of the rest occurred between 1949 and 1956.
