= Goudhurst railway station =

Disused railway station in Kent

Coordinates: 51.1093°N 0.4392°E

Goudhurst
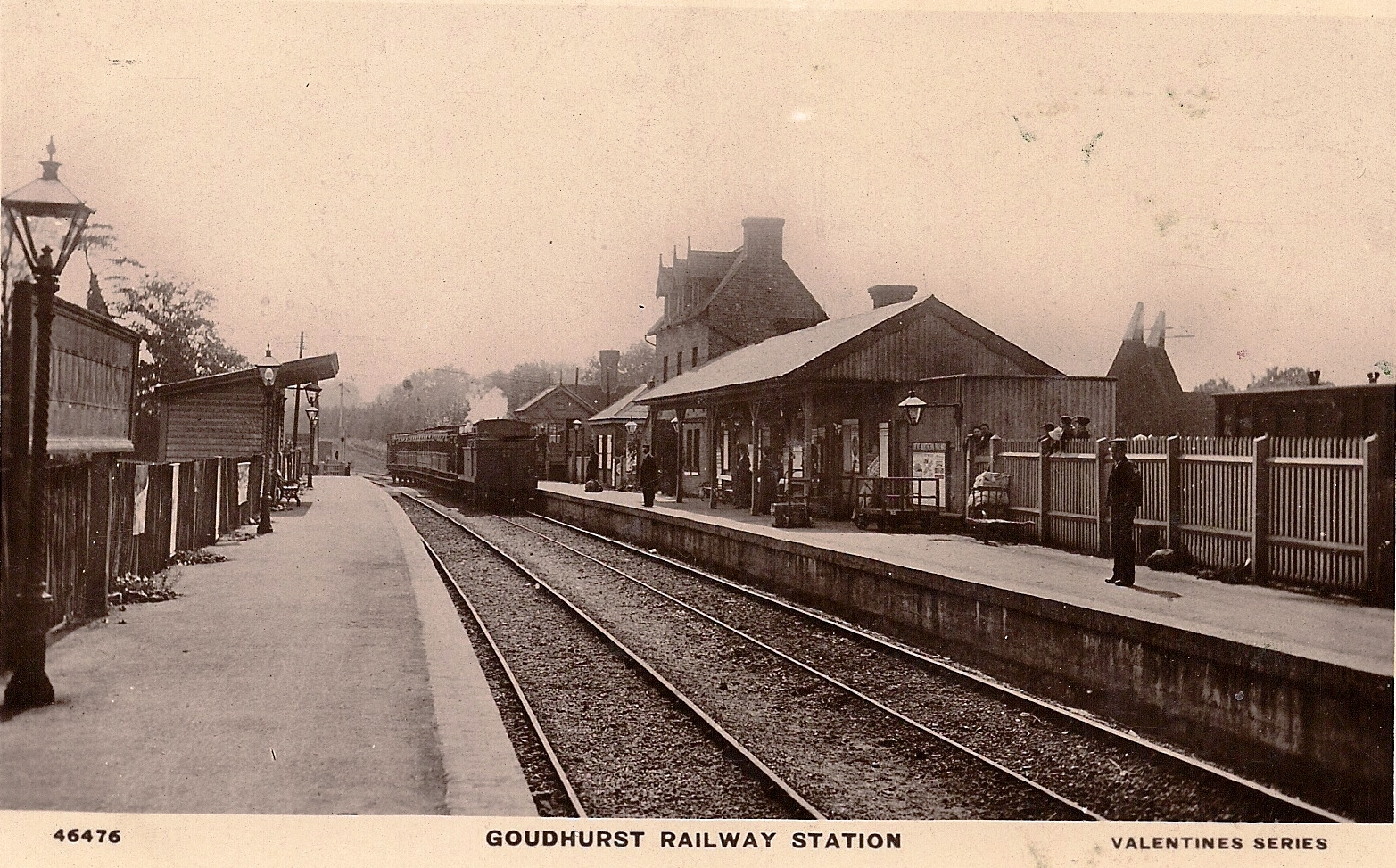
- A postcard view of Goudhurst station in the 1900s

General information
- Location: Goudhurst, Tunbridge Wells, Kent; England
- Grid reference: TQ709373
- Platforms: 2

Other information
- Status: Disused

History
- Original company: Cranbrook and Paddock Wood Railway
- Pre-grouping: South Eastern Railway
- Post-grouping: Southern Railway; Southern Region of British Railways

Key dates
- 1 October 1892: Station opened as Hope Mill for Goudhurst and Lamberhurst
- 1 December 1892: Renamed Goudhurst
- 12 June 1961: Station closed
Location

Goudhurst is a closed railway station on the closed Hawkhurst Branch in Kent, England.

== History ==
The station originally opened on 1 October 1892 as Hope Mill, for Goudhurst & Lamberhurst, when the line was opened from Paddock Wood. It was named after the parish, but following the presentation of a petition to the Cranbrook & Paddock Wood Railway Company in November 1892, the name was changed to Goudhurst on 1 December 1892. The station was the terminus of the line for just over eleven months, until the extension to Hawkhurst was opened on 4 September 1893. The station was approximately one mile to the west of the village of Goudhurst which was some 250 ft higher than the station, presenting a somewhat daunting task for a baggage-laden passenger. The station achieved some degree of fame when it appeared in the 1950s children's television series "The Old Pull and Push". It also featured in the 1953 children's film Adventures in the Hopfields.

The station was closed with the line on 12 June 1961. The fine station building was demolished in the 1960s and replaced with a private dwelling called "Haltwhistle" which is situated on the area where the goods yard would have been. The property is surrounded by high conifer trees and a swimming pool has been put in between part of the former platforms. The old station lights line the drive to the house.

== Accidents ==
On 18 February 1948, SECR C class 0-6-0 No. 1225 was wrongly despatched into the north sidings at Goudhurst and derailed.

Preceding station	Disused railways	Following station
Horsmonden	British Railways; Southern Region; Hawkhurst Branch	Cranbrook
