= Hawkhurst railway station =

Disused railway station in Kent

Coordinates: 51.0631°N 0.5058°E

Hawkhurst
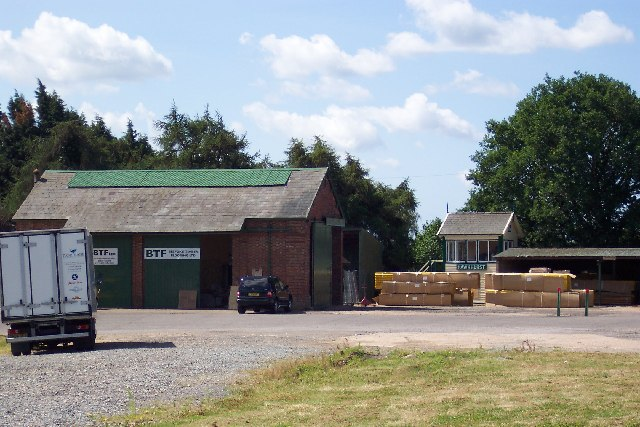
- The goods shed (left) and signalbox (right) at Hawkhurst Station

General information
- Location: Gills Green, Hawkhurst, Tunbridge Wells, Kent; England
- Grid reference: TQ757328
- Platforms: 2

Other information
- Status: Disused

History
- Original company: Cranbrook and Paddock Wood Railway
- Pre-grouping: South Eastern Railway
- Post-grouping: Southern Railway; Southern Region of British Railways

Key dates
- 4 September 1893: Station opened
- 12 June 1961: Station closed
Location

Hawkhurst railway station was on the closed Hawkhurst Branch in Kent, England.

== Background ==
The station was opened on 4 September 1893, when the line was extended from Goudhurst; Hawkhurst became the new terminus, and although there were plans to extend the line to Rye, these were never carried out. The station found itself in a slightly isolated and elevated position overlooking the Weald, approximately 1 1/4 miles (2.0 km) from Hawkhurst itself. It had a single 308-foot-long platform (94 m) situated on the down side, and a short 140-foot bay platform (43 m). The station was built as a through station, as it was proposed to extend the line to Tenterden but the extension was never built. The stationmaster's house is located to the south of the station as approached from the road. There was a two-road locomotive shed which opened at the same time as the station; it officially closed in 1931. The railway was used to send pot plants from Hawkhurst station; a million a year being reported.

The station was closed with the line on 12 June 1961. The site is now occupied by the Kent Woodware Company. The main station building was demolished in the mid-1960s. The engine shed, goods shed and signal box all survive in decent condition. The proprietor of the site has the signal box regularly repainted in Southern Railway colours and it retains its green and white "Hawkhurst" sign.

However, as of 14 January 2011, plans have been approved to build industrial units on the site.

== Notes ==
Preceding station	Disused railways	Following station
Cranbrook	British Railways; Southern Region; Hawkhurst Branch	Terminus
