= Hartley, Tunbridge Wells =

Coordinates: 51.084180°N 0.509690°E

Hartley
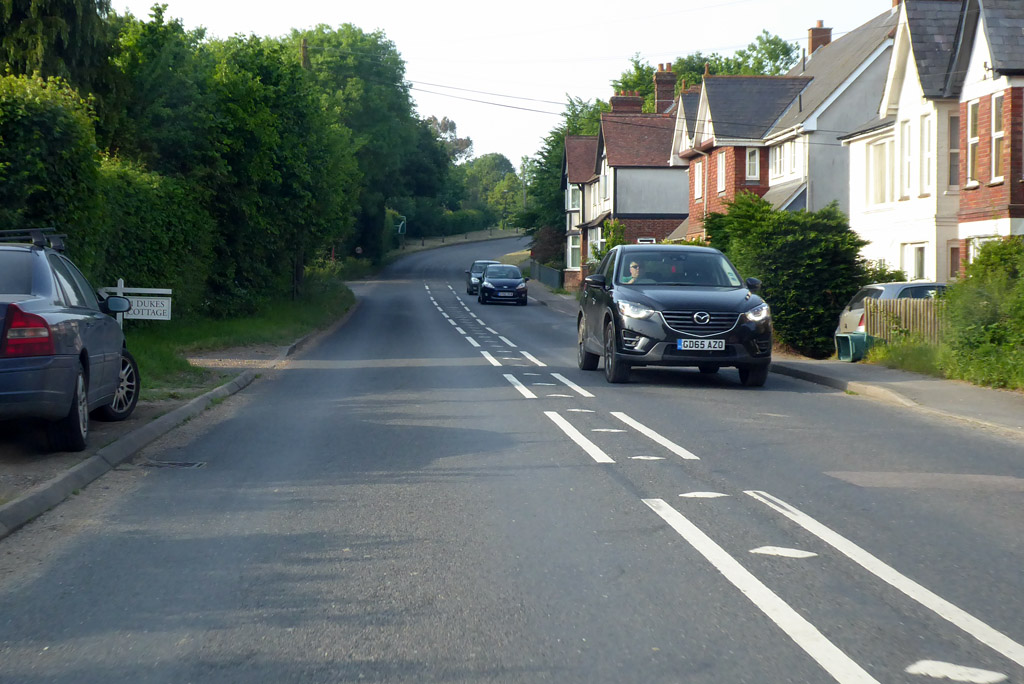
- Hawkhurst Road

- Location within Kent
- OS grid reference: TQ758346
- Civil parish: Cranbrook and Sissinghurst
- District: Tunbridge Wells
- Shire county: Kent
- Region: South East
- Country: England
- Sovereign state: United Kingdom
- Post town: Cranbrook
- Postcode district: TN17
- Police: Kent
- Fire: Kent
- Ambulance: South East Coast
- UK Parliament: Weald of Kent

Hartley is a village one mile southwest of Cranbrook, in the civil parish of Cranbrook and Sissinghurst, in the Tunbridge Wells district, in Kent, England. The only retailer in the area is a local farmshop, which has a cafe and fishmongers. Hartley lies on the A229.

Hartley Badgers are the local football team. Traditionally, only Hartley natives are eligible for selection.
