= SR N15X class =

Design of British 4-6-0 steam locomotives converted from 4-6-4 tank locomotives

SR N15X Remembrance class
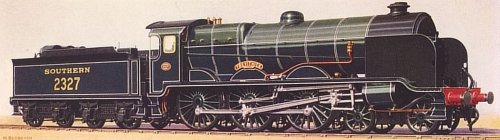
- A 1936 colour plate illustrating the general layout and livery of SR N15X number 2327 Trevithick from The Railway Magazine.
Type and origin
- Power type: Steam
- Designer: Richard Maunsell after L. B. Billinton
- Builder: LBSCR Brighton Works
- Build date: 1914, 1921–1922
- Total produced: 7
- Rebuilder: SR Eastleigh Works
- Rebuild date: 1934–1936
- Number rebuilt: 7
Specifications
- Configuration
  - Whyte: 4-6-0
  - UIC: 2′C h2
- Gauge: 4 ft 8 1/2 in (1,435 mm) standard gauge
- Leading dia.: 3 ft 1 in (0.940 m)
- Driver dia.: 6 ft 9 in (2.057 m)
- Length: 66 ft 5 3/4 in (20.26 m)
- Loco weight: 73.1 long tons (74.3 t; 81.9 short tons)
- Fuel type: Coal
- Fuel capacity: 5.0 long tons (5.1 t; 5.6 short tons)
- Water cap.: 4,000 imp gal (18,000 L; 4,800 US gal)
- Boiler pressure: 180 lbf/in^{2} (1.24 MPa)
- Cylinders: Two, outside
- Cylinder size: 21 in × 28 in (533 mm × 711 mm)
Performance figures
- Tractive effort: 23,325 lbf (103.75 kN)
Career
- Operators: Southern Railway →; British Railways
- Class: SR: N15X
- Power class: BR: 4P
- Numbers: SR: 2327–2333; BR: 32327–32333
- Locale: Southern Region
- Withdrawn: 1955–1957
- Disposition: All scrapped

The SR N15X class or Remembrance class were a design of British 4-6-0 steam locomotives converted in 1934 by Richard Maunsell of the Southern Railway from the large LB&SCR L class 4-6-4 tank locomotives that had become redundant on the London–Brighton line following electrification. It was hoped that further service could be obtained from these locomotives on the Southern's Western Section, sharing the duties of the N15 class locomotives. The locomotives were named after famous Victorian engineers except for Remembrance, which was the LBSCR's memorial locomotive for staff members who died in the First World War.

In their new form the locomotives were similar in outline to the N15 class, though suffered from the expectation amongst crews that they were an improved version of this type. Despite this, their ability to accelerate well was put to good use on cross-country trains between main lines. The class saw service into nationalisation in 1948. All had been withdrawn by 1957, with none preserved.

== Background ==
In the early 1930s, with the impending electrification of the Southern Railway's Central Section (the former LB&SCR lines), the question arose as to what to do with the relatively new and powerful LB&SCR designs. Maunsell looked at the possibility of converting the LB&SCR “Remembrance” or L class 4-6-4 tanks built by L. B. Billinton between 1914 and 1922. These Baltics had proved to be capable machines on the Brighton line, although their relatively low boiler pressure (170 psi or 1.17 MPa), the excessive difference between "first valve" and "second valve" on the regulator, and more particularly their small (8 in or 203 mm) piston valves in relation to their large (21 in or 533 mm) cylinders were a significant limitation, precluding their use on any other part of the Southern system. The limited coal and water capacity also limited their range, though adequate for the short runs on the Brighton line. The decision was taken to rebuild them into more conventional 4-6-0 tender locomotives.

== Conversion ==
All seven of the Billinton L Class locomotives entered Eastleigh works in 1934 for rebuilding, each leaving the works the same year. Conversion into the 4-6-0 tender type, entailed removing the trailing bogie, water tanks, and bunker, shortening the mainframes and fitting new cabs; these were of the side-window variety already used on the Lord Nelson class. At the same time there was a revision of the locomotives' front end arrangement incorporating a "King Arthur" N15 type of blast pipe and chimney; boiler pressure was increased to 180 psi (1.24 MPa), whilst the piston diameter was marginally decreased from 22 in (559 mm) to 21 in (533 mm).

The class received 5,000 imperial gallons (23,000 L; 6,000 US gal) bogie tenders from Robert Urie's S15 class and Southern-type smoke deflectors on either side of the smokebox. The result was classified N15X, the suffix corresponding to the old LBSCR designation for a rebuilt/modified locomotive. The conversion process created a locomotive that was similar in appearance to the N15 "King Arthur" class as modified by Maunsell in the 1920s.

=== Naming the locomotives ===
Two of the locomotives retained their original names: number 2333 Remembrance and 2329 Stephenson, whilst the other members of the L class, were newly named after famous railway engineers. The new locomotive names were suggested by Maunsell's assistant, Harry Holcroft, and were distributed as thus:

2327 Trevithick, 2328 Hackworth, 2329 Stephenson, 2330 Cudworth, 2331 Beattie, 2332 Stroudley, 2333 Remembrance

2333 Remembrance retained its name as it had been the LBSCR's designated memorial to employees lost in the First World War. However the original LBSCR nameplates were straight for water tank mounting, necessitating new rounded plates to fit over the central wheel splashers (see colour plate in infobox above).

== Operational details ==
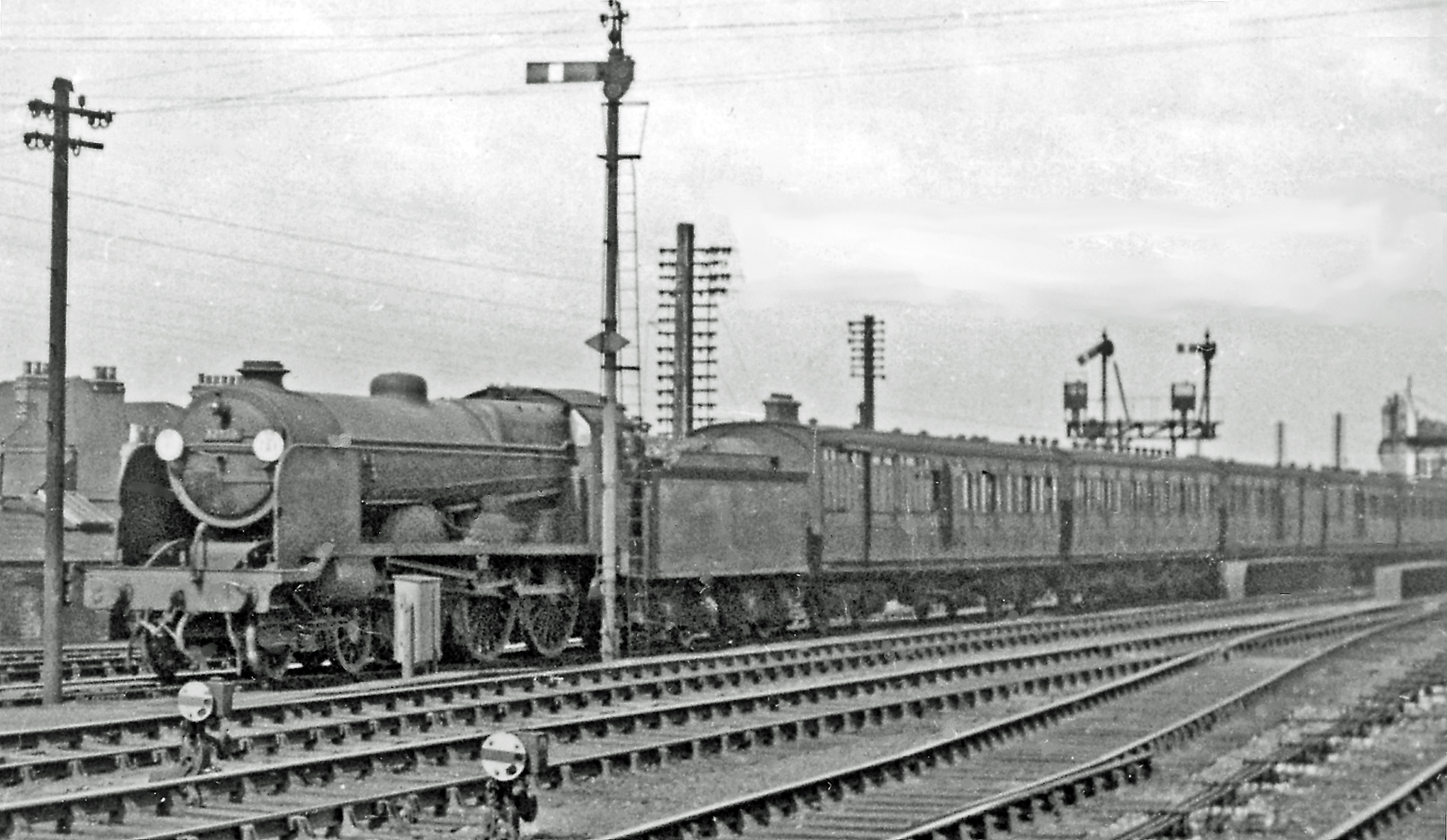
No. 32330 'Cudworth' entering Reading General 4 June 1949

The rebuilding caused a certain amount of controversy among footplate crews, with some maintaining that one could not make so many changes and have a reliable locomotive at the end of the process. The class suffered on the South Western section from the expectation that they were an improved version of the N15 "King Arthur" class. Once this misconception was overcome, the class came into their own on the Basingstoke services, where their ability to accelerate well was put to good use. However, the rebuilds gained a reputation for rough riding and relatively poor efficiency when compared to the N15s, and were dissimilar in performance to the original L class locomotives, making them unpopular with crews. Because of this, the class was used on secondary duties, cross-country and inter-regional trains around Basingstoke rather than the heavy London to Exeter expresses for which they were intended.

Several of the class were loaned to the Great Western Railway between 1942 and 1944 to assist in bolstering freight power, of which there was an acute shortage on that railway during the Second World War. The class saw use after nationalisation in 1948, but with increasing numbers of Bulleid Pacifics able to take over their duties the Remembrance class began to be withdrawn from service during the mid-1950s. Hackworth was the first to be withdrawn, in 1955, and finally Beattie in 1957. The early withdrawal of the class ensured that none were preserved.

== Accidents and incidents ==
- In 1940, No. 2328 Hackworth was at the Nine Elms shed when it and LSWR T14 No. 458 and four LSWR Class N15 express engines which included No. 751 Etarre, No. 755 The Red Knight, No. 775 Sir Agravaine, and No. 776 Sir Galagars suffered air raid damage. The T14 engine was scrapped while the other engines were eventually repaired.
- On 23 December 1955, locomotive No. 32327 Trevithick was hauling a passenger train that ran into the rear of another at Woking, Surrey. The locomotive was deemed beyond economic repair and was scrapped at Eastleigh Works, Hampshire.

== Livery and numbering ==
=== Southern ===
Under Southern ownership, the "Remembrances" were originally painted in Maunsell's Olive Green livery as seen above, with "Southern" and the locomotive's number on the tender tank. Wartime service under the Southern saw the locomotives painted in black livery with "Sunshine Yellow" lettering. Numbers allocated to the locomotives were 2327 to 2333. After the war, the locomotives were turned out in Bulleid's Southern Railway Malachite Green livery with "Sunshine Yellow" lettering.

=== British Railways ===
After nationalisation in 1948, the locomotives' initial livery was a slightly modified Southern Malachite Green livery, where "British Railways" replaced "Southern" in "Sunshine Yellow" lettering on the tender sides. From 1949, the class was turned out in British Railways mixed-traffic black livery with red and cream lining. The British Railways crest was placed on the tender water tank sides. Numbering was in the 32xxx series, as numbers 32327 to 32333.
