= LSWR T14 class =

Class of 10 four-cylinder locomotives

LSWR/SR T14
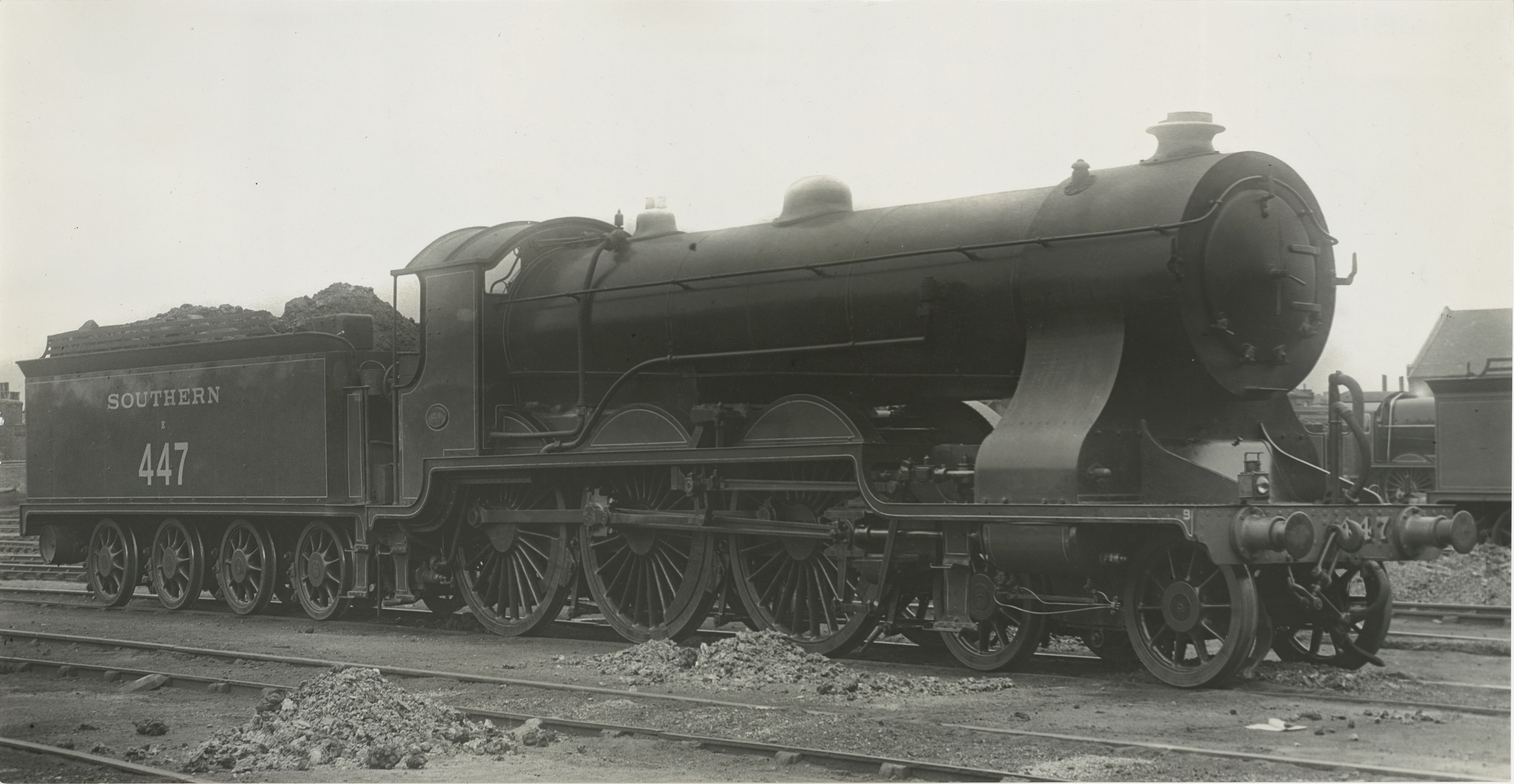
- LSWR T14 engine 447
Type and origin
- Power type: Steam
- Designer: Dugald Drummond
- Builder: LSWR Eastleigh Works
- Build date: 1911–12
- Total produced: 10
Specifications
- Configuration
  - Whyte: 4-6-0
- Gauge: 4 ft 8 1/2 in (1,435 mm)
- Leading dia.: 3 ft 7 in (1.092 m)
- Driver dia.: 6 ft 7 in (2.007 m)
- Length: 65 ft 6 1/4 in (19.97 m)
- Loco weight: 76.50 long tons (77.7 t)
- Fuel type: Coal
- Fuel capacity: 5 long tons (5.1 t)
- Water cap.: 5,800 imp gal (26,000 L; 7,000 US gal)
- Boiler pressure: 200 lbf/in^{2} (1.38 MPa) (saturated); 175 lbf/in^{2} (1.21 MPa) (superheated)
- Cylinders: Four
- Cylinder size: 15 in × 26 in (381 mm × 660 mm)
- Valve gear: Walschaerts
Performance figures
- Tractive effort: 25,177 lbf (111.99 kN) (saturated)
Career
- Operators: London and South Western Railway, Southern Railway, British Railways
- Class: LSW/SR/BR: T14
- Power class: LSWR/SR: B BR: 4P
- Nicknames: Paddleboxes or Paddleboats
- Locale: Southern Region
- Withdrawn: 1940, 1948–1951
- Disposition: All scrapped

The LSWR T14 class was a class of ten 4-6-0 locomotives designed by Dugald Drummond for express passenger use on the London and South Western Railway and constructed at Eastleigh in 1911–12.

== Background ==
Dugald Drummond's success with his previous 4-4-0 designs created a new problem. His new and robust designs allowed the timetables to be accelerated, and it soon became clear that passenger locomotives with greater power were needed. This was especially true when the LSWR's passenger requirements were increasing with lengthened, heavier rolling stock that needed to keep up with faster point-to-point schedules.

However, Drummond knew that this could only be achieved via the use of the 4-6-0 wheel arrangement and a multiple-cylinder layout. He had already introduced the F13, E14, G14 and P14 as new classes of 4-6-0, but they had all fallen significantly short of keeping pace with the increasing demands of traffic.

== Construction history ==
Despite his track record, Drummond decided to return to the 4-6-0 wheel arrangement. This was because such a design had been proven on other railways such as the Great Central, and the additional traction provided by an extra pair of driving wheels was useful in starting heavy trains. The resultant class T14 incorporated many features seen previously on his other 4-6-0 designs, the Drummond lipped chimney, large splashers. However, driving wheel diameter was increased from 6 ft 0 in (1.83 m) to 6 ft 7 in (2.01 m), and these were powered by four cylinders set in line in an arrangement similar to German practice in the first years of the 20th century. Divided drive was retained with the inside cylinders driving the front axle whilst the outside ones propelled the second axle.

Steam distribution was by two sets of Walschaerts valve gear on the outside, the motion of the inside valves being derived through rockers. Six locomotives (447 and 458–62) were fitted with Drummond's smokebox superheater, the other four used saturated steam.They were fitted with Drummond's patent cross water tubes in the firebox. These were later removed by R.W. Urie, who also fitted them with a conventional 'Eastleigh' smoke tube superheater with extended smokebox.

However, despite a definite improvement in performance over his previous 4-6-0 designs, the class was still plagued by heavy coal and water consumption combined with the serious mechanical problem of hot axle boxes, which had also afflicted all his previous 4-6-0s.

Year	Order	Quantity	LSWR numbers	Notes
1911	T14	5	443–447	
1912	B15	5	458–462	

=== Maunsell's modifications ===
Between 1930 and 1931, Richard Maunsell, who was adept at improving locomotives by redesigning and simplifying them, applied his principles to all members of the class. The infamous Drummond 'paddlebox' splashers over the driving wheels were removed to be replaced by a simple raised running plate. A further improvement was the installation of mechanical lubricators; this in tandem with the removal of the bulky "paddlebox" splashers went some way towards curing the problem of over-heated axle boxes. He also fitted his own superheater design, and reduced the boiler pressure to 175 psi (1,210 kPa). However, the locomotive still used large amounts of coal and water, resulting in an overall lack of any performance improvement.

=== Chimney modification ===
In 1940, number 447's chimney required replacing due to wear and oxidisation. No Drummond spares were available, resulting in the application of a short stove-pipe chimney. When outshopped and pressed into service, there was a marked improvement in its steaming ability due to the improved draughting. The same enhancement was subsequently applied to all but one of the class as they went through Eastleigh works for overhaul.

== Livery and numbering ==
=== LSWR and Southern ===
Livery under the LSWR was Drummond's LSWR Passenger Sage Green, with purple-brown edging and black and white lining. Under Southern Railway ownership from grouping in 1923, the locomotives were outshopped in Richard Maunsell's darker version of the LSWR Sage Green with yellow lettering on the tender, with black and white lining.

This livery was continued under Bulleid despite his experimentation with Malachite Green, though the 'Southern' lettering on the tender was changed to the 'Sunshine Yellow' style. During the Second World War, members of the class outshopped form overhaul were turned out in wartime black.

The class was numbered in two blocks by the LSWR. Numbering under the Southern retained the LSWR allocations.

=== Post-1948 (nationalisation) ===
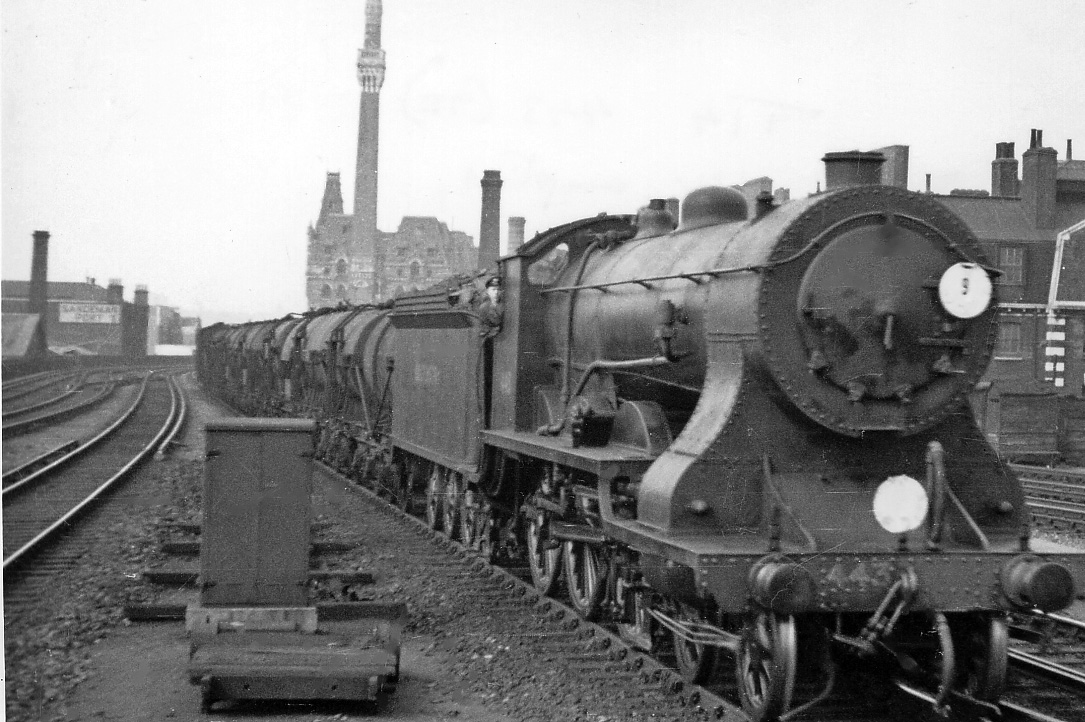
T14 No. 443 at Vauxhall 1948

Livery after Nationalisation was initially Southern livery with 'British Railways' on the tender, and an 'S' prefix on the number. The class was subsequently outshopped in BR Mixed Traffic Black with red and white lining, with the BR crest on the tender.

Locomotive numbering was per BR standard practice. Numbering was based upon the batches built. However, one of the locomotives had been withdrawn by the start of 1948, resulting in a gap in the sequence.

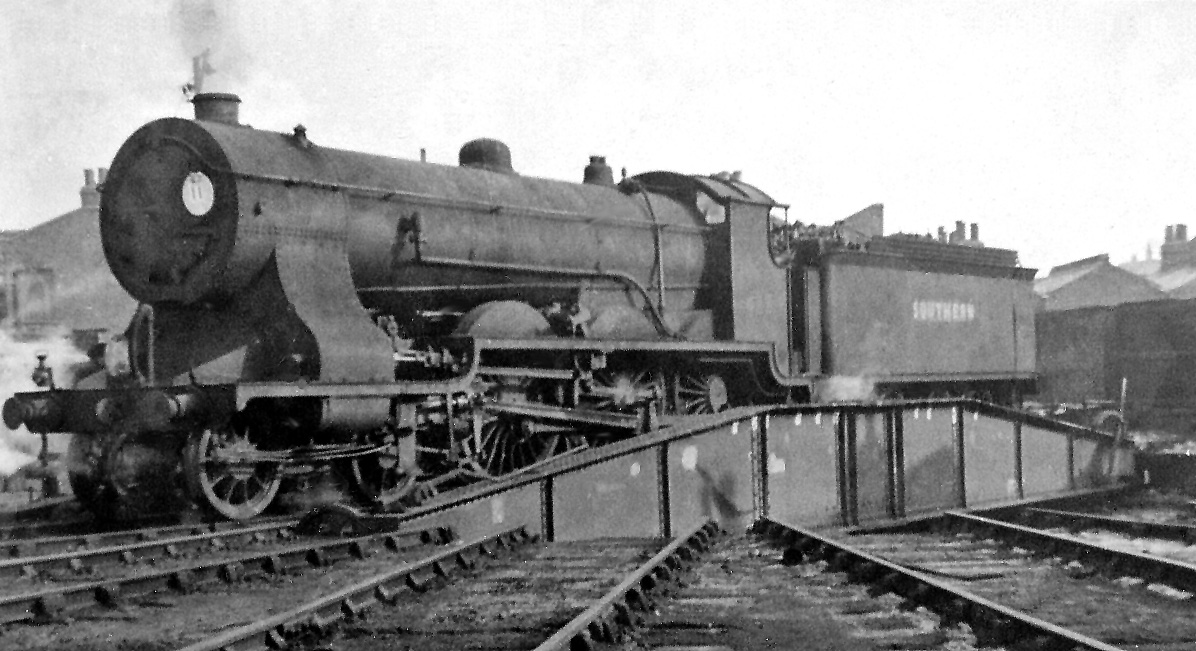
459 on the turntable at Nine Elms 1947

== Operational details ==
The T14's were the most successful of Drummond's otherwise failed 4-6-0 designs for the LSWR, though they still displayed the old, costly liabilities of heavy coal and water consumption on a railway that did not employ water troughs, which was combined with a high frequency of hot axle boxes. Both were issues with all his previous 4-6-0s and made them unpopular to locomotive crews.

In service, all were based at Nine Elms from new and were used exclusively on expresses to Bournemouth and Salisbury. However, the class struggled on these 'racing stretches.' This was especially true in the case of the tightly timed Salisbury workings. With intermediate stops at Surbiton and Woking, a D15 was the preferred motive power because they kept better time than a T14.

In consequence, they were utilised on the LSWR 'top link' for only 8 years, and were promptly replaced upon grouping in 1923 by Maunsell's N15s as they became available. However, their potential in secondary duties allowed Maunsell to attempt to fix the problems with the original design. Superheating helped to solve the problems of efficiency in terms of coal and water, whilst the removal of the splashers meant ease of access to the wheels and airflow to the axleboxes.

The first withdrawal took place in 1940 when 458 suffered air raid damage at Nine Elms shed. The rest continued into public ownership in 1948. However, the remainder continued to be withdrawn from November 1948, and the last one surviving until June 1951. As a result, none were preserved.

Table of withdrawals
Year	Quantity in service at start of year	Quantity withdrawn	Locomotive numbers	Notes
1940	10	1	458	Air raid damage
1948	9	3	445/459–460	
1949	6	2	30443/47	
1950	4	2	30444/62	
1951	2	2	30446/61	
