= LSWR P14 class =

Class of 5 four-cylinder 4-6-0 locomotives

LSWR/SR P14 class
Type and origin
- Power type: Steam
- Designer: Dugald Drummond
- Builder: LSWR Eastleigh Works
- Build date: 1910
- Total produced: 5
Specifications
- Configuration
  - Whyte: 4-6-0
- Gauge: 4 ft 8 1/2 in (1,435 mm)
- Leading dia.: 3 ft 7 in (1.092 m)
- Driver dia.: 6 ft 0 in (1.829 m)
- Loco weight: 74 long tons 13 cwt (167,200 lb or 75.8 t)
- Tender weight: 49 long tons 0 cwt (109,800 lb or 49.8 t)
- Fuel type: Coal
- Fuel capacity: 4 long tons (4.1 t; 4.5 short tons)
- Water cap.: 4,500 imp gal (20,000 L)
- Boiler pressure: 175 psi (1.21 MPa)
- Cylinders: 4
- Cylinder size: 15 in × 26 in (380 mm × 660 mm)
Performance figures
- Tractive effort: 24,172 lbf (107.52 kN)
Career
- Operators: London and South Western Railway, Southern Railway
- Class: P14
- Locale: Great Britain
- Retired: 1925
- Disposition: All "rebuilt" to N15

The LSWR P14 class was a class of 4-6-0 locomotive designed by Dugald Drummond for the London and South Western Railway.

== Background ==
The continued need to improve his first two 4-6-0 classes led Drummond to create another design. The LSWR's immediate traffic needs were covered by the relatively successful G14 design of 1908, though with only five locomotives in the class they were unable to cover all heavy boat train services. However the need for faster trains to the South Coast ports remained, and the G14s needed assistance from a new class of similar design. The G14's proven ability to pull trains at faster speeds and their larger power-to-weight ratio on other lines led Drummond to continue developing the concept.

== Construction history ==
On his penultimate 4-6-0 design, Drummond had to produce a locomotive that was capable of hauling increased traffic at speed. Once again, the possible advantages of the design presented themselves. A boiler rated to 175 psi (1,210 kPa) saturated steam pressure (similar to the other classes) was utilised, powerful enough for four cylinders and 6 ft (1.8 m) driving wheels. The new design was equipped with four sets of Walschaerts valve gear, therefore reducing the mechanical complexity of his previous designs and also gave a marginally lighter axle-loading. Large, single splashers covered the wheels, though these would prove troublesome in service. The Drummond 'watercart' eight-wheeled tender was utilised for the long journeys on the LSWR mainline.

Although ordered from Nine Elms Works in February 1909, they had stopped building new locomotives following the delivery of the final B4 class in 1908. After some delays, full-scale construction was transferred to Eastleigh Works, with the first of five P14s being outshopped in October 1910, more than two years after the completion of his G14 design. They were the first tender locomotives built at Eastleigh, being preceded by two S14 class tank locomotives.

Year	Order	Quantity	LSWR numbers	Notes
1910	P14	5	448–452	

=== Rebuilding under Maunsell ===
After 15 years in both primary and secondary passenger duties, Richard Maunsell, chief mechanical engineer of the newly formed Southern Railway in 1923, decided the class needed to be rebuilt to conform with the general standardization of Southern locomotives. The P14s were reduced to kits of parts that were used to build a further batch of N15 class locomotives. However, 0449 (renumbered to make way for the new N15) ran for several months as part of the development work for the Lord Nelsons, at the same time its alleged rebuild as the new N15 449 was in service.

== Livery and numbering ==
Under the LSWR, the P14s were outshopped in the LSWR Passenger Sage Green livery with purple-brown edging, creating panels of green. This was further lined in white and black with 'LSWR' in gilt on the tender tank sides.

When transferred to Southern Railway ownership after 1923, the locomotives were outshopped in Richard Maunsell's darker version of the LSWR livery. The LSWR standard gilt lettering was changed to yellow with 'Southern' on the water tank sides. The locomotives also featured black and white lining.

== Operational details ==
The P14 design had originally been intended to operate expresses between Salisbury and Exeter, replacing the failed F13 and E14 predecessors. They were considered to be more successful than these locomotives by their crews, and acted as supplements to their G14 class siblings on these duties. However, the class still had most of the drawbacks associated with Drummond 4-6-0s in terms of high water and coal consumption.

The P14s continued in their Drummond guise without modification until they were rebuilt in 1925 by Richard Maunsell, who used the parts to create a new batch of N15 locomotives. As a result, no examples survived into preservation.
