= LSWR D15 class =

LSWR/SR D15 class
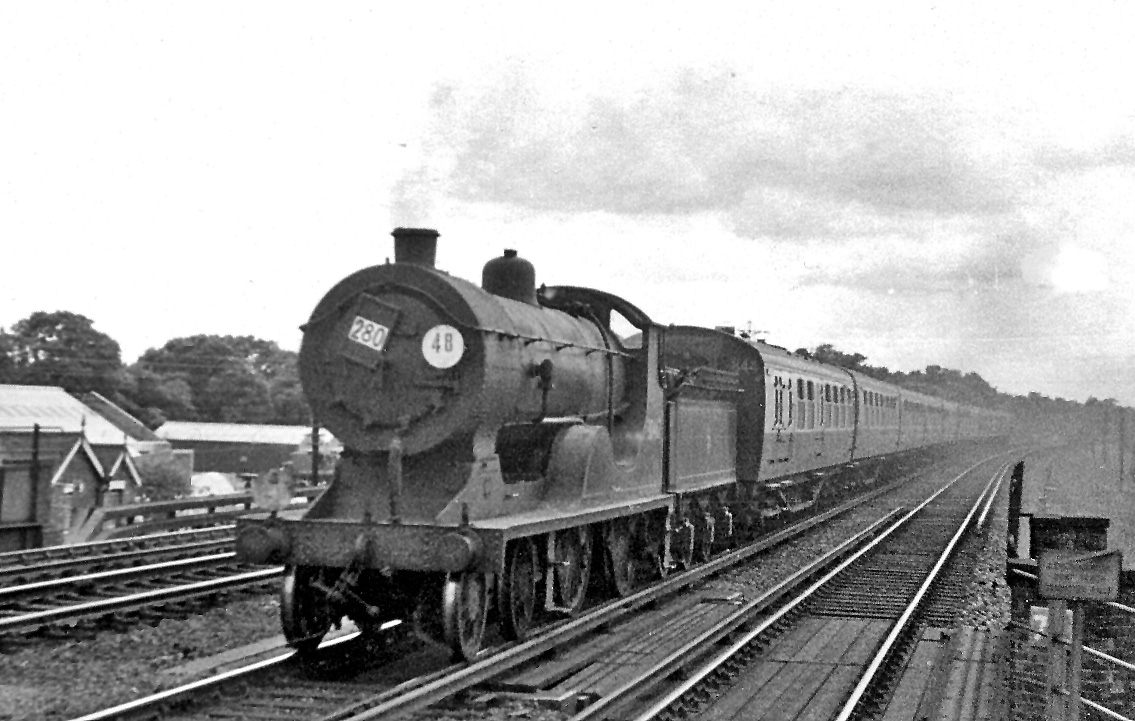
- D15 Nº 30467 heads a summer Saturday Lymington Pier to Waterloo express past West Weybridge station
Type and origin
- Power type: Steam
- Designer: Dugald Drummond
- Builder: LSWR Eastleigh Works
- Build date: 1912–13
- Total produced: 10
Specifications
- Configuration
  - Whyte: 4-4-0
  - UIC: 2'Bh
- Gauge: 4 ft 8 1/2 in (1,435 mm)
- Leading dia.: 3 ft 7 in (1.092 m)
- Driver dia.: 6 ft 7 in (2.007 m)
- Length: 63 ft 9 in (19.43 m)
- Loco weight: 59.75 long tons (60.71 t) (original); 61.55 long tons (62.54 t) (superheated)
- Tender weight: 49 long tons (50 t) (8-wheeled); 36.7 long tons (37.3 t) (6-wheeled)
- Fuel type: Coal
- Fuel capacity: 4 long tons (4.1 t)
- Water cap.: 4,500 imp gal (20,500 L) (8-wheeled tender); 3,500 imp gal (15,900 L) (6-wheeled tender)
- Boiler pressure: 200 lbf/in^{2} (1.38 MPa) (new); 180 lbf/in^{2} (1.24 MPa) (smoketube superheater versions)
- Superheater: Drummond smokebox type, later Eastleigh, later Maunsell
- Cylinders: Two, inside
- Cylinder size: New: 19 1/2 in × 26 in (495 mm × 660 mm) Rebuilt: 20 in × 26 in (508 mm × 660 mm)
- Valve gear: Walschaerts
Performance figures
- Tractive effort: 22,333 lbf (99.34 kN) (new), 20,100 lbf (89.41 kN) (rebuilt)
Career
- Operators: London and South Western Railway; Southern Railway; British Railways
- Class: LSWR/SR/BR: D15
- Power class: LSWR/SR: D BR: 3P
- Numbers: SR & LSWR: 463–472; BR: 30463–30472
- Locale: Great Britain
- Withdrawn: 1951–1956
- Disposition: All scrapped

The LSWR D15 class 4-4-0 was the last steam locomotive design by Dugald Drummond for the London and South Western Railway in 1912. By 1912, Dugald Drummond had built several classes of unsuccessful 4-6-0 express passenger locomotives. The result of these failures was that when he designed what was to be his last class in 1911, a new 4-4-0 design emerged from Eastleigh Works in February 1912, with what was to be the first of his D15 class.

== Technical details ==
=== Boiler ===
In line with the typical Drummond layout, the D15s had a short smokebox with wing plates. The boiler was based on that fitted to the 1905 rebuild of his first double-single, T7 class number 720 of 1897; and had a long firebox with a sloping grate. This resulted in the boiler being pitched higher than usual to allow clearance over the trailing axle.

=== Water feed ===
An exhaust steam feedwater heater was provided and the boiler fed by duplex pumps located on the frames, between the coupled wheels.

=== Tenders ===
The class was initially given the "intermediate" type of eight-wheel, double bogie tender with inside bogie frames carrying 4 long tons (4.1 t) of coal and 4,500 imp gal (20,000 L) of water, due to the lack of water troughs on the line. By 1923, the eight-wheeled tenders had been replaced by six-wheeled 3,500 imp gal (16,000 L) versions transferred from K10 and L11 locomotives.

=== Superheaters ===
After Drummond's death, Robert Urie, his successor, fitted the class with Eastleigh superheaters. These had a very small superheating surface so they were replaced by Maunsell superheaters, when Richard Maunsell was appointed Chief Mechanical Engineer of the Southern Railway after the grouping of 1923.

== Construction history ==
Year	Order	Quantity	LSWR numbers	Notes
1912	D15	5	463–467	
1912	G15	5	468–472	

== Operational details ==
Contrary to Drummond's previous 4-6-0 designs, the D15s performed exceptionally well and were put to work on trains to Bournemouth, where many drivers noted their superior operational characteristics when compared to the T14 class 4-6-0s. This was due to a marked reduction in coal, water and oil consumption, and easier maintenance. However, with the succession of Urie, no further D15s were constructed, as he preferred to concentrate on 4-6-0 designs.

These successful locomotives worked, in the main, out of Waterloo and for a period prior to electrification had a virtual monopoly of the Portsmouth expresses, until the Schools class were introduced. Until the advent of the Bulleid Light Pacifics, a D15 was usually to be found working the Brighton to Plymouth service. Number 468 differed from the rest of the class in that it had the safety valves mounted on the firebox, with Urie N15 style dome and safety valve casings, whilst the others had Drummond direct-loaded safety valves on their domes. As built, number 463 was fitted with a hooter rather than a whistle, which it kept until the Second World War. The class continued into British Railways service in 1948 but were gradually withdrawn in the early 1950s. This meant that none survived to be preserved.

== Accidents and incidents ==
- In August 1949, locomotive No. 467 was hauling a train which overran signals at St. Denys station, Hampshire and was derailed by trap points. The derailment caused a set of points to move, causing a boat train to be diverted. This avoided a more serious accident as No. 467 was foul of the line it should have been on.

== Livery and numbering ==
=== LSWR and Southern ===
Under the LSWR, the D15s were outshopped in the LSWR Passenger Sage Green livery with purple-brown edging, creating panels of green. This was further lined in white and black with 'LSWR' in gilt on the tender tank sides. They were numbered 463–472 in a continuous block.

When transferred to Southern Railway ownership after 1923, the locomotives carried Richard Maunsell's darker version of the LSWR livery. The LSWR standard gilt lettering was changed to yellow with 'Southern' on the water tank sides. The locomotives also featured black and white lining.

=== Post-1948 (nationalisation) ===
Livery after Nationalisation was initially Southern freight livery with 'British Railways' on the tender, and an 'S' prefix on the number. The class was subsequently outshopped in BR Mixed Traffic Black with red and white lining, with the BR crest on the tender. Locomotive numbering was per BR standard practice, with all 10 locomotives passing into British Railways ownership in 1948. BR numbers were 30463-30472.

Table of withdrawals
Year	Quantity in service at start of year	Quantity withdrawn	Locomotive numbers	Notes
1951	10	2	30463/69	
1952	8	4	30466/68/70/72	
1954	4	2	30464/71	
1955	2	1	30467	
1956	1	1	30465	
