= Eastleigh Works =

Railway workshops in Eastleigh, Hampshire, England

Coordinates: 50.96124°N 1.34742°W

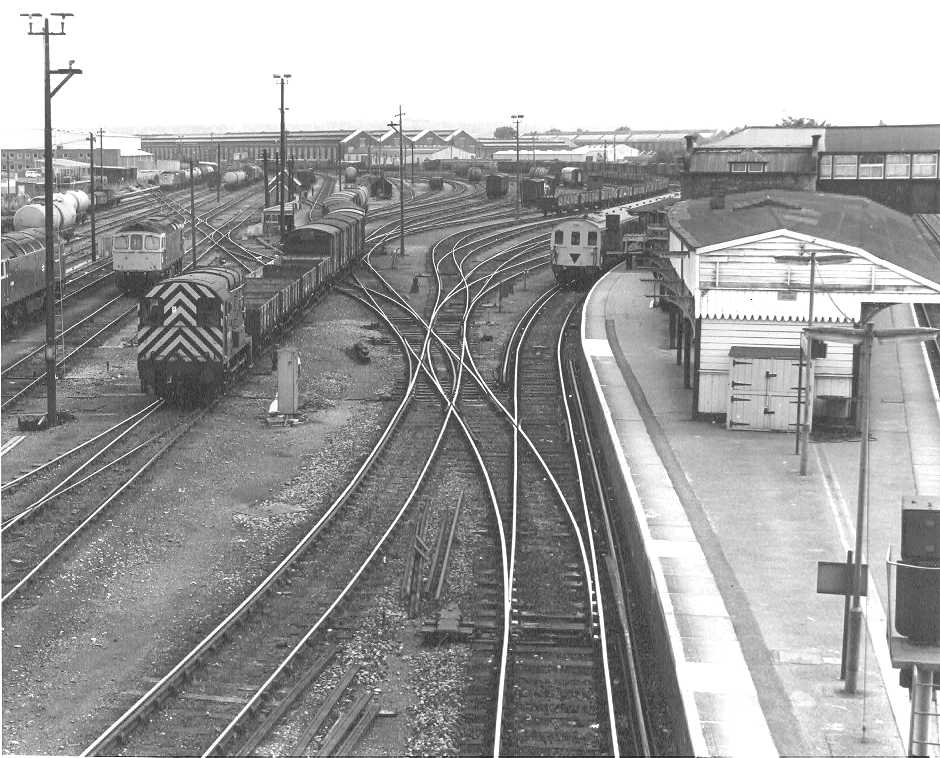
Eastleigh marshalling yard in 1984 with Eastleigh station to the right and Eastleigh Works in the background

Eastleigh Works is a locomotive, carriage and wagon building and repair facility in the town of Eastleigh, in the county of Hampshire in England.

== History ==
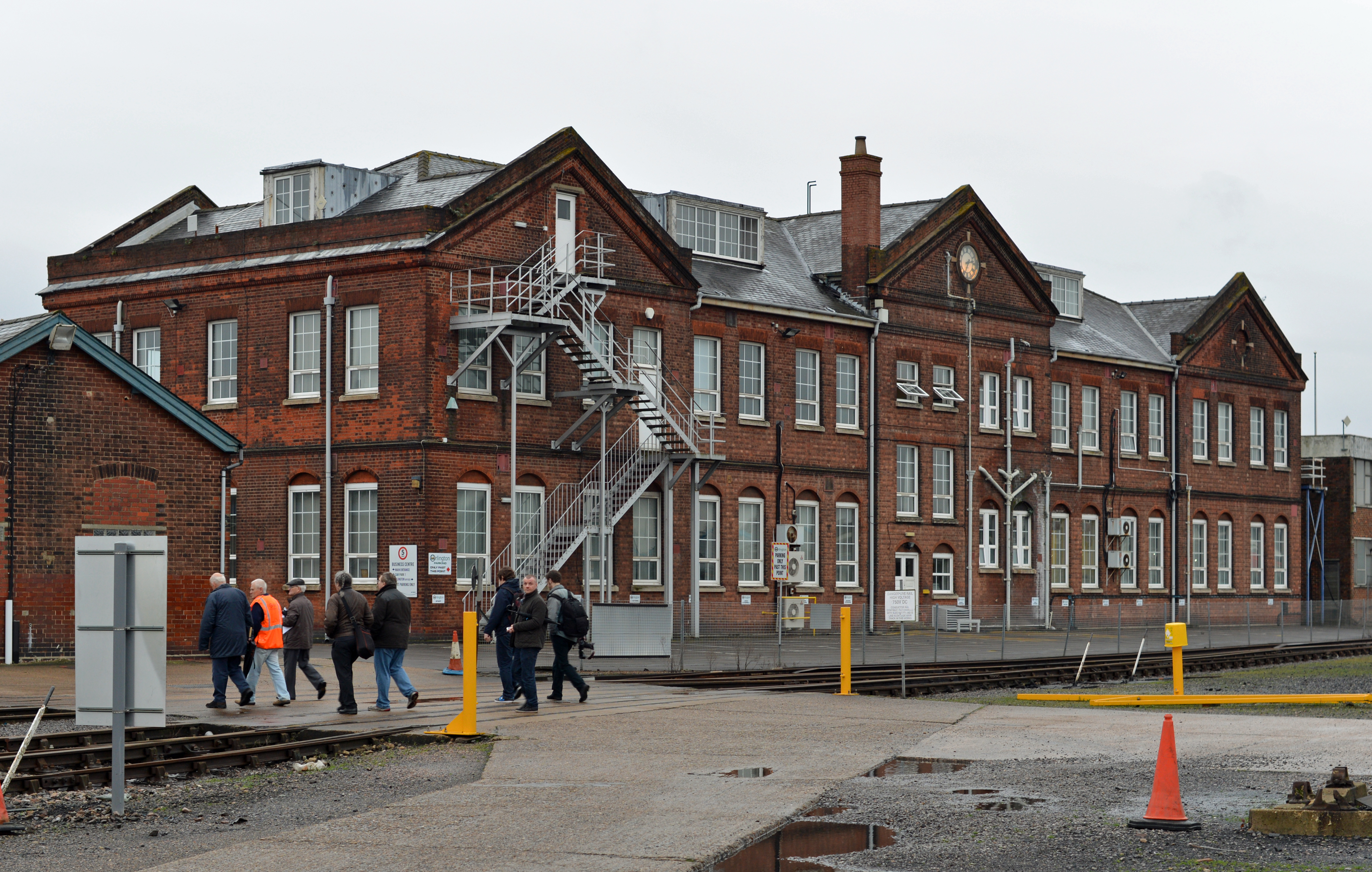
Eastleigh Works Management Building

=== LSWR ===
The London and South Western Railway (LSWR) opened a carriage and wagon works at Eastleigh in 1891. In 1903, the Chief Mechanical Engineer, Dugald Drummond, oversaw the construction of a large motive power depot in the town; replacing the existing maintenance and repair shops at Northam, Southampton. In January 1910, locomotive building was likewise transferred to the new workshops at Eastleigh from Nine Elms in London.

The first locomotives built at Eastleigh were the two S14 0-4-0T delivered in September 1910, and these were followed by Eastleigh's first tender locomotives, the five P14 4-6-0, delivered between October 1910 and February 1911.

Among the other locomotives produced by the LSWR under Drummond at Eastleigh, were the M7 0-4-4 tank engines, the T14 4-6-0, and D15 4-4-0, classes. Following the appointment of Robert Urie as Chief Mechanical Engineer in 1912, the works were responsible for the construction of the H15, S15, and N15 (King Arthur) 4-6-0 classes, and the G16 4-8-0, and H16 4-6-0 tank engines.

=== Southern Railway ===
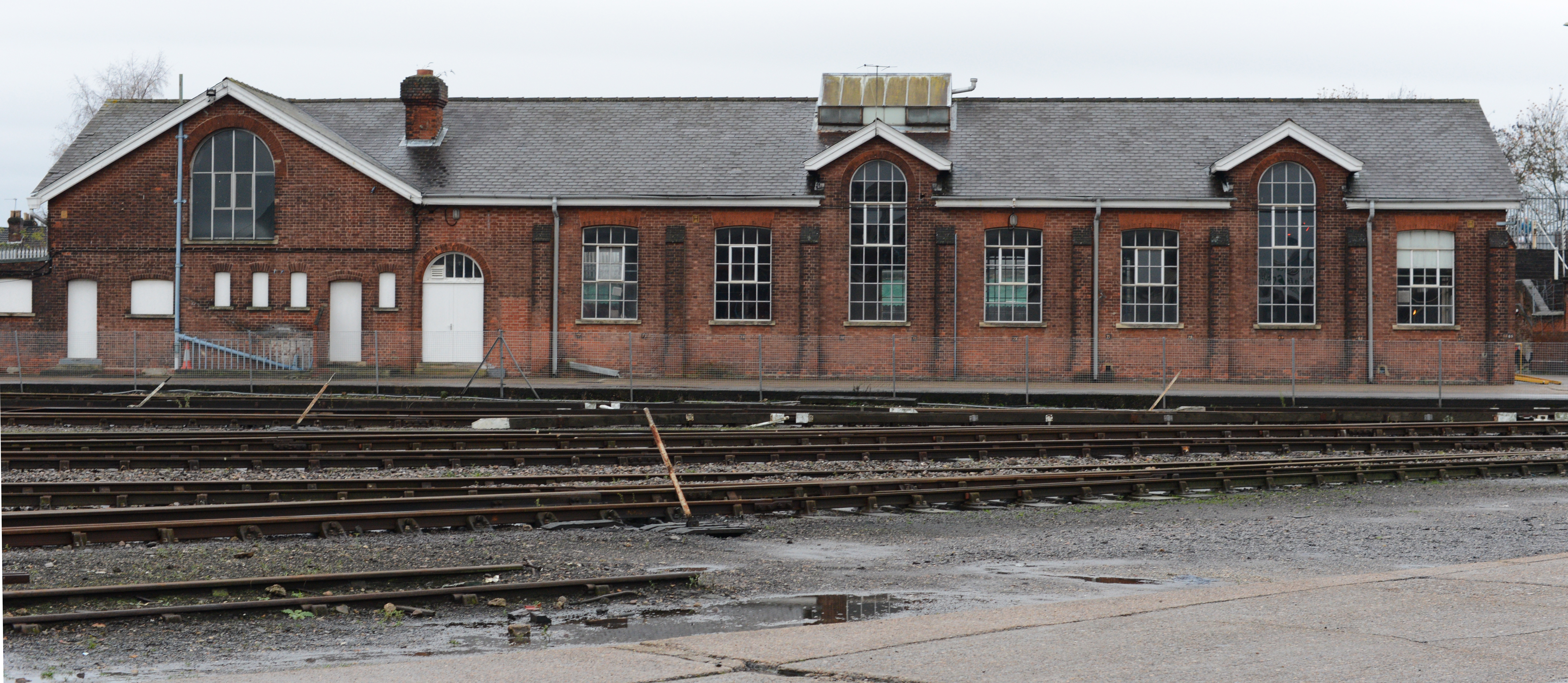
The old canteen shown from inside the works November 2014

Following the merger of the LSWR and other railways in southern England to form the Southern Railway, as part of the Railways Act grouping of 1923, Eastleigh was to become the principal works for the new railway. The new Chief Mechanical Engineer, Richard Maunsell re-organised the works and directed the design and construction of various new classes.

Like most of the railway works, Eastleigh was heavily involved in the war effort, producing, in 1938, sets of parts to convert Blenheim bombers so that they could be used as fighters. The works was also part of a joint venture with other workshops, railway and private, to produce Horsa gliders for the D-Day airborne assault. With Lancing works, it turned out 200 tail units. It also produced 1,500 anti-tank gun barrels and, with Brighton railway works, 240 multiple rocket launchers, plus landing craft, fuel tenders and harbour launches.

Under the Southern Railway, the works were responsible for building the Maunsell SR Lord Nelson Class 4-6-0, the Schools 4-4-0, U1 2-6-0, W class 2-6-4 tanks, and Q class 0-6-0 locomotives. Under the regime of Oliver Bulleid, after 1937, Eastleigh works constructed all thirty of the SR Merchant Navy Class and six of the West Country 4-6-2. During the Second World War, Eastleigh works built 23 examples of the London Midland and Scottish Railway designed 8F 2-8-0s. By the end of 1947, the works had built 304 locomotives with a further 16 before steam locomotive building ceased in 1950.

In 1945, the carriage works began constructing all-steel carriages, both electric and steam hauled. It pioneered the use of plastics and glass fibre reinforced resin for doors, seating and roof sections.

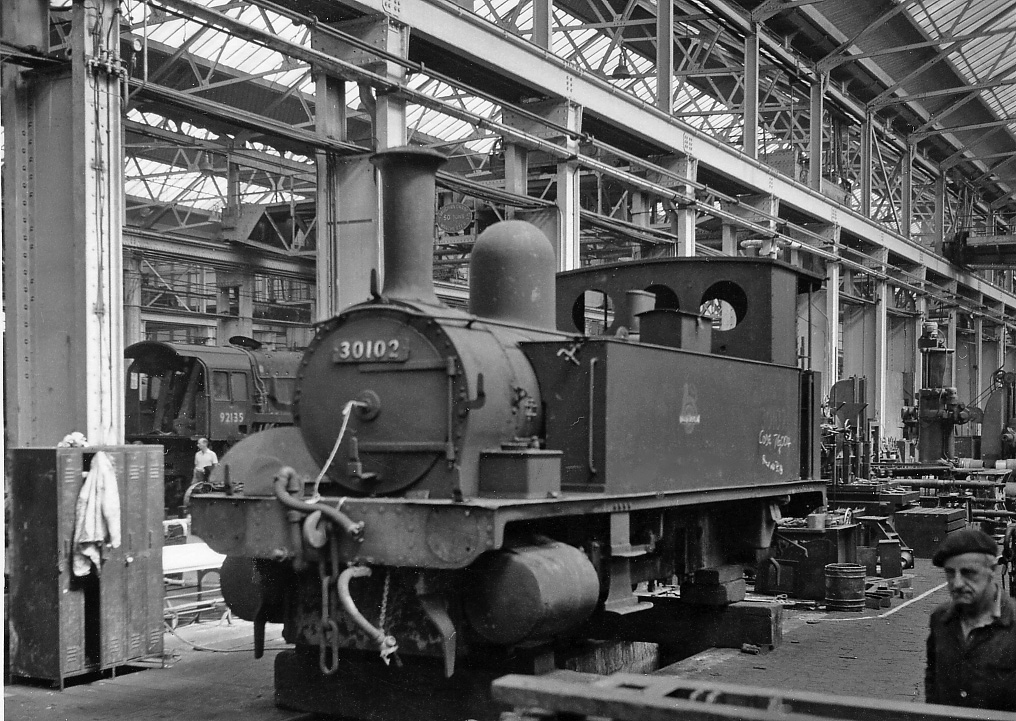
B4 0-4-0T 30102 at Eastleigh 1964

=== British Rail ===
In 1950, following the nationalisation of the Southern Railway to form the Southern Region of British Railways new steam locomotive building ceased at Eastleigh. However the works were kept fully occupied between 1956 and 1961 in rebuilding over 90 of the Bulleid 4-6-2 classes. Thereafter the works gradually changed over to steam and diesel repairs.

In 1962, the works was again reorganised with the carriage works site being sold, and carriage and electric multiple unit repairs transferred to the main locomotive works. In 1962, Eastleigh Works built the first six electro-diesel locomotives of British Rail Class 73 but the remainder of the class were built at the Vulcan Foundry.

List of locomotives built at Eastleigh
Order number	Class	Wheel arrangement	Quantity	Numbers	Years	Notes
P14	LSWR P14 class	4-6-0	5	448–452	1910–11	
S14	LSWR S14 class	0-4-0T	2	101, 147	1910	
T14	LSWR T14 class	4-6-0	5	443–447	1911	
X14	LSWR X14 class	0-4-4T	5	125–9	1911	
A15	LSWR X14 class	0-4-4T	5	131, 328, 479–481	1911	
B15	LSWR T14 class	4-6-0	5	458–462	1911–12	
D15	LSWR D15 class	4-4-0	5	463–7	1912	
G15	LSWR D15 class	4-4-0	5	468–72	1912	
H15	LSWR H15 class	4-6-0	5	486/7, 482/3/8	1914	
K15	LSWR H15 class	4-6-0	5	484/9/91, 485/90	1914	
M15	LSWR H15 class	4-6-0	1	335	1914	Renewal of E14 class
N15	LSWR N15 class	4-6-0	5	736–740	1918–19	
P15	LSWR N15 class	4-6-0	5	741–5	1919	
S15	LSWR S15 class	4-6-0	5	497–501	1920	
A16	LSWR S15 class	4-6-0	5	502–6	1920	
C16	LSWR S15 class	4-6-0	5	507–511	1920–21	
E16	LSWR S15 class	4-6-0	5	512–5, 496	1921	
G16	LSWR G16 class	4-8-0T	4	492–5	1921	
H16	LSWR H16 class	4-6-2T	5	516–520	1921–22	
L16	LSWR N15 class	4-6-0	5	746–750	1922	
N16	LSWR N15 class	4-6-0	5	751–5	1922–23	
R16	LSWR H15 class	4-6-0	5	473–7	1924	
T16	LSWR H15 class	4-6-0	5	478, 521–4	1924	
A17	LSWR H15 class	4-6-0	5	330–4	1924–25	Renewals of F13 class
	LSWR N15 class	4-6-0	10	448–457	1925	Renewals of P14 and G14 classes
	LSWR N15 class	4-6-0	14	793–806	1926–27	
	SR Lord Nelson class	4-6-0	1	850	1926	
	LSWR S15 class	4-6-0	10	823–832	1927	
	LSWR S15 class	4-6-0	5	833–7	1927–28	
	SR Lord Nelson class	4-6-0	10	851–860	1928–29	
	SR Lord Nelson class	4-6-0	5	861–5	1929	
	SR V class	4-4-0	10	900–9	1930	
	SR U1 class	2-6-0	10	A891–A900	1931	
	SR U1 class	2-6-0	10	1901–10	1931	
	SR W class	2-6-4T	5	1911–5	1932	
	SR V class	4-4-0	20	910–929	1932–34	
	SR V class	4-4-0	10	930–9	1934–35	
	LSWR S15 class	4-6-0	10	838–847	1936	
	SR Q class	0-6-0	20	530–549	1938–39	
	SR Merchant Navy class	4-6-2	10	21C1–21C10	1941–42	
	LMS Stanier Class 8F	2-8-0	10	8600–9 (LMS)	1943	Ordered by Railway Executive Committee for the LMS
	LMS Stanier Class 8F	2-8-0	13	8650–62 (LMS)	1943–44	Ordered by Railway Executive Committee for the LMS
	SR Merchant Navy class	4-6-2	10	21C11–21C20	1944–45	
	SR Merchant Navy class	4-6-2	10	35021–30	1948–49	
	SR West Country class	4-6-2	6	34095/7/9/101/2/4	1949–50	Order transferred from Brighton Works, which built the other 14 in the series 34091–110.
	British Rail Class 73	Bo-Bo	6	E6001–6	1962	Electro-diesel locomotives

=== Post privatisation ===
As part of the privatisation of British Rail, the plant was acquired from British Rail Engineering Limited through a management buyout in June 1995 and rebranded Wessex Traincare. In 1998 it was sold to Alstom and renamed Alstom Wessex Traincare. The site was used for carriage and multiple unit repairs. In 2004, Alstom announced the works were to close due to lack of work, which took effect in March 2006 after the completion of a contract to refurbish Class 455s for Southern.

The 42-acre (17 ha) site has been managed since 2002 by St. Modwen Properties; with the site being lease to several sub tenants including Knights Rail Services and Arlington Fleet Services. As of 2010, the site's facilities include overhead cranes, third rail electricity supply, paint facility, and refuelling facility. Additionally Siemens undertook maintenance of its South West Trains Class 444 and Class 450s on site, and Network Rail MPVs were stored on site.

In January 2018 KPI Property Investments who are jointly owned by St Modwen Properties and Salhia Real Estate sold the works to the corporate pension fund clients of Savills in a £20 million deal.

==== Knights Rail Services ====
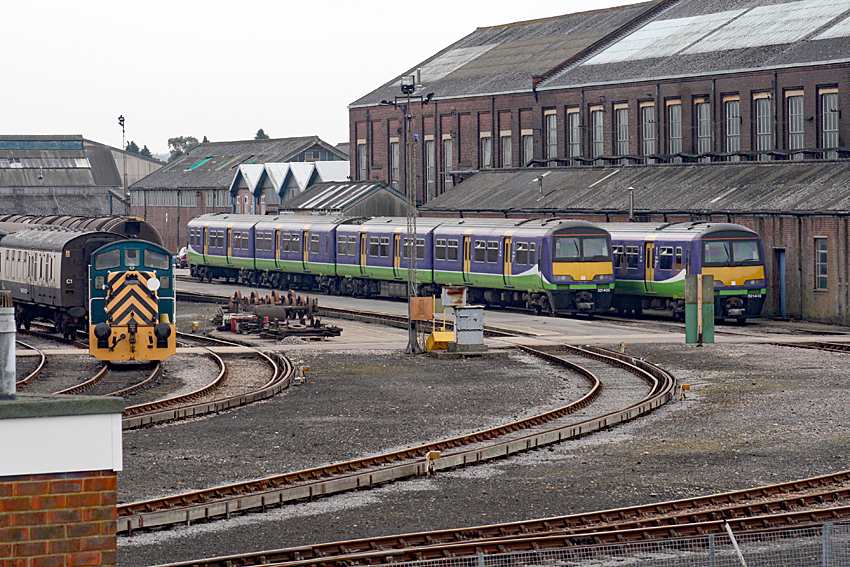
Eastleigh railway works in 2010

In 2007 Knights Rail Services (KRS) began operations on site, using it to store off lease rolling stock, as well as undertake repairs and refurbishments. It removed asbestos from withdrawn London Underground A60, A62 and 1967 stock. In January 2012, KRS signed an extended lease on the site to 2016. In September 2012, KRS was purchased by co-tenant Arlington Rail Services.

==== Arlington Fleet Group ====
Arlington Fleet Group is based at the site with and is composed of Arlington Rail Services providing storage facilities, Arlington Fleet Services providing repair and maintenance of railway rolling stock and Arlington Fleet Workshops providing paint shop facilities. It started in 2004 when Arlington Fleet Services Ltd was established by a group of railway engineering professionals to perform rail vehicle maintenance including heavy repair. In September 2012 Arlington took control of the work and various activities from KRS, becoming the dominant site tenant. By 2014 the works was again nearly fully occupied and Arlington extended its lease of the works until 2019.

== Locomotive Depot ==
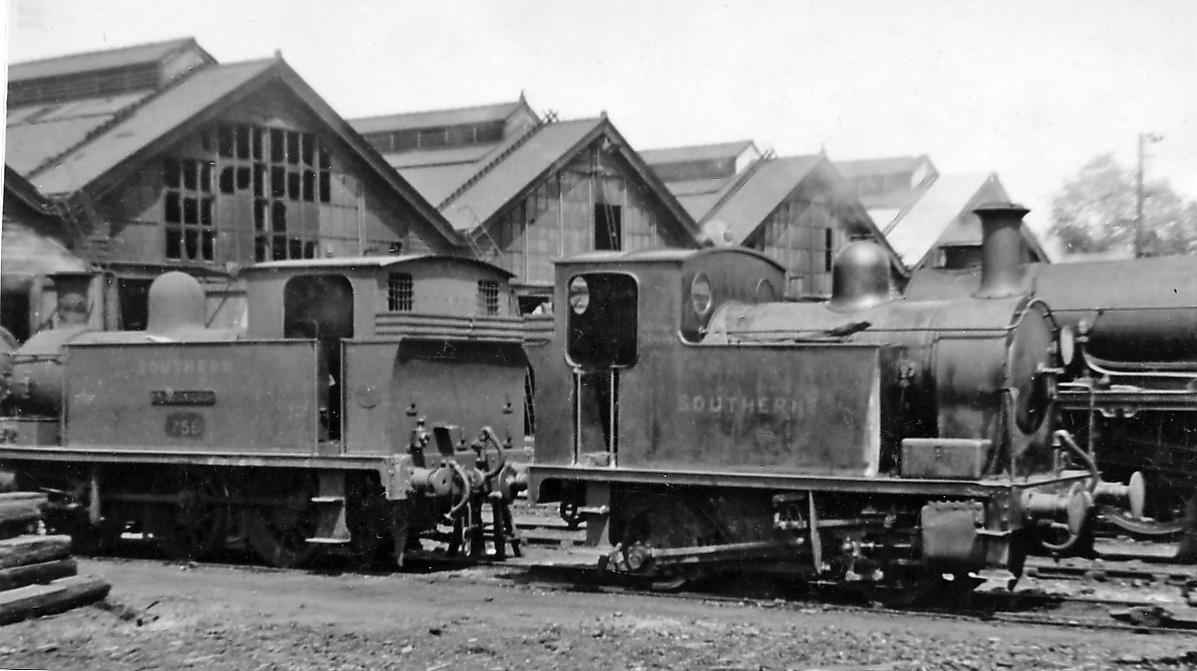
Eastleigh Locomotive Depot showing ex-Plymouth, Devonport & SW Junction 0-6-0T No. 756 'A.S. Harris' and C14 class 0-4-0T No. 3744 11 July 1946.

Adjacent to the locomotive works was a very large 15-road engine shed which was opened in 1903 and closed in 1967. This depot was one of the largest on the SR: in 1946 its allocation was 131 engines of extraordinary variety in age and origin:- 17 4-6-0, 31 4-4-0, 7 2-6-0, 19 0-6-0, 15 0-4-2, 1 0-8-0T, 13 0-6-0T, 23 0-4-4T and 5 0-4-0T. Although closed as a TMD, the site was used for scrapping engines as late as 2003.
