= SR N15 class 777 Sir Lamiel =

Steam locomotive built for the Southern Railway

SR 777 Sir Lamiel
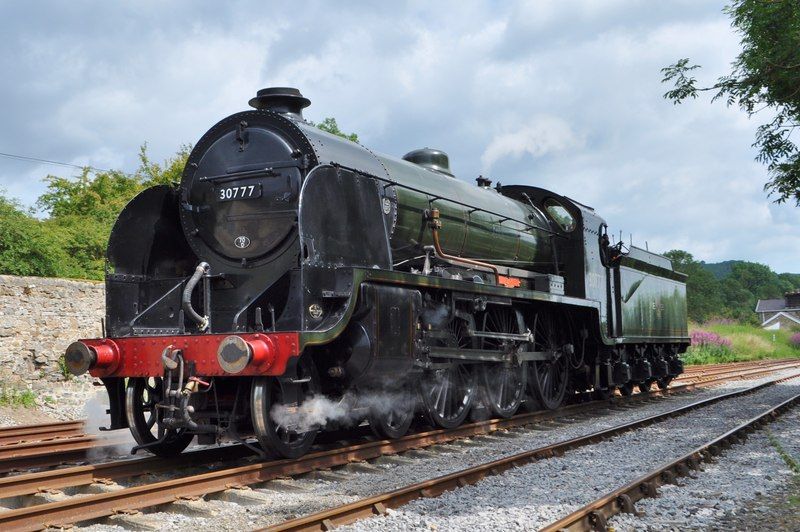
- 777 Sir Lamiel near Redmire, 30 July 2011
Type and origin
- Power type: Steam
- Designer: Robert Urie / Richard Maunsell
- Builder: North British Locomotive Company
- Serial number: 23223
- Build date: June 1925
Specifications
- Configuration
  - Whyte: 4-6-0
  - UIC: 2′C h2
- Gauge: 4 ft 8 1/2 in (1,435 mm)
- Leading dia.: 3 feet 1 inch (0.940 m)
- Driver dia.: 6 feet 7 inches (2.007 m)
- Length: 66 feet 5 3/4 inches (20.263 m)
- Loco weight: 80 long tons 19 cwt (181,300 lb or 82.2 t)
- Fuel type: Coal
- Boiler pressure: 200 psi (1.38 MPa)
- Cylinders: Two, outside
- Cylinder size: 20 1/2 in × 28 in (520 mm × 710 mm)
Performance figures
- Tractive effort: 25,320 lbf (112.63 kN)
Career
- Operators: Southern Railway, British Railways
- Class: LSWR: N15; SR / BR: N15 King Arthur
- Power class: LSWR / SR: A; BR: 5P
- Locale: Southern Region
- Withdrawn: October 1961
- Current owner: National Collection
- Disposition: Under overhaul

Southern Railway 777 Sir Lamiel is an N15 "King Arthur" class 4-6-0 steam locomotive built for the Southern Railway by the North British Locomotive Company in June 1925, and withdrawn from service in October 1961. The locomotive is named after a fictional minor Knight of the Round Table named Sir Lamiel of Cardiff. Lamiel is mentioned in Book XIX of Thomas Malory's Le Morte d'Arthur, where it is said he was "a great lover". No. 30453 King Arthur was first selected for preservation, but the lack of a Drummond water cart tender led to it being scrapped, and No. 30777 Sir Lamiel was selected for preservation instead.

Sir Lamiel is preserved as part of the National Collection, under the care of the 5305 Locomotive Association, and has been based at the Great Central Railway in Loughborough since 1996.

Until 2017, the locomotive ran regular passenger services on the preserved section of the Great Central Railway, where it is based. It appeared in the ITV crime drama series Agatha Christie's Poirot (as a Great Western Railway engine) in two episodes of the third series: "The Plymouth Express" and "The Double Clue", both broadcast in 1991. It featured in the 1995 BBC Television play Cruel Train, an adaptation of Émile Zola's novel La Bête Humaine which tells the tale of a murderous engine driver.

Following repair work at Tyseley and Loughborough, Sir Lamiel emerged in October 2012 in Southern Railway malachite green livery as 777 for the first time (having previously carried Southern Railway olive green as 777 and British Railways Brunswick green as 30777 in preservation) and at the 2012 GCR Autumn Steam Gala, it ran and at some stages double headed with fellow Maunsell and malachite engine SR V Schools class 925 Cheltenham. The locomotive continued to operate until 2017 when it was withdrawn from service, requiring another ten-yearly overhaul. Following several years of storage at Loughborough, plans to return the locomotive to service were announced in July 2020 with it scheduled to return to service in 2023. In February 2022, a delayed return to service was announced with the new target of 2025.
