= LSWR C14 class =

Class of railmotor steam locomotives

LSWR C14 & S14 Classes
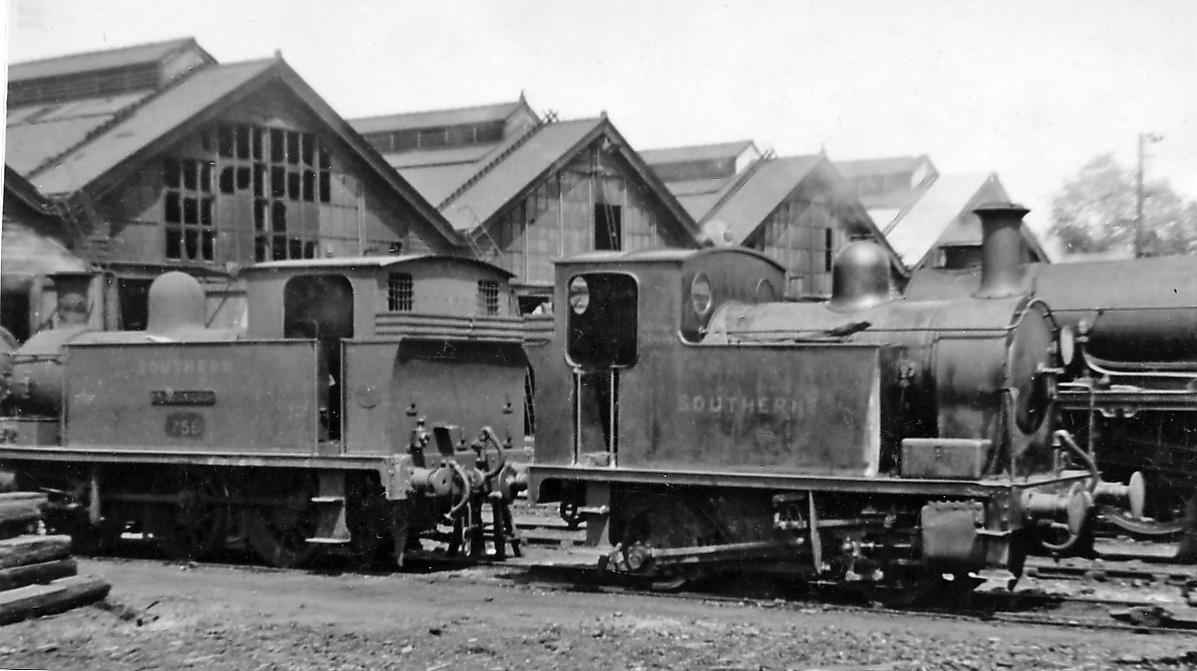
- C14 0-4-0T No. 3744 at Eastleigh Locomotive Depot 1946
Type and origin
- Power type: Steam
- Designer: Dugald Drummond
- Builder: C14: LSWR Nine Elms; S14: LSWR Eastleigh Works
- Build date: 1906–1910
- Total produced: C14: 10; S14: 2
Specifications
- Configuration
  - Whyte: C14: 2-2-0T later rebuilt to 0-4-0T; S14: 0-4-0T
  - UIC: C14: 1A n2t, later B n2t; S14: B n2t
- Gauge: 4 ft 8 1/2 in (1,435 mm)
- Leading dia.: 3 ft 0 in (0.914 m) (C14 only)
- Driver dia.: 3 ft 0 in (0.914 m)
- Loco weight: C14: 24 long tons (24.4 t; 26.9 short tons); S14: 28 long tons (28.4 t; 31.4 short tons)
- Fuel type: Coal
- Fuel capacity: 1 long ton (1,000 kg)
- Water cap.: 500 imp gal (2,300 L)
- Boiler pressure: C14: 150 psi (1.03 MPa); S14: 175 psi (1.21 MPa)
- Cylinders: Two (outside)
- Cylinder size: C14: 10 in × 14 in (254 mm × 356 mm); S14: 12 in × 18 in (305 mm × 457 mm)
Performance figures
- Tractive effort: C14: 4,958 lbf (22.05 kN); S14: 10,710 lbf (47.64 kN)
Career
- Operators: London and South Western Railway; Southern Railway; British Railways
- Retired: 1916-1917, 1957–1959
- Disposition: All scrapped

The London and South Western Railway C14 class was a class of ten 2-2-0 tank locomotives intended to work push–pull trains on lightly used lines in 1907. The S14 class was an 0-4-0 version of the same basic design. Both classes proved to be underpowered in this role and many examples were sold as light shunters during the First World War. Three C14 remained with the LSWR and were rebuilt as 0-4-0Ts. They lasted until the late 1950s.

== History ==
=== C14 class ===
During the first few years of the twentieth century, the London and South Western Railway became concerned about losses incurred on several branch and short-distance passenger services, and began to experiment with the use of steam-powered railmotors. The resulting units proved to be under-powered during the summer months when traffic was higher, and also inflexible, as the power unit was permanently connected to the coach. As an alternative Dugald Drummond designed a class of small 2-2-0 tank locomotives, based on the railmotor power units, which could be coupled to one or more carriages to cater for different levels of load. These were specifically equipped for Push–pull trains working. As built, the outside cylinders were situated between the leading and driving wheels.

The C14 class were tried out on a number of services during 1907. They were found to be more flexible than the railmotors but suffered from the same lack of power, as a result no further examples were built and the existing examples were gradually transferred to light shunting tasks or else were put into store. Four members of the class were used to shunt the lines on Town Quay in Southampton.

=== S14 class ===
Drummond persevered with a 0-4-0 S14 version of the design, with the cylinders moved forward in front of the coupled wheels, larger boiler, cylinders and wheels. Five were ordered in June 1908; however, only two of these were built, being delivered in September 1910. They were the first locomotives built at Eastleigh Works. In the meantime, the remainder of the order was cancelled in August 1910.

In 1913, Robert Urie ordered that four examples of the C14 class should be rebuilt as 0-4-0 tanks and the remainder withdrawn as they became in need of heavy repairs. Two examples were rebuilt in 1913, but the onset of the First World War brought an end to this programme.

=== World War I ===
In 1916, the War Office bought seven members of the C14 class (including one of the rebuilds) for use in various munitions facilities and dockyards. The two members of the S14 class were likewise sold to the Ministry of Munitions in 1917. After the war, these were sold for scrap, as stationary boilers or else exported.

=== Post-war ===
The last two 2-2-0 examples of the three locomotives remaining with LSWR were rebuilt in 1922 and 1923. The three survivors worked as dock shunters, or on departmental (non-revenue earning) duties under the Southern Railway and British Railways and were withdrawn between 1957 and 1959.

== Summary table ==
Class	Year	LSWR numbers	Rebuilt	Withdrawn	Notes
C14	1906	736	-	Mar 1917	Sold to Ministry of Munitions
C14	1906	737	-	Dec 1917	Sold to Admiralty
C14	1906	738	-	Mar 1917	Sold to Ministry of Munitions
C14	1906	739	-	Feb 1917	Sold to Bute Works Supply Company
C14	1906	740	-	Dec 1916	Sold to War Department
C14	1906	741	Mar 1922	Dec 1957	to SR 0741; BR 30588
C14	1906	742	-	Mar 1917	Sold to Ministry of Munitions
C14	1906	743	Jun 1913	Nov 1917	Sold to Admiralty
C14	1907	744	Oct 1923	Jun 1957	to SR 0744; to BR 30589
C14	1907	745	Apr 1913	Apr 1959	to SR 0745; to Redbridge Civil Engineers' Depot in 1927 as 77S; to BR as DS77
S14	1910	101	-	May 1917	Sold Ministry of Munitions
S14	1910	147	-	May 1917	Sold Ministry of Munitions
