= LSWR N15 class =

Class of 74 two-cylinder 4-6-0 locomotives

LSWR N15 class SR King Arthur class
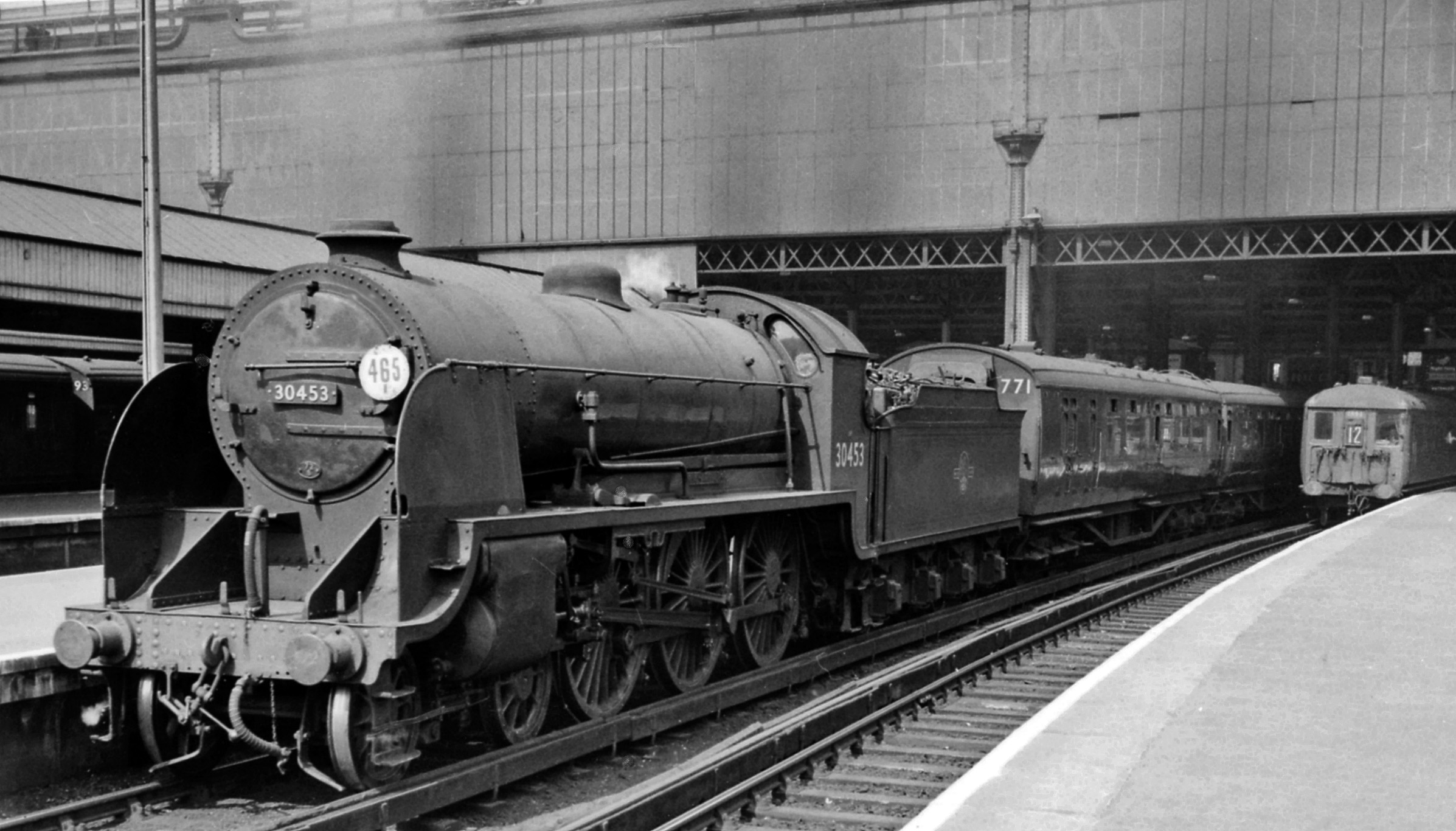
- 30453 King Arthur at Waterloo
Type and origin
- Power type: Steam
- Designer: Robert Urie; Richard Maunsell (redesign); Oliver Bulleid (modifications)
- Builder: SR Eastleigh Works (44); North British Locomotive Co. (30)
- Build date: 1918–1927
- Total produced: 74
Specifications
- Configuration
  - Whyte: 4-6-0
  - UIC: 2′C h2
- Gauge: 4 ft 8 1/2 in (1,435 mm) standard gauge
- Leading dia.: 3 feet 1 inch (0.940 m)
- Driver dia.: 6 feet 7 inches (2.007 m)
- Length: 66 feet 5 3/4 inches (20.26 m)
- Loco weight: 80 long tons 19 cwt (181,300 lb or 82.2 t) for numbers 448–452 and 763–792; 79 long tons 18 cwt (179,000 lb or 81.2 t) for numbers 453–457; 81 long tons 17 cwt (183,300 lb or 83.2 t) for numbers 793–806
- Fuel type: Coal
- Fuel capacity: 5 long tons 0 cwt (11,200 lb or 5.1 t) (Urie outside-frame bogie tender)
- Water cap.: 5,200 imp gal (23,600 L) (Urie outside-frame bogie tender); 5,000 imp gal (22,700 L) (Maunsell bogie tender); 4,500 imp gal (20,500 L) (Drummond bogie tender); 4,300 imp gal (19,500 L) (Drummond "watercart" tender); 3,500 imp gal (15,900 L) (Six-wheel tender)
- Boiler pressure: 180 psi (1.24 MPa) (Urie batch); 200 psi (1.38 MPa) (Eastleigh/Scotch batches)
- Cylinders: Two, outside
- Cylinder size: 22 in × 28 in (560 mm × 710 mm) (Urie batch – as built); 21 in × 28 in (530 mm × 710 mm) (Urie batch – as modified); 20 1/2 in × 28 in (520 mm × 710 mm) (Eastleigh/Scotch batches)
Performance figures
- Tractive effort: 26,245 lbf (116.74 kN) (Urie batch unmodified); 23,900 lbf (106.31 kN) (Urie batch as modified); 25,320 lbf (112.63 kN) (Maunsell Batches)
Career
- Operators: London and South Western Railway, Southern Railway, British Railways
- Class: LSWR: N15; SR / BR: King Arthur
- Power class: LSWR / SR: A; BR: 5P
- Nicknames: Eastleigh Arthurs, Scotch Arthurs, Scotchmen
- Locale: Southern Region
- Withdrawn: 1953 (1), 1955–1962
- Preserved: SR No. 777
- Disposition: One preserved, 2 boilers preserved, remainder scrapped

The LSWR N15 class is a British 4-6-0 2–cylinder express passenger steam locomotive designed by Robert Urie. The class has a complex build history spanning three sub-classes and ten years of construction from 1918 to 1927. The first batch of the class was constructed for the London and South Western Railway (LSWR), where they hauled heavy express passenger trains to the south coast ports and further west to Exeter. After the Lord Nelsons, they were the second biggest 4-6-0 passenger locomotives on the Southern Railway. They could reach speeds of up to 90 mph (145 km/h).

Following the grouping of railway companies in 1923, the LSWR became part of the Southern Railway (SR) and its publicity department gave the N15 locomotives names associated with Arthurian legend; the class hence becoming known as King Arthurs. The chief mechanical engineer (CME) of the newly formed company, Richard Maunsell, modified the Urie locomotives in the light of operational experience and increased the class strength to 74 locomotives. Maunsell and his Chief Draughtsman James Clayton incorporated several improvements, notably to the steam circuit and valve gear.

The new locomotives were built over several batches at Eastleigh Works and the North British Locomotive Company in Glasgow, leading to the nicknames of "Eastleigh Arthurs", "Scotch Arthurs" and Scotchmen in service. The class was subjected to smoke deflection experiments in 1926, becoming the first British class of steam locomotive to be fitted with smoke deflectors. Maunsell's successor, Oliver Bulleid, attempted to improve performance by altering exhaust arrangements. The locomotives continued operating with British Railways (BR) until the end of 1962. One example, SR N15 class 777 Sir Lamiel, is preserved as part of the National Collection and can be seen on mainline railtours.

== Background ==
Robert Urie completed his H15 class 4-6-0 mixed-traffic design in 1913 and the prototype was built in August 1914. It showed a marked improvement in performance over Dugald Drummond's LSWR T14 class 4-6-0 when tested on local and express passenger trains. The introduction of ten H15 engines into service coincided with the outbreak of the First World War, which prevented construction of further class members.

Despite the interruption caused by the conflict, Urie anticipated that peacetime increases in passenger traffic would necessitate longer trains from London to the south-west of England. Passenger loadings on the heavy boat trains to the London and South Western Railway's (LSWR) ports of Portsmouth, Weymouth and Southampton had been increasing prior to the war, and was beginning to overcome the capabilities of the LSWR's passenger locomotive fleet. His response was to produce a modern, standard express passenger design similar to the H15.

== Design and construction ==
Trials undertaken in 1914 with the H15 class prototype had demonstrated to Urie that the basic design showed considerable speed potential on the Western section of the LSWR from Basingstoke westwards, and could form the basis of a powerful new class of 4-6-0 express passenger locomotive with larger 6 ft 7 in (2.01 m) driving wheels. The LSWR required such a locomotive, which would need to cope with increasing train loads on this long and arduous route to the West Country. The result was the N15 class design, completed by Urie in 1917. It incorporated features from the H15 class, including double bogie eight-wheel tenders with outside plate frames over the wheels and exposed Walschaerts valve gear. High running plates along the boiler were retained for ease of oiling and maintenance.

Despite the similarities, the N15 class represented a refinement of the H15 template. The cylinders were increased in size to 22 in × 28 in (560 mm × 710 mm) in diameter, the largest used on a British steam locomotive at that time. The substantial boiler design was also different from the parallel version used on the H15, and became the first tapered types to be constructed at Eastleigh Works. Contrary to boiler construction practices elsewhere where tapering began near the firebox, it was restricted to the front end of the N15's barrel to reduce the diameter of the smokebox, and consequently the weight carried by the front bogie. The design also featured Urie's design of narrow-diameter "stovepipe" chimney, a large dome cover on top of the boiler, and his "Eastleigh" superheater.

=== "Urie N15s" ===
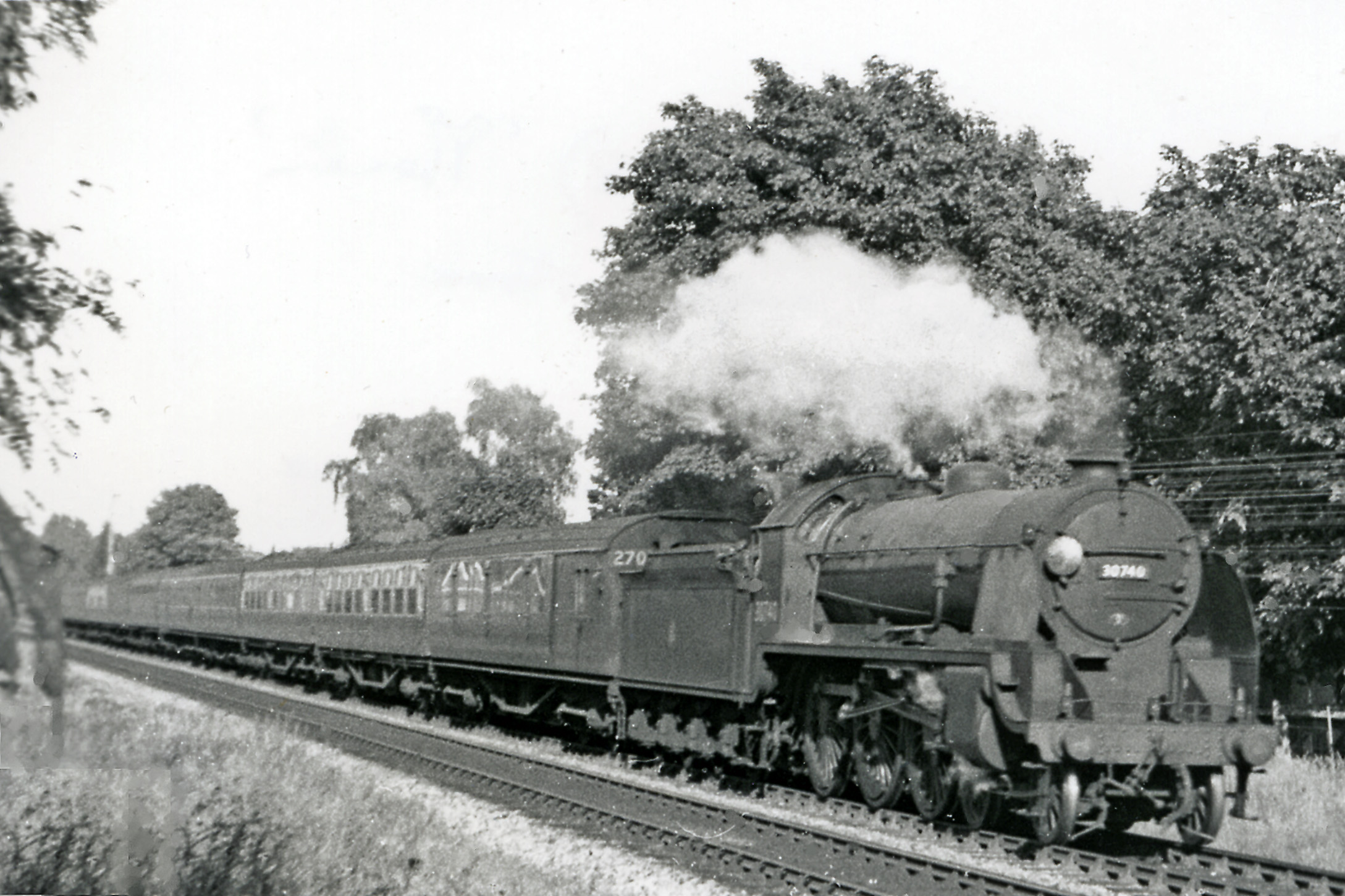
Urie N15 30740 'Merlin', near Branksome 1951

The N15 design was approved by the LSWR management committee, though the order for construction was postponed until wartime control of raw materials was relaxed. Government approval was obtained in mid–1918, and Eastleigh Works began to produce the LSWR's first new locomotive class since 1914.

The first locomotives, later known by crewmen as the "Urie N15s", were built in two ten-engine batches by the LSWR's Eastleigh Works between 1918–19 and 1922–23. Of the first batch, the prototype, No. 736 entered service on 31 August 1918, with four more appearing between September 1918 and April 1919. They shared a similar profile to Urie's H15 class with the use of flat-sided Drummond-style cabs with gently curving roofs. The double bogie tenders were outwardly similar in appearance to those used on the H15s, although strengthened during construction with extra internal bracing to hold 5,000 imperial gallons (22,700 L) of water. A shortage of copper delayed completion of Nos. 741–745, and the last of the batch emerged from Eastleigh in November 1919. After the running-in of Nos. 736–745 and an intensification of the LSWR timetable to the West Country, a second batch of ten was ordered in October 1921. They entered service over the period June 1922 – March 1923, and were numbered in the series 746–755.

At Grouping in January 1923, the LSWR became part of the new Southern Railway, whose chief mechanical engineer (CME) was Richard Maunsell. Maunsell planned to introduce his own designs of express passenger locomotive, one of which was to become the future Lord Nelson class. Despite this, there was a short-term need to maintain existing services that required modification and expansion of Urie's N15 design.

=== Maunsell's "Eastleigh Arthurs": Drummond rebuilds ===
Maunsell's projected design of express passenger locomotive was not ready for introduction during the summer timetable of 1925, so a third batch of 10 N15s was ordered for construction at Eastleigh. This batch was part of an outstanding LSWR order to rebuild 15 of Drummond's unsuccessful 4-cylinder F13, G14 and P14 classes 4-6-0s into 2–cylinder H15 class locomotives. Only the five F13s were converted to H15s; the remaining 10 G14 and P14s classes (Nos. 448–457, renumbered E448–E457) were rebuilt as N15s, implementing modifications to Urie's original design.

The modifications are attributed to Maunsell's Chief Draughtsman James Clayton, who had transferred to Ashford railway works in 1914 from Derby Works. They were the result of cooperation between the South Eastern and Chatham Railway (SECR) and the Great Western Railway (GWR) when Maunsell was seconded to the Railway Executive Committee during the First World War. The aim was to create a series of standard freight and passenger locomotives for use throughout Britain, and meant that Clayton was privy to the latest GWR developments in steam design. These included streamlined steam passages, long-travel valves, the maximisation of power through reduced cylinder sizes and higher boiler pressure.

Maunsell initiated trials with Urie N15 No. 442 in 1924, and proved that better performance could be obtained by altering the steam circuit, valve travel and draughting arrangements. As a result, Clayton reduced the N15 cylinder diameter to 20.5 inches (520 mm) and replaced the safety valves with Ross pop valves set to 200 psi (1.38 MPa) boiler pressure. The Urie boiler was retained, though the Eastleigh superheater was replaced by a Maunsell type with 10 per cent greater superheating surface area. This was supplemented by a larger steam chest and an increased-diameter chimney casting specially designed for the rebuilds. It incorporated a rim and capuchon to control exhaust flow into the atmosphere. Valve events (the timing of valve movements with the piston) were also revised to promote efficient steam usage and the wheels were re-balanced to reduce hammerblow.

When rebuilding was complete, only the numbers, smokebox doors with centre tightening handles and the flat-sided cabs remained of the G14 and P14 classes. The rebuilds retained their distinctive Drummond "watercart" tenders, which were modified with the removal of the complex injector feedwater heating equipment. The "watercart" tenders were of 4,300 imp gal (19,500 L) water and 5.00 long tons (5.1 t) coal capacity. The 10 rebuilds became the first members of the King Arthur class upon entering service.

=== "Scotch Arthurs" ===
As the Drummond G14 and P14 4-6-0s were rebuilt to the N15 specification at Eastleigh, a lack of production capacity due to repair and overhaul meant that Maunsell ordered a further batch of 20 locomotives from the North British Locomotive Company in 1924. The company had under-quoted to gain the contract, which meant that production of the batch was rushed. The necessity to maintain an intensive timetable on the Southern Railway's Western section prompted an increase of the order to 30 locomotives (Nos. E763–E792). Their construction in Glasgow would gain them the "Scotch Arthurs" nickname in service. They were all delivered to the Southern Railway by October 1925, and featured the front-end refinements used on the Drummond rebuilds.

The North British batch was built to the Southern's new composite loading gauge and differed from previous batches in having an Ashford-style cab based upon that used on the N class. Unlike the Drummond cab retained by Nos. 448–457 and E741–E755, the Ashford cab was of an all-steel construction and had a roof that was flush with the cab sides, allowing it to be used on gauge-restricted routes in the east of the network. It was inspired by the standard cab developed in 1904 by R. M. Deeley for the Midland Railway, and was one of a number of Midland features introduced by Clayton to the SECR and subsequently the Southern Railway. The smokebox door was revised to the Ashford pattern, which omitted the use of central tightening handles in favour of clamps around the circumference. The batch was fitted with the Urie-designed, North British-built 5,000 imp gal (22,700 L) capacity double-bogie tenders.

=== Maunsell's "Eastleigh Arthurs": second batch ===
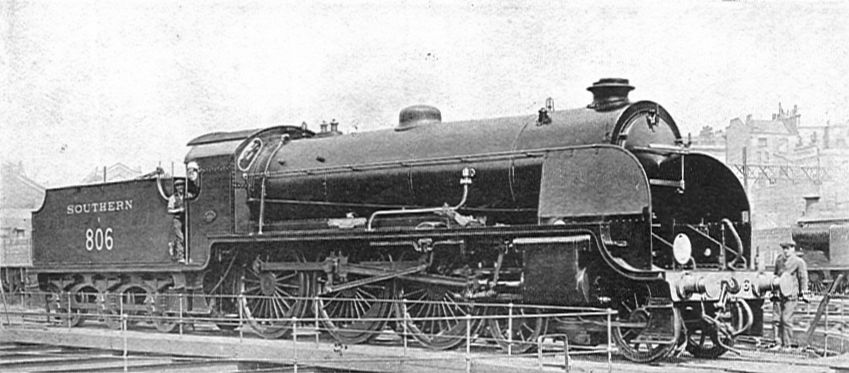
N15 No. 806 Sir Galleron, a member of the second "Eastleigh Arthur" batch. The locomotive is fitted to a six-wheel N class tender for use on restricted Central section turntables

With the "Scotch Arthurs" in service, the Southern Railway had an ample fleet of express passenger locomotives for its Western section routes. As part of a process of fleet standardisation, the Operating Department expressed a desire replace obsolescent locomotives on the Eastern and Central sections with the King Arthur class. In May 1925, a batch of 25 locomotives (Nos. E793–E817) based upon the Scotch Arthurs was ordered for construction at Eastleigh with smaller firebox grates and improved water heating surfaces. After the first 14 (Nos. E793–E806) were built, it was decided to discontinue construction in favour of Maunsell's new 4-cylinder Lord Nelson class design in June 1926.

The Operating Department intended to equip Nos. E793–E807 with six-wheel, 4,000 imp gal (18,200 L) capacity tenders for use on the former SECR lines of the Eastern section. These were to replace Scotch Arthurs Nos. E763–E772 on boat train duties. This was because the 5,000 imp gal (22,700 L) tenders attached to Nos. E763–E772 were better suited to the longer routes of the Western section. The final ten engines (Nos. E808–E817) were for the former LBSCR routes of the Central section, where short turntables restricted tender size to the 3,500 imp gal (15,900 L) Ashford variety used on the N class. After the order was changed to the Lord Nelson class design, 14 N class tenders were fitted to Nos. E793–E806 for use the Central section. The high draw-gear (the link between locomotive and tender) of the N class tenders necessitated modification to the frames beneath the cab.

=== Naming the locomotives ===
When the former Drummond G14 and P14 4-6-0s were rebuilt to Maunsell's N15 specification in February 1925, the Southern Railway decided to give names to all express passenger locomotives. Because of the railway's association with the West of England, the Public Relations Officer, John Elliot suggested that members of the N15 class should be named after characters and places associated with the legend of King Arthur. When Maunsell was told of the decision to name the locomotives, he replied: "Tell Sir Herbert [Walker] I have no objection, but I warn you, it won't make any difference to the working of the engines". Walker was the General Manager of the Southern Railway, who had told Elliot that Maunsell's permission was required. The first G14 to be rebuilt, No. E453, was given the first name and christened King Arthur. The Urie locomotives (hitherto referred as N15s rather than King Arthurs) were also given names connected with Arthurian legend and were referred to as "Urie Arthurs"; the Maunsell batches of N15s were nicknamed the "Eastleigh" and "Scotch Arthurs".

== Operational details ==
The N15 class was intended to haul heavy expresses over the long LSWR mainlines between Waterloo, Weymouth, Exeter and Plymouth. Locomotives were changed at Salisbury before the upgrading of the South Western Mainline in 1922, when fast running through to Exeter was possible. The Southern Railway's motive power re-organisation following the Grouping of 1923 saw the class allocated to sheds across the network and used on Bournemouth to Oxford cross-country trains. Operations were expanded to more restricted Central and Eastern section mainlines in 1925, and suitably modified class members hauled commuter and heavy boat trains from London Victoria to Dover Marine and expresses to Brighton. In 1931, No. E780 Sir Persant hauled the inaugural Bournemouth Belle Pullman train from Waterloo to Bournemouth West.

In peacetime, the class was occasionally used on fast freights from Southampton Docks, although it was common to see them at the head of freight and troop trains during the Second World War. Ten "Urie Arthurs" were transferred to the London and North Eastern Railway (LNER) in October 1942, and were based at Heaton shed for use on freight and occasional passenger trains in the north east and southern Scotland. They returned to the Southern Railway in July 1943 after the introduction of United States Army Transportation Corps (USATC) S160 class 2-8-0s into service. From 1945 the King Arthur class regularly deputised for Bulleid's new Pacifics, which were experiencing poor serviceability due to mechanical failures. The entire class came into British Railways ownership in 1948: they could be found in most areas of the Southern Region on medium-length expresses and stopping trains on the ex-LSWR mainline.

=== Smoke deflector experiments ===
In 1926, the N15 class became the first in Britain equipped with smoke deflectors, with several designs tested. Experiments were undertaken throughout 1926 and included the fitting of a curved plate above the smokebox of No. E753 Melisande to channel air from below the chimney to lift the exhaust above the locomotive when on the move. Nos. E450 Sir Kay and E783 Sir Gillemere had air scoops attached to the chimney, whilst E772 Sir Percivale was fitted with large, square German-type smoke deflectors. Finally, No. E453 King Arthur was fitted with small, rectangular smoke deflectors fitted to the handrails on the smokebox sides. The experiments produced mixed results, and Maunsell requested the assistance of the University of London in staging wind tunnel tests . These resulted in a standard plate design (illustrated in the infobox), which was gradually fitted to the class from late 1927 onwards.

=== Performance of the Urie batch and modifications ===
Under LSWR ownership, the N15s were initially well received by crews, though the batch soon gained a reputation for poor steaming on long runs. Through running of the class into Exeter was stopped in favour of engine changes at Salisbury, and Urie attributed the problem to poor driving technique. A series of trial runs changed this assumption, and demonstrated that steam pressure gradually decreased on the flat. The trials also revealed that the robust construction of the motion produced the heaviest hammerblow of any British locomotive class, and had caused cracked frames on the test locomotive.

Another criticism from locomotive crews concerned the exposed cab in bad weather, which necessitated the installation of a tarpaulin sheet over the rear of the cab and the front of the tender, restricting rearward vision. The 1921 Coal Miners’ strike meant that two class members (Nos. 737 and 739) were converted to oil-burning. One of the modified locomotives subsequently caught fire at Salisbury shed, and both were reverted to coal firing by the end of the year. When the LSWR was amalgamated into the Southern Railway in 1923, Urie had done little to remedy the shortcomings of the N15s, and it fell to his successor to improve the class.

When Maunsell inherited the design as CME of the Southern Railway, he began trials using the weakest N15 (No. 742) in 1924. The results indicated that better performance could be obtained by altering the steam circuit, valve travel and draughting arrangements, although the first two recommendations were deemed too costly for immediate implementation by the Locomotive Committee. Eight extra King Arthur-type boilers were ordered from North British and fitted to N15s Nos. 737–742 by December 1925 in an effort to improve steaming. The remaining Urie boilers were fitted with standard Ross pop safety valves to ease maintenance. Maunsell also addressed draughting problems caused by the narrow Urie "stovepipe" chimney. The exhaust arrangements were modified on No. 737 using the King Arthur chimney design and reduced-diameter blastpipes. This proved successful, and all "Urie N15s" were modified over the period 1925–1929. The oil-burning equipment was refitted to Nos. 737 and 739 during the 1926 General Strike and removed in December of that year.

Beginning in 1928, all but No. 755 had their cylinder diameter reduced from 22 inches (560 mm) to 21 inches (530 mm) when renewals were due, improving speed on flat sections of railway, but affecting their performance on the gradients west of Salisbury. No. 755 The Red Knight was modified in 1940 by Maunsell's successor, Oliver Bulleid with his own design of 21-inch (530 mm) cylinders and streamlined steam passages. This was married to a Lemaître multiple-jet blastpipe and wide-diameter chimney, allowing the locomotive to produce performances akin to the more powerful Lord Nelson class. Four other N15s were so modified with four more on order, though the latter were cancelled due to wartime shortages of metal. The soft exhaust of the Lemaître multiple-jet blastpipe precipitated an adjustment to the smoke deflectors on three converted locomotives, with the tops angled to the vertical in an attempt to improve air-flow along the boiler cladding. This failed to achieve the desired effect, and the final two modified locomotives retained the Maunsell-style deflectors.

The final modifications to the "Urie N15s" involved the conversion of five locomotives (Nos. 740, 745, 748, 749 and 752) to oil-firing in 1946–1947. This was in response to a government scheme to address a post-war coal shortage. The oil tanks were fabricated from welded steel and fitted within the tender coal space. After initial problems with No. 740 Merlin were rectified, the oil-fired locomotives proved good performers on Bournemouth services. A further addition to the oil-fired locomotives was electric headcode and cab lighting, which was retained when the engines reverted to coal-firing in 1948.

=== Performance of the Maunsell batches and modifications ===
The improved front-end layout applied to the first batch of "Eastleigh Arthurs" (Nos. E448–E457) ensured continuous fast running on flat sections of track around London, although their propensity for speed was sometimes compromised over the hilly terrain west of Salisbury. The inside bearings of the Drummond "watercart" tenders proved problematic, as they were too small for the load carried and suffered from water ingress. The retention of the tall Drummond cab prevented use away from the Western section of the Southern Railway. Despite these problems, their operational reliability prompted the management to arrange the visit of No. E449 Sir Torre to the Darlington Railway Centenary celebrations in July 1925. No. E449 also recorded speeds of up to 90 mph (140 km/h) on the South West Mainline near Axminster in 1929. This proved that with the right components, Urie's original design could perform well.

Despite the successful use of modified N15 components to rebuild Nos. E448–E457, the mechanically similar "Scotch Arthurs" proved disappointing when put into service from May 1925. The performance of those allocated to the Eastern section was indifferent, and failed to improve upon the double-headed ex-SECR 4-4-0s they were to replace. Reports of poor steaming and hot driving and tender wheel axleboxes were common from crewmen and shed fitters. After investigation, the problems were attributed to poor workmanship during construction as the North British Locomotive Company underquoted production costs to gain the contract. Defects were found in boiler construction across the batch, and necessitated six replacement boilers, re-riveting, re-fitting of tubes and replacement of firebox stays. The hot driving wheel axleboxes were caused by the main frames being out of alignment. A 1926 report suggested that all affected locomotives should be taken to Eastleigh for repair. Once repaired, the "Scotch Arthurs" proved as capable as the rest of the class in service.

"Scotch Arthurs" Nos. E763–E772 received new tenders between 1928 and 1930 in a series of tender exchanges with the Lord Nelson and LSWR S15 classes. This ensured that they could exchange their Urie 5,000 imp gal (22,700 L) bogie tenders with the 4,000 imp gal (18,200 L) Ashford design for use on the shorter Eastern section routes. Whilst useful for the roster clerks at Battersea shed, any transfer to the Western section was hampered because of their shorter range. By 1937, all had reverted to the Urie 5,000 imp gal (22,700 L) bogie tenders, though Nos. E768–E772 were attached to new Maunsell flush-sided tenders with brake vacuum reservoirs fitted behind the coal space. These were again swapped with Maunsell LSWR-style bogie tenders fitted to the Lord Nelson class.

The second batch of "Eastleigh Arthurs" displaced the ex-K class tanks and ex-LBSCR H2 "Atlantic" 4-4-2 locomotives on the Eastbourne and Bognor Regis routes respectively. They were well liked by crews and used on this part of the network until the arrival of electrification. No. E782 Sir Brian was used on the former Great Northern main line for performance trials against the SECR K and K1 class tanks following the Sevenoaks railway accident in 1927. The tests were supervised by the London and North Eastern Railway's CME, Sir Nigel Gresley, who commented that the class was unstable at high speeds. The instability was caused by motion hammerblow and exacerbated by irregularities in track-work. This caused excessive stress to the axleboxes and poor riding characteristics on the footplate. Despite this, the class benefited from an excellent maintenance regime.

Maunsell's successor Oliver Bulleid believed that there was little need to improve draughting on this series. However, reports of poor steaming with No. 792 Sir Hervis de Revel gave him an opportunity to trial a Lemaître multiple-jet blastpipe and wide-diameter chimney on a Maunsell N15 in 1940. This did not enhance performance to the extent of No. 755 The Red Knight. Under British Railways ownership, the locomotive was re-fitted with the Maunsell chimney in March 1952 with no further problems reported. In another wartime experiment, Bulleid fitted No. 783 Sir Gillemere with three thin "stovepipe" chimneys in November 1940. These were set in a triangular formation to reduce visibility of exhaust from the air in response to attacks made by low-flying aircraft on Southern Railway trains. The "stovepipes" were reduced to two, producing a fierce exhaust blast that dislodged soot inside tunnels and under bridges. The experiment was discontinued in February 1941 and the locomotive re-fitted with a Maunsell King Arthur chimney. The last experiment was with spark-arresting equipment in response to lineside fires caused by poor quality coal. Nos. 784 Sir Nerovens and 788 Sir Urre of the Mount were fitted with new wide-diameter chimneys in late 1947. Test-trains showed mixed results and the trials were stopped in 1951 after improvements in coal quality and the fitting of internal smokebox spark-arrestors.

=== Withdrawal ===
The detail variations across the class meant the "Urie N15s" were placed into store over the winters of 1949 and 1952. The Maunsell King Arthur examples were easier to maintain, and the large number of modern Bulleid Pacific and British Railways Standard classes were able to undertake similar duties. The "Urie N15s" were brought into service during the summer months, although their deteriorating condition was demonstrated when No. 30754 The Green Knight was withdrawn with cracked frames in 1953. The slow running-down of the "Urie N15s" continued between 1955–1957, and several were stored prior to withdrawal. The last three were withdrawn from service at Basingstoke shed, with No. 30738 "King Pellinore" the final example to cease operation in March 1958. All were broken up for scrap, though their names were given to 20 BR Standard Class 5 locomotives allocated to the Southern Region between 1959–1962.

The Maunsell King Arthur class also faced a decrease in suitable work on the Central and Eastern sections following the introduction of BR Standard class 5MT and BR Standard Class 4 4-6-0s in 1955. The gradual withdrawal of the "Urie N15s", H15s and SR N15x classes presented an opportunity to replace the ageing Drummond "watercart" tenders fitted to Nos. 448–457 with Urie 5,000 imp gal (22,700 L) bogie tenders. This coincided with a 1958 programme to similarly change the 3,500 imp gal (15,900 L) Ashford tenders fitted to eight of the second batch "Eastleigh Arthurs". The class remained intact until the completion of the Eastern section electrification when 17 were made redundant in 1959. More withdrawals took place in 1960 when an increase in Bulleid Pacifics allocated to the Western section reduced available work. The ranks thinned to 12 in 1961, and further withdrawals reduced the class to one, No. 30770 Sir Prianius. The class outlasted the newer – but less numerous – Lord Nelson class by one month when No. 30770 was withdrawn from service at Basingstoke Shed in November 1962.

Table of withdrawals
Year	Quantity in service at start of year	Number withdrawn	Quantity withdrawn	Locomotive numbers
1953	74	1	1	30754
1955	73	4	5	30740/43/46/52
1956	69	6	11	30736–37/41/44–45/47
1957	63	8	19	30739/42/48–51/53/55
1958	55	3	22	30454, 30738/66
1959	52	17	39	30449/52/55, 30767/76/78–80/84–87/89/92/97, 30801/05
1960	35	9	48	30448/50/56, 30763/69/74–75/91/94
1961	26	14	62	30453/57, 30764/68/71–72/77/83/90/99, 30800/02–03/06
1962	12	12	74	30451, 30765/70/73/81–82/88/93/95–96/98, 30804

== Accidents and incidents ==
- In 1940, No. 751 Etarre, No. 755 The Red Knight, No. 775 Sir Agravaine, and No. 776 Sir Galagars along with T14 No. 458 and N15X No. 2328 Hackworth suffered bomb damage during the air raid on Nine Elms shed. No. 458 was scrapped and the other engines were eventually repaired.
- On 16 August 1944, 806 Sir Galleron was damaged by a V-1 flying bomb whilst pulling a passenger train in Upchurch; eight people were killed. The locomotive was eventually repaired and put back into service.
- On 26 November 1947, locomotive No. 753 King Arthur was hauling a passenger train that was in a rear-end collision with another, the other being hauled by SR Lord Nelson Class 4-6-0 No. 860 Lord Hawke, at Farnborough, Hampshire, due to a signalman's error. Two people were killed.
- On 22 January 1955, locomotive No. 30783 Sir Gillemere collided with H15 No. 30485 at Bournemouth Central station after its driver misread signals. The locomotive was subsequently repaired; The H15 was condemned.
- On 18 September 1962, locomotive No. 30770 Sir Prianus was hauling a newspaper train that caught fire between Knowle Junction and Botley. Four of the five carriages were destroyed.

== Livery and numbering ==
=== LSWR and Southern Railway ===
Under LSWR ownership, the "Urie N15s" were painted in Urie's LSWR sage green livery for passenger locomotives. This was distinct from Drummond's sage green because it was more olive in colour, and yellowed with cleaning and weathering. Black and white lining decorated the boiler bands and borders of the sage green panels. The lettering was in gilt: the initials "LSWR" located on the side of the tender, the locomotive number on the cabside.

The first Southern livery continued that of the LSWR, though with primrose yellow transfers showing "SOUTHERN" and the locomotive number, placed on the tender. The lining separating the black border on tender and cab side panels was changed to yellow. Primrose yellow transfers, showing "SOUTHERN" and the locomotive number, were placed on the tender. An "E" prefix was located above the tender number (e.g. E749), denoting that the class was registered for maintenance at Eastleigh works. The gilt numerals on the cabside and tender rear were replaced by a cast oval plate with "Southern Railway" around the edge and the number located in the centre. Yellow numerals were painted onto the front buffer beam to ease identification. In February 1925 Maunsell developed a deeper green with black and white lining. This was applied to his new King Arthur class locomotives and the "Urie N15s" were similarly painted when overhauls were due. Wheels were olive-green with black tyres. From 1929 the "E" prefix was removed and the cast numerals on the tender rear were removed and replaced with yellow transfers (e.g. 749).

In May 1938, after Bulleid's appointment as CME, No. 749 Iseult was trialled in bright unlined light green with yellow-painted block numerals replacing the cast numberplates. The tender was given two designs of lettering, with "SOUTHERN" on one side and the initials "SR" on the other. The Board of Directors disapproved and Bulleid repainted the locomotive in darker malachite green with black and white lining (this would later be applied to his Pacifics). The legend "SOUTHERN" in block-lettering remained on the tender, though the number was relocated to the cabside on one side and the smoke deflector on the other. Both were painted in a light "sunshine yellow". No. 749 was returned to Maunsell's green livery.

Several variations of the Maunsell green, Urie sage green and Bulleid malachite green liveries were tried with black, white/black, and yellow lining, some sporting a green panel on the smoke deflectors. However, from 1942 to 1946, during the Second World War and its aftermath, members of the class under overhaul were turned out in unlined-black livery as a wartime economy measure, with green-shaded sunshine yellow lettering. The final Southern livery used from 1946 reverted to malachite green, with yellow/black lining, and sunshine yellow lettering. Some of the class (Nos. 782 and 800, Sir Brian and Sir Persant) did not receive this livery.

=== British Railways ===
British Railways gave the class the power classification of 5P after nationalisation in 1948. For the first 18 months the locomotives sported a transitional livery: Southern Railway malachite green with "BRITISH RAILWAYS" on the tender in sunshine yellow lettering. As each member of the class became due for a heavy general overhaul, they were repainted in the new standard British Railways express passenger livery of Brunswick green with orange and black lining from April 1949. Initially, the British Railways "Cycling Lion" crest was located on the tender, replaced from the 1957 by the later "Ferret and Dartboard" crest.

Numbering was initially a continuation of the Southern Railway system, though an 'S' prefix was added to denote a pre-nationalisation locomotive, so that No. 448 would become No. s448. As each locomotive became due for overhaul and received its new livery, the numbering was changed to the British Railways standard numbering system, in the series 30448–30457 for the first ten and 30736–30806 for the rest.

== Operational assessment and preservation ==
After the poor steaming of the Urie batch was addressed, the class proved popular amongst crews, mechanically reliable and capable of high speeds. However, their heavy hammerblow at speed meant that they were prone to rough riding and instability. The two Maunsell batches with their streamlined steam passages and better draughting arrangements were superior in performance, and were a popular choice when Bulleid's locomotives were unavailable. Their use of standard parts considerably eased maintenance, and the fitting of different tender and cab sizes meant few operational restrictions for the class on mainline routes. The class gave many years of service, and were noted for their ability to "do the job". The electrification of the Eastern and Central sections and the increasing number of Bulleid Pacifics in service meant the lack of a suitable role for the class under British Railways ownership. In spite of the reduction in work, high mileages were obtained with No. 30745 Tintagel achieving 1,464,032 miles (2,356,131 km) in service.

The decision to preserve a member of the class was made in November 1960. It was first intended to preserve the King Arthur class doyen No. 30453 King Arthur, and it was stored for a time after withdrawal in 1961 pending restoration to museum condition. However, it was decided to restore the preserved locomotive to as-built condition, and the lack of a suitable Drummond "watercart" tender precluded this consideration. No. 30453 was subsequently scrapped and it was decided to preserve one of the North British-built batch, No. 30777 Sir Lamiel, withdrawn in October 1961, instead. Sir Lamiel was named after a character in Thomas Malory's Le Morte d'Arthur, Sir Lamiel of Cardiff. This locomotive was restored to Maunsell livery as No. E777, and became part of the National Collection. It was restored to the later British Railways livery in 2003. As of 2022, 30777 is under overhaul to service. The Mid-Hants Railway is in possession of two N15 boilers which belonged to No. 30451 Sir Lamorak and No. 30799 Sir Ironside. These boilers have been fitted and steamed for LSWR S15 No. 506

== Models ==
In 2007, Hornby Railways introduced a model of the N15 in OO gauge.

== See also ==
- List of King Arthur class locomotives
