= LSWR H15 class =

Class of 26 two-cylinder locomotives

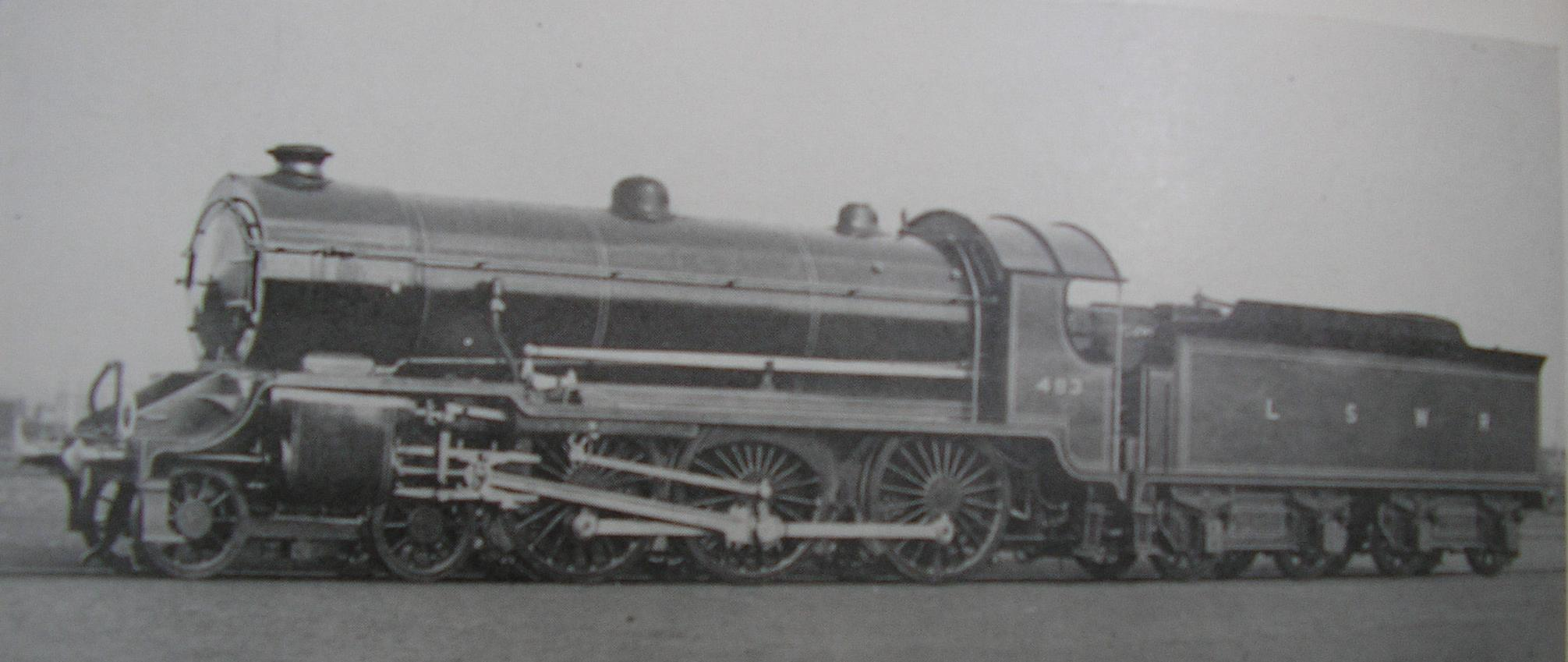
- Official 1914 LSWR works photograph of Urie H15 class mixed-traffic locomotive No. 483 at Eastleigh. Smoke deflectors were fitted during the early 1930s.
Type and origin
- Power type: Steam
- Designer: Robert Urie
- Builder: SR Eastleigh Works
- Build date: 1914 (11) 1924–1925 (15)
- Total produced: 26
Specifications
- Configuration
  - Whyte: 4-6-0
  - UIC: 2′C h2
- Gauge: 4 ft 8 1/2 in (1,435 mm) standard gauge
- Leading dia.: 3 ft 7 in (1.092 m)
- Driver dia.: 6 ft 0 in (1.829 m)
- Length: 65 ft 6 3/4 in (19.98 m)
- Loco weight: Various – 79 long tons 19 hundredweight (81.2 t) to 82 long tons 1 hundredweight (83.4 t)
- Fuel type: Coal
- Fuel capacity: 5 long tons (5.1 t; 5.6 short tons)
- Water cap.: 5,000 imp gal (23,000 L; 6,000 US gal)
- Boiler pressure: New: 180 psi (1.24 MPa); Rebuilt E14: 175 psi (1.21 MPa)
- Cylinders: Two, outside
- Cylinder size: 21 in × 28 in (533 mm × 711 mm)
Performance figures
- Tractive effort: 26,240 lbf (116.72 kN)
Career
- Operators: London and South Western Railway; → Southern Railway; → British Railways
- Class: LSWR/SR: H15
- Power class: LSWR / SR: A; BR: 4MT, later 4P5F
- Numbers: LSWR: 335, 482–491; SR: E330–E335, E473–E478, E482–E492, E521–E524 → 330–335, 473–478, 482–492, 521–524; BR: 30330–30335, 30473–30478, 30482–30491, 30521–30524
- Nicknames: Chonker, "Junior King Arthurs", "Cathedrals"
- Locale: Southern Region
- Withdrawn: 1955–1961
- Disposition: All scrapped

The LSWR/SR H15 class was a class of 2-cylinder 4-6-0 steam locomotives designed by Robert Urie for mixed-traffic duties on the LSWR. Further batches were constructed by Richard Maunsell for the Southern Railway after 1923. They were given the nickname of "Junior King Arthur" due to the size of their driving wheels, with those on the S15 and their N15 counterparts being 5 ft 7 in (1.70 m) and 6 ft 7 in (2.01 m) diameters respectively.

== Construction history ==
The H15 class represented Robert Urie's first design for the LSWR. It was created in response to a desperate lack of adequate locomotives in service on the LSWR that could be utilised for heavy freight duties. Reliability was also an issue, with ageing locomotive designs taking their toll on the LSWR's resources.

The resultant design was an outside 2-cylinder locomotive fitted with outside Walschaerts valve gear for ease of maintenance, with all the working parts relatively accessible when compared to previous designs operating on the LSWR system.

Ten locomotives (numbers 482–491) were built new by Eastleigh Works with 180 lbf/in^{2} (1.24 MPa) boilers. They appeared in January to July 1914. Urie was a proponent of superheating, so in order to gain experience and data on performance and fuel economy, four of the locomotives (482–485) were fitted with Schmidt superheaters, four (486–489) with Robinson superheaters, and two (490–491) were built as saturated locomotives. The last two had a lower weight than the first eight.

While the data gained from this small experiment showed the benefits of superheating, neither design of superheater was deemed suitable by Urie, so he designed and patented his own: the Eastleigh superheater, which was subsequently fitted to all members of the H15 class.

An additional locomotive was a rebuild of the 1905 E14 class No. 335 undertaken in December 1914. The locomotive had been scheduled for major modifications by Urie's predecessor Dugald Drummond in the light of poor operational performance. Urie, instead of modifying it, rebuilt it as the eleventh member of the H15 class. It was the first locomotive to be fitted with an Eastleigh superheater, but it retained its original boiler pressure of 175 lbf/in^{2} (1.21 MPa).

However, improvements were made to the overall design whilst the locomotive was under production at Eastleigh Works. The earlier class members mounted a lower running plate that was raised above the cylinders for clearance. These locomotives also sported a single, straight splasher above the driving wheels, an embellishment that would feature on Urie's later N15 class. The later production locomotives did not feature this design, with a higher-mounted straight running plate above the driving wheels, a feature that was perpetuated on the later S15 class design by Urie.

A total of 26 locomotives were completed in six batches, including number 335, over a period of twelve years. The first two batches of five in each were constructed in 1914. A further fifteen locomotives were constructed in three consecutive batches during 1924, the final one appearing in January 1925, and these were constructed under the auspices of Richard Maunsell, Urie's successor. Amongst the final batches of the class was another rebuild project concerning five members of the Drummond F13 Class. Maunsell's own batch of ten locomotives were a continuation of the design set out by Urie with number 491.

Year	Order	Quantity	LSWR/SR numbers	Notes
1914	H15	5	482, 483, 485–487	
1914	K15	5	484, 488–491	
1914	—	1	335	rebuilt from E14 class
1924	R16	5	473–477	
1924	T16	5	478, 521–524	
1924	A17	5	330–334	F13 class rebuilds

The class was provided with a 5,000 gallon Drummond 'watercart' eight-wheeled tender design that enabled them to travel on the long distances of the LSWR network which never had water troughs. Further modifications to the class were made by Maunsell during the mid-1930s with the provision of smoke deflectors.

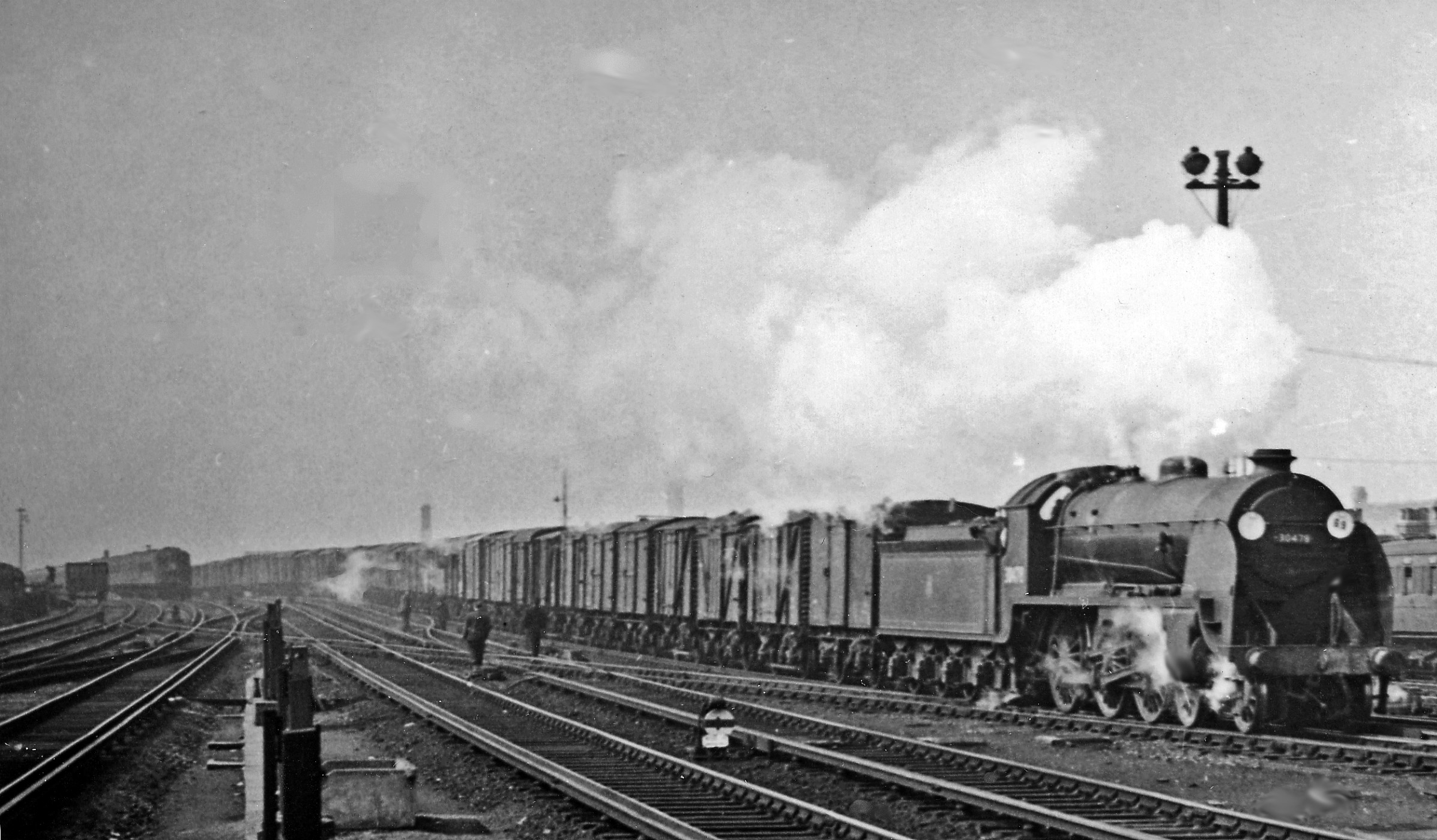
H15 30478 approaching Clapham Junction 1958

== Operational details ==
With their 21 × 28 inch cylinders allied with 6 ft 0 in driving wheels and a free-steaming boiler, they proved to be very capable of handling heavy trains. General overhauls revealed that they were very well built. When 30487 was stripped down for general repairs in 1954, it was found that the frames showed little sign of forty years of regular use. During their careers they were used on fast, heavy freights, and were particularly familiar around Okehampton hauling stone trains.

The Drummond F13 rebuild were notable for having very tall cabs, requiring footplate staff shorter than 6 foot in height to stand on improvised stools to reach some controls. This resulted in those class members with this feature being nicknamed 'Cathedrals'. This nickname does not seem to have been applied to the rest of the class, although crews from Guildford depot referred to the others as the 'City Breed'. All members of the class had been withdrawn by 1961 as a result of the BR 1955 Modernisation Plan, and no locomotives survived into preservation.

== Accidents and incidents ==
- On 22 January 1955, locomotive No. 30485 was in collision with N15 No. 30783 Sir Gillemere at Bournemouth Central station after the driver of the latter had misread signals. The locomotive was consequently withdrawn and scrapped.
- On 8 February 1956, locomotive No. 30477 was derailed in an accident near Chichester.

== Livery and numbering ==
=== LSWR and Southern ===
Livery was initially LSWR Drummond Lined Passenger Green livery, this being complemented by purple-brown edging and double yellow lining. The initials 'LSWR' were located on the tender, and the number was placed on the cabside.

The first Southern livery, as displayed by the 1924 batch, continued that of the LSWR, though with the number displayed on the tender. However, from 1925, a darker Olive-type green was substituted, and the entire class was so outshopped. Wheels were green with black tyres. Primrose Yellow 'Southern' and locomotive number transfers were placed on the tender tank.

By 1939, after Oliver Bulleid's appointment as Chief Mechanical Engineer, the locomotives had been outshopped in an unlined black livery to denote their freight status subject to livery experimentation. 'Southern' remained on the tender, though the number transfer was moved to the cabside, both in 'Sunshine Yellow' lettering. During wartime service, a further modification to the livery was made with a green shading on the 'Sunshine' lettering. The final Southern livery reverted to 'Sunshine Yellow' lettering and numbering.

The first two batches of five were numbered 482–491. The later batches received the numbers 521–524, 330–334 (F13 rebuilds) and 473–478, and the final member was number E14 rebuild 335, which provided the basis for the entire class.

=== Post-1948 (nationalisation) ===
The class was given the BR Power Classification of 4P5F. Livery immediately after Nationalisation was transitional, with 'British Railways' on the tender in Southern Yellow. Numbers were initially given an 'S' prefix. From the early 1950s the class was given the new BR mixed traffic Black with red/white lining.

The class was numbered according to the BR Standard Numbering System, given the series 30482–30491; 30521–30524; 30330–30334 (F13 rebuilds) and finally 30473–30478.

Table of withdrawals
Year	Quantity in service at start of year	Quantity withdrawn	Locomotive numbers	Notes
1955	26	2	30485/90	30485 accident damage
1956	24	1	30332	
1957	23	3	30330, 30483/87	
1958	20	2	30333–34	
1959	18	8	30335, 30473/77–78/82/84/86/88	
1960	10	1	30474	
1961	9	9	30331, 30475–76/89/91, 30521–30524	
