= LSWR G14 class =

LSWR/SR G14 class
Type and origin
- Power type: Steam
- Designer: Dugald Drummond
- Builder: LSWR Nine Elms Works
- Build date: 1908
- Total produced: 5
Specifications
- Configuration
  - Whyte: 4-6-0
  - UIC: 2'Cn
- Gauge: 4 ft 8 1/2 in (1,435 mm)
- Leading dia.: 3 ft 7 in (1.092 m)
- Driver dia.: 6 ft 0 in (1.829 m)
- Loco weight: 70.95 long tons (72.1 t)
- Tender weight: 49.00 long tons (49.8 t)
- Fuel type: Coal
- Fuel capacity: 4 long tons (4.1 t)
- Water cap.: 4,500 imp gal (20,000 L)
- Firebox
  - Grate area: 31.5 sq ft (2.93 m^{2})
- Boiler pressure: 200 psi (1.38 MPa)
- Cylinders: Four
- Cylinder size: 15 in × 26 in (380 mm × 660 mm)
Performance figures
- Tractive effort: 24,192 lbf (107.61 kN)
Career
- Operators: London and South Western Railway, Southern Railway
- Numbers: 453–457
- Locale: Great Britain
- Retired: 1925
- Disposition: All rebuilt to N15 class

The LSWR G14 class was a class of 4-6-0 locomotive designed by Dugald Drummond for the London and South Western Railway.

== Background ==
The continuing need to improve upon Drummond's first two 4-6-0 classes meant testing out a new design based on their failures. The LSWR's immediate traffic needs could not be covered by the relatively unsuccessful E14 class of 1907, and the first Drummond 4-6-0 – the F13 class of 1905 – had been withdrawn from the heavy passenger services they were designed to undertake, as they would not 'run' and were heavy on coal, water and man-hours in terms of upkeep. However the problem of continually accelerating timetables to the South Coast ports remained, and any further engines of the E14 class could not be relied upon to uphold the heavy passenger services alone.

It was still clear that another 4-6-0 design was needed to bolster the strength of heavy express passenger locomotives available to the LSWR's operating department. Their proven ability to pull heavy trains at faster speeds and their inherently better power-to-weight ratio on other lines made Drummond decide to continue with the concept. He also retained the four-cylinder layout, resulting in what became the G14 class.

== Construction history ==
Drummond decided to continue his development of the 4-6-0 wheel arrangement in anticipation of further increases in the speed and length of trains, a concept with many advantages that he incorporated in his third design of this type. A 175 psi (1.21 MPa) saturated boiler, somewhat smaller than on the F13/E14 classes, was utilised to power the four-cylinder front end.

The new design was equipped with inside and outside sets of Walschaerts valve gear, therefore reducing the mechanical complexity that had plagued his previous designs, and these powered 6 ft (1.8 m) wheels. This factor also meant a slightly lighter axle-loading compared to the mixed Stephenson/Walschaerts F13 class. Large single splashers that covered the wheels were also implemented, though these would prove troublesome in service. The Drummond 'watercart' eight-wheeled tender was utilised for the long journeys on the LSWR mainline. Full-scale construction was undertaken at Nine Elms, with the first of five G14s being outshopped in 1908.

Year	Order	Quantity	LSWR numbers	Notes
1908	G14	5	453–457	

=== Rebuilding under Maunsell ===
After 17 years in both primary and secondary passenger duties, Richard Maunsell, who became Chief Mechanical Engineer of the newly formed Southern Railway in 1923, decided that as the class did not conform with the general standardization of Southern locomotive classes it should be withdrawn. The G14s were reduced to kits of parts, some of which may have been utilised in creating a further batch of N15 (King Arthur Class) locomotives.

== Livery and numbering ==
Under the LSWR, the G14s were outshopped in the LSWR Passenger Royal Green livery with purple-brown edging, creating panels of green. This was further lined in white and black with 'LSWR' in gilt on the tender tank sides.

When transferred to Southern Railway ownership after 1923, the locomotives were outshopped in Richard Maunsell's darker version of the LSWR livery. The LSWR standard gilt lettering was changed to yellow with 'Southern' on the water tank sides. The locomotives also featured black and white lining.

== Operational details ==
The G14 design was originally intended to operate expresses between Salisbury and Exeter, and were considered more successful than their F13 and E14 predecessors. However, the class still had most of the drawbacks associated with Drummond 4-6-0s in terms of high water and coal consumption.

The G14s continued in their original state without modification until they were withdrawn in 1925 by Richard Maunsell, who put their watercart tenders and numbers to use in new N15 class locomotives. All members of the class were scrapped.
