= LSWR E14 class =

LSWR/SR E14
Type and origin
- Power type: Steam
- Designer: Dugald Drummond
- Builder: LSWR Nine Elms Works
- Build date: 1907
- Total produced: 1
Specifications
- Configuration
  - Whyte: 4-6-0
- Gauge: 4 ft 8 1/2 in (1,435 mm)
- Leading dia.: 3 ft 7 in (1.092 m)
- Driver dia.: 6 ft 0 in (1.829 m)
- Loco weight: 76 long tons 13 cwt (171,700 lb or 77.9 t)
- Fuel type: Coal
- Fuel capacity: 5 long tons (5.1 t; 5.6 short tons)
- Water cap.: 5,800 imp gal (26,000 L)
- Boiler pressure: 175 psi (1.21 MPa)
- Cylinders: Four
- Cylinder size: 16 1/2 in × 26 in (420 mm × 660 mm)
Performance figures
- Tractive effort: 29,248 lbf (130.10 kN)
Career
- Operators: London and South Western Railway
- Class: E14
- Nicknames: The Turkey
- Locale: Great Britain
- Retired: 1914
- Disposition: Rebuilt to H15 class

The LSWR E14 Class was a class of 4-6-0 locomotive designed by Dugald Drummond for the London and South Western Railway.

== Background ==
Drummond's 4-6-0 F13 class had been withdrawn from the heavy boat train services they were designed to undertake, as they were heavy on coal and water and man-hours in terms of upkeep.. The LSWRs immediate traffic needs were adequately covered by their 4-4-0 designs, however, the problem of continually accelerating timetables to the South Coast ports remained.

It was clear that another design was needed due to their faster speeds and inherent power-to-weight ratio., as well as the LSWR's passenger requirements needing longer, heavier rolling stock to keep maintain faster point-to-point schedules.

== Construction history ==
Drummond again settled on the 4-6-0 wheel arrangement in anticipation of longer and faster trains in the future. A 175 psi (1,210 kPa) saturated boiler was utilised, able to maintain the steam needed for four simple-expansion cylinders and 6 ft 0 in (1.83 m) driving wheels, an improvement over the F13 class. The class was equipped with Walschaerts valve gear for both inside and outside the frames, therefore simplifying the design in respect to maintenance and overhauls. While Drummond had been given authorisation to build five, only a single E14 class was built.

Year	Batch	Quantity	LSWR numbers	Notes
1907	E14	1	335	

== Livery and numbering ==
Under the LSWR, the E14 was painted in LSWR Passenger Sage Green livery with purple-brown edging, creating panels of green. This was further lined in white and black with 'LSWR' in gilt on the tender tank sides.

== Operational details ==
The E14 was originally intended for expresses between Salisbury and Exeter, but were unsuccessful and only ran them for one year. It saw more success on the less-difficult coal trains between Salisbury and Southampton. The E14 had a high coal consumption and was nicknamed the "Turkey" as a result.

=== Rebuilding under Urie ===
Drummond withdrew the E14 for major modifications after only five years due to poor operational performance. Drummond died in 1912 before this could happen, and the rebuilding was done by his successor Robert Urie, who rebuilt the locomotive as the eleventh member of his H15 class in 1914.
