= Robert Urie =

Scottish locomotive engineer

Robert W. Urie
- Born: 22 October 1854; Ardeer, Ayrshire, Scotland
- Died: 6 January 1937 (aged 82); Largs, Ayrshire, Scotland
- Engineering career
- Discipline: Mechanical and Locomotive
- Employer(s): Caledonian Railway, London and South Western Railway
- Significant design: LSWR H15, N15, and S15 classes, 'Eastleigh' superheater

Robert Wallace Urie (22 October 1854 – 6 January 1937) was a Scottish locomotive engineer who was the last chief mechanical engineer of the London and South Western Railway.

== Career ==
After serving an apprenticeship with and working for various private locomotive manufacturers he joined the Caledonian Railway in 1890, and became chief draughtsman, and later Works Manager at St. Rollox railway works under Dugald Drummond. In 1897 he moved with Drummond to join the London and South Western Railway (LSWR) as works manager at Nine Elms in London. He transferred to the new works at Eastleigh in 1909. Following the death of Dugald Drummond in 1912, Urie became chief mechanical engineer until his own retirement at the grouping of 1923.

== Locomotive designs ==
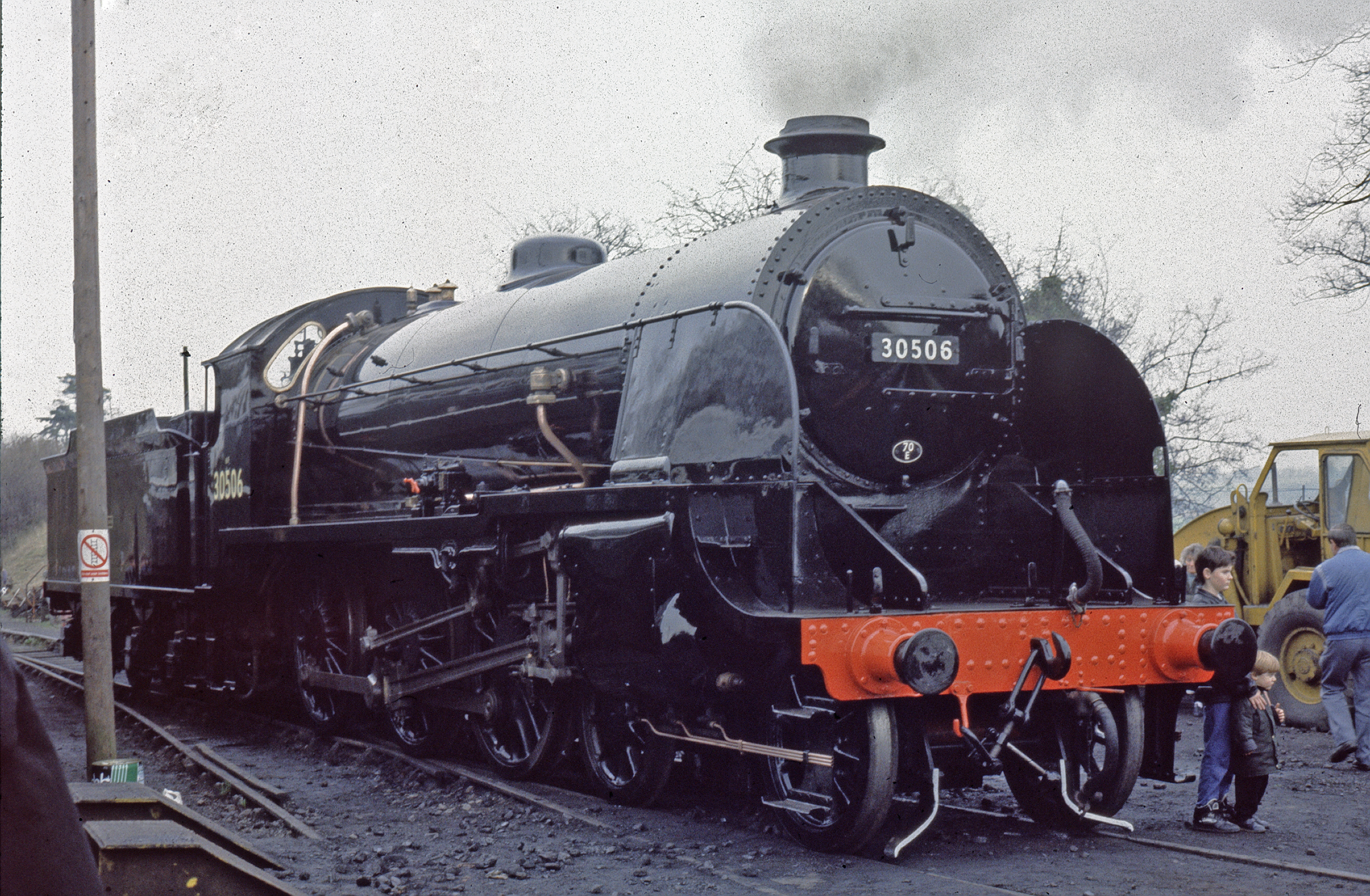
Preserved S15 class 4-6-0 freight locomotive No. 506 (as BR 30506) at Ropley on the Mid-Hants Railway as of 1993

Robert Urie made a significant contribution to the development of more powerful express passenger and goods locomotives for use on the London and South Western Railway main line, with simple yet robust designs. In particular his LSWR H15 class, LSWR N15 class and LSWR S15 class 4-6-0 as well LSWR Class G16 4-8-0T and LSWR H16 class 4-6-2T locomotives continued to be built by the Southern Railway under Richard Maunsell's direction.

== Patents ==
- GB191410781, published 13 August 1914, Improvements in means for connecting pipes or conduits
- GB191410782, published 3 September 1914, Improvements in steam superheaters

== Family ==
His son David Chalmers Urie was a locomotive engineer with the Highland Railway and later the London, Midland and Scottish Railway.

Business positions
| Preceded by Dugald Drummond | Chief Mechanical Engineer of the London and South Western Railway; 1912–1922 | Post abolished Company merged into the Southern Railway |
