= LSWR F13 class =

LSWR/SR F13
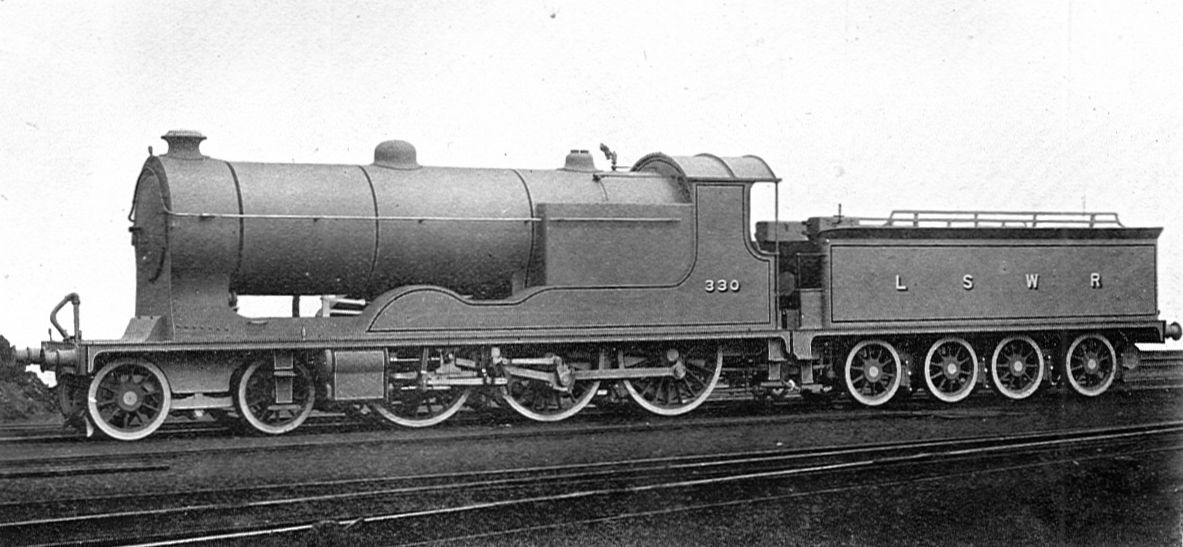
- F13 class 330, circa. 1907
Type and origin
- Power type: Steam
- Designer: Dugald Drummond
- Builder: LSWR Nine Elms Works
- Build date: 1905
- Total produced: 5
Specifications
- Configuration
  - Whyte: 4-6-0
- Gauge: 4 ft 8 1/2 in (1,435 mm)
- Leading dia.: 3 ft 7 in (1.092 m)
- Driver dia.: 6 ft 0 in (1.829 m)
- Length: 63 ft 11 in (19.48 m)
- Loco weight: 76.65 long tons (77.88 t; 85.85 short tons)
- Fuel type: Coal
- Fuel capacity: 5 long tons (5.1 t; 5.6 short tons)
- Water cap.: 5,800 imp gal (26,000 L)
- Boiler pressure: 175 psi (1.21 MPa)
- Cylinders: Four
- Cylinder size: 16 in × 24 in (410 mm × 610 mm)
- Valve gear: Stephenson (inside); Walschaerts (outside)
Performance figures
- Tractive effort: 25,387 lbf (112.93 kN)
Career
- Operators: London and South Western Railway, Southern Railway
- Class: F13
- Locale: Great Britain
- Retired: 1924
- Disposition: All rebuilt to H15 class

The London and South Western Railway F13 class was a class of 4-6-0 locomotives designed by Dugald Drummond for the London and South Western Railway (LSWR).

== Background ==
Whilst Dugald Drummond's success with his previous 4-4-0 designs meant that the LSWR's immediate traffic needs were covered in 1905, he began to undertake a new project that would help solve a new problem. This problem rested in fact that the timetables were continually accelerated because of this success, especially in the case of boat trains to the South Coast ports.

It soon became clear that faster passenger locomotives with a better power-to-weight ratio than the 4-4-0 designs were needed, in order to keep pace with the LSWR's passenger requirements increasing due to lengthened, heavier rolling stock that needed to keep up with faster point-to-point schedules.

As a result, Drummond believed that a new wheel arrangement (for the LSWR) was required in order to support such power, which in turn was provided by a multiple-cylinder layout. The resultant design was to become the F13 Class.

== Construction history ==
Drummond had settled on the 4-6-0 wheel arrangement in anticipation of further increases in speed and length of trains, a concept that had many advantages. A longer, larger boiler could therefore be utilised, therefore generating the steam needed to power a four-cylinder front end, and 6 feet 0 inches (1.829 m) wheels were utilised. In terms of the cylinder arrangement, Drummond's first 4-6-0 locomotive design was highly unusual.

The new design was equipped with Stephenson valve gear for the inside cylinders and Walschaerts valve gear for the outside, therefore creating an overly complex design in respect to spare parts required during overhauls. This factor also created a heavy locomotive, though route availability was not a high consideration in terms of their intended role to ply their trade on the LSWR mainline.

Full-scale construction was undertaken at Nine Elms, with the first of five F13s being outshopped in 1905, and the class was married to a Drummond 'watercart' eight-wheeled tender in an attempt to provide adequate provision of coal and water for long journeys.

Year	Batch	Quantity	LSWR numbers	Notes
1905	F13	5	330–334	

== Livery and numbering ==
Under the LSWR, the F13s were outshopped in the LSWR Passenger Sage Green livery with purple-brown edging, creating panels of green. This was further lined in white and black with 'LSWR' in gilt on the tender tank sides.

When transferred to Southern Railway ownership after 1923, the locomotives were outshopped in Richard Maunsell's darker version of the LSWR livery. The LSWR standard gilt lettering was changed to yellow with 'Southern' on the water tank sides. The locomotives also featured black and white lining.

== Operational details ==
The F13 design had originally been intended to operate expresses between Salisbury and Exeter, but were unsuccessful resulting in their operation lasting only a year. The class saw more success when rostered to operate on the less arduous stretch of track between Salisbury and Southampton, hauling coal trains between these two destinations, a far cry from their intended role.

One, number 333 was fitted with an Eastleigh superheater in 1920, but the class was deemed a failure and withdrawn in 1924, although the 334 had been laid aside since the end of 1921. All were rebuilt by Richard Maunsell into H15 class 4-6-0s.
