= LSWR K10 class =

LSWR/SR K10
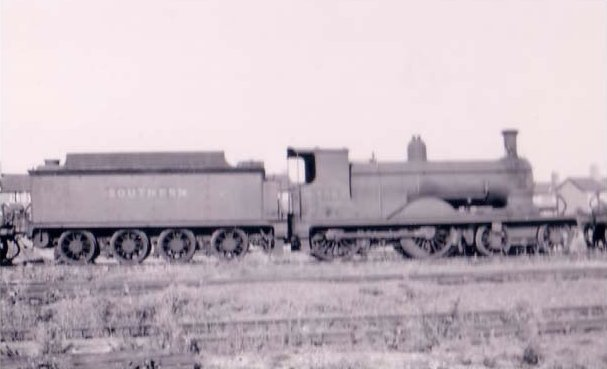
- K10 number 386 at Eastleigh, 1950
Type and origin
- Power type: Steam
- Designer: Dugald Drummond
- Builder: LSWR Nine Elms Works
- Build date: 1901-1902
- Total produced: 40
Specifications
- Configuration
  - Whyte: 4-4-0
- Gauge: 4 ft 8 1/2 in (1,435 mm) standard gauge
- Leading dia.: 3 ft 7 in (1.092 m)
- Driver dia.: 5 ft 7 in (1.702 m)
- Length: ? ft ? in (? m)
- Loco weight: 46 long tons 14 cwt (104,600 lb or 47.4 t)
- Fuel type: Coal
- Fuel capacity: 5 long tons 0 cwt (11,200 lb or 5.1 t)
- Water cap.: 4,000 imp gal (18,000 L; 4,800 US gal)
- Boiler pressure: 175 lbf/in^{2} (1,210 kPa; 12.3 kgf/cm^{2})
- Cylinders: Two, inside
- Cylinder size: 18 1/2 in × 26 in (470 mm × 660 mm)
Performance figures
- Tractive effort: 19,755 lbf (87,870 N)
Career
- Operators: London and South Western Railway, Southern Railway, British Railways
- Power class: LSWR/SR: F BR: 1MT
- Locale: Great Britain
- Withdrawn: 1947–1951
- Disposition: All scrapped

The London and South Western Railway K10 Class was a class of 40 4-4-0 steam locomotives designed for mixed traffic work. They were introduced on the London and South Western Railway in 1901 and 1902 to the design of Dugald Drummond, where they earned the nickname "Small Hoppers".

== Background ==
In order to satisfy a pressing requirement for mixed-traffic locomotives, Drummond adopted the solution of a small-wheeled 4-4-0 he had previously employed on the Caledonian Railway. The resulting K10 had the same 5 ft 7 in (1.702 m) diameter coupled wheels as the M7 and the boiler was interchangeable with the M7, 700 and C8 classes

== Construction history ==
Forty of the class were subsequently outshopped from the LSWR's Nine Elms Locomotive Works. They were generally paired with a 6-wheel tender because of their intended short journey lengths, which included local stopping trains and medium-level freight haulage, but as with the later L11 class, some could occasionally be seen with a 4,000-imperial-gallon (18,000 L; 4,800 US gal) "watercart" tender for longer trips.

Table of orders and numbers
Year	Batch	Quantity	LSWR numbers	Notes
1901	K10	5	329, 340–343	
1902	L10	5	344–345, 347, 393–394	
1902	P10	5	380–384	
1902	S10	5	385–389	
1902	V10	5	135–136, 390–392	
1902	A11	5	137–141	
1902	C11	5	142–146	
1902	E11	5	149–153	

== Livery and numbering ==
=== LSWR and Southern ===
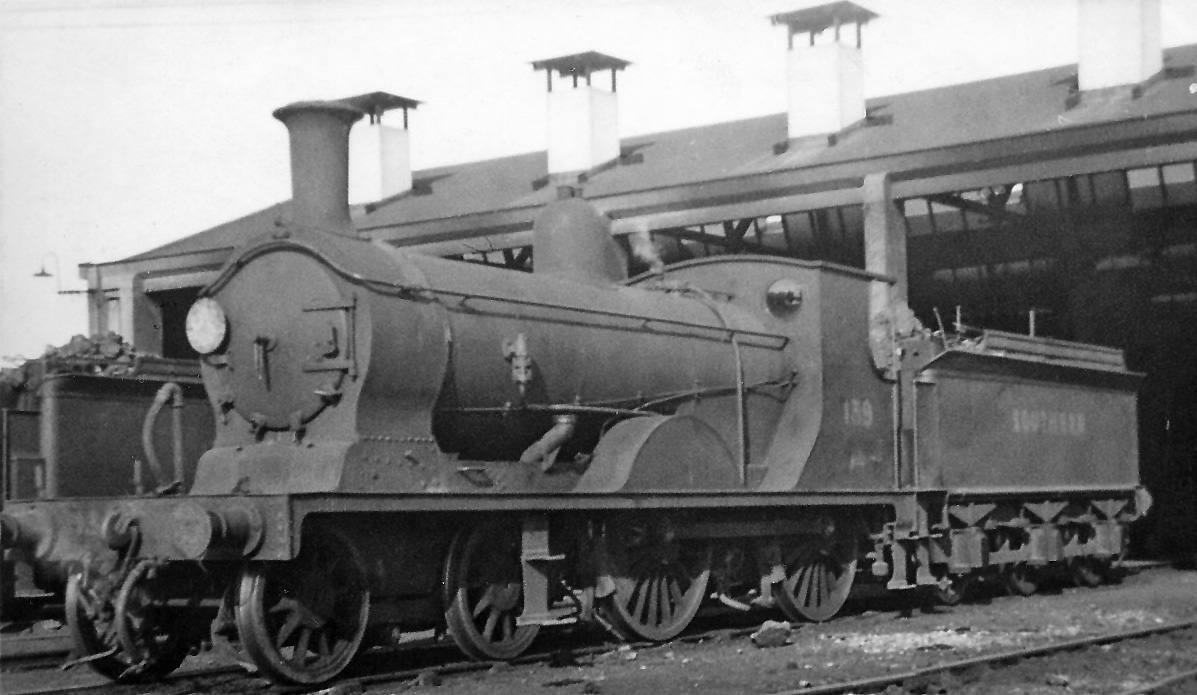
No.139 at Feltham 1947

Livery under the LSWR was Drummond's LSWR Passenger Sage Green, with purple-brown edging and black and white lining. Under Southern Railway ownership from grouping in 1923, the locomotives were outshopped in Richard Maunsell's darker version of the LSWR Sage Green with yellow lettering on the tender, with black and white lining. This livery was continued under Oliver Bulleid despite his experimentations with Malachite green, though the 'Southern' lettering on the tender was changed to the 'Sunshine Yellow' style. During the Second World War, members of the class outshopped form overhaul were turned out in wartime black. The class was haphazardly numbered by the LSWR. Numbering under the Southern retained the LSWR allocations.

=== Post-1948 (nationalisation) ===
In 1947 nos.136/8/49 & nos.342/4/7/81/7/8 were placed out of use leaving just thirty-one to enter into British Railways ownership upon nationalisation in 1948. However, with withdrawals rapidly continuing only no.381 physically received its new BR number (30381 in ‘Sunshine Yellow’ and still with ‘Southern’ on its black unlined tender). But it too was withdrawn (April 1951) before no.389 (failed July 1951) and no.384 (already condemned but serviceable to August 1951). None of the K10 class carried the Railway Executive's Standard Livery for British Railways (as published in February 1949).

== Operational details ==
The class shared the same inability to sustain their power over long distances as the C8s, leading to the K10s being employed only on occasional main line trips over short distances. The class therefore gained the nickname of "Small Hoppers" from their crews. The aforementioned defect was not a hindrance, with the class leading an admirable career on secondary routes. Due to the LSWR being primarily a passenger railway, there were few heavy goods services that would have proved too much for the design despite its flaws.

Table of withdrawals
Year	Quantity in service at start of year	Quantity withdrawn	Locomotive numbers	Notes
1947	40	9	136/138/149, 342/344/347/381/387–388	
1948	31	8	139/143/145–146/150/340/343/392	
1949	23	15	(30)135/137/141/144/152–153, (30)341/345/380/383/385–386/391/393–394	BR numbers allocated but not carried
1950	8	5	(30)140/142/151, (30)329/390	BR numbers allocated but not carried
1951	3	3	30382, (30)384/389	30382 was the only K10 to physically carry its BR 30,000 series number.

== Comparison with L11 ==
According to Dendy Marshall, the main differences between the K10 "Small Hoppers" and the L11 "Large Hoppers" were:

- K10, 9-foot (2.743 m) coupling rods and C8 type boiler
- L11, 10-foot (3.048 m) coupling rods and T9 type boiler

== Preservation ==
None have been preserved.
