= LSWR L12 class =

LSWR/SR L12
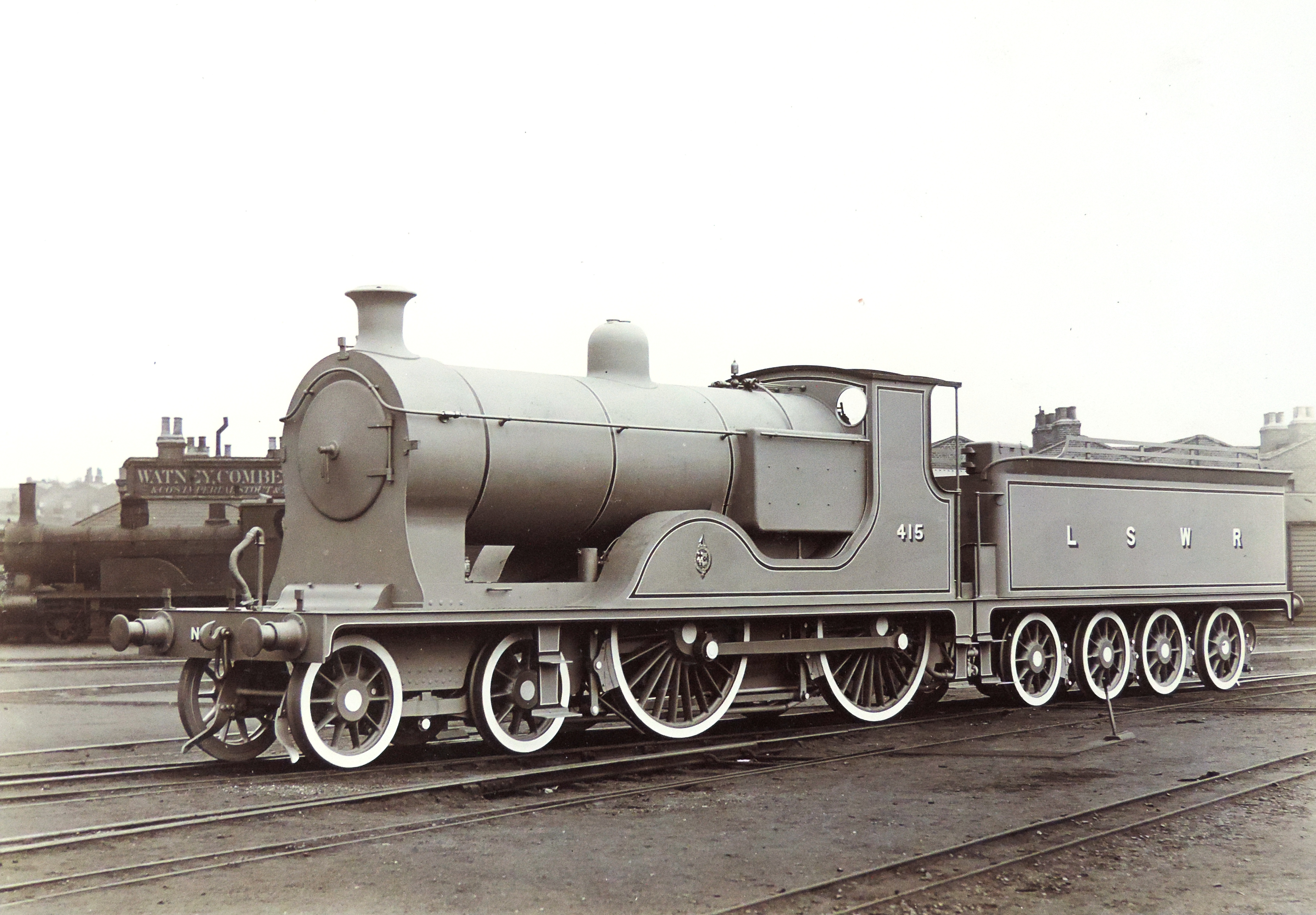
- 415 when new
Type and origin
- Power type: Steam
- Designer: Dugald Drummond
- Builder: LSWR Nine Elms Works
- Build date: 1904–1905
- Total produced: 20
Specifications
- Configuration
  - Whyte: 4-4-0
- Gauge: 4 ft 8 1/2 in (1,435 mm) standard gauge
- Leading dia.: 3 ft 7 in (1.092 m)
- Driver dia.: 6 ft 7 in (2.007 m)
- Length: 63 ft 9 in (19.43 m)
- Loco weight: 54 long tons 4 cwt (121,400 lb or 55.1 t) (orig); 55 long tons 5 cwt (123,800 lb or 56.1 t) (superheated)
- Fuel type: Coal
- Boiler pressure: 175 lbf/in^{2} (1.21 MPa)
- Cylinders: Two, inside
- Cylinder size: 19 in × 26 in (483 mm × 660 mm)
Performance figures
- Tractive effort: 17,673 lbf (78.61 kN)
Career
- Operators: London and South Western Railway, Southern Railway, British Railways
- Class: LSWR / SR: L12
- Power class: LSWR / SR: D BR: 2P, later 3P
- Locale: Southern Region
- Withdrawn: 1951–1955
- Disposition: All scrapped

The London and South Western Railway L12 class was a class of 20 4-4-0 steam locomotives designed for express passenger work by Dugald Drummond. They were introduced to the London and South Western Railway network in 1904. Despite the class being an unremarkable continuation of the Drummond lineage, one member was involved in the infamous Salisbury rail crash in June 1906. None of the class survived into preservation after their brief career in British Railways ownership.

== Background ==
In 1904, the LSWR Locomotive Superintendent, Dugald Drummond, was tasked by his superiors to analyse the possibility of an updated version of his successful T9 class 4-4-0. With open competition against the Great Western Railway in earning revenue from ocean-going traffic in the south-west of England at Plymouth, there was a need for a new design of powerful locomotive capable of hauling heavy loads at high speeds. This furthermore provided Drummond with the chance to take advantage of various advances in locomotive technology that had accumulated in the five years since the release of the T9.

== Construction history ==
The last in an unbroken lineage of Drummond 4-4-0s stretching back to his unsuccessful C8 Class of 1898, the L12 continued the tradition of solid construction and robust operation.

Drummond took the decision to construct a further new class of 20 4-4-0s as part of the competition between the LSWR and GWR regarding boat trains to Plymouth harbour. Once again, the L12 followed the example of the Class S11 in incorporating the same frames as the T9. The major design difference between this and the Class S11 was that the 6-foot-7-inch (2.007 m) driving wheels seen on the T9 were reinstated for fast running on the LSWR main line.

The boiler was also similar to that of the T9s, capped off with a dome and stovepipe chimney, though the smokebox was of a smaller design in comparison due to the initial lack of superheating. The locomotive was fitted with cross-water tubes fitted into the firebox, as featured on the T9 Class. This was an attempt to increase the heat surface area of the water, which was achieved, though at a cost in boiler complexity. The new locomotive had a higher centre of gravity than the earlier T9 class, which would cause the locomotive to become unbalanced on curves at speed, and this would have fatal consequences later on.

One major modification was made by Robert Urie, who exchanged the saturated steam boilers for the superheated variety, resulting in an enlarged smokebox when compared to that fitted on the S11 Class. At the same time, the addition of the superheater header and associated tubes meant that the overall weight was increased by one long ton (1.02 t; 1.12 short tons) from 86 to 87 long tons (87.4 to 88.4 t; 96.3 to 97.4 short tons).

Production of the class began at Nine Elms in 1904, with all members of the class were fitted with the Drummond "watercart" eight-wheel tender for longer running on the LSWR network.

Year	Batch	Quantity	LSWR numbers	Notes
1904	L12	5	415–419	
1904	O12	5	420–424	
1904	R12	5	425–429	
1905	T12	5	430–434	

== Operational details ==
The class gained the nickname "Bulldogs" from their crews due to their 'butch' appearance. The L12s were initially rostered to Nine Elms, Bournemouth and Salisbury, where they worked the LSWR system on express passenger trains..

The class was later also shedded at Exmouth Junction where they shared the Ocean Liner special expresses to and from Plymouth with the S11 class. Although the class was relatively well-received by locomotive crews, there was no discernible improvement over the T9s it was supposed to develop from, and as such, led uneventful careers after the accident of 1906. They began to be withdrawn soon after Nationalisation in 1948, by which time the class were used for local freight working on rural lines. The last of the class was withdrawn from Guildford shed in 1955, ending its life on pick-up/set down goods trains on the Meon Valley Railway. None survived for preservation.

== Accidents and incidents ==
It was at Salisbury that the class gained an infamous reputation, as number 421 was involved in the Salisbury high speed derailment of 1 July 1906, which resulted in twenty-eight fatalities and eleven injuries. 421 was one of two locomotives hauling a boat train to London Waterloo from Plymouth, which failed to round a curve at the eastern end of Salisbury station and subsequently derailed. The resultant inquiry into the incident ended the ruthless competition between the LSWR and GWR for Plymouth boat traffic.

== Livery and numbering ==
=== LSWR and Southern ===
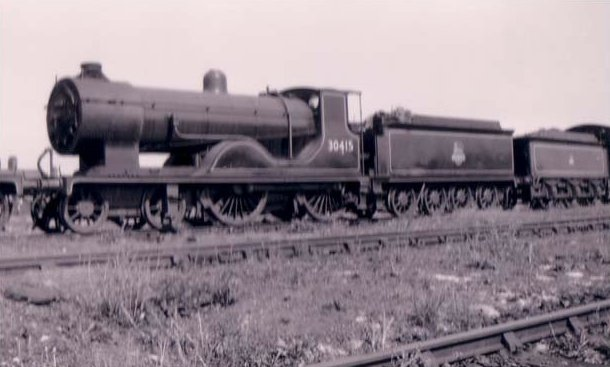
30415 at Eastleigh, 1950

Under the LSWR, the locomotives were outshopped in the LSWR Passenger Sage Green livery with purple-brown edging, creating panels of green. This was further lined in white and black with 'LSWR' in gilt on the tender tank sides.

When transferred to Southern Railway ownership after 1923, the locomotives were outshopped in Richard Maunsell's darker version of the LSWR livery. The LSWR standard gilt lettering was changed to yellow with 'Southern' on the water tank sides. The locomotives also featured black and white lining.

However, despite Bulleid's experimentation with Malachite Green livery on express passenger locomotives, the Maunsell livery was continued with the S11s, though the 'Southern' lettering on the tender was changed to the 'Sunshine Yellow' style. During the Second World War, members of the class outshopped from overhaul were turned out in wartime black, and some of the class retained this livery to Nationalisation.

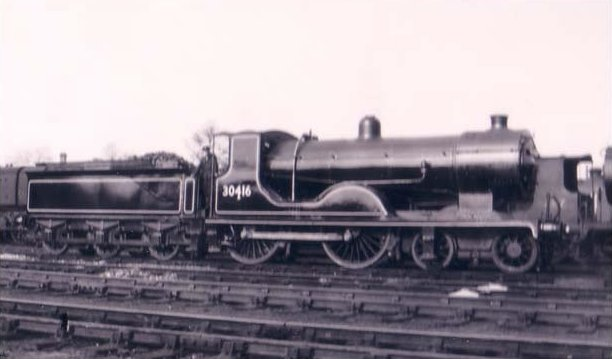
30416 at Eastleigh in 1949.

Table of withdrawals
Year	Quantity in service at start of year	Quantity withdrawn	Locomotive numbers	Notes
1951	20	18	30416–33	
1952	2	0	–	
1953	2	1	30415	
1954	1	0	–	
1955	1	1	30434	

=== Post-1948 (nationalisation) ===
Livery after Nationalisation was initially Southern Wartime Black livery with 'British Railways' on the tender, and an 'S' prefix on the number, until superseded by the Standard BR 30xxx series. Latterly, the class was outshopped in BR Mixed Traffic Black livery, with red and white lining. The BR crest was placed on the tender tank sides.
