= LSWR L11 class =

British steam locomotive class (1903)

LSWR/SR L11
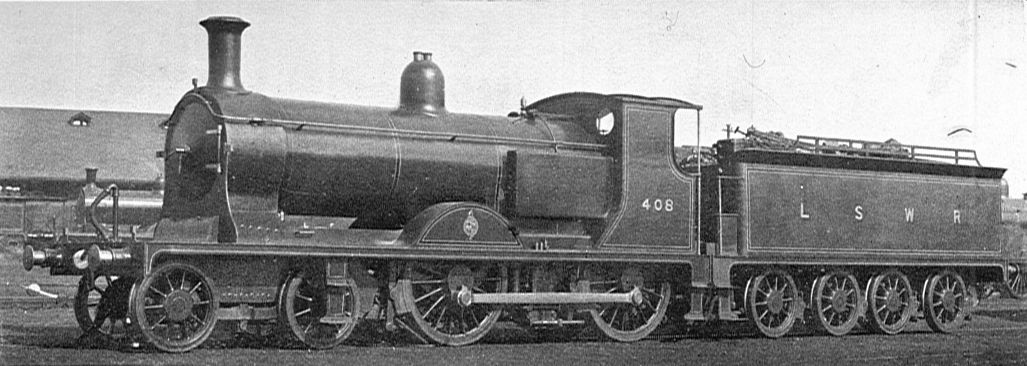
- L11 408 with the original watertube firebox, ca. 1907
Type and origin
- Power type: Steam
- Designer: Dugald Drummond
- Builder: LSWR Nine Elms Works
- Build date: 1903–1907
- Total produced: 40
Specifications
- Configuration
  - Whyte: 4-4-0
- Gauge: 4 ft 8 1/2 in (1,435 mm) standard gauge
- Leading dia.: 3 ft 7 in (1.092 m)
- Driver dia.: 5 ft 7 in (1.702 m)
- Loco weight: 50 long tons 11 cwt (113,200 lb or 51.4 t)
- Fuel type: Coal
- Fuel capacity: 4 long tons 0 cwt (9,000 lb or 4.1 t)
- Water cap.: 3,500 imp gal (16,000 L; 4,200 US gal)
- Boiler pressure: 175 lbf/in^{2} (1.21 MPa)
- Cylinders: Two, inside
- Cylinder size: 18 1/2 in × 26 in (470 mm × 660 mm)
- Valve gear: Stephenson
Performance figures
- Tractive effort: 19,796 lbf (88.06 kN)
Career
- Operators: London and South Western Railway, Southern Railway, British Railways
- Class: LSWR / SR: L11
- Power class: LSWR / SR: F BR: 1MT
- Nicknames: Large Hopper
- Locale: Southern Region
- Withdrawn: 1949–1952
- Disposition: All scrapped

The London and South Western Railway L11 class was a class of 4-4-0 steam locomotives designed for mixed traffic work. They were introduced in 1903 and were nicknamed "Large Hoppers". As with most other Drummond productions, the locomotive had two inside cylinders and Stephenson link valve gear.

== Background ==
The L11 class was one of a number of designs by Dugald Drummond incorporating a large proportion of standard parts that could be interchanged with other classes of locomotive. The boiler was interchangeable with the T9 class, and likewise was equipped with water tubes fitted across the firebox combustion space, with the aim of increasing heating surface whilst facilitating water circulation; this device however also increased maintenance costs and was soon removed by Drummond's successor, Robert Urie.

== Later history ==
The L11 class was never equipped with a superheater as was applied to other Drummond types. The class was coupled to a six-wheeled tender as standard, although from time to time they had the Drummond eight-wheeled 'watercart' by way of tender interchange. Eight locomotives were converted to oil firing as part of government trials in 1947 to 1948.

No examples have been preserved.

== Construction table ==
Year	Batch	Quantity	LSWR numbers	Notes
1903	L11	5	154–158	
1903	O11	5	159, 161, 163–165	
1904	D12	5	134, 148, 166–168	
1904	F12	5	169–173	
1906	K13	5	174, 175, 407–409	
1906	M13	5	410–414	
1906	P13	5	405, 406, 435–437	
1907	S13	5	438–442	

== Livery and numbering ==
=== LSWR and Southern ===
Under the LSWR, the L11s were outshopped in the LSWR Passenger Sage Green livery with purple-brown edging, creating panels of green. This was further lined in white and black with 'LSWR' in gilt on the tender tank sides.

When transferred to Southern Railway ownership after 1923, the locomotives were outshopped in Richard Maunsell's darker version of the LSWR livery. The LSWR standard gilt lettering was changed to yellow with 'Southern' on the water tank sides. The locomotives also featured black and white lining.

=== Post-1948 (nationalisation) ===
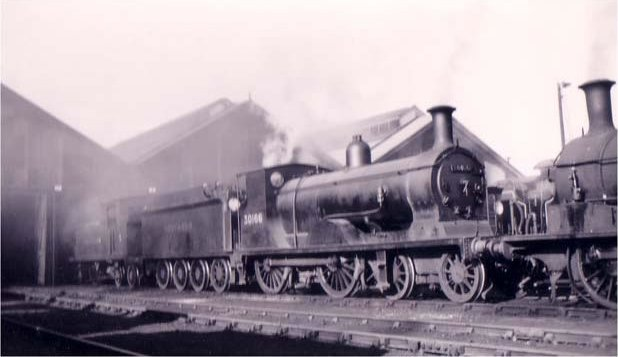
BR No. 30166 pictured on shed

Livery after Nationalisation was initially Southern freight livery with 'British Railways' on the tender, and an 'S' prefix on the number. The class was subsequently outshopped in BR Mixed Traffic Black with red and white lining, with the BR crest on the tender.

Locomotive numbering was per BR standard practice, with 40 locomotives passing into British Railways ownership in 1948 and they were numbered randomly (with other LSWR classes) in the ranges 30134-30175, 30405-30414, 30435-30442. Numbering was based upon the batches built. However, thirteen of the locomotives had been withdrawn by the end of 1948, resulting in gaps in the sequence.

Table of withdrawals
Year	Quantity in service at start of year	Quantity withdrawn	Locomotive numbers	Notes
1949	40	6	30167/69, 30410/35/39–40	
1950	34	6	30158/61/66/68, 30407/12	
1951	28	22	30134/54–56/59/63–65/71/73–75, 30405–06/08–09/13–14/36/38/41–42	
1952	6	6	30148/57/70/72, 30411/37	

== Comparison with K10 ==
According to Dendy Marshall, the main differences between the K10 "Small Hoppers" and the L11 "Large Hoppers" were:

- K10, 9 foot coupling rods and C8 type boiler
- L11, 10 foot coupling rods and T9 type boiler
