= J33 =

J33 may refer to:

- Allison J33, a turbojet engine
- de Havilland J 33 Venom, a British fighter in service with the Swedish Air Force
- Ground Equipment Facility J-33, a former radar station in California
- LNER Class J33, a British steam locomotive class
- Malaysia Federal Route J33
- Nasal polyp
- Pentagonal gyrocupolarotunda, a Johnson solid (J_{33})
- Small nucleolar RNA J33
