= 1906 Salisbury rail crash =

1906 train derailment in England

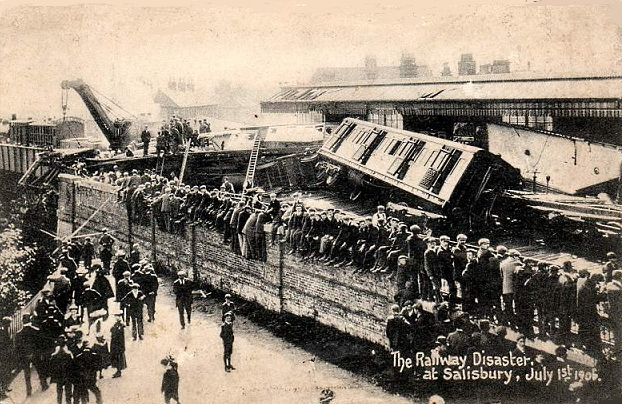

Details
- Date: 1 July 1906; 1:57 am
- Location: Salisbury railway station, Wiltshire, England
- Coordinates: 51.0708°N 1.8042°W
- Country: England
- Line: West of England Main Line
- Operator: London and South Western Railway
- Cause: Overspeed on curve

Statistics
- Trains: 3
- Passengers: 43
- Deaths: 28
- Injured: 11

The Salisbury rail crash was a high-speed rail accident which occurred at the Salisbury railway station, Wiltshire, England, on 1 July 1906. A boat train from Plymouth to London failed to negotiate a sharp bend at more than twice the speed limit and crashed into another train, killing 28 people. Much speculation remains as to its cause.

== Incident ==
The London and South Western Railway (LSWR) boat train from Devonport Stonehouse Pool to London Waterloo failed to navigate a very sharp curve at the eastern end of Salisbury station. The curve had a maximum permitted speed of 30 miles per hour (48 km/h), but the express had been travelling at more than 70 miles per hour (110 km/h). The train was completely derailed and smashed into a milk train and a light engine, killing 28 people including the driver and two firemen.

The crash occurred around the time that a short cut for the rival Great Western Railway was opening, and it was claimed that the driver of the crashed train was trying to show that his railway was capable of competitive speeds. It was also rumoured that passengers – mostly rich New Yorkers travelling to London from the transatlantic port at Plymouth – had bribed the driver to run the train as fast as possible, but there was no evidence of this and, if anything, the train had lost time earlier. Conversely, it was stated that drivers often ran through Salisbury very fast to "get a run" at the following hill.

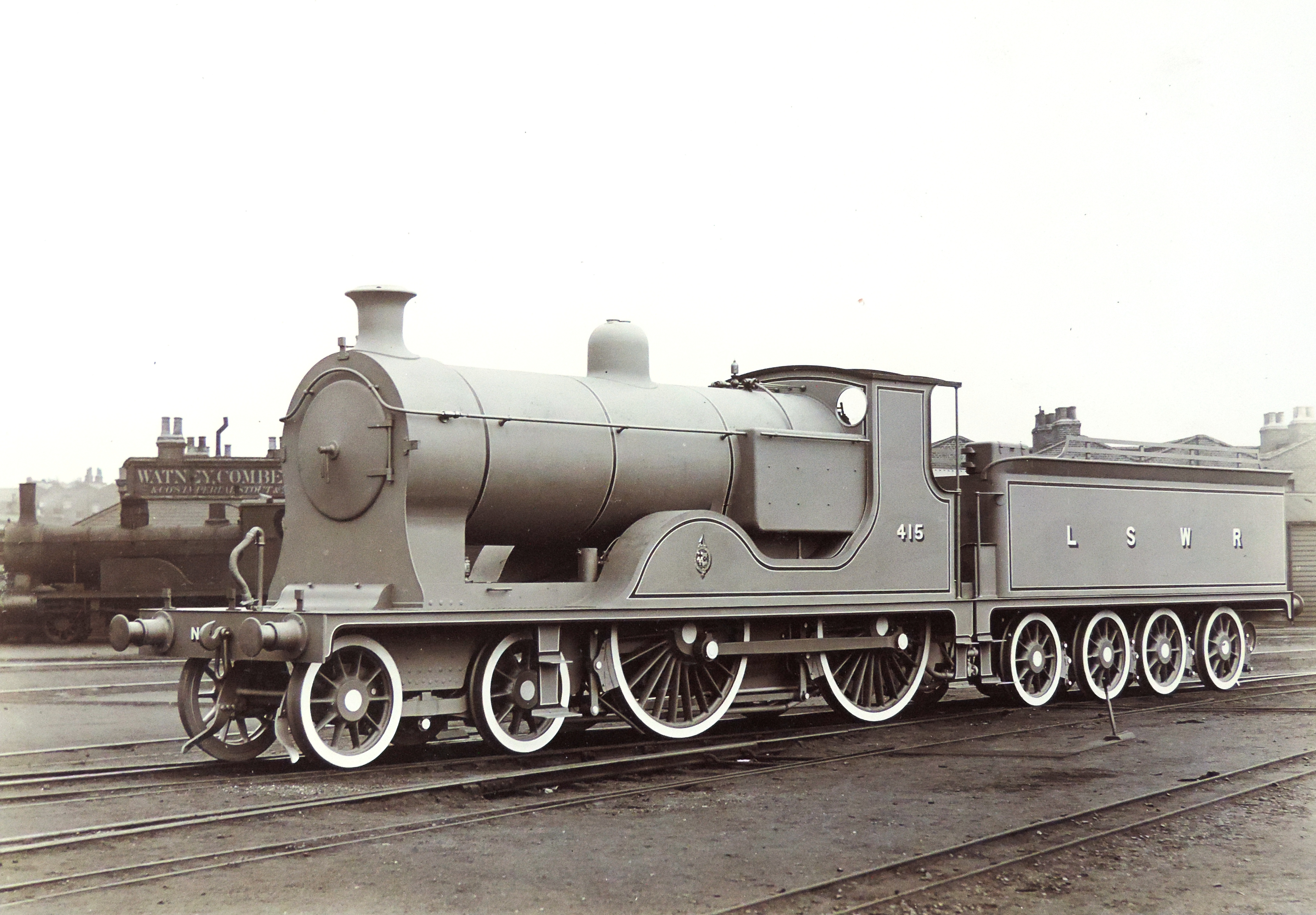
LSWR L12 class 4-4-0 No. 415, similar to the crashed engine

The crashed train's engine was a new LSWR L12 class 4-4-0 No. 421 with a higher centre of gravity than the earlier T9 class. The most likely cause of the accident is that the driver did not realise the level of risk he was running, particularly as this was the first time he had taken a non-stopping train through Salisbury. Steam locomotives at this time, and for half a century afterwards, were not fitted with speedometers.

Prior to the crash the boat train had no passenger stops between Plymouth and Waterloo, just a locomotive change at Templecombe. As a result of the accident all trains were required to stop at Salisbury station, and the speed limit on the curve east of Salisbury was reduced to 15 miles per hour (24 km/h), still in effect today.

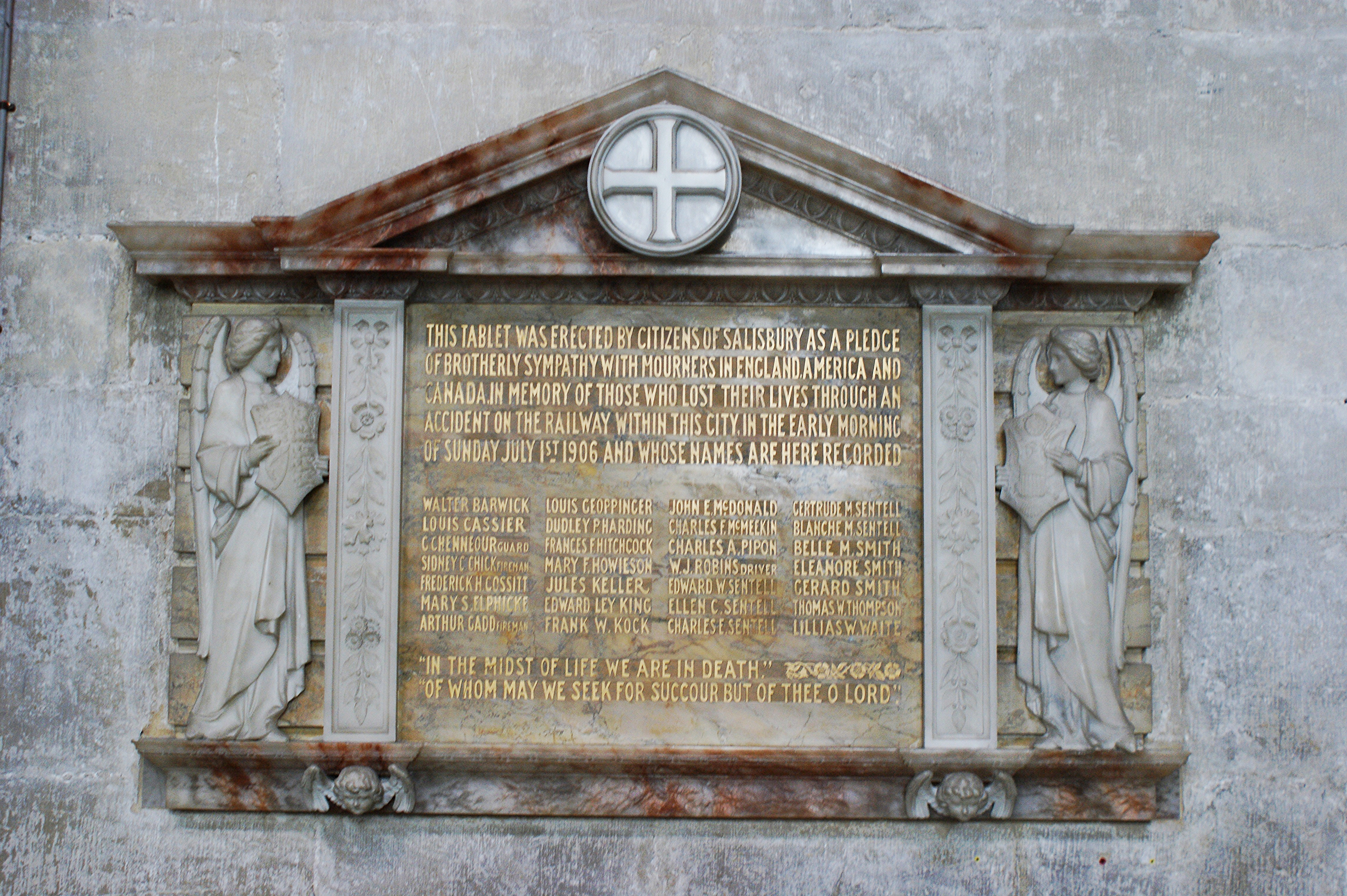
Memorial tablet in Salisbury Cathedral

There is a memorial tablet to the 28 dead (including the driver, two firemen and the guard) in Salisbury Cathedral.

The accident was the first in a series of three derailments due to excessive speed at night in a 16-month period; the others were at Grantham in 1906 and Shrewsbury in 1907. All three resulted in deaths, including the footplate crews; the cause in each case was recorded as driver error but there has been much speculation since.

== See also ==
- Lists of rail accidents
- List of rail accidents in the United Kingdom
- 2021 Salisbury rail crash

=== Similar accidents ===
- Amagasaki derailment – Japan, 2005 – overspeed through sharp curve
- Santiago de Compostela derailment – Spain, 2013
- Eckwersheim derailment – France, 2015
- Rail accidents at Morpeth – England, 1969, 1984, 1994 – three occasions, overspeed through sharp curve
