= LSWR S11 class =

LSWR/SR S11
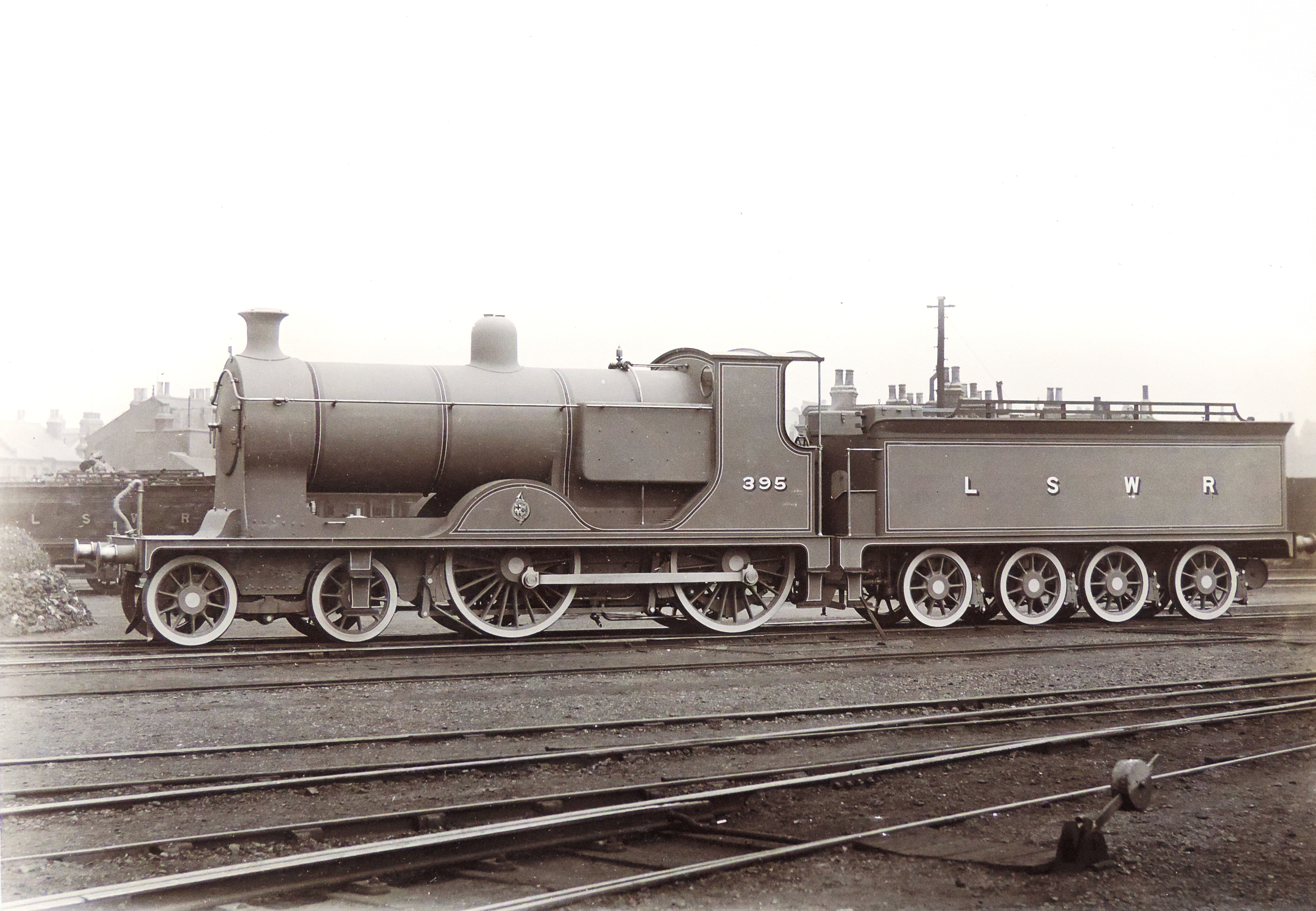
- LSWR 395
Type and origin
- Power type: Steam
- Designer: Dugald Drummond
- Builder: LSWR Nine Elms Works
- Build date: 1903
- Total produced: 10
Specifications
- Configuration
  - Whyte: 4-4-0
- Gauge: 4 ft 8 1/2 in (1,435 mm)
- Leading dia.: 3 ft 7 in (1.092 m)
- Driver dia.: 6 ft 1 in (1.854 m)
- Length: 63 ft 9 in (19.43 m)
- Total weight: 86 long tons (87.4 t)
- Fuel type: Coal
- Fuel capacity: 5 long tons (5.1 t; 5.6 short tons)
- Water cap.: 4,000 imp gal (18,000 L)
- Boiler pressure: 175 psi (1.21 MPa)
- Cylinders: Two, inside
- Cylinder size: 19 in × 26 in (480 mm × 660 mm)
- Valve gear: Stephenson
Performance figures
- Tractive effort: 19,126 lbf (85.08 kN)
Career
- Operators: London and South Western Railway, Southern Railway, British Railways
- Class: LSWR / SR: S11
- Power class: LSWR / SR: E BR: 2P, later 3P
- Locale: Southern Region
- Withdrawn: 1951–1954
- Disposition: All scrapped

The LSWR Class S11 was a class of 10 4-4-0 steam locomotives built for express passenger work on the London and Southwestern Railway by Dugald Drummond in 1903.

== Background ==
The problem of uniting both power and traction in a compact express passenger locomotive design had taxed the Locomotive Superintendents of the LSWR for many years. Joseph Beattie was the first to establish the LSWR's policy of using smaller wheeled locomotives to handle these steep gradients.

Dugald Drummond attempted to grasp the nettle by utilising his new T9 class over the arduous route. It soon became clear that despite the merits of the T9s for fast running on the various express passenger services to the west of England, the large wheels of the class were not suited for the task in hand. A new design of locomotive was needed that incorporated the desired improvements to enable fast running on gradients.

== Construction history ==
Drummond decided to construct a new class of ten 4-4-0s specifically for this part of the LSWR network. The class incorporated the same frames as the T9 but with smaller 6 feet 1 inch (1.854 m) driving wheels and balanced crank axles. The boiler was also 5 feet (1.52 m) in diameter, also different from the T9s, and capped with a dome and stovepipe chimney. Production began at Nine Elms in 1903 and all ten were finished by the end of the year. All examples were fitted with Drummond's "watercart" eight-wheel tender for longer nonstop running.

The class was fitted with cross-water tubes in the firebox as on the T9 class, although feedwater tubes were not fitted. This was done to increase the water's heating surface, which although successful made the boiler more complex. The class was superheated between 1920 and 1922 by Drumond's successor Robert Urie.

Year	Batch	Quantity	LSWR number	Notes
1903	S11	5	395–399	
1903	V11	5	400–404	

== Livery and numbering ==
=== LSWR and Southern ===
Under the LSWR, the class was outshopped in the LSWR Passenger Sage Green livery with purple-brown edging, creating panels of green. This was further lined in white and black with 'LSWR' in gilt on the tender tank sides.

When transferred to Southern Railway ownership after 1923, the locomotives were outshopped in Richard Maunsell's darker version of the LSWR livery. The LSWR standard gilt lettering was changed to yellow with 'Southern' on the water tank sides. The locomotives also featured black and white lining.

However, despite Bulleid's experimentation with Malachite Green livery on express passenger locomotive, the Maunsell livery was continued with the S11s, though the 'Southern' lettering on the tender was changed to the 'Sunshine Yellow' style. During the Second World War, members of the class outshopped form overhaul were turned out in wartime black, and some of the class retained this livery to Nationalisation.

=== Post-1948 (nationalisation) ===
Livery after Nationalisation was initially Southern Wartime Black livery with 'British Railways' on the tender, and an 'S' prefix on the number, until superseded by the Standard BR 30xxx series.

== Operational details ==
The S11s were well regarded on expresses around the ports served by the LSWR. The class was initially used in the West Country to handle the steep gradients they were designed for. However, it was found that their smaller wheels and larger boilers were not as successful as was hoped. The class was slower and more cumbersome than the T9s, leading to crews preferring the latter's higher speed both on downhill and level stretches of railway.

Another issue with the class was that they consumed more water with their larger boilers, which was a major issue for a railway with no water troughs to refill while running, and therefore skilled use of the injectors was required. The boiler was mounted higher above the frames which led to ride instability at high speeds and required more care by crewmen in approaching junctions and speed restrictions. 9 members of the class were withdrawn in 1951, with the last member scrapped in 1954.

Table of withdrawals
Year	Quantity in service at start of year	Quantity withdrawn	Locomotive numbers	Notes
1951	10	9	30395–99, 30401–04	
1954	1	1	30400	
