= Dugald Drummond =

Scottish steam locomotive engineer (1840–1912)

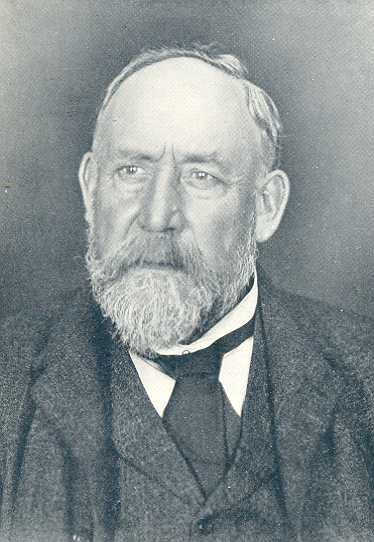
- Dugald Drummond
- Born: 1 January 1840; Ardrossan, Ayrshire, Scotland
- Died: 8 November 1912 (aged 72); Surbiton, Surrey, England
- Resting place: Brookwood Cemetery; 51.299236°N 0.623569°W
- Engineering career
- Discipline: Mechanical and Locomotive
- Employer(s): North British Railway; Caledonian Railway; London and South Western Railway
- Awards: Telford medal (1896/7)

Dugald Drummond (1 January 1840 – 8 November 1912) was a Scottish steam locomotive engineer. He had a career with the North British Railway, LB&SCR, Caledonian Railway and London and South Western Railway. He was the older brother of the engineer Peter Drummond, who often followed Dugald's ideas in his own work.

He was a major locomotive designer and builder and many of his London and South Western Railway engines continued in main line service with the Southern Railway to enter British Railways service in 1947. He was awarded a Telford medal by the Institution of Civil Engineers in 1896/7 for a presentation on 'high pressure in locomotives'.

== Career ==
Drummond was born in Ardrossan, Ayrshire on 1 January 1840. His father was permanent way inspector for the Bowling Railway. Drummond was apprenticed to Forest & Barr of Glasgow gaining further experience on the Dumbartonshire and Caledonian Railways. He was in charge of the boiler shop at the Canada Works, Birkenhead of Thomas Brassey before moving to the Edinburgh and Glasgow Railway's Cowlairs railway works in 1864 under Samuel Waite Johnson.

He became foreman erector at the Lochgorm Works, Inverness, of the Highland Railway under William Stroudley and followed Stroudley to the London Brighton and South Coast Railway's Brighton Works in 1870. In 1875, he was appointed Locomotive Superintendent of the North British Railway.

=== Tay bridge disaster ===
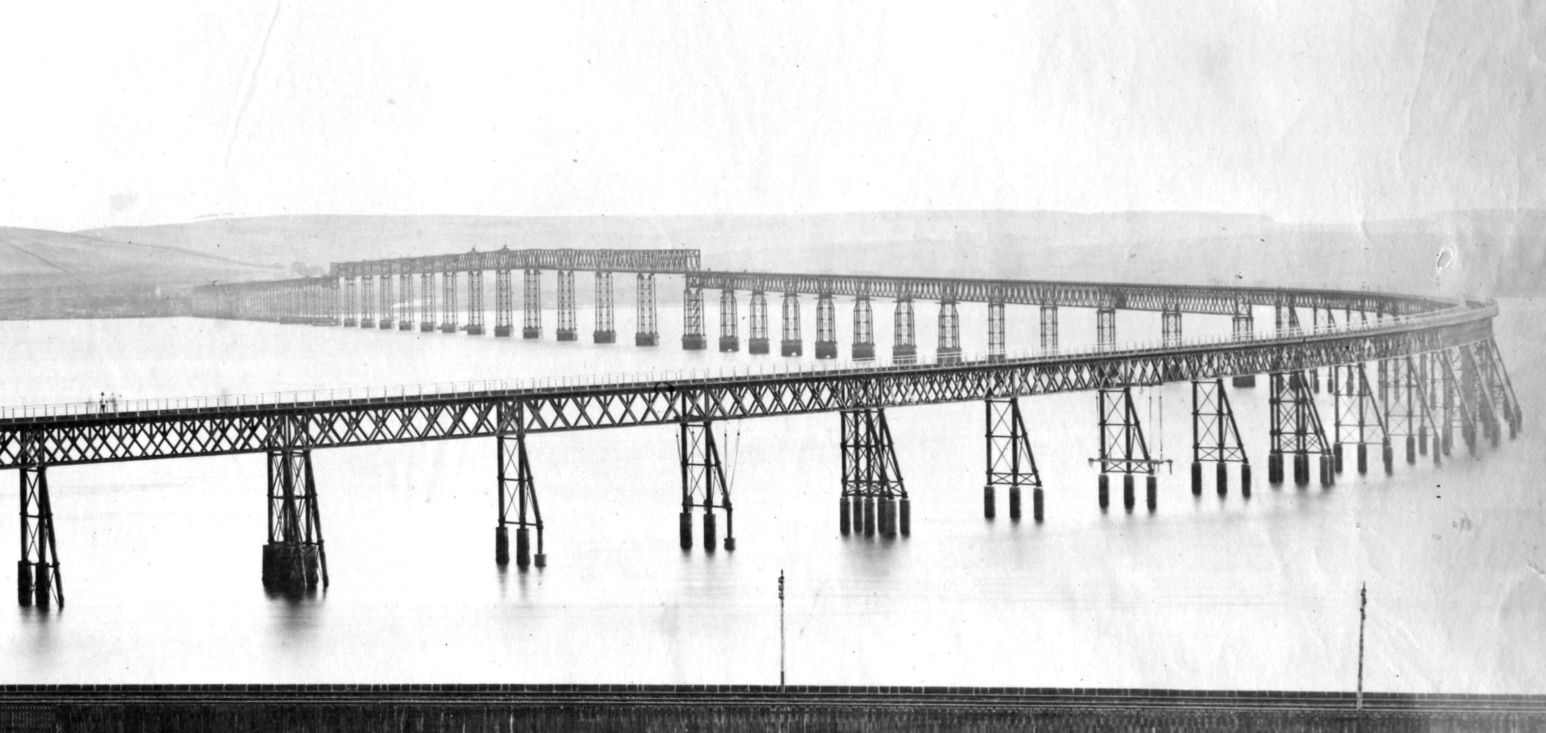
Original Tay Bridge from the north

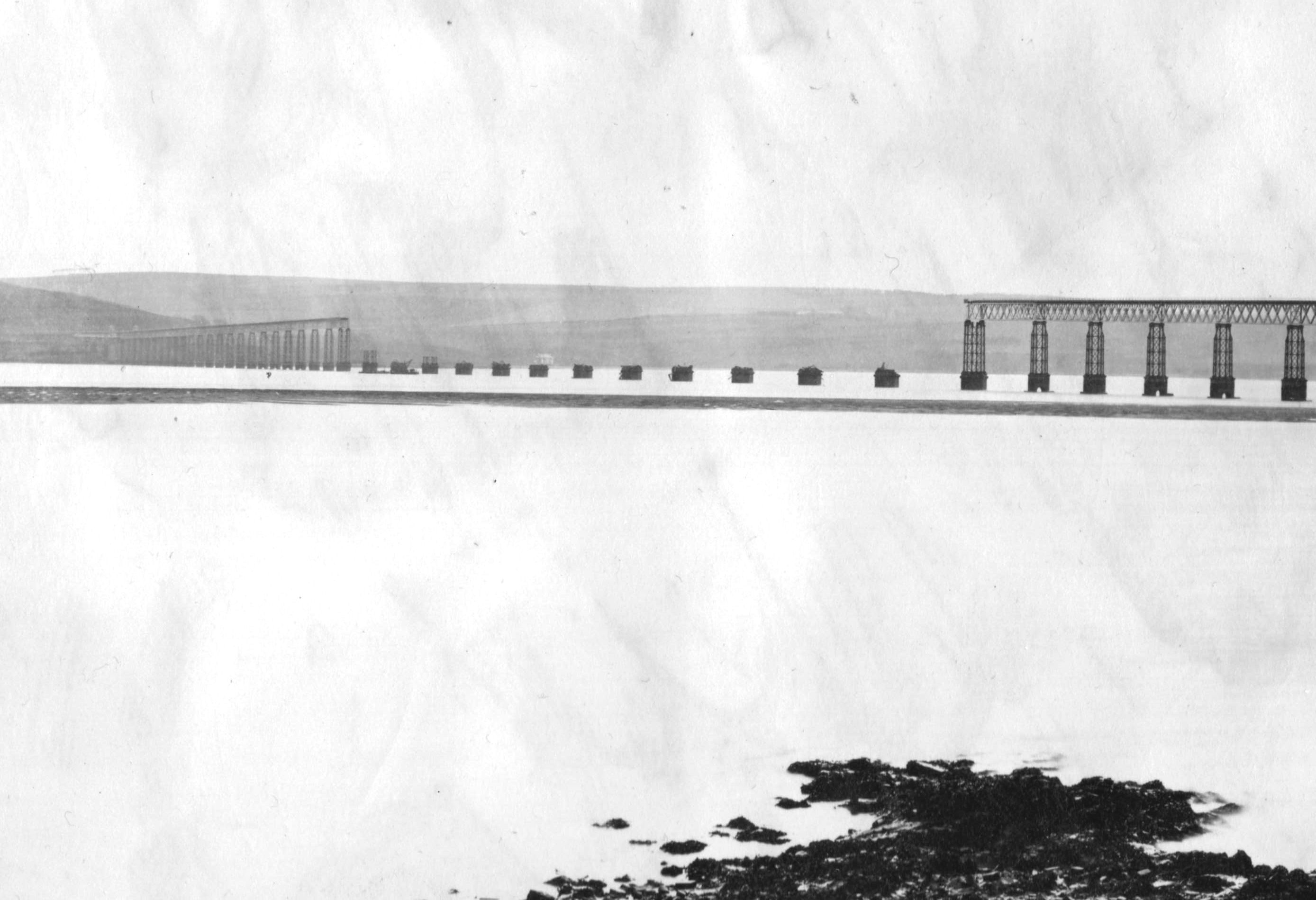
Fallen Tay Bridge from the north

Drummond was involved as an expert witness in the Tay Bridge disaster of 1879, being called to give evidence about the state of the track after the disaster. Although Ladybank, a 0-4-2 locomotive of Drummond's design, had been booked to work the train it had broken down and was replaced by no. 224, a 4-4-0 to the design of Thomas Wheatley, thus freeing Drummond to act as an independent witness. He said that the entire train had fallen vertically down when the High Girders collapsed, from the impact marks the wheels had made on the lines. All the axles of the train were bent in one direction. The evidence helped disprove Thomas Bouch's theory that the train had been blown off the rails by the storm that night.

=== Further career ===
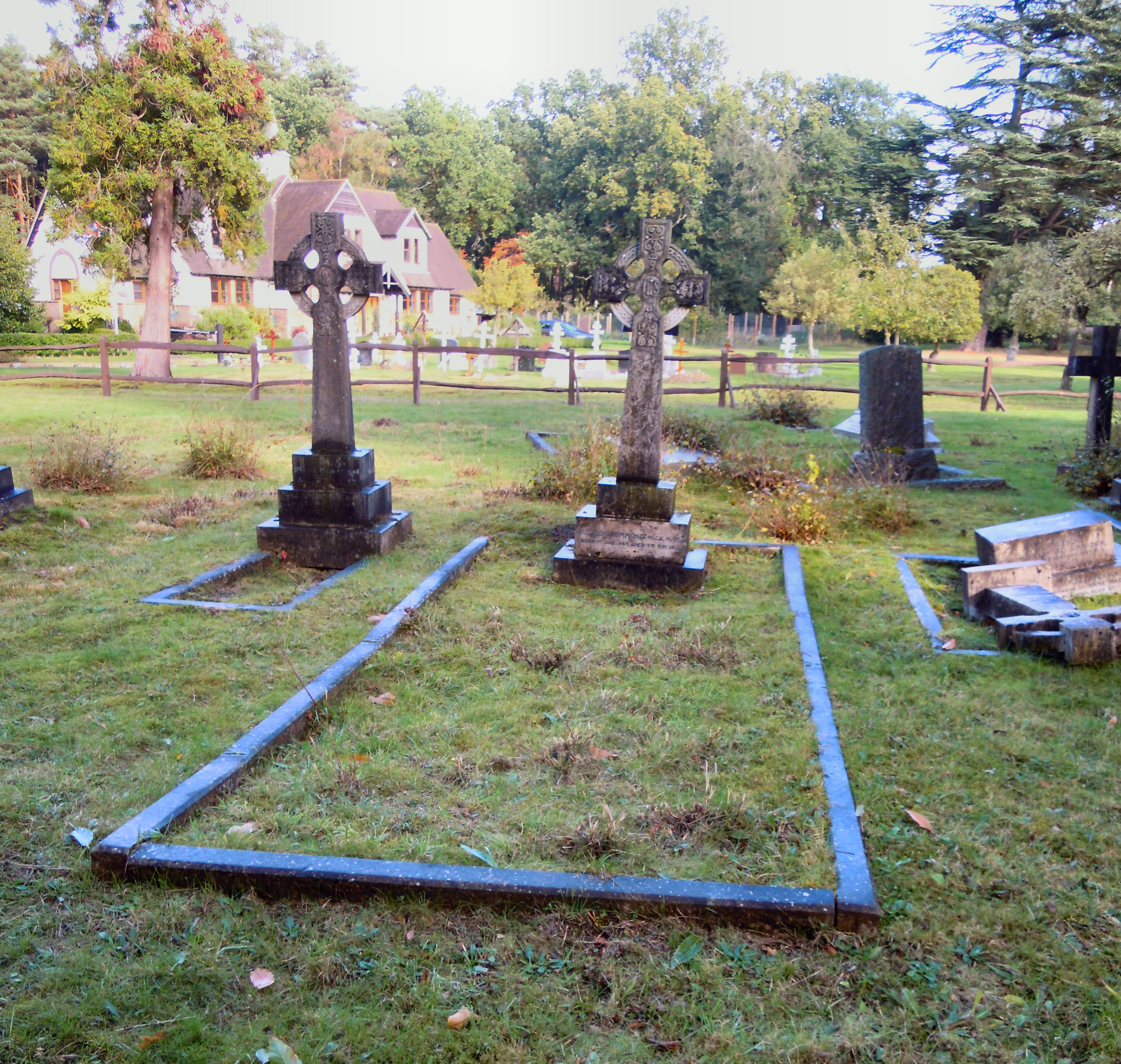
Drummond's grave in Brookwood Cemetery

In 1882 he moved to the Caledonian Railway. In April 1890 he tendered his resignation to enter business, establishing the Australasian Locomotive Engine Works at Sydney, Australia. The scheme failed rapidly and he returned to Scotland, founding the Glasgow Railway Engineering Company. Although the business was moderately successful, Drummond accepted the post as locomotive engineer of the London and South Western Railway in 1895, at a salary considerably less than that he had received on the Caledonian Railway. The title of his post was changed to Chief Mechanical Engineer in January 1905, although his duties hardly changed. He remained with the LSWR until his death. His locomotives for this railway were usually capable, as long as they had no more than 8 wheels. However, his 4-6-0 designs ranged from disastrous to mediocre. He also encumbered many of his LSWR engines with innovations which he had patented himself, such as firebox cross water tubes, and his smokebox steam drier, which only gave a very small degree of superheat. After his death, his successors improved the performance of many of his engines by fitting them with conventional smoke tube superheaters.

In addition to his post at LSWR, in 1895 Drummond was appointed as Locomotive Superintendent to the National Rifle Association, with responsibility for rolling stock on the Bisley Camp tramways. In 1897 he oversaw the design and construction of a new target truck for the Running deer range, using targets that had been designed for the ranges at Wimbledon by eminent animal painter Sir Edwin Landseer.

Drummond died on 8 November 1912 aged 72 at his home at Surbiton. A myth has developed that he died as a result of scalding received on the footplate. However C. Hamilton Ellis states that he had got cold and wet and demanded a hot mustard bath for his numb feet. He was scalded by the boiling water. He neglected the burns, gangrene set in and amputation became necessary. He refused an anaesthetic and died of the shock. He is buried at Brookwood Cemetery, which is adjacent to the LSWR mainline, in a family grave just a stone's throw from the former terminus of the London Necropolis Railway.

== Family ==
Drummond's daughter, Christine Sarah Louise was born in Brighton in 1871, soon after the family's arrival there from Scotland. She married James Johnson, son of Samuel Waite Johnson CME of the Midland Railway 1873–1904. Her third child, born in 1905 was named Dugald Samuel Waite Johnson after both of his grandfathers.

== Locomotive designs ==
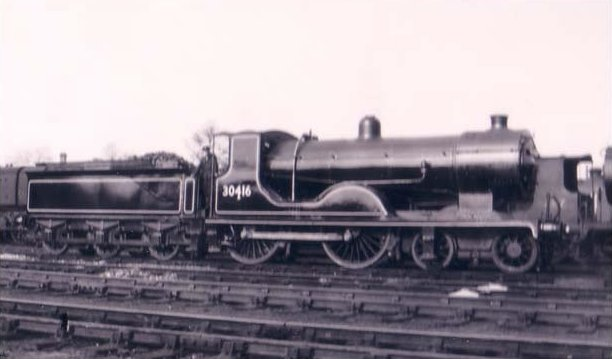
30415 class L12 at Eastleigh in 1949.

Drummond designed the following classes of locomotives:

=== North British Railway ===
- NBR 165 class 0-6-0T, later LNER class J82
- NBR 100 class 0-6-0, later LNER class J32
- NBR 474 class 2-2-2
- NBR 476 class 4-4-0, later LNER classes D27 and D28
- NBR 157 class 0-4-2T, later 0-4-4T, later LNER class G8
- NBR 494 class 4-4-0T, later LNER class D50
- NBR 34 class 0-6-0, later LNER class J34

=== Caledonian Railway ===
- Caledonian Railway 294 Class 0-6-0, later LMS class 2F
- Caledonian Railway 66 Class 4-4-0, later LMS class 2P
- Caledonian Railway 171 Class 0-4-4T, later LMS class 1P
- Caledonian Railway 262 Class 0-4-2ST, later LMS class 0P
- Caledonian Railway 264 Class 0-4-0ST, later LMS class 0F
- Caledonian Railway 123, 4-2-2, later LMS 14010, class 1P
- Caledonian Railway 385 Class 0-6-0ST, later LMS class 3F
- Caledonian Railway 80 Class 4-4-0, later LMS class 1P
- Caledonian Railway 272 Class 0-6-0ST, later LMS class 0F

=== London and South Western Railway ===
- LSWR 700 class 0-6-0 known latterly as "the Black Motors"
- LSWR M7 class 0-4-4 tank engines known as "Motor Tanks"
- LSWR T7 class 4-2-2-0 prototype "double single"
- LSWR C8 class 4-4-0
- LSWR F9 class 4-2-4T known as "the Bug"
- LSWR T9 class 4-4-0 known as "Greyhounds"
- LSWR E10 class 4-2-2-0 "double single"
- LSWR K10 class 4-4-0 known as "Small Hoppers"
- LSWR K11 class railcar
- LSWR L11 class 4-4-0 known as "Large Hoppers"
- LSWR S11 class 4-4-0
- LSWR L12 class 4-4-0 known as "Bulldogs"
- LSWR H12 class railcar
- LSWR F13 class 4-6-0
- LSWR H13 class railcar
- LSWR C14 class 2-2-0 motor tank – later rebuilt as 0-4-0
- LSWR K14 class 0-4-0 tank engines first designed by Adams as class B4
- LSWR E14 class 4-6-0 known as "the Turkey"
- LSWR G14 class 4-6-0
- LSWR P14 class 4-6-0
- LSWR T14 class 4-6-0 known as "Paddleboxes"
- LSWR D15 class 4-4-0

== Patents ==
- GB189727949, published 15 October 1898, Improvements in locomotive boilers
- GB189901077, published 2 December 1899, Improvements in apparatus for use in heating railway carriages

Business positions
Preceded by Thomas Wheatley	Locomotive Superintendent of the North British Railway; 1875–1882	Succeeded by Matthew Holmes
Preceded by George Brittain	Locomotive Superintendent of the Caledonian Railway; 1882–1890	Succeeded by Hugh Smellie
Preceded by William Adams	Locomotive Superintendent of the London and South Western Railway; 1895–1912	Succeeded by Robert Urie
