= NBR D class 0-6-0 =

NBR Class D by Dugald Drummond

NBR Class D LNER Class J34
Type and origin
- Power type: Steam
- Designer: Dugald Drummond
- Builder: Dübs and Company (1st batch); Cowlairs Works(subsequent batches)
- Build date: 1879-1883; Rebuilt 1892-1908
- Total produced: 101
Specifications
- Configuration
  - Whyte: 0-6-0
- Gauge: 4 ft 8 1/2 in (1,435 mm)
- Coupled dia.: 5 ft 0 in (1.52 m)
- Wheelbase: 15 ft 3 in (4.65 m)
- Length: 35 ft 8 in (10.87 m)
- Loco weight: 37.13 long tons (37.73 t)
- Total weight: 69.13 long tons (70.24 t)
- Fuel type: Coal
- Firebox
  - Grate area: 16.5 sq ft (1.53 m^{2})
- Boiler pressure: 150 psi (1.0 MPa)
- Cylinders: Two, inside
- Cylinder size: 17 in × 26 in (430 mm × 660 mm)
Performance figures
- Tractive effort: 15,967 lbf (71.02 kN)
Career
- Nicknames: Wee Drummonds
- Withdrawn: 1921-1928
- Disposition: All scrapped

NBR Class D LNER Class J33
Type and origin
- Power type: Steam
- Designer: Matthew Holmes (based largely on the design of Dugald Drummond)
- Builder: Cowlairs Works
- Build date: 1883-1887; Rebuilt 1908-1913
- Total produced: 36
Specifications
- Configuration
  - Whyte: 0-6-0
- Gauge: 4 ft 8 1/2 in (1,435 mm)
- Coupled dia.: 5 ft 0 in (1.52 m)
- Wheelbase: 15 ft 6 in (4.72 m)
- Length: 36 ft 0 in (10.97 m)
- Loco weight: 37.16 long tons (37.76 t)
- Total weight: 69.16 long tons (70.27 t)
- Fuel type: Coal
- Firebox
  - Grate area: 17 sq ft (1.6 m^{2})
- Boiler pressure: 150 psi (1.0 MPa)
- Cylinders: Two, inside
- Cylinder size: 17 in × 26 in (430 mm × 660 mm)
Performance figures
- Tractive effort: 15,967 lbf (71.02 kN)
Career
- Withdrawn: 1924-1932 (bulk withdrawals); 1938
- Disposition: All scrapped

The NBR Class D (later LNER Class J34) was a class of 0-6-0 steam locomotive of the North British Railway, often known as the Wee Drummonds. The class was designed by Dugald Drummond (Locomotive Superintendent). A total of 101 were built from 1883 to 1887.

The NBR Class D (later LNER Class J33) was an almost identical type of 0-6-0 locomotive. The design remained that of Dugald Drummond, but was slightly adapted by his successor Matthew Holmes. The changes were largely technical, whilst both classes of locomotive were virtually identical in outward appearance. A total of 36 were produced.

The class D engines (of both the Drummond and Holmes types) were highly successful with long service lives.

== Build dates ==
The initial D class (later J34) was built in batches; the first batch by Dübs and Company of Glasgow, and the subsequent batches by the North British Railway at their Cowlairs railway works. The engines were built between 1879 and 1883. All the engines were rebuilt during the years 1892 to 1908. It has been suggested that Drummond's design for these, and other 0-6-0 engines, was influenced by his admiration for locomotive designer William Stroudley.

The later class D locomotives (subsequently J33) were built in five batches between 1883 and 1887. Thus the North British Railway operated a total of 137 class D locomotives, 101 of the J34 type, and 36 of the J33 type.

== History ==
Although both types were classified as D when the NBR adopted formal class designations in 1913, in 1923 (on grouping) the LNER considered the locomotives to be sufficiently different mechanically to warrant different class designations. Thus the original Drummond D class became LNER class J34, whilst the modified Holmes D class became LNER class J33. There are documented examples of even the NBR's own locomotive workshops failing to correctly distinguish between the J33 and J34 types of D class engine, owing to their near-identical appearance.

=== Class D (J34) ===
The Class D (J34) engines were designed to meet a perceived need for a smaller version of the already highly successful Drummond class C (later J32) 0-6-0 freight engines. The problem with the class C engines was their size and weight, which made them unsuitable for certain routes. Drummond produced the class D on similar principles, but with a significant reduction in overall length and weight of the engine, thus permitting far wider route access for freight train operation. This led to the popular nickname "Wee Drummonds" for members of the class.

The engines performed well, and although designed for light freight were regularly employed on mainline passenger services or wherever required on the network. They were versatile and flexible, owing to their size and weight. This ease of use led to almost all the engines surviving into LNER ownership. However, the LNER began withdrawing the class almost immediately, and the last two were scrapped in January 1928.

=== Class D (J33) ===
The Holmes class D (J33) were simply a continuation of the earlier Drummond type, in which the toolbox from the rear of the tender was removed and were given a different, non-sloping fire grate. The Drummond D class engines were modified as such when they were rebuilt.

Owing to the close similarity, they were often identified colloquially as "Wee Drummonds", although the nickname properly belongs only to the J34 type. At a late stage in construction Holmes designed a new cab for the D class engines, although the bulk of the modified class D machines (J33) had already been built with Drummond cabs, just like the original class D engines (J34). Thus the machines with the Holmes style cabs simply became another variation within the class. It was suggested (for example, by NBR historian John Thomas) that the drivers found the Holmes cabs more pleasant to work in, and less draughty.

Like the original D class engines, the modified D class saw widespread service not only on their intended work (light freight), but also on suburban passenger services, and sometimes even long-distance coal trains. The later members of the class were actually fitted with the Westinghouse brake apparatus from new, an indication of the intention to employ them on passenger services. Under the LNER they were gradually relegated to secondary roles such as station pilot or shunter. They were withdrawn between 1924 and 1932 with the exception of two engines (9159 and 9249) which survived considerably longer, both being scrapped in 1938.

== Accidents ==
- On 28 November 1890, two class D locomotives were involved in a serious head-on collision on Todd's Mill Viaduct. The engines involved were numbers 501 and 524, the latter actually crashing off the viaduct, resulting in a fall of around 60 feet (18 m).

== Preservation ==
The last J34 was scrapped in 1928, and the last J33 was scrapped in 1938.

== Sources ==
- Ian Allan ABC of British Railways Locomotives, 1948 edition, part 4.
