= LSWR M7 class =

Class of 105 two-cylinder 0-4-4T locomotives

LSWR/SR M7
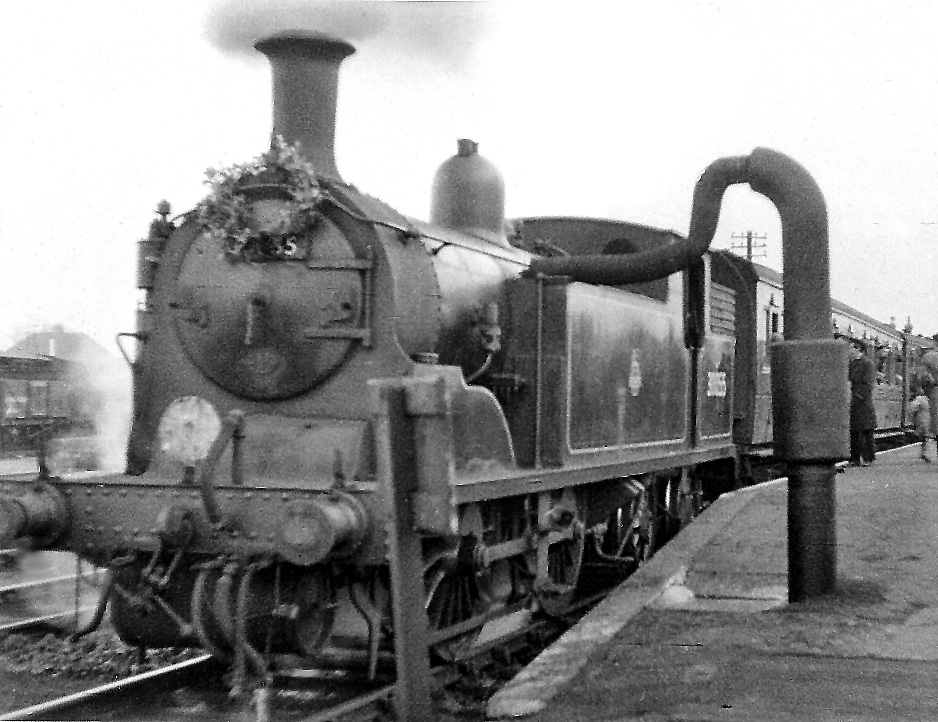
- Ex-LSWR M7 No. 30055 at Alton
Type and origin
- Power type: Steam
- Designer: Dugald Drummond
- Builder: LSWR Nine Elms Works (95); LSWR Eastleigh Works (10)
- Build date: 1897–1911
- Total produced: 105
Specifications
- Configuration
  - Whyte: 0-4-4T
- Gauge: 4 ft 8 1/2 in (1,435 mm)
- Driver dia.: 5 ft 7 in (1,702 mm)
- Trailing dia.: 3 ft 7 in (1,092 mm)
- Length: 34 ft 8 in (10.57 m)
- Loco weight: 60 long tons 4 cwt (134,800 lb or 61.2 t)
- Fuel type: Coal
- Fuel capacity: 3 long tons 5 cwt (7,300 lb or 3.3 t)
- Water cap.: 1,300 imp gal (5,900 L; 1,600 US gal)
- Boiler pressure: 175 lbf/in^{2} (1.21 MPa) OR 150 lbf/in^{2} (1.03 MPa)
- Cylinders: Two, inside
- Cylinder size: 18.5 in × 26 in (470 mm × 660 mm)
Performance figures
- Tractive effort: 19,755 lbf (87.87 kN) (@175 psi); 16,933 lbf (75.32 kN) (@150 psi)
Career
- Operators: London and South Western Railway, Southern Railway, British Railways
- Class: M7
- Power class: LSWR / SR: K BR: 2P
- Locale: Great Britain
- Withdrawn: 1937 (1), 1948 (1), 1957–1965
- Preserved: Nos. 245 and 53
- Disposition: Two preserved, remainder scrapped

The LSWR M7 class is a class of 0-4-4T passenger tank locomotive built between 1897 and 1911. The class was designed by Dugald Drummond for use on the intensive London network of the London and South Western Railway (LSWR), and performed well in such tasks. Because of their utility, 105 were built and the class went through several modifications over five production batches. For this reason there were detail variations such as frame length. Many of the class were fitted with push-pull operation gear that enabled efficient use on branch line duties without the need to change to the other end of its train at the end of a journey.

Under LSWR and Southern Railway ownership they had been successful suburban passenger engines, although with the increased availability of newer, standard designs, many of the class were diagrammed to take on a new role as reliable branch line engines, especially in Southern England.

Members of the class lasted in service until 1964, and two examples have survived into preservation: number 245 in the National Railway Museum, and 53 (as BR 30053) on the Swanage Railway.

== Background ==
Drummond designed these locomotives to answer the need for a larger and more powerful version of William Adams' 0-4-4 T1 class of 1888. The Adams T1's 5 ft 7 in (1,702 mm) wheels had been developed to meet the LSWR's requirement for a compact and sure-footed suburban passenger locomotive to be utilised on the intensive commuter timetables around London. However, by the mid-1890s the suburban services around London were growing at a rate which began to preclude the use of these and other older classes of locomotive.

== Construction history ==
The M7 tank locomotive was the first design by Dugald Drummond upon replacing William Adams as Locomotive Superintendent of the LSWR in 1895. It was an enlargement of the T1 with a sloping grate of increased area giving greater power. Drummond drew upon his previous experience with the successful London, Brighton and South Coast Railway D1 class, whilst he was works manager at Brighton in the early 1870s, and his own 157 class of 1877, on the North British Railway in Scotland. It was the heaviest 0-4-4 type ever to run in Britain.

The first 25 were constructed at Nine Elms Locomotive Works between March and November 1897. Thereafter the M7 class had a long production run, with five major sets of design variants. Between 1897 and 1899, the locomotives were constructed with a short overhang at the front, and sandboxes combined with the front splashers. Injectors and a lever-type reverser were also added, and a conical, as opposed to flat, smokebox door was implemented on numbers 252–256. In 1900 the design was modified to incorporate the sandboxes inside the smokebox; these were later relocated below the running plate.

After 1903, a 36 ft 3 in (11.05 m) frame with a longer overhang at the front end was introduced and steam reversing gear fitted. Some sources record these locomotives as X14 class, and this designation was sometimes used to refer to the longer-framed versions, but for most purposes the two sub-classes were grouped together and known as M7. The 1904/05 construction batch moved the sandboxes back to the front splasher and new items were feed water heating, single ram pumps and balanced crank axles. For the remainder of construction from the outshopping of the 105th locomotive in 1911, duplex pumps were fitted.

Several of the most successful features of the class were used by Drummond on his other designs. Thus the boiler, cylinders and motion were identical and interchangeable with those used on his 700 class 0-6-0 freight locomotives of 1897 and the same boiler was used on his C8 4-4-0 passenger class.

Year	Order	Builder	Quantity	LSWR numbers	Notes
1897	M7	LSWR Nine Elms	25	242–256, 667–676	Short frame
1898	V7	LSWR Nine Elms	10	31–40	Short frame
1899	E9	LSWR Nine Elms	10	22–26, 41–44, 241	Short frame
1900	B10	LSWR Nine Elms	5	112, 318–321	Short frame
1900	C10	LSWR Nine Elms	5	322–324, 356–357	Short frame
1903	G11	LSWR Nine Elms	5	123–124, 130, 132–133	Long frame
1903	H11	LSWR Nine Elms	5	374–378	Long frame
1904	B12	LSWR Nine Elms	5	21, 27–30	Long frame
1904	C12	LSWR Nine Elms	5	108–111, 379	Long frame
1905	X12	LSWR Nine Elms	5	45, 104–107	Long frame
1905	Y12	LSWR Nine Elms	5	46–50	Long frame
1905	B13	LSWR Nine Elms	5	51–55	Long frame
1906	D13	LSWR Nine Elms	5	56–60	Long frame
1911	X14	LSWR Eastleigh	5	125–129	Long frame
1911	A15	LSWR Eastleigh	5	131, 328, 479–481	Long frame

=== Boiler pressure ===
According to Bradley (p. 108) the original 175 lbf/in^{2} (1.21 MPa) working pressure was reduced to 150 lbf/in^{2} (1.03 MPa) to reduce wear on the boilers in 1900 when it became clear that they were no longer to be used for sustained high speed running. However H. C. Casserley states that the pressure was increased from 150 to 175 pounds-force per square inch (1.03 to 1.21 MPa).

=== Push-pull equipment ===
After 1912, thirty-one M7 locomotives were equipped with push-pull train capabilities with the provision of a primitive cable and pulley device. This modification was meant to save time on country branch lines where the locomotive needed to couple to the opposite end of the train for return trips. With this it was possible for the driver to run the train from the cab of designated push-pull coaches, leaving the fireman to manage the fire and water levels.

The pulley system was eventually deemed unsafe due to instances of sagging and delayed reaction, thus it was replaced by a safer compressed air system on 36 engines between 1930 and 1937. This system had seen successful use on the LBSCR. Because the air compressor required extra space for installation, these conversions were confined to the long-framed members of the class.

A further four conversions to push-pull capability appeared between 1960 and 1962. This was the result of short-framed M7s receiving long frames during overhaul to create room for the compressor.

=== Variants ===
Following the successful use of superheating on other Drummond classes, Robert Urie experimentally fitted a superheated boiler to No. 126 in December 1920, together with an extended smokebox and larger cylinders. The additional weight of the new boiler raised the centre of gravity of the locomotive, thereby adding to problems of instability on faster main line trains, whilst simultaneously preventing its use on many branch lines. As a result, no further examples were fitted, and No.126 was eventually broken up for spare parts in 1937. In 1931 No. 672 was experimentally fitted with the Strowger-Hudd Automatic Warning System, but the equipment was not adopted by the Southern Railway and the equipment later removed.

== Operational details ==
When first introduced to LSWR, several of the class were allocated to work semi-fast passenger services between London and Portsmouth, Exeter and Plymouth, and Bournemouth and Weymouth. However they were withdrawn from these duties after a high-speed derailment near Tavistock in 1898, following criticism by the Board of Trade inspector about the use of front-coupled locomotives on fast services. As a result, the class was to become synonymous with local main line and branch workings, as well as London suburban services.

With the gradual growth of the electrification of Inner London's suburban lines after 1915, the class tended to be used on stopping trains on the LSWR main line, and on services to Guildford and Reading. After the formation of the Southern Railway in 1923 the class gradually began to be used, further afield, notably in the west of England, but also on branch lines in Kent, and on the former South Eastern and Chatham Railway line between Redhill and Reading.

During the 1950s, a substantial number of the "push-pull" fitted members of the class was transferred to the Central Section of the Southern Region, at Brighton and Horsham, replacing worn-out D3 locomotives on the branch lines of the former London, Brighton and South Coast Railway in West Sussex. A further ten were transferred to Tunbridge Wells and Three Bridges in 1955 for use on East Sussex branches. These were less well accepted by the train crews, who preferred the theoretically less powerful SECR H class. Others remained in the London area on empty stock workings, notably between Clapham Junction and Waterloo station.

The class was gradually replaced in the southeast England during the late 1950s and early 1960s due to the introduction of further electrification, new lightweight standard steam classes, diesel shunters, and diesel-electric multiple units. By the end of 1963 the majority that remained were based at Bournemouth to work the Swanage branch.

== Accidents and incidents ==
- On 25 May 1933, locomotive No. 107 was hauling a passenger train when it was derailed at Raynes Park, London, coming to rest foul of an adjacent line. A separate passenger train, hauled by SR U class 2-6-0 No. 1618, was in a side-long collision with it. Five people were killed and 35 were injured. The accident was caused by a failure to implement a speed restriction on a section of track under maintenance.
- On 13 April 1948, an M7 locomotive No. 672 was involved in an accident with the lift that serviced the Waterloo & City Line. As a number of coal wagons were being loaded onto the lift platform at the upper level, the platform tilted due to an error in engaging the required supports. The wagons and locomotive fell down the lift shaft. As there was no practicable method of retrieving any of the rolling stock, the locomotive and wagons were cut up on-site.
- On 27 November 1962, locomotive No. 30131 was derailed at Eastleigh, Hampshire after it was moved by an unauthorized person.

== Withdrawal and preservation ==
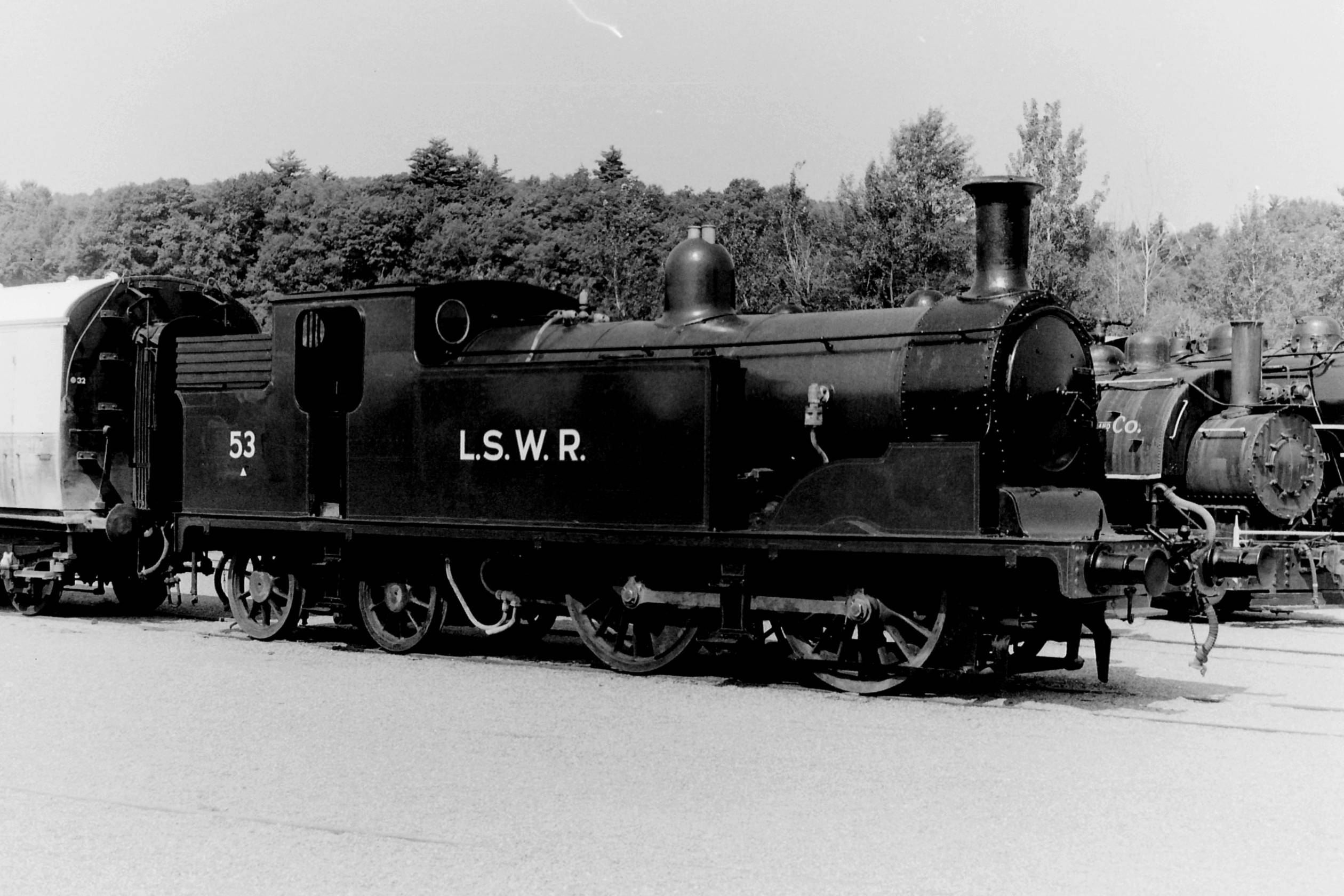
No. 30053 (numbered as No. 53) at Steamtown USA in Bellows Falls, Vermont in August 1970.

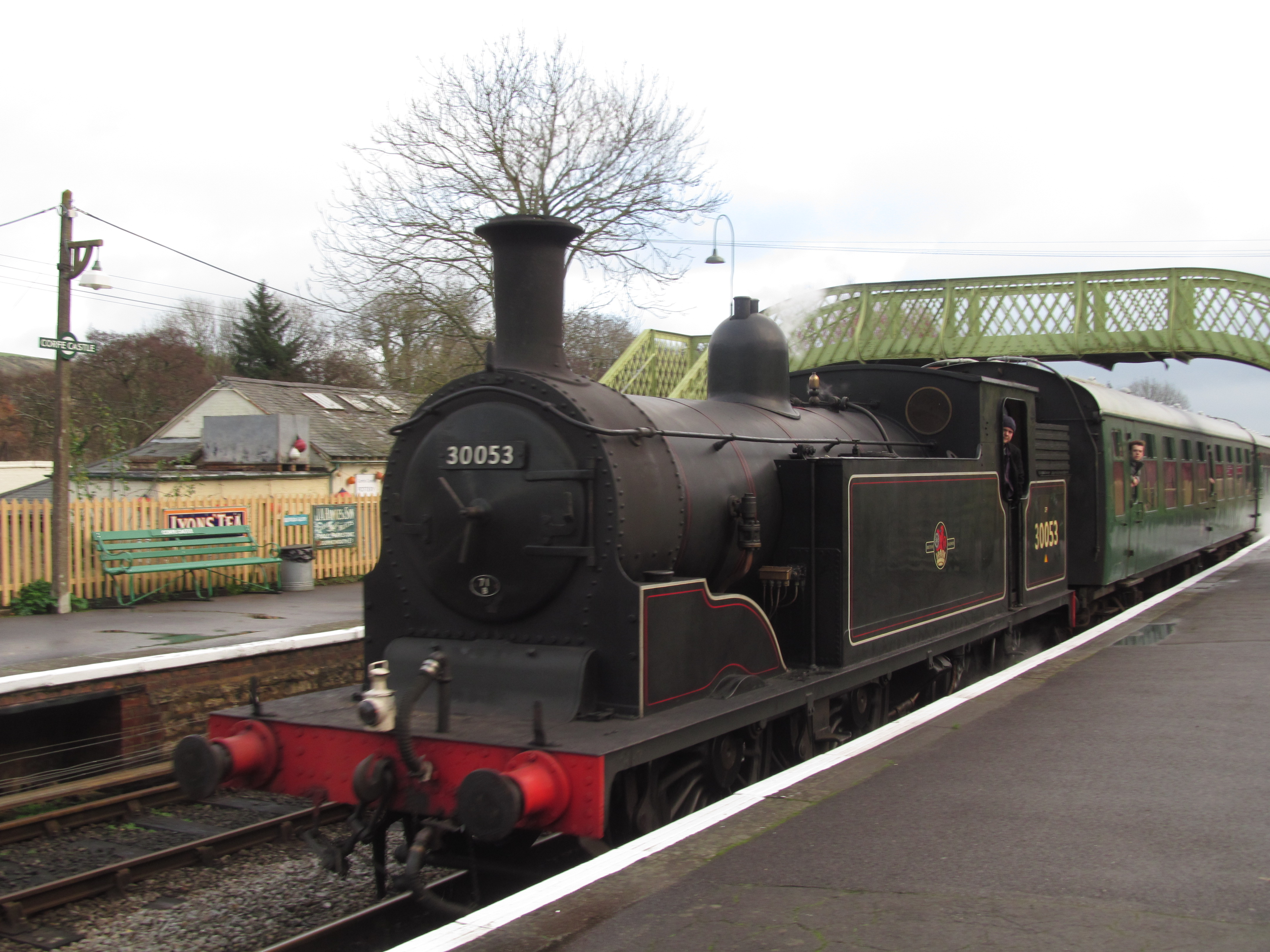
Preserved No. 30053 at Corfe Castle railway station

The Southern Railway first planned to withdraw the M7s from service in the 1940s, when chief mechanical engineer Oliver Bulleid's Leader class was being designed to replace them, but some subsequent testing proved the Leader class to be inadequate for service. Apart from the experimentally-boilered No. 126, all the M7s entered into British Railways service in 1948. In that year No. 672 fell down the lift shaft which provided rolling stock access to the Waterloo & City Line at Waterloo, and was scrapped. Between 1957 and 1964, the remainder of the class was gradually withdrawn as part of the Modernisation Plan.

Table of withdrawals
Year	Number in service at start of year	Number withdrawn	Locomotive numbers
1937	105	1	126
1948	104	1	30672
1957	103	4	30041–42, 30244/50
1958	99	8	30022/37–38, 30242–43, 30322/56, 30675
1959	91	16	30026–27/30/46/54, 30123/30, 30252/56, 30318/23–24/74/76, 30481, 30671
1960	75	8	30031/47/58, 30106/28, 30255, 30319, 30673
1961	67	20	30023/40/43–44/59–60, 30104/09/24, 30246–48/53, 30357, 30479, 30667–69/74/76
1962	47	14	30028/33/45/49–51, 30125/31–32, 30245, 30321/75/77–78
1963	33	20	30024/32/34–35/39/55–57, 30105/10/12/27/29, 30241/49/51, 30320/28/79, 30670
1964	13	13	30021/25/29/36/48/52–53, 30107–08/11/33, 30254, 30480

Two examples of this quintessential class of steam locomotive have survived into preservation and both were built by Nine Elms. Both engines have seen use at certain points in preservation. They are:

Number		Built	Withdrawn	Service Life	Location	Owners	Livery	Condition	Photograph	Notes
LSWR/SR	BR	Built	Withdrawn	Service Life	Location	Owners	Livery	Condition	Photograph	Notes
245	30245	Apr 1897	Nov 1962	65 Years, 7 months	National Railway Museum, York	National Collection	LSWR Lined Green	Static Display		Surviving records indicate that number 245 was constructed in 1897 at the cost of £1,846.
53	30053	Dec 1905	May 1964	58 Years, 5 months	Swanage Railway	Drummond Locomotives Limited	N/A	Undergoing overhaul		The locomotive was sold to Steamtown in Bellows Falls, Vermont in the United States of America in 1967. It was later sold to a British railfan organization and repatriated in 1987.

Despite being small engines with limited water capacity and a class 2 power rating, both have run mainline trains in preservation. During its time in steam 30245 travelled to open weekends under its own power as well appearing at London Waterloo in 1988. For the 2009 Eastleigh 100 event at Eastleigh Works, 30053 travelled by rail from Swanage to Eastleigh alongside 34028 Eddystone & 34070 Manston. Because none of the engines were mainline certified they had to be towed by a diesel.

In 1995, as part of the Woking Centenary, 30053 ran trips to Aldershot and London Waterloo from Woking without diesel assistance.

== Livery and numbering ==
=== LSWR and Southern Railway ===
Under the LSWR the class saw various liveries over its pre-grouping career. Most associated with the class during this period was the LSWR passenger light sage green livery with purple-brown edging, creating panels of green. This was further lined in white and black with "LSWR" in gilt on the water tank sides, and the locomotive number on the coal bunker sides. The National Railway Museum has chosen a non-typical green for the livery on No 245.

When transferred to Southern Railway ownership after 1923 the locomotives were outshopped in Richard Maunsell's darker version of the LSWR livery, with numbering having an 'E' prefix to denote Eastleigh. This was to prevent confusion with other locomotives of the same number inherited by the Southern from its constituent railways. "A" (denoting Ashford) was used for former South Eastern and Chatham Railway locomotives and "B" (Brighton for those from the London, Brighton and South Coast Railway. After 1931 the prefixes were dropped from former LSWR locomotives and the remainder were renumbered.

The gilt lettering was changed to yellow with "Southern" on the water tank sides with black and white lining.

With the appointment of Oliver Bulleid as Chief Mechanical Engineer of the Southern, livery policy was changed once again to malachite green for major passenger locomotives, with Sunshine Yellow lettering. This was lined with yellow and black with solid black edging. However, this livery was not applied to the M7 class, which were black with sunshine lettering shaded green. The numbers also lost their "E" prefix. During the war years the locomotives were outshopped in wartime black after overhaul, and some of the class retained this livery to nationalisation. Numbering depended on which batch the locomotive belonged to, and therefore each batch was allocated a series. After the war, four Nine Elms locomotives (38, 242, 243 and 244) were turned out in fully lined malachite green for Waterloo station pilot duties.

=== Post-1948 (nationalisation) ===
The M7 Class was given the BR Power Classification of 2P upon Nationalisation. Livery remained Southern black, though two malachite locos which were painted soon after (numbers 30038/30244) were lettered for British Railways in yellow Gill Sans style along the sides of their tanks. This was eventually replaced with BR lined mixed traffic black livery. Numbering was initially that of the Southern, though for a period an "S" prefix was added to the number. This was replaced with the BR standard numbering system, with all locomotives being allocated, by batch, numbers within the 30xxx series.

== Models ==
Dapol introduced a British N gauge model of the M7 in 2006, but has since ended production of this model. An updated model using new tooling was announced in February 2021.

In 2006, Hornby Railways introduced a model of the M7 in OO gauge. The earlier Triang Hornby company also manufactured an OO scale model of the M7 with opening smokebox door and crew: model No. R.754, introduced in 1967.
