= 1903 in rail transport =

This article lists events related to rail transport that occurred in 1903.

== Events ==
=== January events ===
- January 20 – The Grand Trunk Western Railroad opens a passenger depot in Lansing, Michigan.
- January 28 – Esmond Train Wreck: fourteen people are killed when the Crescent City Express (No. 8, bound for Benson, Arizona) collides head-on with the bound Pacific Coast Express (No. 7, bound for Tucson).

=== February events ===
- February 12 – North British Locomotive Company established as a locomotive builder in Glasgow, Scotland, by merger of Dübs & Company, Neilson, Reid & Company, and Sharp, Stewart & Company. In April it receives its first new order for steam locomotives, from India.

=== March events ===
- March 3 – Baker valve gear for steam locomotives is first patented in the United States.

=== April events ===
- April 7 – Apalachicola Northern Railroad, later to become AN Railway, is chartered.

=== May events ===
- May 3 – The Mersey Railway, operating between Birkenhead and Liverpool by tunnel beneath the River Mersey, England, converts from steam to electric traction.
- May 13 – The Fremont, Elkhorn & Missouri Valley Railroad (later to become part of Chicago & North Western Railway) begins passenger train service to Casper, Wyoming.
- May 25 – The Lackawanna & Wyoming Valley Railroad opens, becoming the first railroad in the United States to use an electrified third rail to power its trains.

=== July events ===
- July – Regular passenger traffic from Saint Petersburg to Vladivostok over the Trans-Siberian and Chinese Eastern Railways begins.
- July 1 – Opening of the Albula Railway portion of the Rhaetian Railway (RhB) (metre gauge) in Switzerland, passing through the Albula Tunnel, the highest of the principal Alpine tunnels at 1370 m.
- July 13 – Danbury Union Station in Danbury, Connecticut, on the New York, New Haven & Hartford Railroad, opens.
- July 27
  - Construction begins on the Baghdad Railway with the 200-kilometre (120 mi) segment between Konya and Bulgurlu in the Ottoman Empire (modern day Turkey).
  - Glasgow St Enoch rail accident, Scotland: sixteen killed when a train crashes into the buffers.

=== August events ===
- August 10 – Paris Metro train fire, France: electric fire on Paris Métro at Couronnes; 84 killed.
- August 17 – The Great Western Railway becomes the first British railway company to operate its own road motor services (i.e. buses), between Helston and The Lizard in Cornwall.

=== September events ===
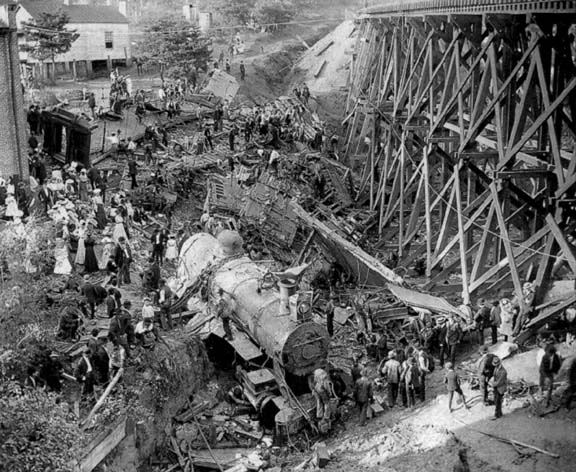
Aftermath of the Wreck of the Old 97 a few days after the accident.

- September 27 – Wreck of the Old 97, Danville, Virginia, United States: A southbound Southern Railway passenger train derails on a trestle in Danville; eleven people are killed.

=== October events ===
- October – Experimental electric trains, built by AEG and Siemens & Halske, reach 210.2 km/h (130.6 mph) between Marienfelde and Zossen in Germany.
- October 1
  - The first railway in Norway rebuilt to double track, from Bryn to Lillestrøm on the Hovedbanen, is opened.
  - The Gold Coast Government Railway is extended from Obuasi to Kumasi.
- October 21 – Howard Elliott succeeds Charles Sanger Mellen as president of Northern Pacific Railway.
- October 26 – The Key System begins operating their first streetcar-ferry service, the Berkeley line in Berkeley, California.
- October 31 – The Purdue Wreck, Indianapolis, Indiana, USA: A Cleveland, Cincinnati, Chicago & St Louis Railway football special carrying the Purdue University football team and fans to the annual game with Indiana University collides with a coal train. Fourteen of the team and three other passengers are killed.

=== November events ===
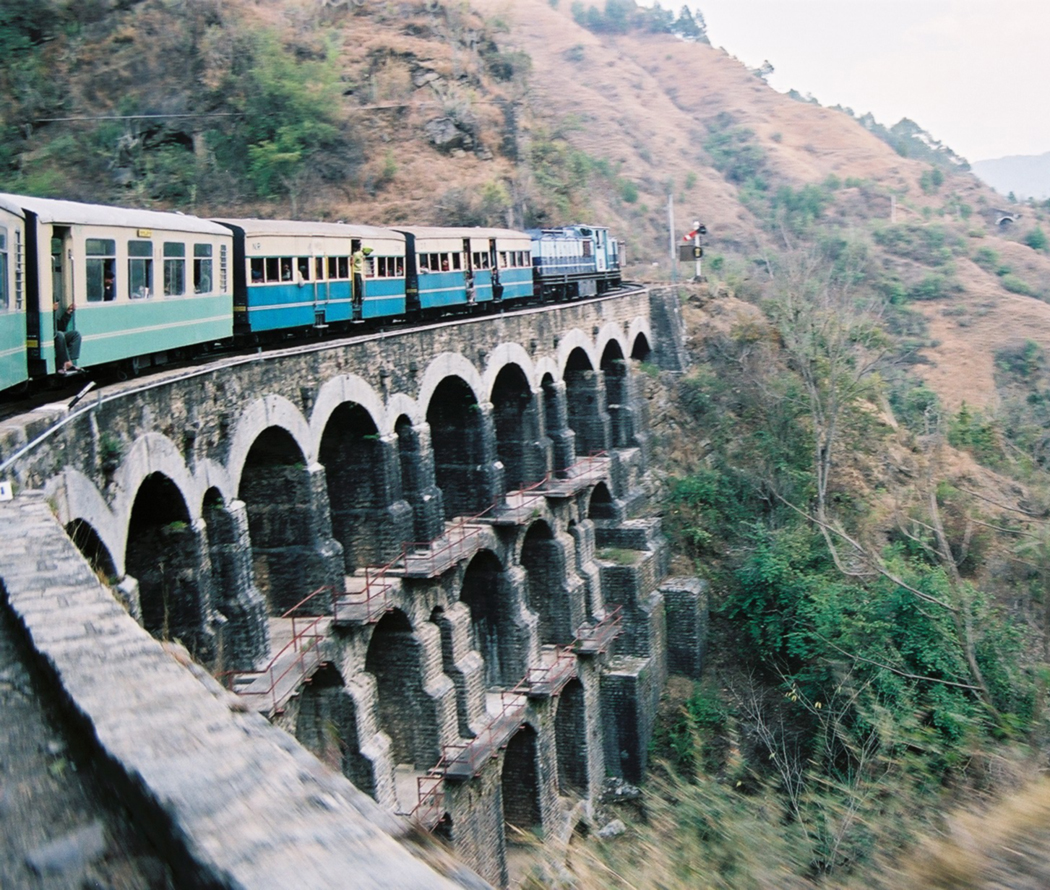
Kalka-Shimla Railway

- November 9 – The 2 ft 6 in (762 mm) gauge Kalka-Shimla Railway opens in India.

=== December events ===
- December 14 – The New York, New Haven and Hartford introduces the all-parlor car Merchants Limited between Boston and New York City.

=== Unknown date events ===
- The British Engineering Standards Committee draws up specifications for eight standard steam locomotive designs for the broad gauge Indian Railways.
- Southern Pacific Railroad gains 50% control of the Pacific Electric system in Los Angeles, California.
- The Wilkes-Barre & Hazleton Railway opens as the first railroad to have a guarded third rail.
- The provisions of the Railroad Safety Appliance Act, enacted in 1893, are extended to include all railroad cars whether or not the cars themselves are used in interchange service.
- Atchison, Topeka & Santa Fe Railway introduces the first 2-10-2 compound locomotives (built by Baldwin Locomotive Works) into service.
- Edward Harriman becomes president of the Union Pacific.
- George Whale succeeds Francis William Webb as Chief Mechanical Engineer of the London & North Western Railway.

== Births ==
=== April births ===
- April 10 – Edward T. Reidy, last president of Chicago Great Western Railway 1957–1968.

== Deaths ==
=== March deaths ===
- March 29 – Gustavus Franklin Swift, founder of Swift & Company which pioneered the use of refrigerator cars in late 19th century America (born 1839)

=== July deaths ===
- July 27 – Frederick Kimball, American civil engineer who was instrumental in the formation of Norfolk & Western (born 1844).

=== Unknown date deaths ===
- John Elfreth Watkins, railroad civil engineer and first curator for the Smithsonian Institution's railroad artifacts including John Bull.
