= LSWR 700 class =

Class of steam locomotives

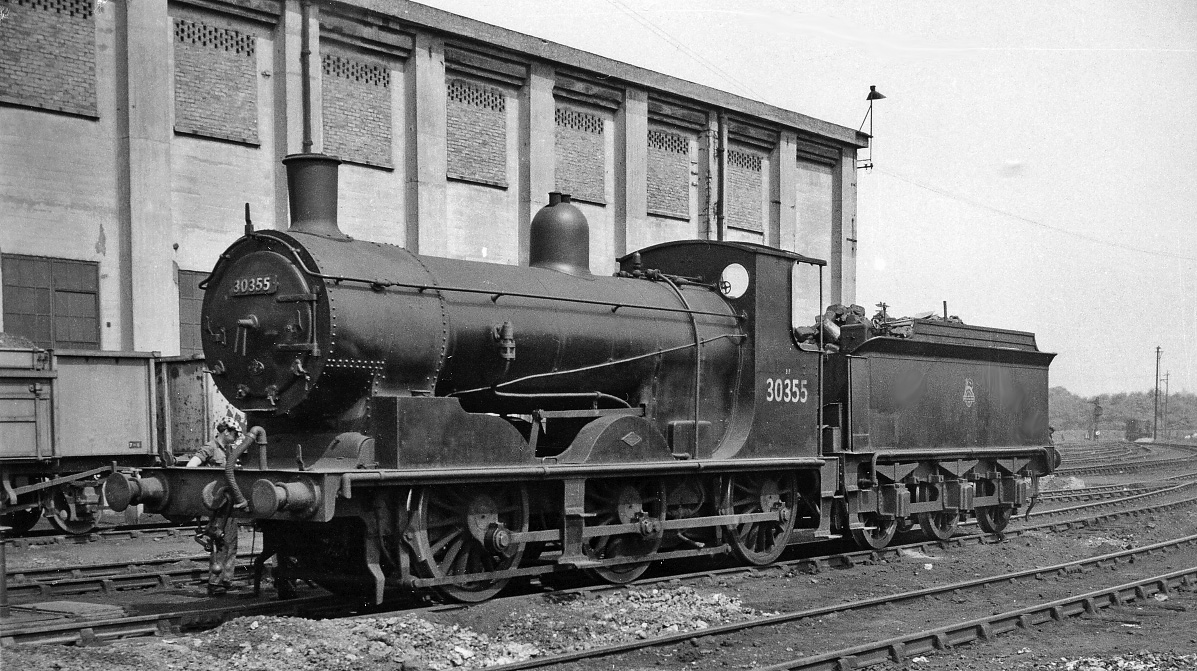
- No. 30355 on Feltham locomotive depot, May 1959
Type and origin
- Power type: Steam
- Designer: Dugald Drummond
- Builder: Dübs & Co.
- Serial number: 3510–3538
- Build date: March–June 1897
- Total produced: 30
Specifications
- Configuration
  - Whyte: 0-6-0
  - UIC: C n2
- Driver dia.: 61 in (1.549 m)
- Loco weight: 42.75 long tons (43.44 t)
- Fuel type: Coal
- Fuel capacity: 4 long tons (4.1 t)
- Water cap.: 3,500 imp gal (16,000 L)
- Firebox
  - Grate area: 20.25 sq ft (1.881 m^{2})
- Boiler pressure: 175 psi (1.21 MPa)
- Heating surface
  - Firebox: 124 sq ft (11.5 m^{2})
  - Tubes: 1,068 sq ft (99.2 m^{2})
- Cylinder size: 18 1/2 in × 26 in (470 mm × 660 mm)
Performance figures
- Tractive effort: 22,487 lbf (100.03 kN)
Career
- Operators: LSWR, Southern, British Rail
- Power class: LSWR / SR: C
- Number in class: 30
- Nicknames: Black Motor
- Disposition: All rebuilt with superheaters

LSWR 700 class (after superheating)
Type and origin
- Only details that changed are shown here
- Power type: Steam
Specifications
- Configuration
  - UIC: C h2
- Loco weight: 46.70 long tons (47.45 t)
- Boiler pressure: 180 psi (1.24 MPa)
- Heating surface
  - Firebox: 117 sq ft (10.9 m^{2})
  - Tubes: 860 sq ft (80 m^{2})
- Superheater
  - Type: Eastleigh (11); later all Maunsell
  - Heating area: Eastleigh: 167 sq ft (15.5 m^{2}); Maunsell 182 sq ft (16.9 m^{2})
- Cylinder size: 19 in × 26 in (480 mm × 660 mm)
Performance figures
- Tractive effort: 23,500 lbf (105 kN)
Career
- Power class: LSWR / SR: C BR: 4F, later 3F
- Withdrawn: 1957-1962
- Disposition: All scrapped

The LSWR 700 class was a class of 30 0-6-0 steam locomotives designed for freight work. The class was designed by Dugald Drummond in 1897 for the London and South Western Railway in England and built by Dübs and Company at that company's Queen's Park works at Polmadie, Glasgow, Scotland.

== Overview ==
The class was originally numbered 687–716 but the year after delivery numbers 702–716 were given new numbers vacated by engines that had been withdrawn. The locomotives gained the nickname 'Black Motor' early in their career. They were well designed and had few major modifications during the existence of the fleet – the exception being fitted with superheaters from 1919 to 1929, which required the fitting of an extended smokebox. They shared many standard parts with Drummond's other designs (including sharing boilers with the M7 class).

== Construction and numbering ==
Year	Builder	Quantity	LSWR numbers
1897	Dübs & Co. 3510–3539	30	687–716

Nos. 702–716 were renumbered by the LSWR between June and August 1898, becoming 306, 308, 309, 315, 317, 325–327, 339, 346, 350, 352, 355, 368, 459 respectively. In June 1912, no. 459 was renumbered again, to 316.

Soon after the locomotives passed to Southern Railway (SR) ownership, their LSWR numbers were prefixed "E" to denote Eastleigh Works - this was done to distinguish similarly numbered locomotives from the other constituents of the SR; thus, LSWR No. 687 became SR No. E687. These prefixes were dropped from mid-1931. In the meantime, there had been a proposal (prepared in March 1927) to renumber some classes into continuous blocks: the 700 class were allocated the series E336–9, E369–379 and E686–701 but none were actually renumbered, and the plan was cancelled in December 1927.

== Ownership changes ==
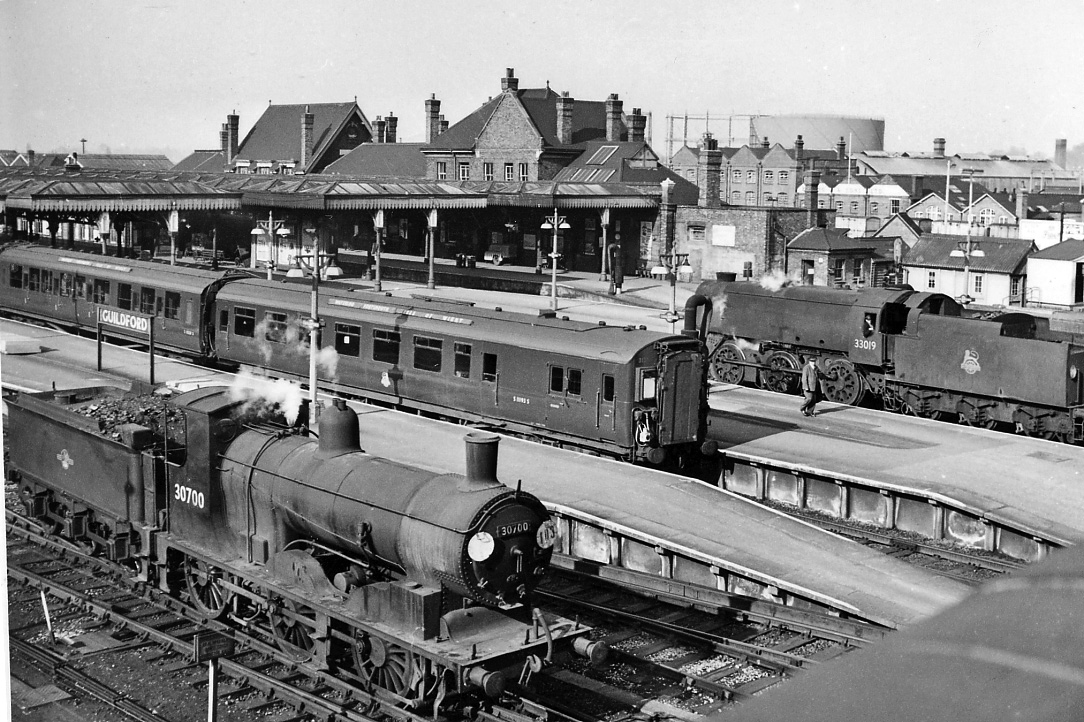
700 class No. 30700 at Guildford Station, April 1958

The 700s remained intact as a class through SR ownership from 1923 to 1947. The locomotives passed to British Railways (BR) in 1948, who increased the former LSWR/SR numbers by 30000.

== Accidents and incidents ==
- On 9 August 1957, locomotive No. 30688 was in a head-on collision with a train formed of two electric multiple units at Staines, Middlesex after the latter departed against a danger signal.

== Withdrawal ==
The first to be withdrawn was No. 30688 in September 1957, with the second, No. 30352, following in June 1959 and then the third, No. 30687, in September 1960. Withdrawals then started en masse in 1961, and was completed in December 1962. No examples of the class have been preserved.

Table of withdrawals
Year	Quantity in service at start of year	Quantity withdrawn	Locomotive numbers	Notes
1957	30	1	30688	
1958	29	0	–	
1959	29	1	30352	
1960	28	1	30687	
1961	27	10	30308/17/27/55, 30691/93–94/96/99, 30701	
1962	17	17	30306/09/15–16/25–26/39/46/50/68, 30689–90/92/95/97–98, 30700	

== Models ==
Hornby produce models of the 700 class in both Southern Railway livery and British Railway livery including an example of the engine in the Return from Dunkirk train pack. A model of the class was originally produced by OO Works.
