= LSWR C8 class =

Type and origin
- Power type: Steam
- Designer: Dugald Drummond
- Builder: LSWR, at Nine Elms
- Build date: 1898
- Total produced: 10
Specifications
- Configuration
  - Whyte: 4-4-0
- Gauge: 4 ft 8 1/2 in (1,435 mm)
- Leading dia.: 3 ft 7 in (1.092 m)
- Driver dia.: 6 ft 7 in (2.007 m)
- Length: 54 ft 11 in (16.74 m), later 56 ft 5 1/4 in (17.202 m)
- Loco weight: 46 long tons 16 cwt (104,800 lb or 47.6 t)
- Fuel type: Coal
- Fuel capacity: 4 long tons (4.1 t; 4.5 short tons), later 5 long tons (5.1 t; 5.6 short tons)
- Water cap.: 3,500 imp gal (16,000 L; 4,200 US gal), later 4,000 imp gal (18,000 L; 4,800 US gal)
- Boiler pressure: 175 lbf/in^{2} (1.21 MPa)
- Cylinders: Two, inside
- Cylinder size: 18 1/2 in × 26 in (470 mm × 660 mm)
Performance figures
- Tractive effort: 16,755 lbf (74.53 kN)
Career
- Operators: London and South Western Railway; Southern Railway
- Power class: LSWR/SR: I
- Locale: Great Britain
- Withdrawn: 1933–38
- Disposition: All scrapped

The LSWR C8 class was the first class of 4-4-0 express steam locomotives designed by Dugald Drummond for the London and South Western Railway and introduced in 1898. According to Dendy Marshall they "were of orthodox design, very much like engines which Drummond had put on the Caledonian". Dendy Marshall gives few other details, except to say that they were numbered 290-299 and had 18 in × 26 in (460 mm × 660 mm) cylinders. H.C. Casserley states that they were very similar to the Caledonian Railway 66 class.

They used a similar boiler to the Drummond M7 0-4-4T and 700 class 0-6-0 engines built for the LSWR. They originally used a similar tender to the 700 class, but these were later replaced with Drummond's eight-wheeled bogie "watercart" tenders. They were not particularly good steamers, due to their firebox being too small. None were ever superheated, and they were withdrawn after service lives of 35 to 40 years. In November 1898, No. 291 worked a train carrying the Grand Duke and Duchess Serge of Russia from Windsor through to Dover on the LCDR.

== Withdrawal ==
Table of withdrawals
Year	Quantity in service at start of year	Quantity withdrawn	Locomotive numbers	Notes
1933	10	2	290/294	
1934	8	0	–	
1935	8	4	291/293/295–296	
1936	4	2	292/297	
1937	2	1	299	
1938	1	1	298	
