= LSWR T9 class =

British steam locomotive

LSWR T9 class "Greyhound"
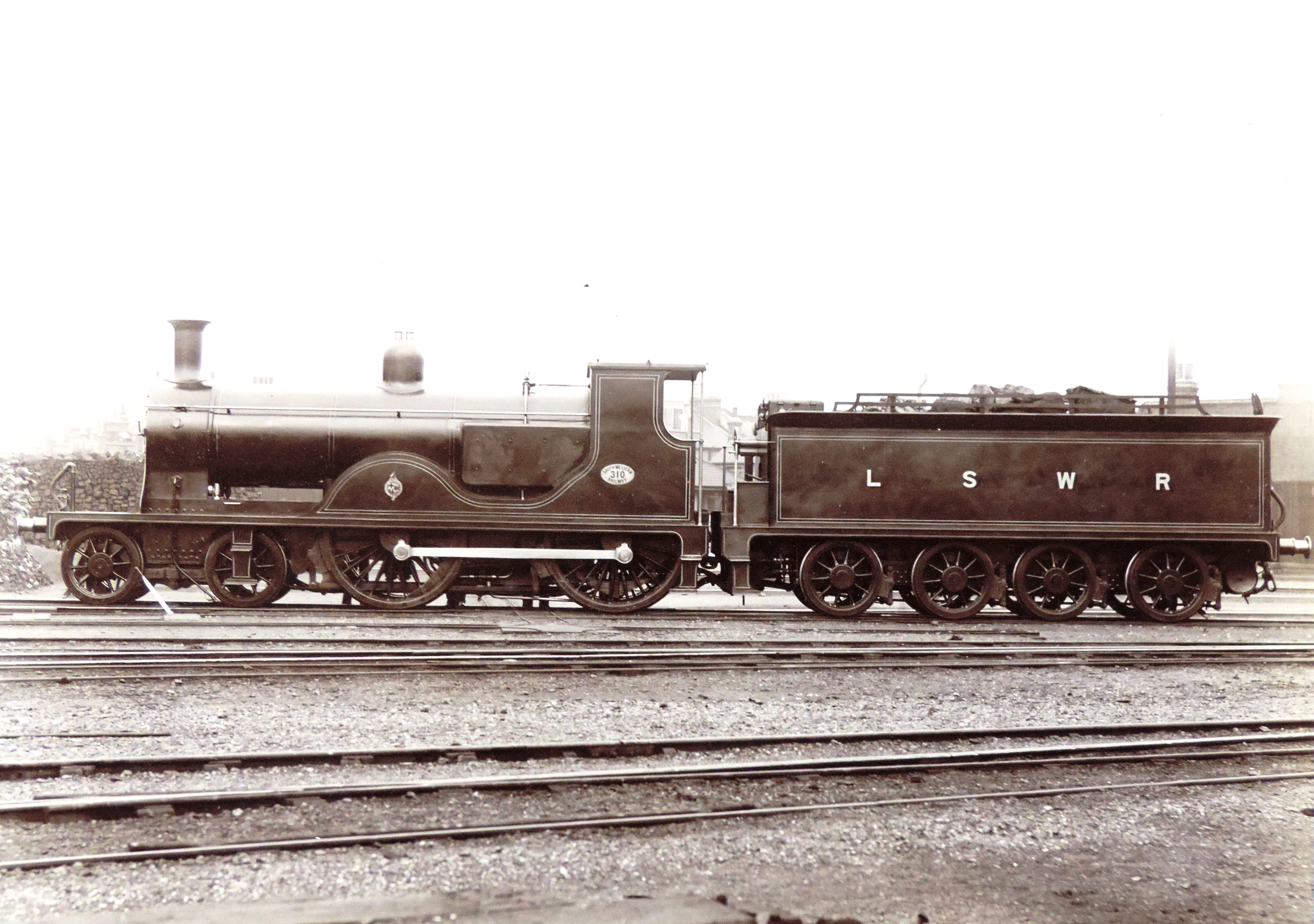
- LSWR T9 no. 310
Type and origin
- Power type: Steam
- Designer: Dugald Drummond
- Builder: LSWR Nine Elms Works (35); Dübs & Co. (31)
- Serial number: Dübs 3746–3775, 4038
- Build date: 1899–1901
- Total produced: 66
Specifications
- Configuration
  - Whyte: 4-4-0
- Gauge: 4 ft 8 1/2 in (1,435 mm)
- Leading dia.: 3 ft 7 in (1,092 mm)
- Driver dia.: 6 ft 7 in (2,007 mm)
- Length: 63 ft 9 in (19.43 m)
- Loco weight: First batch: 46 long tons 4 cwt (103,500 lb or 46.9 t); second and third batches: 48 long tons 17 cwt (109,400 lb or 49.6 t)
- Fuel type: Coal
- Fuel capacity: 5 long tons 0 cwt (11,200 lb or 5.1 t)
- Water cap.: 4,000 imp gal (18,200 L; 4,800 US gal)
- Boiler pressure: 175 lbf/in^{2} (1.21 MPa)
- Cylinders: Two, inside
- Cylinder size: 19 in × 26 in (483 mm × 660 mm)
- Valve gear: Stephenson
Performance figures
- Tractive effort: 17,670 lbf (78.60 kN)
Career
- Operators: LSWR » SR » BR
- Nicknames: Greyhounds
- Withdrawn: 1951–1963
- Preserved: No. 30120 in National Collection
- Disposition: One preserved, remainder scrapped

The London and South Western Railway T9 class is a class of 66 4-4-0 steam locomotive designed for express passenger work by Dugald Drummond and introduced to services on the LSWR in 1899. One example has been preserved after British Railways ownership. They were given the nickname of "Greyhounds" due to their speed, up to 85 miles per hour (137 km/h), and reliability.

== Background ==
Intended for express passenger work in South-West England, 66 were eventually built and saw several improvements throughout their service careers. The class operated until 1963 when the last example, No 30120, was withdrawn. 30120 was preserved by the National Railway Museum and is currently on loan to the Swanage Railway.

== Construction history ==
The design spawned from the relative failure of Drummond's C8 class of 1898, utilising many lessons learned from this design. A larger boiler was implemented, and such confidence was placed in Drummond's design that an order of 50 locomotives was placed straight off the drawing board. Large fireboxes and Stephenson link valve gear ensured a free-steaming locomotive.

=== Builders ===
Construction was shared between the LSWR's Nine Elms Locomotive Works, London and Dübs and Company of Glasgow. Twenty were built at Nine Elms and 30 by Dübs. These were constructed between 1899 and 1900 and supplied with six wheel tenders. A second batch was ordered, and 15 more were constructed at Nine Elms, while a final, solitary example was constructed at Dübs and Company for the Glasgow Exhibition of 1901. Detail improvements on this final batch were a wider cab and revised wheel splasher that hid the 'throw' of the coupling rod, with cross-water tubes fitted into the firebox. This was an attempt to increase the heat surface area of the water, which was achieved, though at a cost in boiler complexity. This batch was also fitted with the Drummond "watercart" eight-wheel tender for longer running, whilst the previous was retrofitted with the design.

=== Construction table ===
Year	Order	Builder	Quantity	LSWR numbers	Notes
1899	G9	Nine Elms	10	113–122	
1899	K9	Nine Elms	5	280–284	
1899	—	Dübs & Co. 3746–3775	30	702–719, 721–732	
1900	O9	Nine Elms	5	285–289	
1900	T9	Nine Elms	5	300–304	
1901	X9	Nine Elms	5	305, 307, 310–312	
1901	G10	Nine Elms	5	313, 314, 336–338	
1901	—	Dübs & Co. 4038	1	773	renumbered 733 in 1924

== Urie's modifications ==
Upon Drummond's death in 1912, his successor, Robert Urie, supplied the class with superheaters, and from 1922, the entire class was so treated. Their sterling performance as a class precluded any further modifications, apart from the removal of the cross-water tubes, an enlarged smokebox, addition of a stovepipe chimney, and an increase of the cylinder bore to 19 inches (480 mm). These had been completed by 1929.

== Livery and numbering ==
=== LSWR and Southern ===
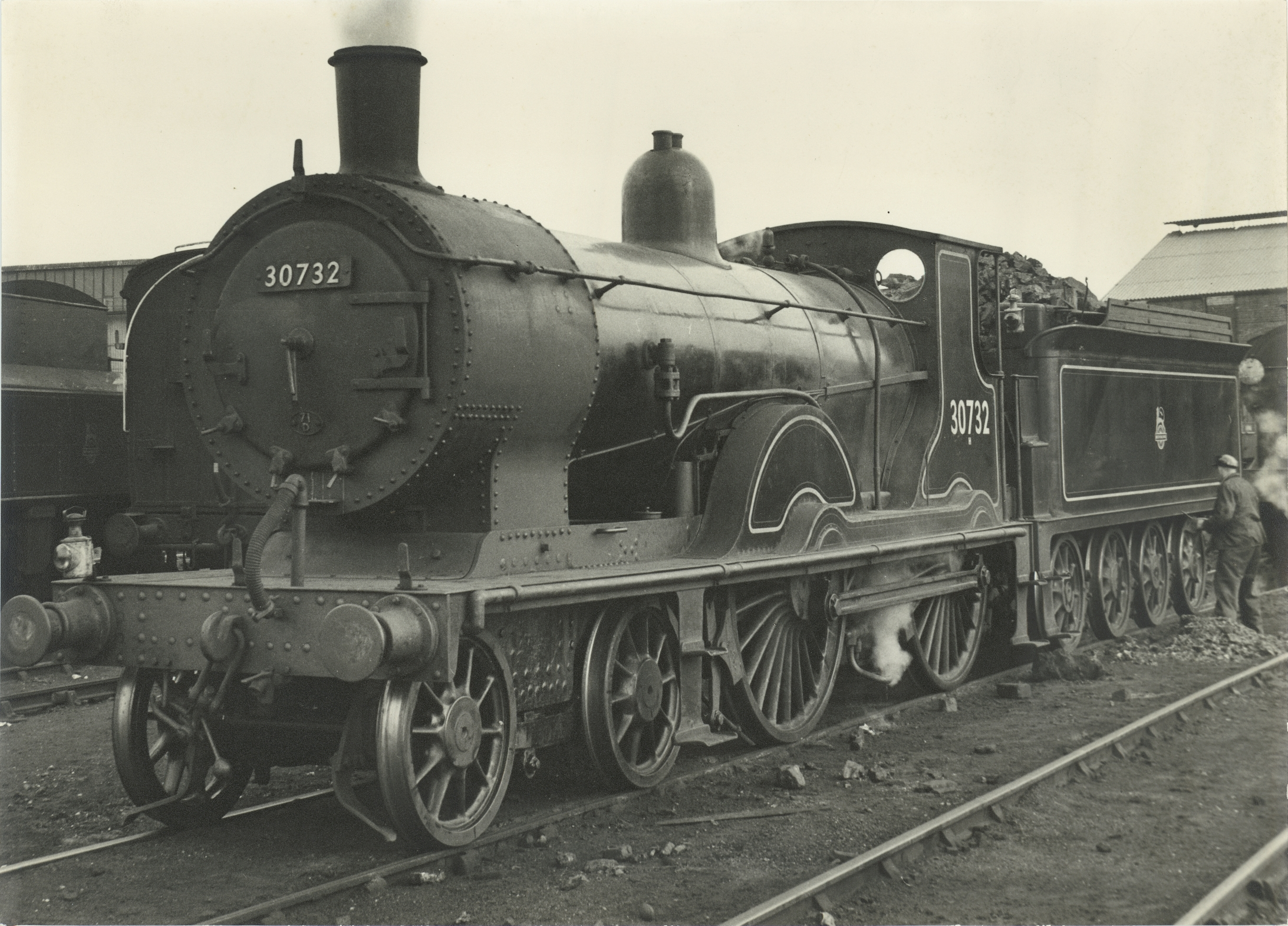
London and South Western Railway (LSWR) Type T9, 30732

Livery under the LSWR was Drummond's LSWR Passenger Sage Green, with purple-brown edging and black and white lining. Under Southern Railway ownership from grouping in 1923, the locomotives were outshopped in Richard Maunsell's darker version of the LSWR Sage Green with yellow lettering on the tender, with black and white lining.

This livery was continued under Bulleid despite his experimentations with Malachite Green, though the 'Southern' lettering on the tender was changed to the 'Sunshine Yellow' style. During the Second World War, members of the class outshopped from overhaul were turned out in wartime black.

The class was haphazardly numbered by the LSWR. The Nine Elms batch was numbered 113 to 122 and 280 to 289, whilst the Glasgow batch was allocated 702 to 719 and 721 to 732. A final locomotive, 773, was constructed in Glasgow. With one exception, numbering under the Southern retained the LSWR allocations.

=== Post-1948 (nationalisation) ===
Livery after Nationalisation was initially Southern livery with 'British Railways' on the tender, and an 'S' prefix on the number. The class was subsequently outshopped in BR Mixed Traffic Black with red and white lining, with the BR crest on the tender.

Locomotive numbering was per BR standard practice, from 30113 to 30122; 30280–30289; 30300–30305;30307;30310-30314; 30336–30338; 30702–30719; and 30721–30733. Numbering was based upon the batches built with the addition of 30000 to the SR numbers. However, thirteen of the locomotives had been withdrawn by the end of 1948, and this resulted in gaps in the numerical sequence.

== Operational details ==
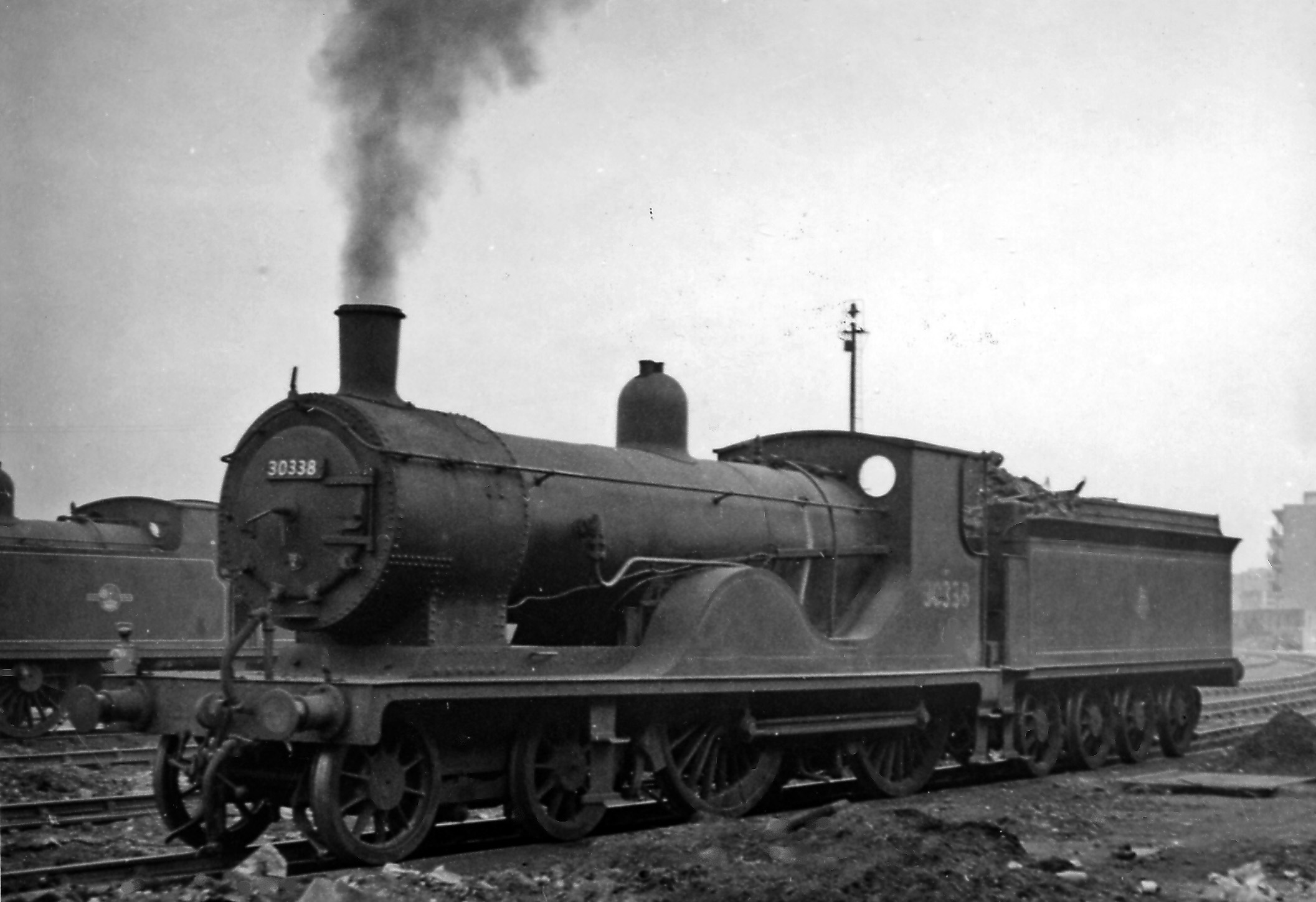
No. 30338 came from the second series with wider splashers. Nine Elms depot 1958

The T9 Class locomotives were well liked by their crews, and gained the nickname Greyhounds early in their operational career due to the good turn of speed that these locomotives were capable of on LSWR expresses. Indeed, even in old age they were still capable of speed in excess of 80 mph. They proved of great use west of Salisbury where their light axle loadings and short frame lengths were better suited to the tight curves of the Southern's Western Section. In 1947, 13 locomotives were converted to oil burning. This experiment ended in 1948, and all locomotives involved were withdrawn

LSWR/SR 119 (BR 30119) was used by the Southern Railway and early British Railways as a Royal engine and as such was painted in malachite green livery

The class remained intact throughout Southern Railway ownership 1923–1947 and 20 still remained on BR's books in 1959, being used on lighter duties in the westcountry. All, however, had been withdrawn by 1963 upon the advent of the BR Modernisation Plan.

Table of withdrawals
Year	Quantity in service at start of year	Quantity withdrawn	Locomotive numbers	Notes
1951	66	20	30113–16/18/21–22, 30280–81/86, 30303/05/14, 30704/13–14/16/22–23/31	
1952	46	8	30119, 30302/07/11–12, 30703/25/33	
1953	38	1	30336	
1954	37	1	30282	
1956	36	1	30728	
1957	35	4	30283, 30304, 30708/30	
1958	31	7	30284–85, 30337, 30705/12/21/27	
1959	24	10	30289, 30301/10, 30702/06/10–11/24/26/32	
1960	14	1	30288	
1961	13	12	30117, 30287, 30300/13/38, 30707/09/15/17–19/29	
1963	1	1	30120	Preserved

== Accidents and incidents ==
In 1928, locomotive 337 was derailed on the approach to Portsmouth Harbour, blocking all lines.

== Preservation ==
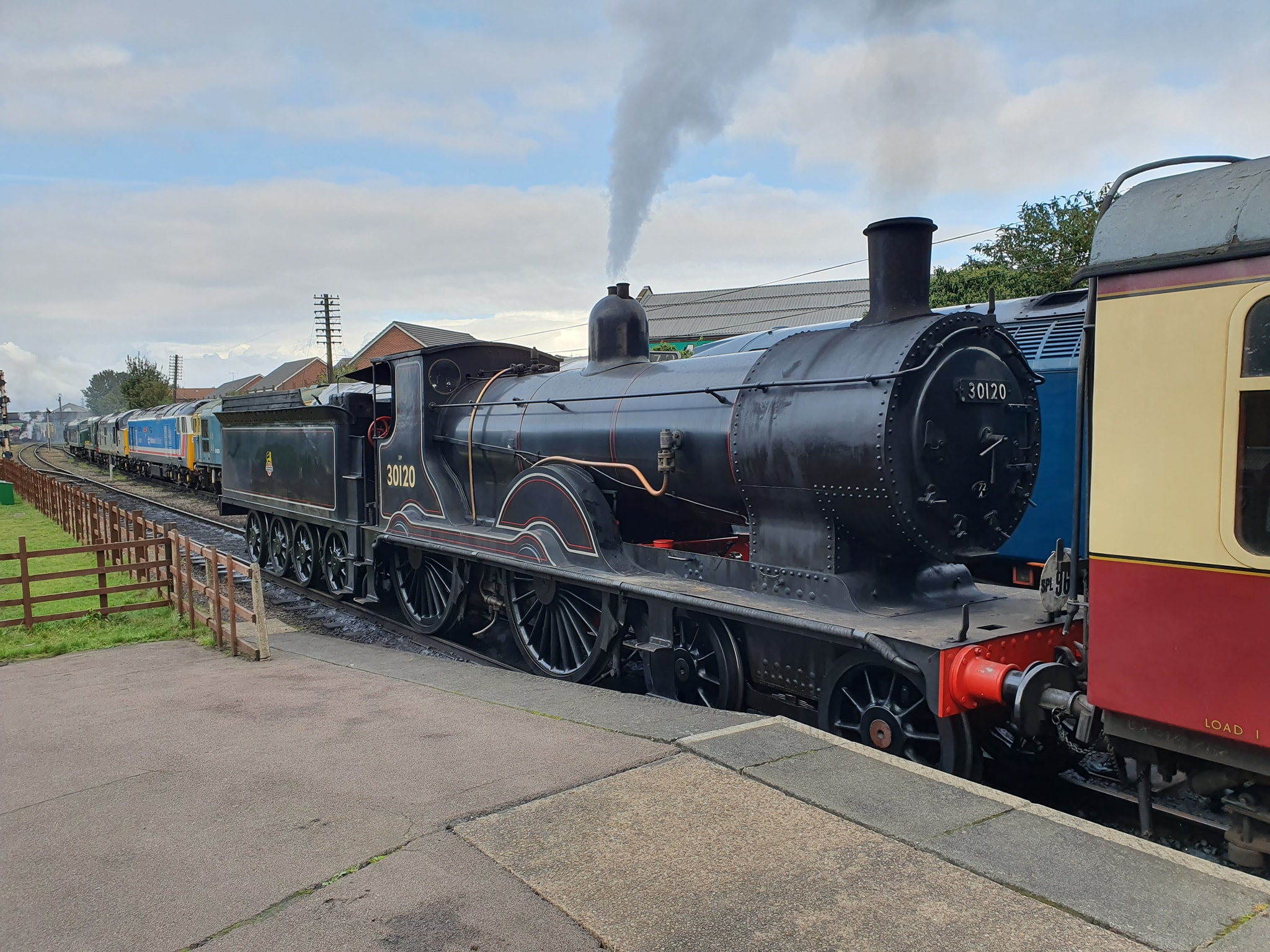
T9 30120 on the Great Central Railway in 2019

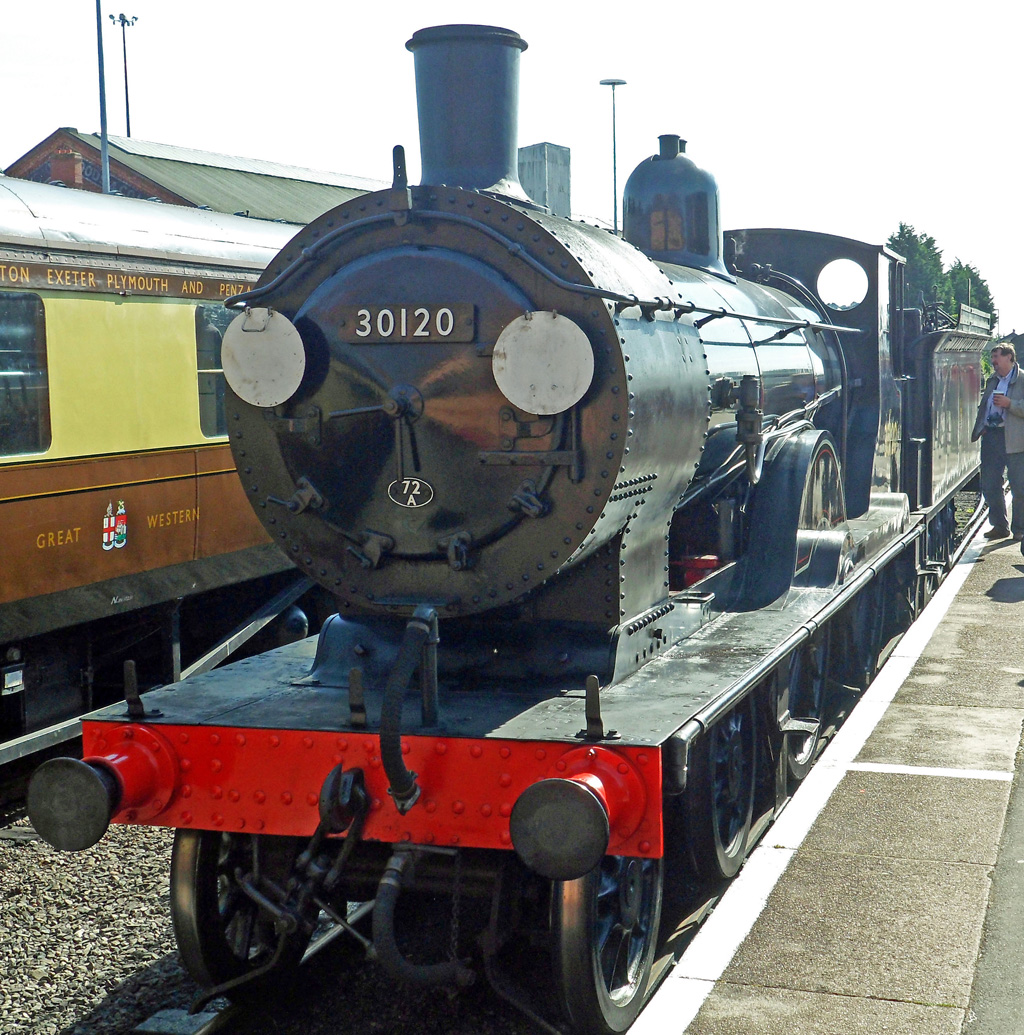
Preserved T9 30120 in BR lined black livery operating at the Severn Valley Railway in 2012

One engine, LSWR/SR 120 (BR 30120), was earmarked for preservation as part of the National Collection by the British Railways Board and saved for the National Railway Museum. Withdrawn from Exmouth Junction shed, Exeter in 1961, it remained in capital stock. In March 1962 it was outshopped from Eastleigh Works following a heavy casual repair and returned to service in LSWR green working ordinary services as well as special trains. It was finally withdrawn from capital stock in July 1963 but continued to work special trains until October of that year.

Following lengthy periods in store at Fratton, Stratford, Preston Park, Tyseley and York, it was again overhauled in the early 1980s on the Mid Hants Railway and returned to steam in 1983. However, because of the steep gradients on the Mid Hants, it moved to the Swanage Railway in 1991 and remained there until its boiler certificate expired in 1993. It then moved to the Bluebell Railway, where it remained as a static exhibit on public display and under cover, until 1 February 2008. It then moved to the Bodmin and Wenford Railway, and was returned to steam in August 2010 following a heavy overhaul, including repairs to the cylinder block at the Flour Mill Workshop in the Forest of Dean. It was repainted in early British Railways lined black colour scheme and was regularly used on passenger trains at Bodmin. From June to December 2015, the locomotive was again loaned to the Swanage Railway and had guested at the Mid Hants Railway in February 2016 before returning to Bodmin.

By December 2016, the locomotive had been transferred to the Battlefield Line in Leicestershire on hire from the Bodmin and Wenford Railway to be one of two locomotives working the passenger services on this railway. In July 2017, further repairs to the cylinder block became necessary. These were successfully carried out by the Swanage Railway following which the locomotive was transferred to Swanage where it remains on loan from the National Railway Museum. The boiler certificate expired in September 2020 and the locomotive was put into store awaiting an assessment of the condition of the boiler with a view to the possibility of a return to steam. The National Railway Museum approved the Swanage Railway's proposal for the 4-4-0's overhaul in May 2026. Work is being split between Herston Works for the bottom end and the Flour Mill in the Forest of Dean for both the boiler and tender. The overhaul is expected to cost £750,000 and will include the replacement of 30120's cylinder block. Target date for completion is 2029. The locomotive is to be outshopped in Southern olive green on completion.
