= Diesel shunter =

A Diesel shunter is a diesel locomotive used for shunting or switching. See:

- Diesel locomotive
- Switcher locomotive
- GWR diesel shunters
- LMS diesel shunters
