= Martin Mill military railway =

Railway near Dover in Kent, United Kingdom

The Martin Mill Military Railway was a standard gauge railway near Dover in Kent that served the gun emplacements on the cliffs north of Dover during World War II.

== History ==
The railway had its origins back in 1899, when a standard gauge mineral line was built from Martin Mill Station to a position on the cliffs on the northeast end of Dover from which material was sent down the cliff to allow expansion of the harbour. Originally it was sent down via a chute, but soon a funicular railway was installed. The railway was known as Pearson's railway after the main contractor, Messrs S. Pearson & Son, building the harbour facilities. In 1902 an enquiry was held under the Light Railways Act 1896 to consider building an electric tramway from Dover to St Marageret's Bay 3 miles across the cliffs. This eventually led to the Dover, St Margaret's, and Martin Mill Light Railway Order 1909 being granted in 1909. Also in about 1909, a switchback route was cut into the cliffs allowing a rail link between the mineral railway and the harbour below.

In spite of the light railway order for the electric tramway between Dover and St Margarets, this never came about due to a number of difficulties, one being the War Department rifle ranges on the cliffs. The light railway order had a five-year span, but WW1 broke out before the end of the five-year period, so the Light Railway Company was able to get an extension after the war. However the numerous difficulties, objections, and finance issues continued to prevent it from being built and eventually the track on the Pearson's Railway was lifted in 1937, although the Dover St. Margarets and Martin Mill Light Railway Company continued to exist.

During WW2 the cliffs North of Dover were chosen as the ideal site for heavy gun batteries to control the channel. To serve this a military railways was built, with much of the track from Martin Mill station relaid along the route of Pearson's railway, and from this two new rail branches were laid running to the northeast to serve the gun batteries. The military railway track was removed shortly after the war, and so is missing from maps of the time. Dover District council has a heritage planning map on which its location has been traced.

After WW2 the railway reverted to the original light railway company, who still had aspirations to open a light railway even though the original light railway order dated back to 1909. However this was not to be, and the company started the winding up process in 1950.

== Guns and batteries served by the railway ==
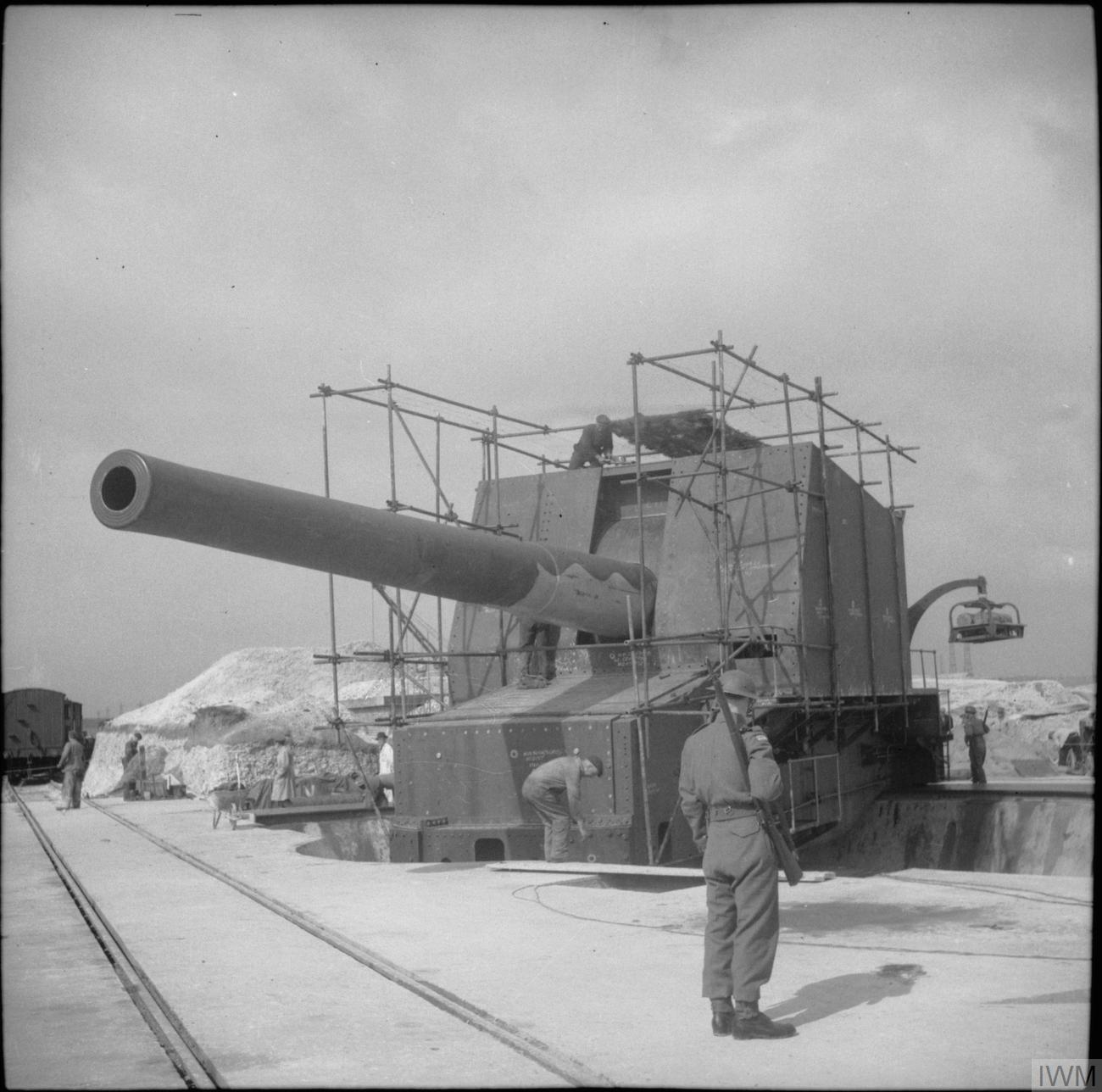
"Clem" or "Jane" near completion in May 1942 - rail spur for barrel change runs in front

The northernmost of the two lines laid by the military served the guns named "Winnie" and "Pooh", which were 14" naval gun emplacements capable of hitting targets on the other side of the channel, mainly the German guns on the French coast aimed at Britain. Winnie was the first UK gun to land a shell on mainland Europe in August 1940 in reply to the German long range guns that started bombarding Dover on the evening of 22 August. The sister gun, Pooh, was active from March 1941. This branch of the railway also had some firing spurs for the use of rail mounted guns (see below). There was also a branch off this line to another battery near the RAF Camp.

The southernmost of the two military lines served the guns "Clem" and "Jane" (the Wanstone Battery), which were active from August 1942, and the railway extended beyond them to the location of the experimental hypersonic gun "Bruce" (which was never used in combat), which was near the Dover Patrol Monument. At each of the guns the line ran behind the guns to supply munitions and cordite, and there was a line immediately in front of the guns to allow barrel changes. This southernmost branch also had firing spurs for the large rail mounted guns.

The rail mounted guns were large relics from WW1 (see BL 14-inch railway gun). During WW1 they had 14 inch barrels, an obsolete type scrapped in 1926, but the rail carriages and mounts were kept in storage between the wars. In 1939, the stored gun carriages were refurbished and then fitted with 13.5" naval surplus barrels. The rail carriages bore the original WW1 names of Gladiator and Scene-Shifter when discovered, from the accounts of Major Cleeve, who was tasked by Churchill with the organisation of heavy home defence artillery. A third gun, Piece-Maker, is not named in his account of the discovery of the guns in storage at RAOC Chilwell, but is also most likely a WW1 name. It seems the three rail guns on the Martin Mill Military Railway were kept under cover in either the Southern Railway's Guston or Lydden railway tunnels. The guns required very strong track and substantial ground anchors when fired due to the power of the recoil, and they had limited traverse, so they were fired from specially made curved railway spurs. The position on the curved track dictated the firing direction. In 1941 two of these guns were moved into position to fire on Calais 22 miles away and one gun jumped back 6 feet with the recoil and repositioning took some time, so firm anchoring was essential for a decent firing rate. Other smaller rail guns of similar vintage (9.2" guns and 12" howitzers) were deployed inland on rural railways to shell British beaches in the event of a seaborne invasion so were only used during exercises (with one exception, where a 9.2" rail gun at Folkestone West was used to fire at E-boats in the Channel, and in doing so de-railed itself)., but the rail guns on the Martin Mill military railway were larger and played an active role as part of the coastal battery.

The fixed gun emplacements were heavily camouflaged, and dummy gun emplacements were less well camouflaged. On the other side of the channel, the German large guns were instead built into massively strong fortifications.

== Locomotives ==
The line was entirely worked by diesel-electric shunting locomotives requisitioned from the LMS (London, Midland and Scottish Railway) and SR (Southern Railway), three from the SR and six from the LMS. This was relatively new technology for the mainline railways, but the smoke from a steam locomotive on the cliffs would have been visible and could have given the guns' positions away to the batteries on the other side of the channel.

The three Southern Railway locomotives were the three experimental diesel-electric shunters delivered in late 1937, which had been on trial at Norwood Marshalling Yard. These had English Electric diesel engines and traction motors. They were requisitioned early in the war, and were released back to the Southern Railway in 1945. Under British Rail in 1948 they were designated as Class D3/12.

The War Department requisitioned many diesel shunting locomotives from the LMS in 1940. The details of the LMS locos used on the Martin Mill Railway are unclear, but it is on record that LMS 7063 failed in Guston Tunnel and had to be recovered. As the tunnel was a refuge for the rail guns, it is possible it was operating on the Military Railway. This loco was made by Armstrong-Whitworth and had an Armstrong-Sulzer 6LTD22 diesel engine. All ten locomotives of this class were requisitioned in 1940–1941. More likely to be used were the LMS locos 7069-7078 built by Hawthorne Leslie to English Electric design (later designated British Rail Class D3/6) - these were very similar to the 3 Southern Railway locos - and 7 of the 10 locomotives built were requisitioned by the War Department. Also likely candidates are LMS 7100–7109, also with English Electric engines (later designated British Rail Class D3/7). These were loaned to the War Department in 1941, and sold to them the following year.

Whilst working on the military railway the locomotives were stabled at the shed in Martin Mill railway station Yard.
