= Southern Railway diesels =

The Southern Railway built six Diesel locomotives. Three shunters were completed in 1937. The three mainline locomotives were completed after Nationalisation in 1948 by British Railways.

== Shunting locomotives ==
The Southern Railway built three shunters in 1937, numbered 1–3. These became British Rail 15201–15203, and were later classified as British Rail Class D3/12. Twenty-six similar locomotives were built in 1949–1951 after nationalisation. They were numbered 15211–15236, and were later classified as British Rail Class 12.

== Mainline locomotives ==
The Southern designed a prototype mainline diesel-electric locomotive. Three were built, although none were finished before nationalisation. They were numbered 10201–10203, and later classified as British Rail Class D16/2.

== See also ==
- GWR diesel shunters
- LMS diesel shunters
- LNER internal combustion locomotives
- List of British Rail classes
