= Feltham marshalling yard =

Large railway marshalling yard

Coordinates: 51.45°N 0.39°W

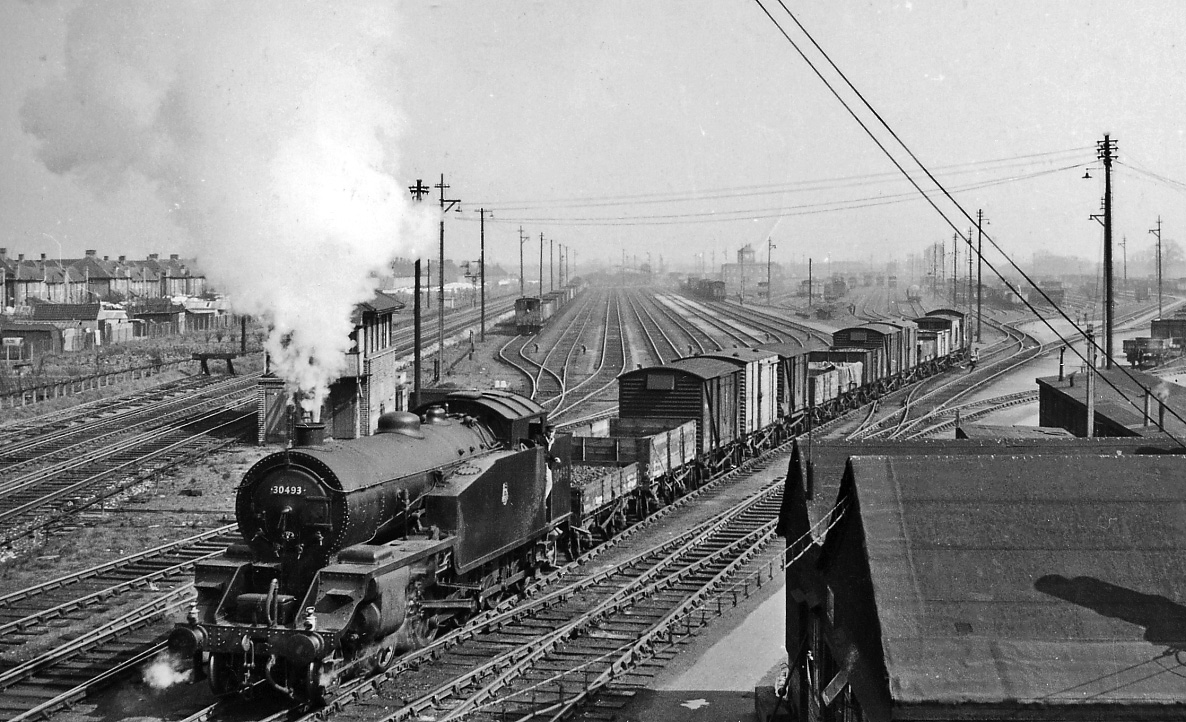
Feltham marshalling yard in 1958, with a G16 engine shunting

Feltham marshalling yard, also known as Feltham hump yard, was a large railway marshalling yard designed for the concentration of freight traffic to and from South West London, and for transfer to other marshalling yards in London. It was built on the Waterloo–Reading line. It opened in 1918 and was closed by British Railways on 6 January 1969.

Part of the site is now being rebuilt to stable Class 701 electric multiple unit trains for South Western Railway (SWR).

== History ==
During the early years of the twentieth century, the London and South Western Railway (LSWR) experienced a substantial growth in its freight traffic to and from London, and for transfer to other railways. By 1910 this traffic was beginning to overwhelm the existing facilities at Nine Elms. Plans were therefore made for a hump marshaling yard and motive power depot at Feltham. The purchase of 41.5 acres (16.8 hectares) of land was confirmed in 1911, with additional land being purchased in 1915. This location gave excellent access to the company main lines as well as direct links to the Great Western Railway and London and North Western Railway, and to the Midland Railway, Great Northern Railway and Great Eastern Railway via the North London line. The plans were confirmed on 30 March 1916, and work started soon after with the help of around 200 German prisoners of war. The first nine 'down' sidings were opened on 9 December 1917 and the remainder by 2 October 1921.

The yard was completed in 1921 and incorporated two gravity shunting humps and equipped with the latest automated technology including electrically operated points, and widespread use of track circuits. In 1929, the new SR Z class shunter were trialled at Feltham before entering service across the Southern network. With 32 miles (51 km) of track, (the longest siding being 1,662 feet or 507 metres in length and the shortest being 1,331 feet or 406 metres), it could handle 2,500 wagons a day. These were brought in by 50 down and 26 up trains, and being removed by 18 down and 46 up services. This was, probably, the busiest marshalling yard in the country at that time. Up to 3,390 wagons could be sorted per day and an incoming train of wagons could be sorted in 12 minutes.

The yard fulfilled an important part in the rail network for over four decades, especially during World War II, passing in to Southern Railway ownership in 1923 and British Railways in 1948. However, with the reduction of freight traffic carried by rail in the 1960s, the yard became redundant and closed on 6 January 1969. Part of the yard is occupied by the Royal Mail's Jubilee Mail Centre, which handles work for the TW, KT, GU postcode areas as well as parts of South and West London.

== Heathrow Airtrack ==
In the late 2000s, the site was proposed to be used as a train depot for the Heathrow Airtrack project, given its location close to Staines. Following the financial crisis, Airtrack was cancelled by the British Airport Authority in 2011 due to lack of funds for the project.

== SWR Feltham depot ==
In 2018, South Western Railway proposed to build a new depot on the site of the old marshalling yard. Despite not being used for railway purposes since the late 1960s, the site had remained in railway ownership. In June 2020 the new £60 million depot started construction, and was completed in late 2020. The depot will stable ten 10-car Class 701 EMUs serving the Waterloo–Reading line, as well as providing facilities for traincrews.

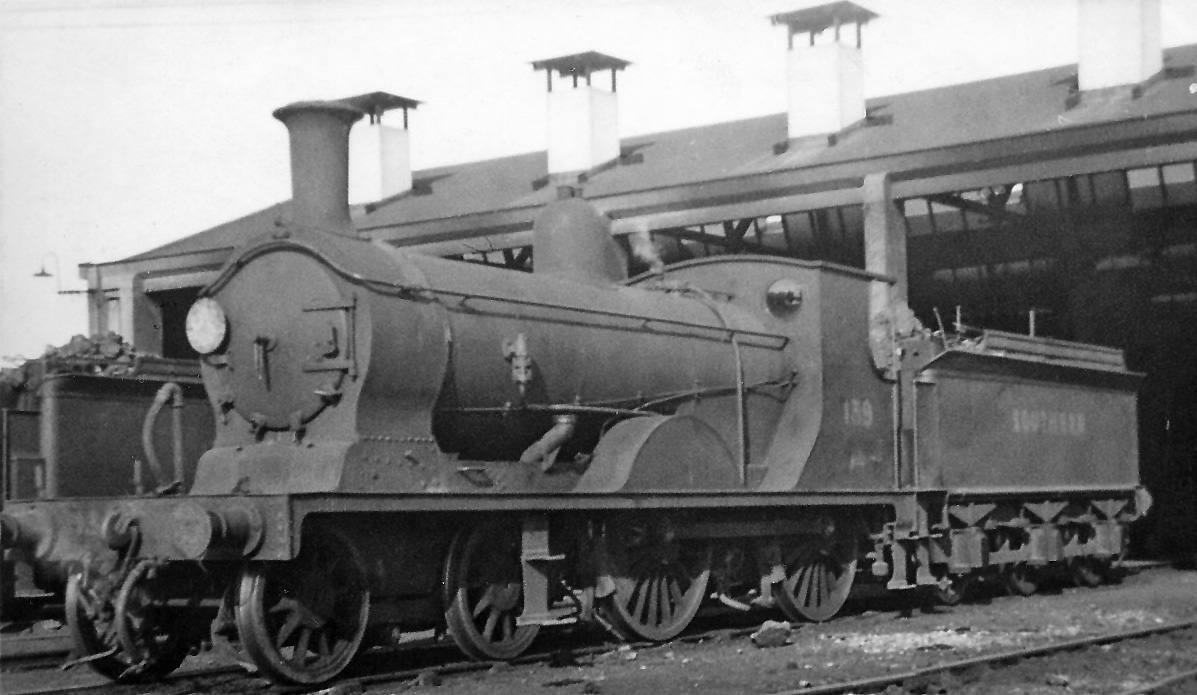
Drummond class K10 4-4-0, 'mixed-traffic' locomotive at Feltham 1947

== Motive power depot ==
Plans were made for a new automated locomotive servicing depot at the marshalling yard, to replace an existing depot at Strawberry Hill (which was converted into an electric multiple unit servicing depot). The shed was 475 by 125 feet (145 m × 38 m) with six roads and could accommodate 42 locomotives. There were inspection pits throughout and a 50-ton engine-hoist. There was also an electrically driven 65-foot (20 m) turntable and an electrically operated coaling plant.

In 1921, Robert Urie, the Chief Mechanical Engineer of the LSWR introduced four large 4-8-0 shunting tank locomotives of the G16 class specifically to operate the yard, and five similar H16 class of 4-6-2T to undertake the transfer freight workings from Feltham. In addition the depot had a large allocation of H15 and S15 4-6-0 locomotives for heavy freight duties. The G16 and H16 locomotives were all withdrawn between 1959 and 1962, and the depot was closed by British Railways in 1967.
