= LSWR G16 class =

Class of 4 two-cylinder locomotives

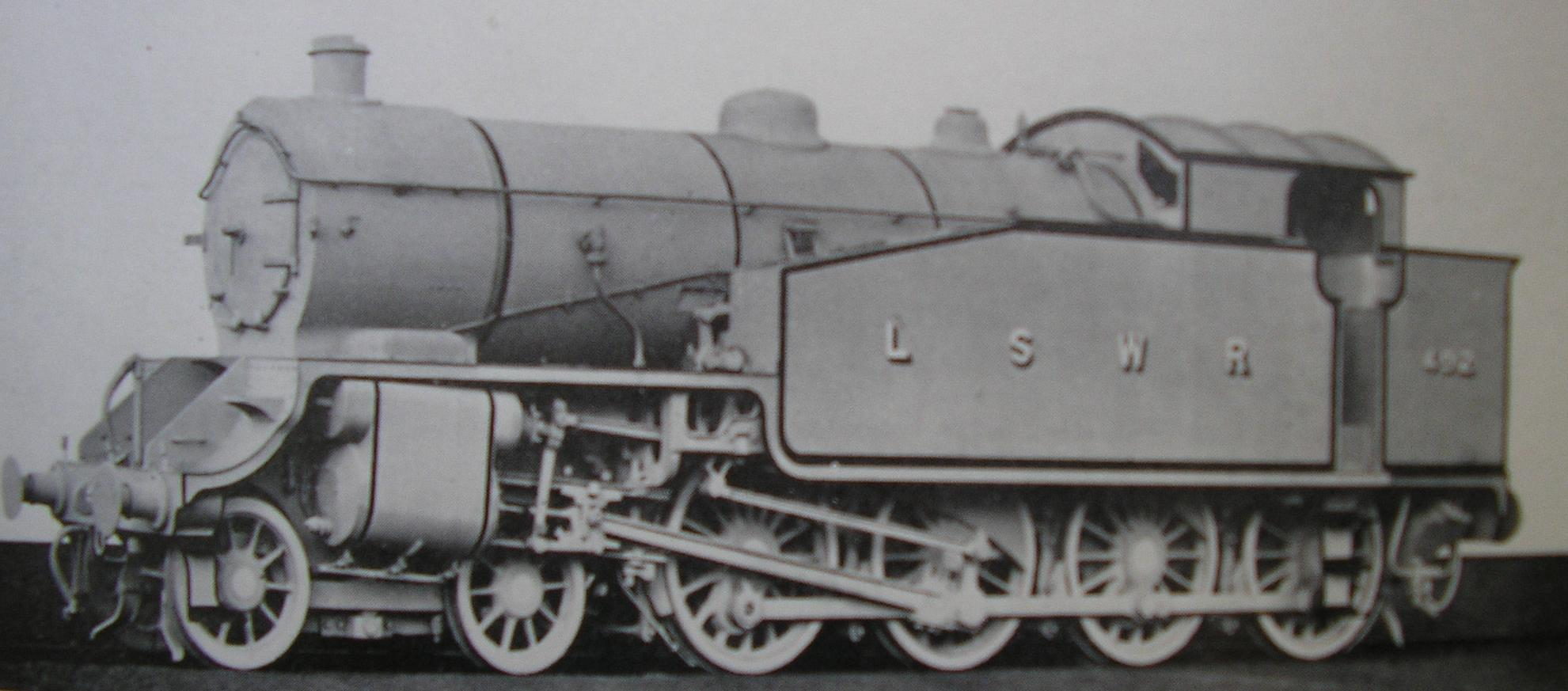
- Works photograph of LSWR G16 prototype No. 492 at Eastleigh, 1921. The locomotive is in photographic grey livery
Type and origin
- Power type: Steam
- Designer: Robert Urie
- Builder: LSWR Eastleigh Works
- Build date: 1921
- Total produced: 4
Specifications
- Configuration
  - Whyte: 4-8-0T
  - UIC: 2′D h2tG
- Gauge: 4 ft 8 1/2 in (1,435 mm)
- Leading dia.: 3 ft 7 in (1.092 m)
- Driver dia.: 5 ft 1 in (1.549 m)
- Length: 42 ft 10 1/4 in (13.06 m)
- Width: 9 ft 2 in (2.79 m)
- Height: 13 ft 1 3/8 in (4.00 m)
- Axle load: 18.50 long tons (18.8 t)
- Adhesive weight: 72.90 long tons (74.1 t)
- Loco weight: 95.10 long tons (96.6 t)
- Fuel type: Coal
- Fuel capacity: 3.50 long tons (3.6 t)
- Water cap.: 2,000 imp gal (9,100 L; 2,400 US gal)
- Firebox
  - Grate area: 27 sq ft (2.5 m^{2})
- Boiler pressure: 180 psi (1.24 MPa)
- Heating surface
  - Firebox: 139 sq ft (12.9 m^{2})
  - Tubes and flues: 1,267 sq ft (117.7 m^{2})
- Superheater
  - Type: Eastleigh (later Maunsell)
  - Heating area: 231 sq ft (21.5 m^{2})
- Cylinders: Two, outside
- Cylinder size: 22 in × 28 in (559 mm × 711 mm)
- Valve gear: Walschaerts
Performance figures
- Tractive effort: 33,991 lbf (151.20 kN)
- Factor of adh.: 4.4 (with tanks and bunkers half full)
Career
- Operators: London and South Western Railway; → Southern Railway; → British Railways
- Class: LSWR / SR: G16
- Power class: SR: A; BR: 7F, later 8F
- Numbers: LSWR: 492–495; SR: E492–E495 → 492–495; BR: 30492–30495
- Nicknames: Black Tanks
- Withdrawn: 1959–1962
- Disposition: All scrapped

The LSWR G16 class was a class of steam tank locomotives with a 4-8-0T wheel arrangement. It was designed by Robert Urie and introduced in 1921 specifically for heavy shunting over humps at Feltham marshalling yard, on the London and South Western Railway (LSWR). They were based upon Urie's previous S15 class freight design, and apart from several periods of operating elsewhere on the LSWR and Southern railway network, they remained at Feltham for most of their operational careers.

== Background ==
With the fast growth of the LSWR's London area goods traffic in the early years of the twentieth century, the company decided to construct a modern gravitational or 'hump' marshalling yard at Feltham. This location gave excellent access to the company main lines as well as direct links to the Great Western Railway and London and North Western Railway, and to the Midland Railway, Great Northern Railway and Great Eastern Railway via the North London Line. Although completion of Feltham yard was delayed by the First World War, it was completed soon after. A new design of locomotive was required to haul heavy freight trains over the various flyovers that large marshalling yards such as Feltham had.

== Design features ==
Urie had designed four very large shunting tanks based on his S15 goods 4-6-0s, except for utilising a somewhat smaller boiler, and eight-coupled wheels of 5 feet 1 inch (1.549 m) diameter for extra traction. Urie's design resulted in massive locomotives that weighed in at 95 tons, and were the most powerful locomotives on the LSWR system. When passed over to Southern Railway ownership, the new Chief Mechanical Engineer Richard Maunsell gave consideration to constructing more G16 locomotives, but instead decided to develop his SR Z Class 0-8-0T. Originally it had been intended to use them for transfer and trip workings so superheating was provided. Originally these were the Eastleigh design of superheater, but in later years these were replaced by the Maunsell pattern. This turned out to be a hindrance to the shunting activities and most of the transfer and trip workings were assigned to the similar H16 class of 4-6-2 tanks. The G16 and H16 classes shared many components of the same design, such as boilers and fireboxes. The G16s, along with the T14s and H16s, were the widest standard gauge steam locomotives ever to run in Britain.

Harold Holcroft had a number of criticisms of the design as a shunting loco: too much adhesive weight was lost to the front bogie, the large grate consumed too much coal when standing idle, and the use of superheating was pointless for a shunting loco. Additionally, the locos had been designed for a minimum curve radius of 7 chains (140 m). After some derailments to the rear drivers on some parts of the yard, it was found that parts of the yard had been laid out with tighter curves than promised.

== Construction history ==
Year	Order	Quantity	LSWR numbers	Notes
1921	G16	4	492–495	

== Operational details ==
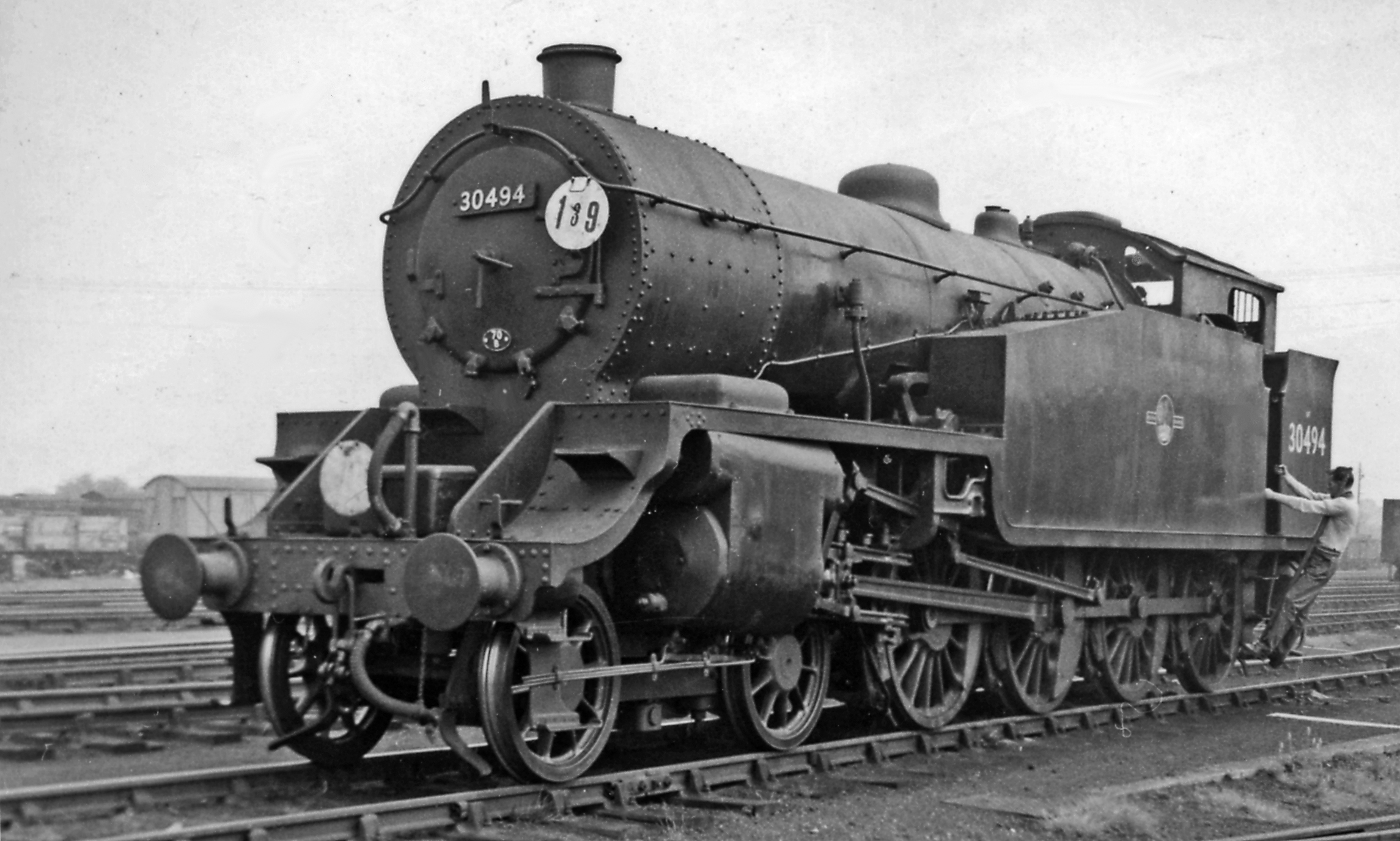
30494 at Feltham 11 May 1959.

Although they were trialled on other duties around the system, most of their life was spent allocated to the new shed at Feltham. The lack of maintenance for most locomotives during World War II meant that such massive and reliable machines as the G16s continued operating even in very run-down condition. The introduction of 0-6-0 diesel electric shunters at Feltham in the 1950s made the G16s redundant. They were used occasionally on empty stock and van trains from various depots such as Guildford, but these duties were limited in numbers and further electrification in the Southern Region meant that there was a surplus of locomotives in the late 1950s. One G16 was withdrawn in 1959, another in 1960 and the final two in December 1962. None have been preserved.
