= SR Z class =

Class of 8 three-cylinder locomotives

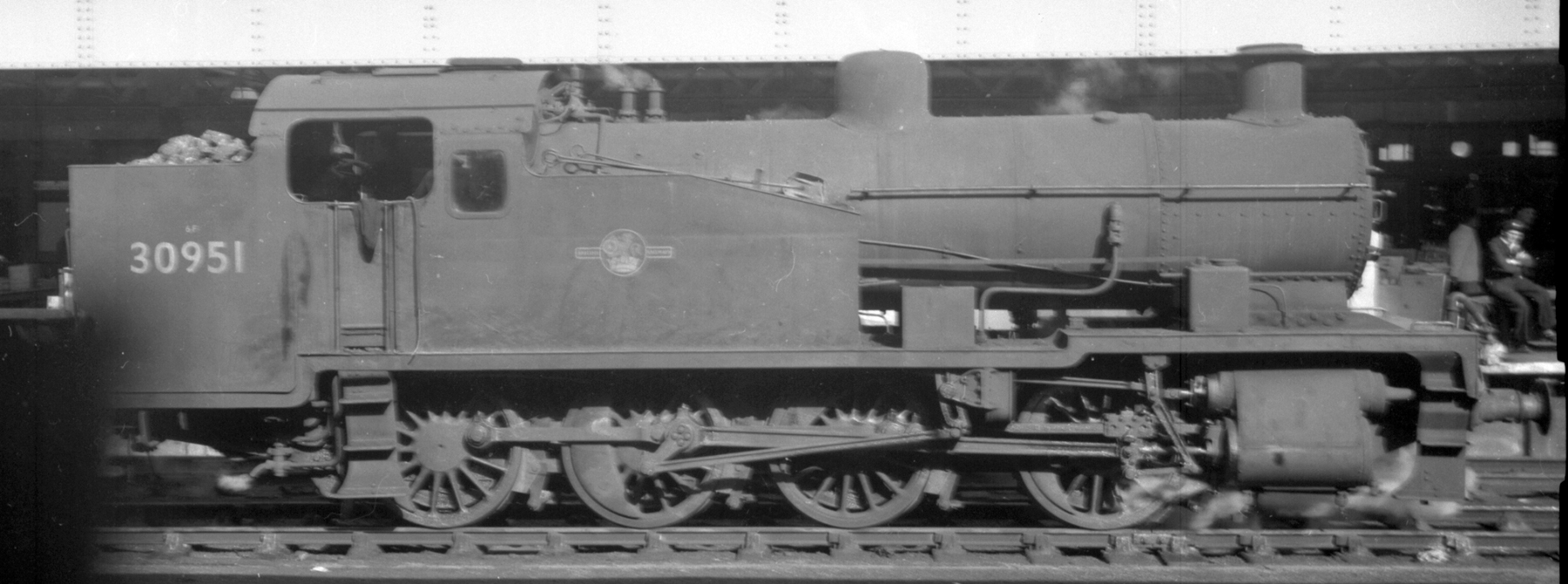
- BR Z class 30951 at Exeter Central, 1960
Type and origin
- Power type: Steam
- Designer: Richard Maunsell
- Builder: SR Brighton Works
- Build date: 1929
- Total produced: 8
Specifications
- Configuration
  - Whyte: 0-8-0T
  - UIC: D n3tG
- Gauge: 4 ft 8 1/2 in (1,435 mm) standard gauge
- Driver dia.: 4 ft 8 in (1.422 m)
- Length: 39 ft 4 in (11.99 m)
- Loco weight: 71 long tons 12 cwt (160,400 lb or 72.7 t); 72.7 t; 80.2 short tons
- Fuel type: Coal
- Fuel capacity: 3 long tons 0 cwt (6,700 lb or 3 t); 3.0 t; 3.4 short tons
- Water cap.: 1,500 imp gal (6,800 L; 1,800 US gal)
- Firebox
  - Grate area: 18.6 square feet (1.73 m^{2})
- Boiler pressure: 180 psi (1.24 MPa)
- Cylinders: 3
- Cylinder size: 16 in × 28 in (406 mm × 711 mm)
Performance figures
- Tractive effort: 29,376 lbf (130.67 kN)
Career
- Operators: Southern Railway; → British Railways
- Class: SR: Z
- Power class: BR: 7F, later 6F
- Numbers: SR: 950–957; BR: 30950–30957
- Withdrawn: 1962
- Disposition: All scrapped

The SR Z class was an 0-8-0T 3-cylinder tank engine designed by Richard Maunsell and intended for heavy shunting on the Southern Railway, the first eight entering into service in 1929. It was a successful design and would have been built in greater numbers, but an order for a further ten was cancelled in 1930 due to the reduction in freight traffic as a result of the Great Depression.

== Background ==
The newly amalgamated Southern Railway needed a group of powerful shunting tank locomotives to work in its marshalling yards around London and on freight transfers between them. Robert Urie's G16 class 4-8-0 performed this task well, and further examples were on order in 1922, but Richard Maunsell considered the firebox to be too large and the superheater an unnecessary expense on such locomotives. He therefore cancelled the order in favour of a new design.

Due to the requirement for heavy shunting, the design was provided with an 0-8-0 wheel arrangement to increase traction, whilst enabling the locomotives to negotiate tight curves prevalent in goods yards. Another requirement was for the locomotive to be able to maintain power after long periods of standing idle, as freight marshalling was an intermittent duty. A 1,500-imperial-gallon (6,800 L; 1,800 US gal) water capacity was also required to reduce the need for regular watering.

== Construction history ==
The new class was largely designed at Ashford railway works but, as a result of the unexpected need to redesign and rebuild the SECR K class locomotives at Ashford, Maunsell decided to construct the Z class at Brighton. One result of this change was that the boiler used was of an existing Brighton design, that of the D.E. Marsh C3 class. The resultant design was a three-cylinder locomotive that incorporated Walschaerts outside valve gear, controlling the outside cylinders, and custom-built inside gear controlling the central cylinder. The first of the class emerged from Brighton in March 1929 followed by the remainder over the next six months.

Steam and vacuum brakes, as well as steam heating were provided. This was to enable the locomotive to undertake the shunting of passenger stock should such a role be called for. A second batch of ten locomotives was planned to be constructed at Eastleigh, but the economic climate in 1931 meant that the order was scrapped. By the time trade recovered in the mid 1930s, Maunsell had begun experimenting in the use of diesel-electric shunting locomotives for these duties, and no further examples were built.

== Operational details ==
Throughout their working lives, the Z class locomotives remained in their role as heavy shunters in the larger marshalling yards at Feltham, Hither Green, Norwood Junction, Exmouth Junction and Eastleigh, and proved to be very popular with the locomotive crews until they were replaced by diesel shunters of the D3/13 class (later Class 12) in the early 1950s. They were less successful at Nine Elms yard as the buffer beams overhung the ends of the locomotives by 11 ft (3.35 m) in total, which could be a disadvantage when negotiating tight curves in a confined space during shunting.

In December 1942 three of the class (numbers 951, 955, and 956) were loaned to the War Department and saw service in Scotland, where their abilities to move heavy freight were needed to move troop trains and war materials over winding routes. These were considered a rarity amongst locomotive crews, and due to the customised inside valve gear, the regulators worked in a different fashion to the norm, therefore causing problems amongst those unfamiliar with the design. They returned to the Southern Railway in May 1943.

As more diesel-electric shunters were delivered during the 1950s the class was gradually transferred to less demanding work at Brighton and Tonbridge freight yards. Towards the end of their working lives, the entire class was moved to the Western section of the BR Southern Region (BR(SR)), where their traction was put to good use in banking trains up the steep bank between Exeter St. David's and Exeter Central stations. However, with the reorganisation of the BR regions in 1962, the Western section of the BR(SR) came under the control of the BR Western Region (BR(WR)). As the Z class was not of a standard design under BR(WR) control, they were withdrawn throughout 1962, and banking duties were taken over by ex-GWR Pannier Tanks.

== Livery and numbering ==
=== Southern ===
Livery was black, with yellow numbering and 'Southern' on the tank sides. As the class were built at Brighton the locomotives should logically have been allocated numbers in the ‘B’ (Brighton) series but they rather entered traffic as A950–A957 reflecting their Ashford origins. However, by the time of the 1931 renumbering scheme when Ashford locomotives had 1000 added to their numbers, the numbers 1950–1957 had already been allocated. The class were therefore numbered in the western section sequence 950–957.

=== Post-1948 (nationalisation) ===
Livery remained black in the guise of BR Freight Black, and the locomotives were provided with the BR crest on the tanks, whilst the numbering was located on the sides of the coal bunker. The Z class were given the numbers 30950–30957 under the BR standard numbering system. The BR power classification was initially 7F, but this was revised to 6F in October 1953.

== Preservation attempt ==
A private attempt was made in the 1960s to preserve a Z class, BR no 30952 with the intention to locate it on the Bluebell Railway in Sussex. The locomotive was withdrawn from service in November 1962 and stored in working order at Exmouth Junction locomotive shed until the Spring of 1963. It was then moved to Fratton MPD where it was stored for the remainder of 1963 and most of 1964. Eventually the preservation attempt failed, and the locomotive was on the scrap line at Eastleigh Works, with coupling rods removed and tied to one side, by October 1964. It was at Bristol (Barrow Road) MPD for a short period early in 1965 while on its way to South Wales for scrapping. It was cut up at Cashmores of Newport in May 1965.

== Locomotive Summary ==
Z class locomotive fleet summary
SR No.	BR No.	Date Built	Date Withdrawn
950	30950	March 1929	October 1962
951	30951	April 1929	November 1962
952	30952	May 1929	November 1962
953	30953	May 1929	December 1962
954	30954	June 1929	December 1962
955	30955	July 1929	December 1962
956	30956	August 1929	December 1962
957	30957	September 1929	November 1962

== Notes ==
=== Bibliography ===
- Bradley, D.L. (1975). Locomotives of the Southern Railway Part 1. London: Railway Correspondence and Travel Society. ISBN 0-901115-30-4.
- Fereday, Glenn, D. (1997). Rail Rover From Kent to Cornwall. Stroud: Alan Sutton Publishing. ISBN 0-86299-530-2.
- Haresnape, Brian (1977). Maunsell Locomotives - a pictorial history. Stroud: Ian Allan Ltd. ISBN 0-7110-0743-8.
