= LMS diesel shunters =

London, Midland and Scottish Railway locomotives

The London, Midland and Scottish Railway (LMS) pioneered the use of diesel shunting locomotives in Great Britain. The variety of experimental and production diesel shunters produced by the LMS is summarised below.

== 5519 renumbered ZM9 ==
This was an 0-4-0 diesel mechanical shunting locomotive built by Hudswell Clarke for the Crewe Works Narrow-gauge railway in 1930. It was the first diesel locomotive supplied to a major UK railway. It had a McLaren-Benz 2-cylinder engine of 20 hp (15 kW) at 800 rpm. It was transferred to Horwich Works in 1935. It was renumbered ZM9 by British Railways and survived until 1957.

== 1831 ==
This was the first experimental, standard-gauge shunter, nominally rebuilt from a Midland Railway steam locomotive in 1932 (originally built in September 1892 by the Vulcan Foundry). The rebuild therefore inherited the same number (1831), although little of the steam locomotive was actually re-used. 1831 was not successful, but it did provide useful data for the further development of the diesel shunter design. It was withdrawn from service in September 1939 and converted to a mobile power unit, emerging in its new guise as MPU3 in November 1940. It was scrapped in the 1950s (sources vary as to exactly when).

== 7400–7408 later renumbered 7050–7058 ==
A further nine prototype locomotives were built 1932-1935 by a variety of manufacturers. These were allocated the number series 7400–7408, but the LMSR soon realised that this number range was too limited for the number of production diesel shunters that were anticipated, and a new number series commencing with number 7050 was used. Only 7050–7053/7058 carried their original numbers (7400–7403/7408), and they were all renumbered in November/December 1934, some before they had actually entered service. For detailed information see the main articles:

- LMS diesel shunter 7050
- LMS diesel shunter 7051
- LMS diesel shunter 7052
- LMS diesel shunter 7054
- LMS diesel shunters 7055/6
- LMS diesel shunter 7057
- LMS diesel shunter 7058

== 7059–7068 ==
These were 0-6-0 diesel-electric shunters built by Armstrong Whitworth in 1936.

== 7069–7129 later renumbered 12000–12042 ==
Details of the four classes allocated numbers in this range are included on other pages, as follows:

- 7069–7078 / 12000–12001 : British Rail Class D3/6, twin motor
- 7079 / 12002 : British Rail Class D3/6, twin motor
- 7080–7119 / 12003–12032 : British Rail Class D3/7, single motor, jackshaft drive
- 7120–7129 / 12033–12042 : British Rail Class D3/8 (Later TOPS Class 11), twin motor

NB: Production of the last-mentioned class continued after Nationalisation, with the following two locomotives emerging as M7130 and M7131 (later 12043/12044) and the remainder carrying BR numbers 12045–12138 from new. Although allocated TOPS Class 11, none of these locomotives were renumbered. When 12082 was re-registered for use on the mainline, it was allocated TOPS number 01553 in the ex-industrial registered shunters list.

== Departmental 2 later renumbered ED1 ==
This locomotive was very similar to the Great Western Railway's diesel locomotive number 1.

== Trial locomotives ==
The LMS used a number of locomotives on loan from their manufacturers for trials. These locomotives were not allocated LMS numbers, and details of their use and disposal are sketchy. Such locomotives included:

- Vulcan – a diesel-mechanical 0-6-0 shunter built at the Vulcan Foundry, Newton-le-Willows, in 1936. It had a Vulcan-Frichs 6-cylinder 275 hp (205 kW) diesel engine. After loan to the LMS, it was used by the War Department, which numbered it 75 (later 70075). Following the end of World War II, it found industrial use in Yugoslavia.
- (Unnumbered) – an Armstrong-Whitworth/Sulzer shunter built in 1932, which was an earlier version of the LMS's own 7408/7058. This locomotive was also loaned to the London and North Eastern Railway for trials.

== See also ==
- GWR diesel shunters
- LNER internal combustion locomotives
- Southern Railway diesels
