= British Rail Class D3/7 =

Class of 40 350hp diesel-electric switchers

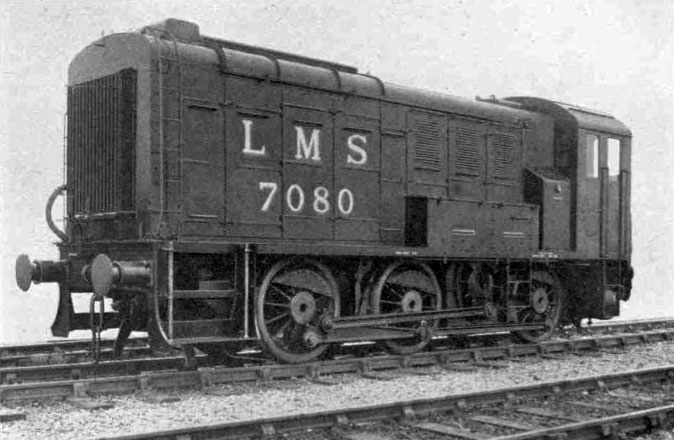
- LMS No. 7080
Type and origin
- Power type: Diesel-electric
- Builder: LMS Derby Works (mechanical); English Electric Rugby (engine); English Electric Bradford (electrical)
- Order number: LMS Lots 141 and 156
- Build date: 1939–1942
- Total produced: 40
Specifications
- Configuration
  - Whyte: 0-6-0DE
  - UIC: C
- Gauge: 4 ft 8 1/2 in (1,435 mm)
- Wheel diameter: 4 ft 3 in (1.30 m)
- Wheelbase: 15 ft 3 in (4.65 m)
- Length: 31 ft 4.5 in (9.563 m)
- Loco weight: 7080–7099: 55.25 long tons (56.14 t), 7100–7119: 53.50 long tons (54.36 t)
- Fuel capacity: 586 imp gal (2,660 L; 704 US gal) main, 75 imp gal (340 L; 90 US gal) service tank
- Prime mover: English Electric diesel 6-cylinder, 4-stroke
- Traction motors: English Electric, 1 off
Performance figures
- Maximum speed: 20 mph (32 km/h)
- Power output: Engine: 350 bhp (260 kW) @ 680 rpm
- Tractive effort: 35,000 lbf (160,000 N)
Career
- Operators: London, Midland and Scottish Railway, British Railways
- Class: LMS: 0F, BR: D3/7; later 3/8 and 3/8B
- Numbers: LMS:7080–7119; BR: 12003–12032
- Axle load class: 7080–7099: RA 7, 7110–7119: RA 6
- Withdrawn: 1964 (1), 1966–1967
- Disposition: 2 Preserved (7103 & 7106)
- Source : The Engineer, 14 July 1939, except where noted

The British Railways Class D3/7 is a class of 0-6-0 diesel electric shunting locomotives built as LMS Nos. 7080–7119. The class were built from May 1939 through to July 1942 by the London, Midland and Scottish Railway at their Derby Works using a diesel electric transmission supplied by English Electric.

They are a modified version of the 1934-vintage Class D3/6 (LMS 7069-7079) diesel shunters based on the English Electric 6K diesel engine of 350 horsepower (260 kW), but have jackshaft transmission necessitating a significant increase in body length. The D3/6 had two axle-hung traction motors instead, and this feature became commonplace in more modern designs built after World War II.

== Design ==
The locomotives are built to the specifications of LMS CME W.A. Stanier for general and hump shunting at the company's Derby Works using engine and electric equipment supplied by the English Electric Company.

=== Powertrain ===
The engine and generator are supported on girders attached to the main frame via a three-point suspension with rubber vibration absorbing pads; the generator is to the rear of the engine. The locomotive body is compartmentalised, with side doors and a sliding roof allowing access. Cooling is by a front-mounted radiator, with belt-driven fan cooling.

The main generator is a 250 kW (340 hp) direct current machine. Main control was via notched engine speed control (350, 465, 590, and 680 rpm), with finer control via secondary lever. The engine is fitted with a governor preventing overspeed, and electric overload protection.

The locomotive's mechanical transmission consists of a single, frame-mounted traction motor powering a jackshaft drive via a reduction gear; the jackshaft drives all three driving axles via connecting rod and coupling rods. The locomotive is unusual in that most other English Electric diesel shunters (e.g. British Rail Class D3/6) have two axle-hung traction motors.

The locomotive has an inner main frame similar to steam engine practice, with the axles supported by springs attached to the frame by tensioned rods, the centre axle had 0.5 in (13 mm) side play. The jackshaft is mounted in horn guides with the reduction gear totally enclosed on the left side of the locomotive.

=== Auxiliaries ===
An 80-volt battery is used to energise the main generator, as well as powering the electric control system and lights, and is also used to start the engine with the generator in motor mode. The battery is automatically charged when the engine is idling. An air compressor is powered via a belt drive from the generator. Compressed air operates the Westinghouse double-wheel tread brakes, as well as the sanding equipment and the whistle.

== History and numbering ==
Initially 20 of the type were ordered on Lot 141 with a number of the new design put into operation at Toton Sidings by mid 1939. An order for a further 20 units was placed on Lot 156 in 1939. These forty locomotives were given LMS numbers 7080–7119.

Ten (7100–7109) were loaned to the War Department in 1941, and sold to the WD the following year. All ten survived the war; six were then sold to Egyptian Railways and four to Italian State Railways (Ferrovie dello Stato—FS) where they were matriculated as Class Ne.700.

The other 30 stayed remained in Britain and later became British Railways numbers 12003–12032. One, 12030 was withdrawn in 1964, with the remainder withdrawn during 1966/67, before TOPS classes were allocated.

== Preservation ==
Although none of the Egyptian locomotives survive, one British-Italian example - 700.001 (formerly LMS No. 7103) is preserved. 700.001 was sold to industry in 1984 and preserved later on, and is on display at the Museo Ferroviario Piemontese. Another locomotive, 700.003 (ex LMS No.7106), is still in active service with Trasporto Ferroviario Toscano and regularly operates within the Arezzo province.

== See also ==
- LMS diesel shunters
