= LMS diesel shunter 7051 =

LMS 7051
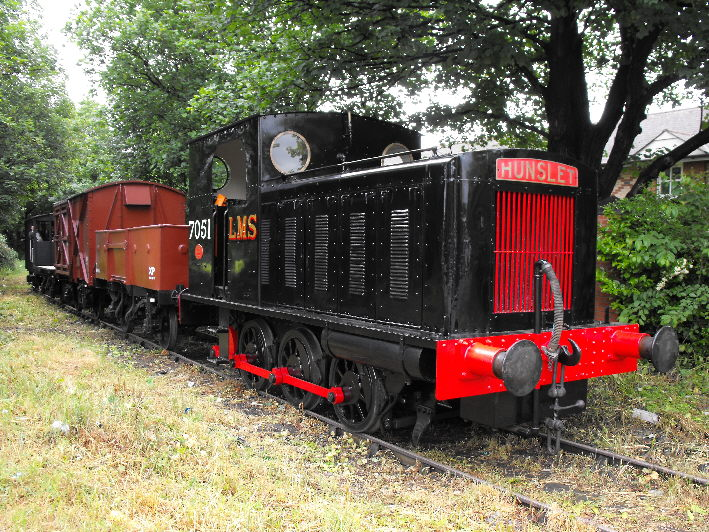
- 7051 "John Alcock" at the Middleton Railway
Type and origin
- Power type: Diesel-mechanical
- Builder: Hunslet Engine Company
- Serial number: 1697
- Build date: February 1932
- Total produced: 1
Specifications
- Configuration
  - Whyte: 0-6-0DM
  - UIC: C
- Gauge: 4 ft 8 1/2 in (1,435 mm)
- Wheel diameter: 3 ft 0 in (0.914 m)
- Wheelbase: 8 ft 0 in (2.44 m)
- Length: 23 ft 2 in (7.06 m)
- Width: 8 ft 2 in (2.49 m)
- Height: 11 ft 4 3/4 in (3.47 m)
- Loco weight: 21 long tons 8 cwt (47,900 lb or 21.7 t)
- Fuel capacity: 100 imperial gallons (450 L; 120 US gal)
- Prime mover: MAN WV16/22 6-cyl of 150 hp (112 kW) at 900 rpm; later McLaren Ricardo MR6 of 132 hp (98 kW)
- Transmission: Hunslet clutch and 4-speed pre-selector gearbox
- Loco brake: Air
- Train brakes: None (Vacuum brake fitted in preservation)
Performance figures
- Maximum speed: 30 mph (48 km/h)
- Tractive effort: 10,520 lbf (46.8 kN)
Career
- Operators: London, Midland and Scottish Railway; War Department; Hunslet Engine Company
- Numbers: LMS 7401; LMS 7051; WD 27; WD 70027
- Withdrawn: December 1945
- Disposition: Preserved

LMS diesel shunter 7051 was built by the Hunslet Engine Company to demonstrate its wares.

== History ==
After public exhibition in February 1932 it was trialled at a colliery before being tested by the LMS, and after further exhibition in February 1933, it was purchased by them in May of that year.

It was loaned to the War Department from August 1940, which numbered it 27. From 1941 to 1944 it was returned to the LMS but sent back again in August 1944, now numbered 70027.

The LMS took it back once more after the war, but was withdrawn in December 1945 and resold back to Hunslet. Hunslet used the locomotive as a works shunter, but it was also available for hire and occasionally loaned to oil refineries in Essex and British Railways.

In September 1960, the locomotive was preserved by the Middleton Railway in Leeds and named John Alcock, named after the then current Managing Director of Hunslet Railway Company. It remains at the Middleton Railway, but has spent time on loan to other locations, including the National Railway Museum in York.

== See also ==
- LMS diesel shunters

== Literature ==
- Rowledge, J.W.P. (1975). Engines of the LMS built 1923–51. Oxford: Oxford Publishing Company. pp. 36, 42, 72, 84. ISBN 0-902888-59-5.
- Strickland, David C. (September 1983). Locomotive Directory: Every Single One There Has Ever Been. Camberley: Diesel and Electric Group. pp. 23–25. ISBN 978-0-906375-10-5. OCLC 16601890. OL 27959920M. Wikidata Q105978499.
- Tourret, R. (1995). Allied Military Locomotives of the Second World War. Abingdon, Oxon: Tourret Publishing. pp. 36–42. ISBN 0-905878-06-X.
