= British Rail Class D3/10 =

Diesel-electric shunter locomotive

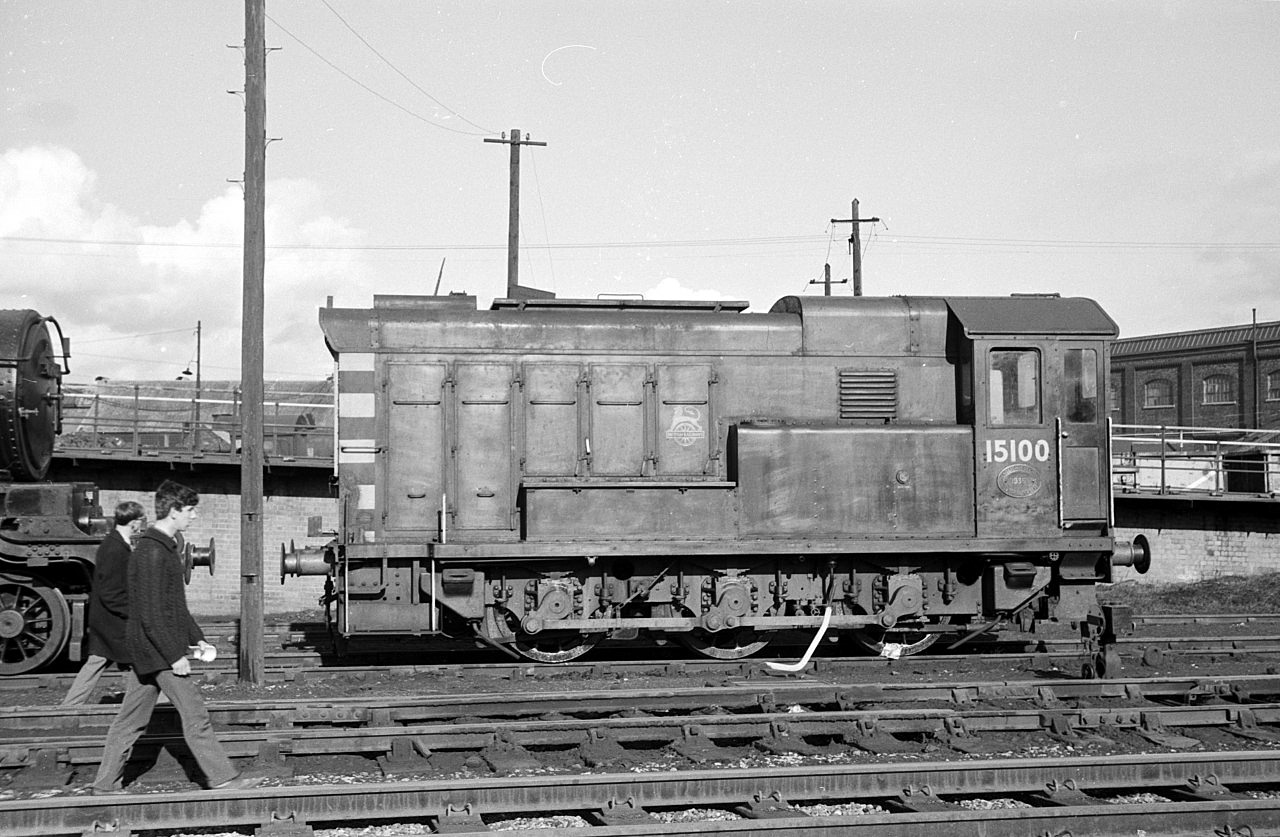
- No. 15100 at Swindon in 1963.
Type and origin
- Power type: Diesel-electric
- Builder: Hawthorn Leslie
- Serial number: HL: 3853/35
- Build date: 1935
- Total produced: 1
Specifications
- Configuration
  - Whyte: 0-6-0DE
  - UIC: C
- Gauge: 4 ft 8 1/2 in (1,435 mm) standard gauge
- Wheel diameter: 4 ft 0 1/2 in (1.232 m)
- Wheelbase: 11 ft 6 in (3.505 m)
- Loco weight: 51.55 long tons (52.38 t; 57.74 short tons)
- Fuel capacity: 500 imp gal (2,300 L; 600 US gal)
- Prime mover: English Electric 6K
- Traction motors: English Electric, 2 off
- MU working: Not fitted
- Train heating: None
Performance figures
- Maximum speed: 19 mph (31 km/h)
- Power output: Engine: 350 bhp (261 kW)
- Tractive effort: 30,240 lbf (134.5 kN)
Career
- Operators: Great Western Railway, British Railways
- Class: BR: D3/10; later 3/11A
- Numbers: GWR: 2; BR: 15100
- Axle load class: Route availability 5
- Retired: April 1965
- Disposition: Scrapped

British Rail Class D3/10 was a single experimental diesel-electric shunter locomotive commissioned by the Great Western Railway (GWR), and later taken over by British Railways.

== Building ==
The locomotive was built for the GWR by Hawthorn Leslie of Newcastle upon Tyne, during 1935/6. It was equipped with an English Electric 6K diesel engine and two English Electric traction motors. It was delivered to Swindon Works in April 1936 as GWR No. 2.

The GWR initiated a partial renumbering scheme in 1946, which took some years to complete since it was mainly carried out as and when locomotives were overhauled. In this plan, no. 2 was to become no. 500. However, under British Railways ownership, it was instead renumbered 15100 in March 1948, and classified D3/10 (later 3/11A).

== Allocations ==
After testing, the locomotive was allocated to Old Oak Common in October 1936 and used for shunting at Acton Yard. At the outbreak of the Second World War in September 1939, it was moved to Swansea East Dock and for a few years was loaned to the War Department at Swansea. From December 1944, it worked from Danygraig Shed in Swansea, returning to Old Oak Common in November 1947.

Under British Railways, it was moved to Bristol's St. Philips Marsh in November 1948. In early 1950, it was sent to Derby Works for repair and returned to Old Oak Common in May 1950, and Danygraig in December. In April 1951, it returned to St. Philips Marsh and returned to Swindon in January 1960, where it remained until its withdrawal in April 1965. It was sold for scrap to Cohen Brothers of Kettering in November 1965.

== See also ==
- GWR diesel shunters
- List of British Rail classes

== Sources ==
- Ian Allan ABC of British Railways Locomotives, Winter 1962–3
- The Allocation History of BR Diesel Shunters, 2018.
