= LMS diesel shunter 7058 =

British diesel locomotive

LMS 7058
Type and origin
- Power type: Diesel-electric
- Builder: Armstrong Whitworth
- Build date: February 1934
- Total produced: 1
Specifications
- Configuration
  - Whyte: 0-6-0DE
  - UIC: C
- Gauge: 4 ft 8 1/2 in (1,435 mm)
- Wheel diameter: 3 ft 6 in (1.067 m)
- Wheelbase: 13 ft 0 in (3.96 m)
- Length: 28 ft 10 in (8.79 m)
- Width: 8 ft 6 1/2 in (2.60 m)
- Height: 12 ft 5 3/4 in (3.80 m)
- Loco weight: 40.5 long tons (41.1 t)
- Fuel capacity: 570 imp gal (2,600 L; 680 US gal)
- Prime mover: Armstrong-Sulzer 6LV22 6-cyl
- Transmission: Laurence Scott & Electromotors
- Train heating: None
- Loco brake: Air
- Train brakes: None
Performance figures
- Maximum speed: 30 mph (48 km/h)
- Power output: 250 hp (186 kW) at 775 rpm
- Tractive effort: Max: 24,000 lbf (106.8 kN)
Career
- Operators: London, Midland and Scottish Railway; War Department; British Railways
- Numbers: LMS: 7058; WD: none; BR: 13000 (not carried)
- Withdrawn: November 1949
- Disposition: Scrapped

LMS diesel shunter 7058 was based on an earlier Armstrong Whitworth prototype of 1932, which had been tested by the London, Midland and Scottish Railway. It was initially numbered 7408 and then re-numbered 7058.

== War Department use ==
It was loaned to the War Department between 1941 and 1943 for use at the Longmoor Military Railway, but, despite the extensive period of time spent on loan, no WD number was allocated.

== Post-war use ==
It passed to British Railways upon nationalisation in January 1948, which allocated it number 13000. However, it was withdrawn in November 1949 (and scrapped shortly afterwards) before the number had been applied. The number 13000 was then used instead for the first of the Class 08 shunters.

== See also ==
- LMS diesel shunters
