= LNER internal combustion locomotives =

The London and North Eastern Railway used a few petrol and diesel locomotives. These included the LNER Class Y11 petrol locomotives, the diesel shunters which later became British Rail Class D3/9 and British Rail Class D3/14 and the Kitson-Still steam diesel hybrid locomotive. During the 1930s, Armstrong Whitworth supplied an experimental 1-Co-1 diesel-electric locomotive and several diesel-electric railcars. In the 1940s, the LNER had twenty-five 1,600 hp main-line diesel locomotives on order. These would have been similar to the British Rail Class D16/1 and British Rail Class D16/2 but the order was cancelled after nationalisation in 1948.

== Petrol railcars ==
The LNER inherited several petrol railcars from its constituent companies:

- NER petrol inspection car
- NER petrol-electric autocars (these were similar in body style to the Tyneside Electrics)
- NER petrol rail motor bus
- NER petrol autocar
- GCR petrol-electric railcar

== See also ==
- GWR diesel shunters
- LMS diesel shunters
- List of British Rail classes
- Southern Railway diesels
