= LMS diesel shunter 7054 =

LMS 7054
Type and origin
- Power type: Diesel-mechanical
- Builder: Hunslet Engine Company
- Build date: 1934
- Total produced: 1
Specifications
- Configuration
  - Whyte: 0-6-0DM
  - UIC: C
- Gauge: 4 ft 8 1/2 in (1,435 mm)
- Wheel diameter: 3 ft 4 in (1.016 m)
- Wheelbase: 9 ft 0 in (2.74 m)
- Length: 25 ft 0 3/4 in (7.64 m)
- Width: 8 ft 8 in (2.64 m)
- Height: 12 ft 5 in (3.78 m)
- Loco weight: 30.5 long tons (31.0 t)
- Fuel capacity: 100 imp gal (450 L; 120 US gal)
- Prime mover: (1) Davey Paxman 6VZS 6-cyl (2) Rolls-Royce C6NFL
- Transmission: Hunslet Engine Co.
- Train heating: None
- Loco brake: Air
- Train brakes: None
Performance figures
- Maximum speed: 13 mph (21 km/h)
- Power output: (1) 180 hp (134 kW) at 900 rpm (2) 179 hp (133 kW) at 1800 rpm
- Tractive effort: Max: 15,780 lbf (70.2 kN)
Career
- Operators: London, Midland and Scottish Railway; War Department; National Coal Board
- Numbers: LMS: 7054; WD: 26 → 225 → 70225; NCB: not known
- Withdrawn: See text
- Disposition: Scrapped

LMS diesel shunter 7054 was initially allocated the number 7404 but this number was never carried. It was supplied by the Hunslet Engine Company in 1934. Testing started in October 1934 and it was taken into LMS stock in November 1934.

== War Department use ==
The locomotive was loaned to the War Department for various periods of time during 1939–1942, which numbered it 26. It was withdrawn from LMS stock in May 1943 and sold to the War Department, which then numbered it 225 (70225 from 1944).

== Post-war use ==
In 1947, it was sold to Hunslet, where it was stored for seven years before being hired to the National Coal Board. The NCB later bought the locomotive and had it rebuilt with a Rolls-Royce C6NFL engine by Hunslet in 1960–61. It worked at a number of collieries for the NCB, but was finally withdrawn and scrapped in 1974.

== See also ==
- LMS diesel shunters
