= British Rail Class D3/6 =

Class of diesel shunter locomotives

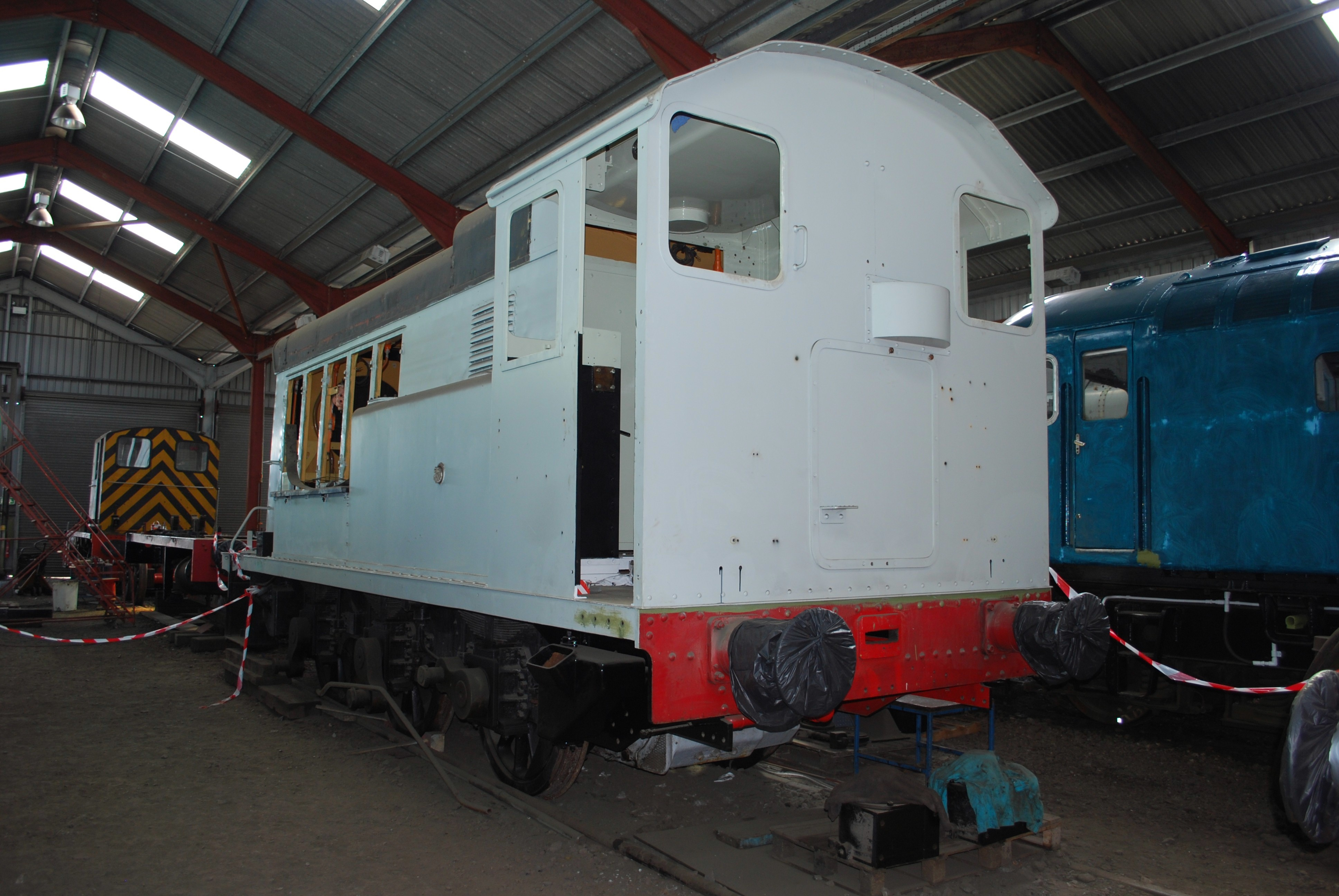
- 7069 undergoing restoration
Type and origin
- Power type: Diesel-electric
- Designer: English Electric
- Builder: Hawthorn Leslie
- Serial number: HL: 3841–3850, 3816
- Build date: 1934 (7079), 1935 (7069-78)
- Total produced: 11
Specifications
- Configuration
  - Whyte: 0-6-0 DE
  - UIC: C
- Gauge: 4 ft 8 1/2 in (1,435 mm) standard gauge
- Wheel diameter: 4 ft 0 1/2 in (1.232 m)
- Loco weight: 51.45 long tons (52.28 t; 57.62 short tons)
- Prime mover: English Electric 6K
- Traction motors: English Electric, 2 off
- MU working: Not fitted
- Train heating: None
Performance figures
- Maximum speed: 30 mph (48 km/h)
- Power output: Engine: 350 hp (261 kW)
- Tractive effort: 30,000 lbf (133.4 kN)
Career
- Operators: London, Midland and Scottish Railway, War Department, British Railways
- Class: LMS: 0F; BR: D3/6
- Numbers: LMS 7069–7079; BR 12000–12002
- Axle load class: Route availability 5
- Retired: 1940-1962
- Disposition: One preserved, remainder scrapped

The British Rail Class D3/6 were diesel shunters designed in 1934/5 by English Electric for the London, Midland and Scottish Railway. (LMS)

== Prototype ==
Between 1931 and 1934, the LMS ordered nine prototype 0-6-0 diesel shunters of different designs. The last of these was based on the English Electric 6K of 300 horsepower (220 kW) diesel engine, with a long bonnet ("nose"), 0-6-0 wheel arrangement, EE 6K prime mover and two axle-hung traction motors. It was built by Hawthorne Leslie to English Electric design. Similar prototypes were later built for the Southern Railway (SR1-3), Great Western Railway (GWR2), and London and North Eastern Railway (8000-8004) and this configuration was repeated in most subsequent large diesel shunters built in Britain, such as the British Rail Class 11 and even more numerous British Rail Class 08 that entered service after World War II.

After modification and uprating to 350 horsepower (260 kW), the prototype was taken into LMS stock in 1936 and numbered 7079, (later British Railways number 12002. It was withdrawn and scrapped in 1956.

== Production series ==
Ten further locomotives of the same design, with minor alterations and uprated to 350 horsepower (260 kW), were built in 1935 and taken into LMSR stock in 1936. These were numbered 7069-7078 by the LMS. Three of these later became British Railways numbers 12000–12002 (previously 7074/76/79 respectively). They spent their working lives allocated to Crewe South Locomotive Depot.

The remainder of the class were sold to the British War Department in 1940 and were shipped to France during World War II. Of these, the first production locomotive, No. 7069, survived the war and was used in industrial service in France. It is being restored at the Berkeley Vale Railway.

== See also ==
- LMS diesel shunters
