= LSWR S15 class =

British 2-cylinder 4-6-0 steam locomotive

LSWR/SR S15 class
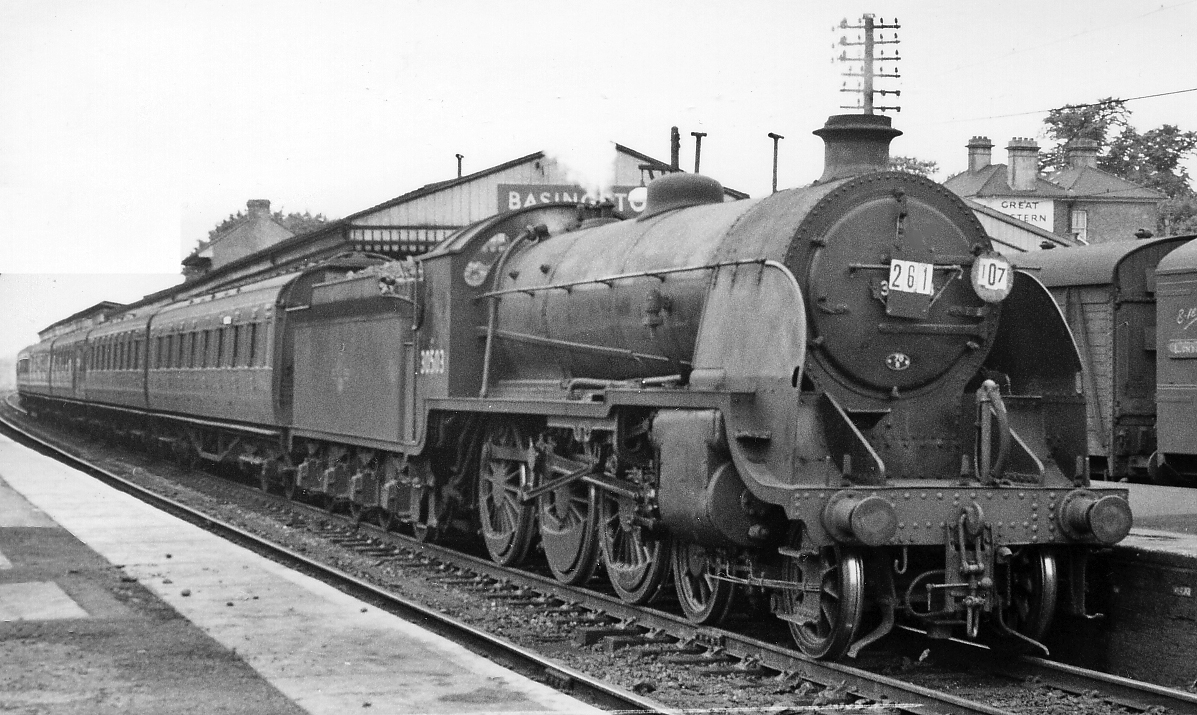
Type and origin
- Power type: Steam
- Designer: Robert Urie, modified by Richard Maunsell
- Builder: LSWR/SR Eastleigh Works
- Build date: 1920–1936
- Total produced: 45
Specifications
- Configuration
  - Whyte: 4-6-0
  - UIC: 2′C h2
- Gauge: 4 ft 8 1/2 in (1,435 mm) standard gauge
- Leading dia.: 3 ft 7 in (1.092 m)
- Driver dia.: 5 ft 7 in (1.702 m)
- Length: 65 ft 6 3/4 in (19.98 m)
- Total weight: Urie: 136 long tons 1 cwt (138.2 t; 152.4 short tons); Maunsell: 135 long tons 13 cwt (137.8 t; 151.9 short tons)
- Fuel type: Coal
- Fuel capacity: 5 long tons (5.1 t; 5.6 short tons)
- Water cap.: 5,000 imp gal (23,000 L; 6,000 US gal)
- Boiler pressure: Urie locomotives: 180 lbf/in^{2} (1.24 MPa); Saturated Boiler: 175 lbf/in^{2} (1.21 MPa); Maunsell locomotives: 200 lbf/in^{2} (1.38 MPa)
- Cylinders: Two, outside
- Cylinder size: Urie: 21 in × 28 in (533 mm × 711 mm); Maunsell: 20 1/2 in × 28 in (521 mm × 711 mm)
- Valve gear: Walschaerts
Performance figures
- Tractive effort: Urie: 28,200 lbf (125.4 kN); Maunsell: 29,860 lbf (132.8 kN)
Career
- Operators: London and South Western Railway; → Southern Railway; → British Railways
- Class: S15
- Power class: LSWR / SR: A; BR : 6F
- Numbers: LSWR: 496–515; SR: E496–E515, E823–E847 → 496–515, 823–847; BR: 30496–30515, 30823-30837 30838–30847
- Nicknames: "Goods Arthurs"
- Locale: Southern Region
- Withdrawn: 1962–1966
- Disposition: 6 preserved or extant, 1 cannibalised, remainder scrapped

The LSWR S15 class is a British 2-cylinder 4-6-0 freight steam locomotive designed by Robert W. Urie, based on his H15 class and N15 class locomotives. The class had a complex build history, spanning several years of construction from 1920 to 1936. The first examples were constructed for the London and South Western Railway (LSWR), where they hauled freight trains to the south coast ports and further west to Exeter, as well as occasional passenger work in conjunction with their larger-wheeled N15 class counterparts.

Following the Grouping of railway companies in 1923, the LSWR became part of the Southern Railway, and the Chief Mechanical Engineer (CME) of the newly formed company, Richard Maunsell, increased the S15 class strength to 45 locomotives. Maunsell incorporated several improvements, notably to the steam circuit and the locomotive's loading gauge, allowing it to operate on routes with height and width restrictions.

The new locomotives were built in three batches at Eastleigh, and were in service with the Southern Railway for 14 years. The locomotives continued in operation with the Southern Region of British Railways until 1966. Seven examples have been preserved for use on heritage railways, and are currently in varying states of repair. These locomotives were given the nickname "Goods Arthurs" due to their similar appearance to the N15 Class locomotives.

== Background ==
During the First World War, the LSWR management wished to address the requirement for a modern, standard heavy freight locomotive to work from London's freight yards to the southwest of England. As the LSWR lacked existing freight designs capable of undertaking this task, a new design was needed to serve the south coast ports of Portsmouth, Weymouth and Southampton. The design was also to power traffic including milk trains, which required fast transit to the dairies in London. Robert Urie used this opportunity to develop his recent H15 class design further, applying the 4-6-0 locomotive concept to a purpose-built freight design built to order number S15. It was this order number that gave the class the name "S15".

== Construction history ==
The S15 class were all built by Eastleigh Works in three discrete batches between February 1920 and December 1936.

Year	Order	Quantity	LSWR / SR numbers	Notes
1920	S15	5	497–501	
1920	A16	5	502–506	
1920	C16	5	507–511	
1921	E16	5	496, 512–515	
1927	E90	10	823–832	
1927	E158	5	833–837	
1936	E630	10	838–847	Final batch of 4-6-0 locomotives built by the Southern Railway.

=== First batch – Urie 1920–21 ===
This was the third design by Robert Urie for the LSWR. The outline was made during the First World War, and incorporated lessons learned from the operation of his H15 class, a design that was to provide the basis for future standardisation on the LSWR. To economise on maintenance, the S15 class had interchangeable components that could be used on a similar design, the N15 class passenger locomotive, which had the same overall appearance. Details such as the boiler, the two-cylinders and valve gear were standardised between the classes, although a taper boiler was used on the S15 and N15 classes, as opposed to the parallel boiler of the H15 class. The only other major difference was the smaller diameter of the driving wheels. Smaller diameter wheels gave better traction, essential for a fast freight locomotive.

By May 1921, sixteen were in service, and were mostly allocated to the London area, including the new marshalling yard at Feltham. Despite being mechanically sound, changes were made to Urie's original design after the Grouping of railway companies in 1923.

Urie retired as Locomotive Superintendent when the LSWR was amalgamated into the Southern Railway in 1923. Richard Maunsell was given the newly created post of CME to the Southern Railway, and decided to revise the cylinder arrangement of the locomotive. In doing so, he delayed the construction of further locomotives until the modifications had been made. When the modifications were trialled in service, it became evident amongst locomotive crews that Maunsell had taken a sound design and made it better, achieving a consistent locomotive capable of undertaking all the tasks for which it was intended. With the successful implementation of the modifications, permission was given by the management of the Southern Railway for a second batch of locomotives to be constructed.

In November 1941 during World War II, Nos. 496-499 were loaned to the Great Western Railway to assist with increased freight traffic on that railway. They were returned to the SR between March and July 1943.

=== Second batch – Maunsell 1927–28 ===
Maunsell's modifications included increasing the boiler pressure from 180 psi (1.24 MPa) to 200 psi (1.38 MPa), and the reduction of the cylinder bore by half an inch. The footplate was also modified for operation on the Southern's new composite loading gauge, and differed from previous batches in having the Ashford-style cab, which was usually fitted to LBSCR locomotives. Unlike the original Drummond cab that was also favoured by Urie, the Ashford-style cab was of an all-steel construction and had a roof that was flush with the cab sides. It was inspired by the standard cab developed in 1904 by R. M. Deeley for the Midland Railway, and was one of a number of Midland features introduced by Maunsell's chief draughtsman James Clayton, who transferred to Ashford Works in 1914 from the Midland Railway. Variants of this cab became standard for all new Southern Railway locomotives and converted tank engines.

Other modifications included the lengthening of valve travel, and fitting larger outside steam pipes to streamline the flow of steam into the cylinders. Fifteen locomotives of this revised design were built in 1927, and some were given 4,000-imperial-gallon (18,000 L; 4,800 US gal) six-wheeled tenders for use on the Southern Railway's Central section. This allowed the locomotive to be turned on the shorter turntables found on this part of the network. From new, the rest of the class was equipped with the Urie 5,000-imperial-gallon (23,000 L; 6,000 US gal) eight-wheel bogie tender, which allowed the class to operate on the extended freight routes of the Southern Railway's Western section. The standardisation measures undertaken by both Urie and Maunsell were soon vindicated by the fact that tenders and other parts were swapped with those of other classes on the Southern Railway when locomotives were under overhaul.

=== Third batch – Maunsell 1936 ===
The benefits gained by Maunsell's modifications showed in the improved performance of the first batch of Maunsell S15s over their Urie-built predecessors. A third batch was ordered in 1931, coinciding with a downturn in the volume of freight due to the Great Depression. This meant that the last of the S15 class was not completed until 1936, although weight-saving modifications were undertaken to this batch. A final modification was also applied to the class at this time, when all locomotives were equipped with smoke deflectors to improve visibility from the footplate when travelling at speed. This modification was a feature that became common to most Maunsell-influenced designs.

== Operational details ==
After modification by Maunsell, the S15 class was regarded by locomotive crews as an excellent goods engine best known for working heavy night express goods trains between Exeter, Southampton and Nine Elms. The S15s were also very capable passenger engines, being able to deputise in situations where there was a shortage of passenger locomotives during peak holiday periods. Both Urie and Maunsell S15s spent most of their working lives on the Southern Railway's Western section, although they were sometimes used on inter-regional freights. In order to increase maintenance efficiency, all Urie S15 locomotives (which had the lower boiler pressure) were concentrated at the Southern Railway's London freight depot at Feltham. This yard also featured the Maunsell S15s, which were allocated to Exmouth Junction, Hither Green and Salisbury, demonstrating the "go anywhere" nature of the class. Despite the design being only a year newer, the S15s outlasted their N15 King Arthur class counterparts because of their dual freight/passenger abilities, though they were retired between 1962 and 1966 as part of the British Railways Modernisation Plan. Maunsell S15 number 30837 became the final member of the class in operation, returning to Feltham in January 1966 to work a farewell rail tour.

Table of withdrawals
Year	Quantity in service at start of year	Quantity withdrawn	Locomotive numbers	Notes
1962	45	4	30502/04–05, 30826	
1963	41	18	30496–98, 30500–01/03/07–11/13–15, 30829/31/45–46	
1964	23	17	30499, 30506/12, 30823/25/27–28/30/32/34–36/40–41/43–44/47	30512 was the last ex-LSWR loco withdrawn. 30499, 30506, 30825, 30828, 30830, 30841 and 30847 preserved
1965	6	6	30824/33/37–39/42	

== Accidents and incidents ==
- In the summer of 1946, locomotive No. 502 was hauling a freight train that overran signals and was derailed by trap points at Wallers Ash, Hampshire.

== Preservation ==
Seven S15s have been preserved, two Urie examples and five by Maunsell, which can be seen at several heritage railways around the country. All the surviving members of the class were purchased from Woodham Brothers scrapyard in Barry, Vale of Glamorgan, South Wales. Currently only 499 and 830 have yet to steam in preservation. Of the five others that have run in preservation 825, 828 and 841 have all operated on the main line at certain points, though 825 has only run between Grosmont & Whitby.

Details of preserved engines
Number		Image	Built	Withdrawn	Service Life	Home Line	Owner	Status	Notes
SR	BR	Image	Built	Withdrawn	Service Life	Home Line	Owner	Status	Notes
499	30499		May 1920	Jan 1964	43 Years, 8 months	Mid-Hants Railway	Urie Locomotive Society.	Undergoing restoration.	Being restored to original LSWR (London & South Western Railway) design.
506	30506		Oct 1920	Jan 1964	43 Years, 3 months	Mid-Hants Railway	Urie Locomotive Society	Operational, boiler ticket expires: 2029	Returned to service 2 June 2019 after an 18-year overhaul including front frame replacement.
825	30825		Jun 1927	Jan 1964	36 Years, 9 months	North Yorkshire Moors Railway	Essex Locomotive Society	Operational, boiler ticket expires: 2029	Returned to service September 2019. Main line certified (Whitby to Grosmont and Battersby only). Running with the boiler and tender from 30841.
828	30828		Jul 1927	Jan 1964	36 Years, 6 months	Watercress Line	Eastleigh Railway Preservation Society	Undergoing overhaul.	Named Harry A Frith during its preservation career.
830	30830		Aug 1927	Jul 1964	36 Years, 11 months	North Yorkshire Moors Railway	Essex Locomotive Society	Stored awaiting restoration	Used to be based at the Bluebell Railway.
841	30841		Jul 1936	Jan 1964	27 Years, 6 months	North Yorkshire Moors Railway	Essex Locomotive Society	Cannibalised, Frames Stored	The locomotive's boiler and tender are currently in use on 825. Frames are stored in a field near Grosmont headshunt. Carried the name Greene King during its preservation career.
847	30847		Dec 1936	Jan 1964	27 Years, 1 month	Bluebell Railway	Maunsell Locomotive Society	Out of service	The locomotive appeared in the 2017 film Goodbye Christopher Robin and in the 2018 film Christopher Robin.

== Livery and numbering ==
=== LSWR and Southern Railway ===
Under LSWR ownership, the S15s were painted in the late LSWR dark Holly Green livery, with the same black and light green lining applied to most of the LSWR's freight designs. Gilt lettering and numbering was located on the tender and cabside respectively. The initials "LSWR" were located on the tender.

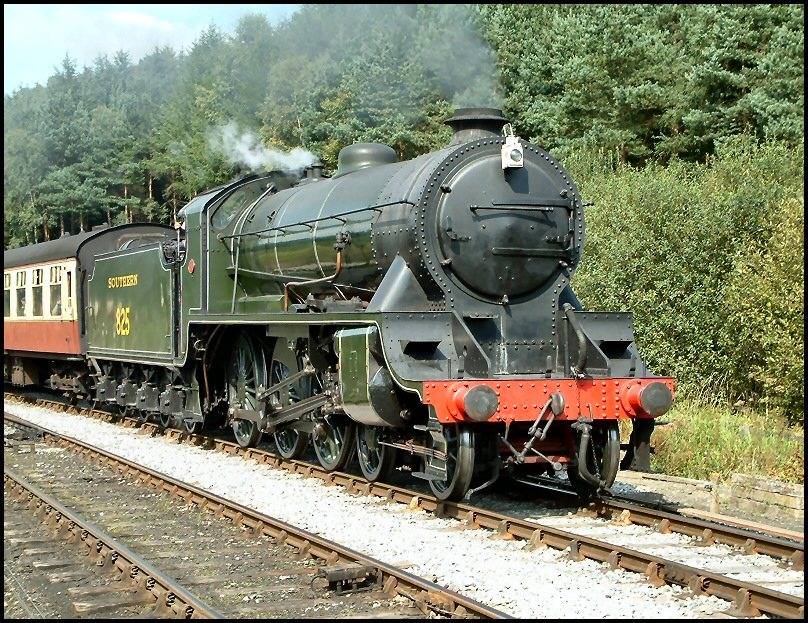
825 approaching Levisham Station on the North Yorkshire Moors railway

The first Southern Railway livery continued that of the LSWR, but with the number displayed on the tender. However from 1925, a darker Olive-type green was substituted, and the entire class was so painted. Wheels were green with black tyres, and the cabside numbers were replaced by a cast oval number plate with "Southern Railway" around the edge and the number in the centre. Primrose Yellow "Southern" and locomotive number transfers were placed on the tender tank. From 1927, the Maunsell locomotives were given black livery with green lining, and remained in that guise with little modification until nationalisation.

The only slight livery modification occurred before the Second World War, when Oliver Bulleid introduced the "Sunshine Yellow" lettering and numbering. A further modification was the application of a green shaded "Sunshine" lettering during the war. This was finally reverted to "Sunshine Yellow" lettering and numbering after the war. Nos. 496–515 were built between 1919 and 1921, and Nos. 823–837 were delivered from Eastleigh during 1927 and 1928 and a further 10 locomotives, No.838–847, were authorised in 1931.

=== British Railways ===
After a period in British Railways transitional livery the entire class was painted in British Railways Goods Black livery with no lining, the numbering located on the cab-sides and the British Railways crest on the tender sides. Numbering was initially as per Southern Railway with an "S" prefix, but the locomotives were eventually re-numbered under the British Railways standard numbering system according to batch. They were numbered in the series of 30496–30515 for the Urie locomotives, 30823–30837 for the second batch, and 30838–30847 for the third batch.
