= British Rail Class D3/12 =

Class of diesel electric locomotives

Southern Railway diesels 1–3 British Rail Class D3/12
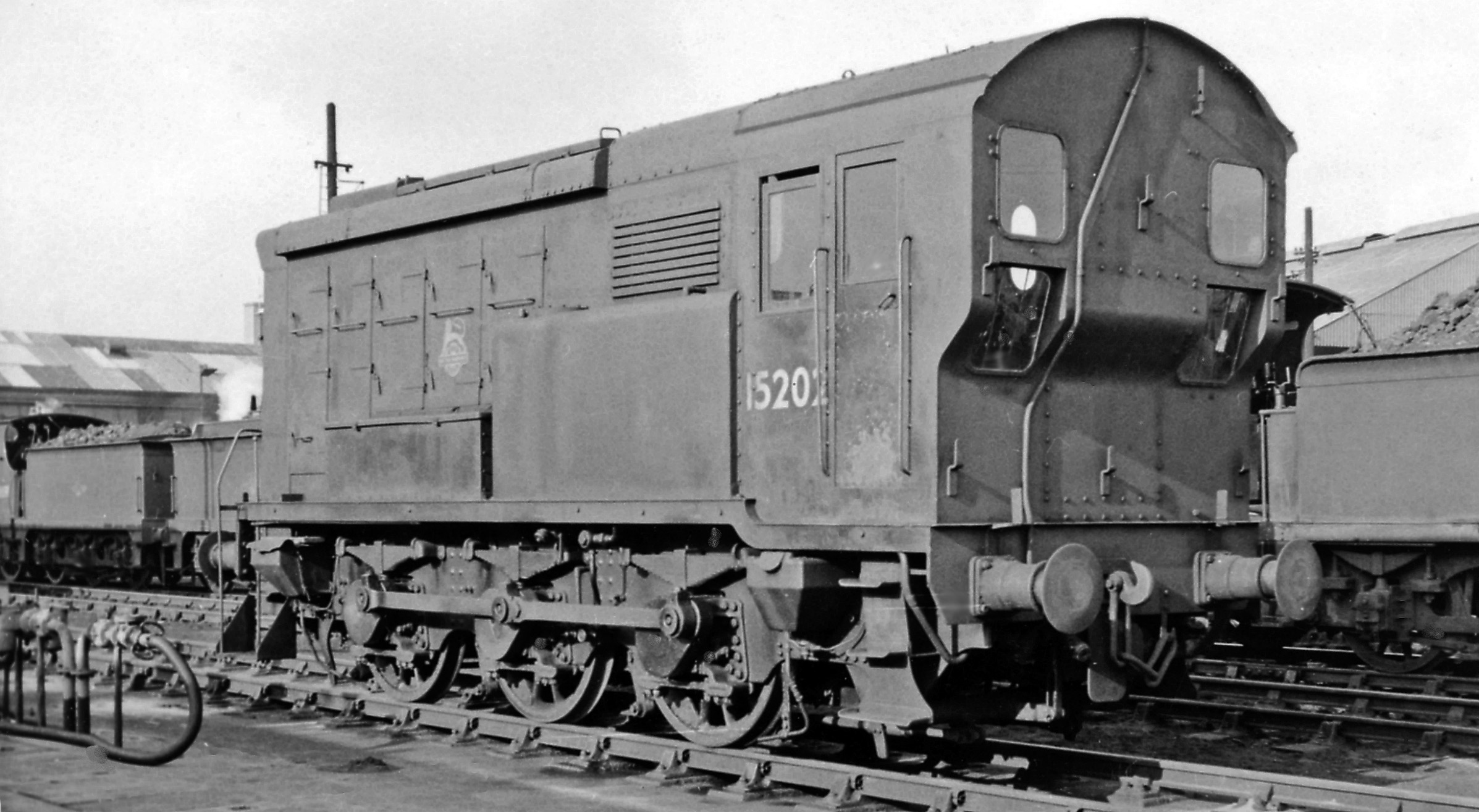
- Ex-SR 0-6-0 Diesel-electric shunter 15202 at Hither Green Locomotive Depot, looking north-east in the Locomotive Yard. 12 March 1960
Type and origin
- Power type: Diesel-electric
- Builder: Southern Railway, Ashford Works; English Electric Co. Ltd, Preston Works
- Order number: SR A936/37
- Build date: 1937
- Total produced: 3
Specifications
- Configuration
  - Whyte: 0-6-0DE
  - UIC: C
- Gauge: 4 ft 8 1/2 in (1,435 mm) standard gauge
- Wheel diameter: 4 ft 6 in (1.372 m)
- Minimum curve: 3 chains (198.00 ft; 60.35 m)
- Wheelbase: 11 ft 6 in (3.505 m)
- Length: 30 ft 3.25 in (9.227 m)
- Width: 8 ft 5.5 in (2.578 m)
- Height: 12 ft 9 in (3.886 m)
- Loco weight: 55 long tons 5 cwt (123,800 lb or 56.1 t); 56.1 t; 61.9 short tons
- Fuel capacity: 600 imp gal (2,700 L; 720 US gal)
- Prime mover: English Electric 6K
- Traction motors: English Electric, 2 off
- MU working: Not fitted
- Train heating: None
Performance figures
- Maximum speed: 30 mph (48 km/h)
- Power output: Engine: 350 bhp (260 kW)
- Tractive effort: 30,000 lbf (133.4 kN)
Career
- Operators: Southern Railway; → British Railways
- Class: BR: D3/12; later 3/9A
- Numbers: SR: 1–3; BR: 15201–15203
- Withdrawn: 1964
- Disposition: All scrapped

British Rail class D3/12 was a class of three experimental diesel-electric shunting locomotives designed by Richard Maunsell of the Southern Railway in 1937. They quickly proved their effectiveness, but the Second World War prevented more of them being built. Oliver Bulleid based the British Rail Class 12 on them in 1949.

== Background and Construction ==
Once the UK economy began to improve in the mid 1930s, the Southern Railway had further need for heavy shunting locomotives in its marshalling yards around London. The Z class steam locomotives had proved successful for this task but Maunsell wanted to compare their performance with diesel-electric alternatives. He therefore sought authorisation for the construction of three experimental locomotives for use in the busy Norwood marshalling yard where there was a continuous need for such locomotives. No private manufacturer was in a position to build the new locomotives and so they were jointly constructed by the Southern Railway's Ashford works, who constructed the framing, cabs and bodywork, and English Electric Ltd of Preston, who fitted the traction motors. The three locomotives were also provided with duplicate controls to enable them to be driven by one man from either side of the cab. They were delivered during September and October 1937.

== Operation ==
After a few teething problems, the class quickly proved the advantages of diesel electric shunters in terms of effectiveness, cost-saving, and driver comfort. Although at £7,275 they cost £1,100 more to build than a Z class steam locomotive, each one saved about £1,700 per year in operating costs. They could be used continually day and night for six days each week at Norwood without any service requirement beyond refuelling. They were however found to be too slow for their secondary task of freight transfers around the congested passenger lines in the London area, although perfectly well suited to this traffic on rural lines.

As a result of these experiments Maunsell's successor, Oliver Bulleid, received authorisation to build a further eight members of the class in July 1939 but this order was quickly cancelled as a result of the outbreak of the Second World War.

Between 1941 and 1945 the locomotives were commandeered by the War Department for use on the Martin Mill military railway to haul cross-channel gun installations and ammunition. (Diesel locomotives were required for this task as they would not give away their position to enemy gunners.) They were returned to the Southern Railway in 1945.

Following the formation of British Railways in 1948, twenty-six similar, but lighter locomotives were constructed to Bulleid's design. These later became British Rail Class 12. The three original locomotives continued their traditional work around London. Two of the locomotives were however loaned to the Western Region between 1951 and 1953 for use at the Acton marshalling yard. After replacement at Norwood by more modern locomotives they worked as shunters at Hither Green marshalling yard, at Eastleigh and Ashford works. One was also tried out at Lancing Carriage Works in 1961 as a replacement for the aged "Stroudley Terrier" but was found to be too slow.

Although they were still in good operating condition, the locomotives were withdrawn in November and December 1964, as by then the Southern Region had many modern replacements. None have been preserved.

== Numbering ==
The original intention was to number the locomotives 958 to 960, following on from the steam locomotives of the Z class, but as delivered they were numbered 1 to 3 in a separate list from the SR's steam locomotives. They were later renumbered by British Railways 15201–15203.

== See also ==
- List of British Rail classes
- Southern Railway diesels
