= LSWR H16 class =

Class of British steam locomotives

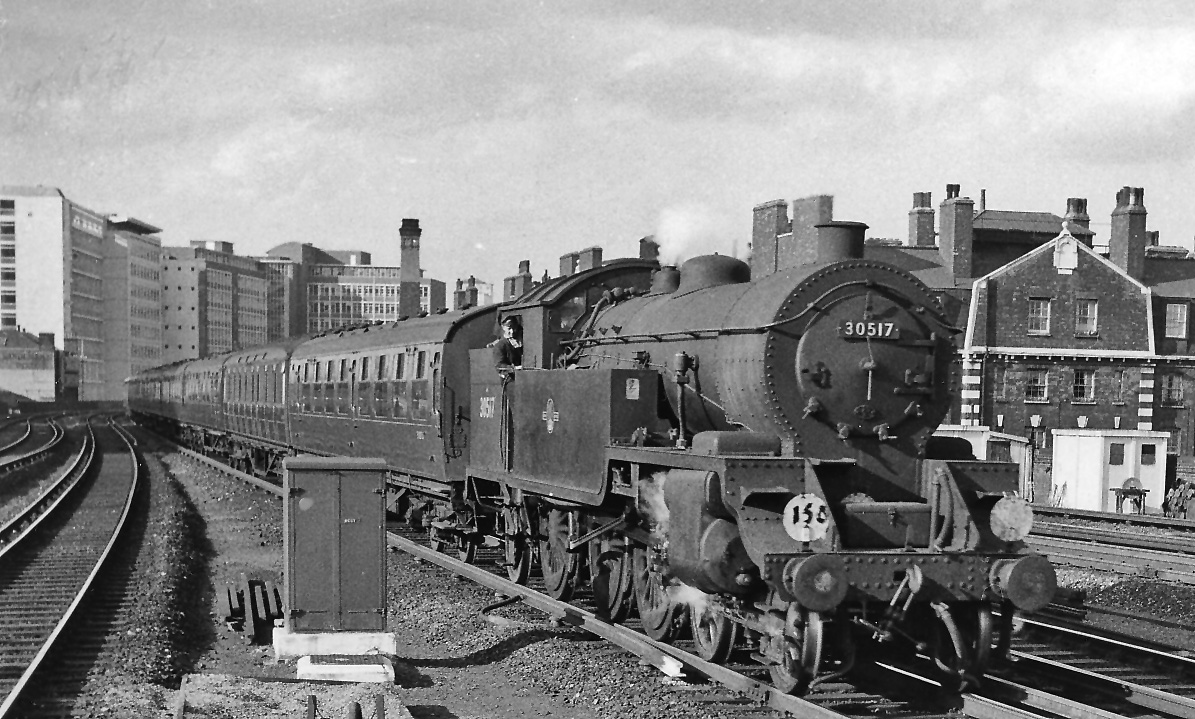
- H16 class 4-6-2T No. 30517 takes an empty stock train from Waterloo through Vauxhall on Saturday 25 August 1962
Type and origin
- Power type: Steam
- Builder: LSWR Eastleigh Works
- Build date: November 1921 – February 1922
- Total produced: 5
Specifications
- Configuration
  - Whyte: 4-6-2T
  - UIC: 2′C1′ h2tG
- Gauge: 4 ft 8 1/2 in (1,435 mm)
- Leading dia.: 3 ft 7 in (1.092 m)
- Driver dia.: 5 ft 7 in (1.702 m)
- Trailing dia.: 3 ft 7 in (1.092 m)
- Length: 46 ft 0 in (14.02 m)
- Width: 9 ft 2 in (2.79 m)
- Height: 13 ft 3 1/4 in (4.04 m)
- Axle load: 19.8 long tons (20.1 t)
- Loco weight: 96.4 long tons (97.9 t)
- Fuel type: Coal
- Fuel capacity: 3.5 long tons (3.6 t)
- Water cap.: 2,000 imp gal (9,100 L; 2,400 US gal)
- Firebox
  - Grate area: 27 sq ft (2.5 m^{2})
- Boiler pressure: 180 psi (1.24 MPa)
- Heating surface
  - Firebox: 139 sq ft (12.9 m^{2})
  - Tubes and flues: 1,267 sq ft (117.7 m^{2})
- Superheater
  - Type: Eastleigh (later Maunsell)
  - Heating area: 231 sq ft (21.5 m^{2})
- Cylinders: Two, outside
- Cylinder size: 21 in × 28 in (533 mm × 711 mm)
Performance figures
- Tractive effort: 28,200 lbf (125.4 kN)
Career
- Operators: London and South Western Railway; → Southern Railway; → British Railways
- Class: LSWR / SR: H16
- Power class: LSWR/ SR: A; BR: 5F (later 6F)
- Numbers: LSWR: 516–520; SR: E516–E520 → 516–520; BR: 30516–30520
- Nicknames: Green Tanks
- Withdrawn: 1962
- Disposition: All scrapped

The LSWR H16 class were five 4-6-2T tank locomotives designed by Robert Urie for the London and South Western Railway (LSWR) in 1921–1922. They were the last new design for the LSWR and their only Pacific-type design.

== Background ==
As part of the project to construct a marshalling yard at Feltham in West London, Urie produced two locomotive designs, the G16 "Black Tanks" to shunt the new yard, and the H16 "Green Tanks" to work transfer freights to the London area yards of the other railway companies.

== Construction history ==
Year	Order	Quantity	LSWR numbers	Notes
1921–22	H16	5	516–520	

== Livery and numbering ==
=== LSWR and Southern Railway ===
When originally built they were numbered 516–520.

On passing to the Southern Railway, they had their LSWR numbers prefixed with an 'E'. The locomotives lost the prefix between 1931 and 1932. Under the new locomotive classification system for constituent companies of the SR, they were classified as G6/7/1 1/4 for Goods, Grade (hauling power), Power and Range (route availability). The Southern Railway painted the H16 class in passenger green paint, rather than goods engine black.

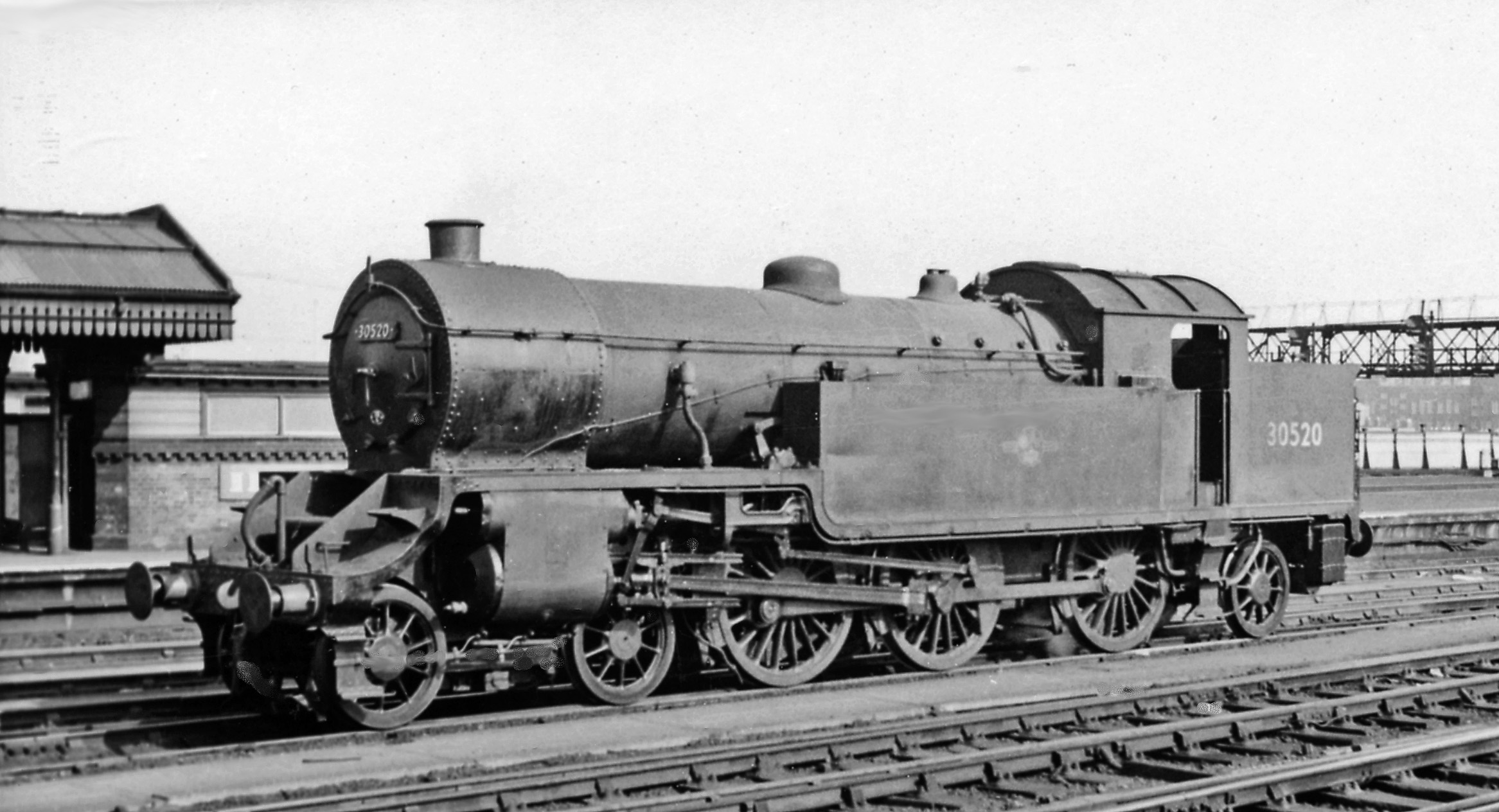
H16 class 4-6-2T No. 30520 (on empty stock duty at Clapham Junction 1960.

=== Post-1948 (nationalisation) ===
All five engines were passed to British Railways, who renumbered them 30516–30520. All were withdrawn and scrapped in 1962.
