= LMS diesel shunter 7052 =

LMS 7052
Type and origin
- Power type: Diesel-mechanical
- Builder: Hunslet Engine Company
- Build date: January 1934
- Total produced: 1
Specifications
- Configuration
  - Whyte: 0-6-0DM
  - UIC: C
- Gauge: 4 ft 8 1/2 in (1,435 mm)
- Wheel diameter: 3 ft 4 in (1.016 m)
- Wheelbase: 9 ft 0 in (2.74 m)
- Length: 24 ft 8.5 in (7.53 m)
- Width: 8 ft 3 in (2.51 m)
- Height: 12 ft 1 in (3.68 m)
- Loco weight: 25.5 long tons (25.9 t)
- Fuel capacity: 100 imp gal (450 L; 120 US gal)
- Prime mover: McLaren-Benz 8MDB 8-cyl
- Transmission: Hunslet Engine Co.
- Train heating: None
- Loco brake: Air
- Train brakes: None
Performance figures
- Maximum speed: 8 mph (13 km/h)
- Power output: 150 hp (112 kW) at 1000 rpm
- Tractive effort: Max: 13,200 lbf (58.7 kN)
Career
- Operators: London, Midland and Scottish Railway; War Department
- Numbers: LMS 7052; WD 24
- Withdrawn: See text
- Disposition: Scrapped

LMS diesel shunter 7052 was an experimental 0-6-0 diesel-mechanical shunting locomotive, introduced by the London Midland and Scottish Railway (LMSR) in 1934 and which remained in service with that railway for six years. It was later acquired for military use until 1966.

== History ==
No. 7052 locomotive was an experimental locomotive built by the Hunslet Engine Company at their Leeds works in 1934. It carried an original number of 7402 only within the works and was delivered as LMSR as number 7052. For six years it was used for shunting at Leeds before being loaned to the Air Ministry in 1940. It was loaned to the War Department between 1940 and 1942, which numbered it 24. It was withdrawn from LMS stock in December 1943 and sold for use at RNAD Broughton Moor, near Maryport, for which use it was flameproofed by Hunslet. After withdrawal in 1966, it was sold to a scrap metal company in Long Marston, which used it as a yard shunter for a further three years, after which it was scrapped.
