= GWR diesel shunters =

UK locomotives

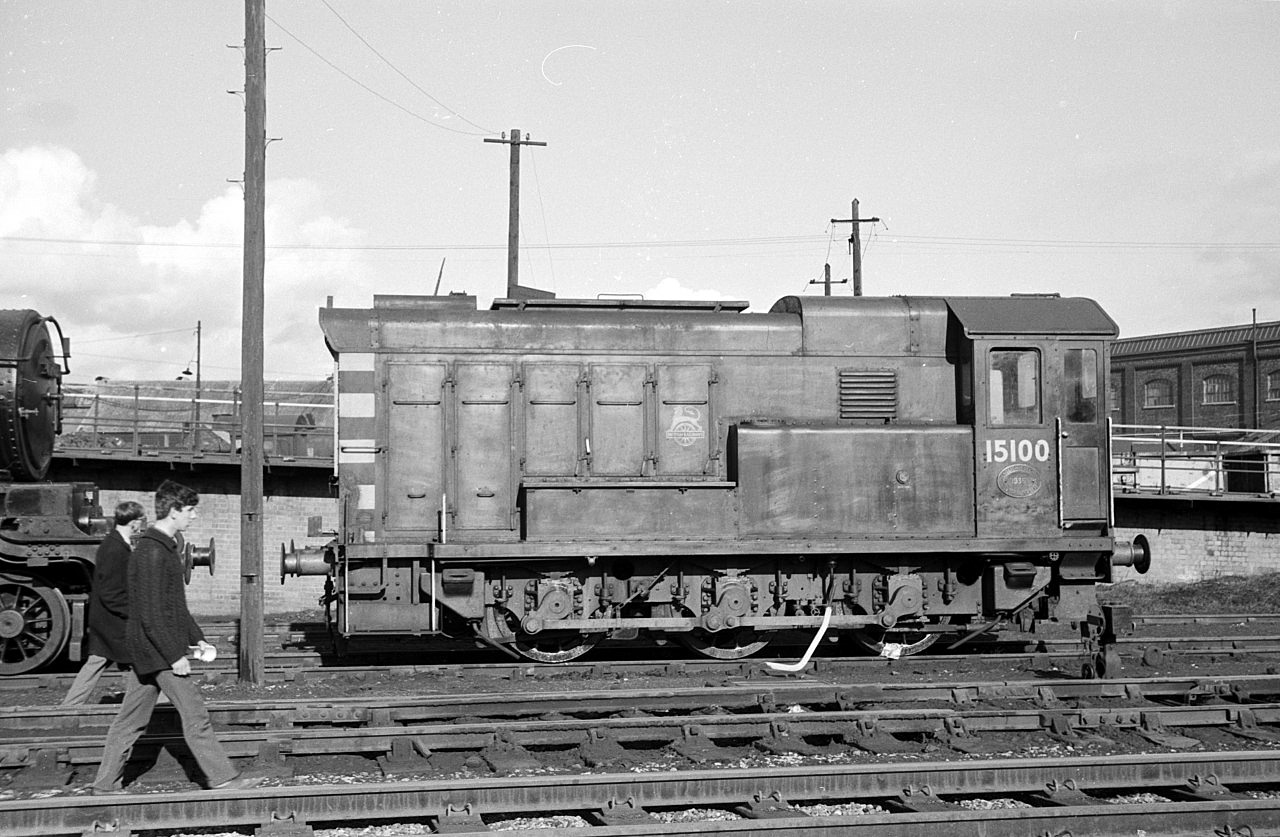
GWR number 2 running as BR 15100 in 1963

The Great Western Railway diesel shunters were a small number of diesel locomotives purchased or ordered by the Great Western Railway (GWR) in the 1930s and 1940s. The first was delivered in 1933 (but sold in 1940), A second, larger, shunter was delivered in 1936 and seven more were ordered a further seven before Nationalisation in 1948 but were delivered to British Railways (BR) over the next two years.

== Background ==
The GWR first experimented with an internal combustion engine was in an experimental railcar in 1911. This was followed by some small petrol-engined shunters and ganger's trolleys. The London Midland and Scottish Railway (LMSR) bought a small diesel narrow gauge shunter for Crewe Works in 1930 but it was the GWR who put the first standard gauge diesel locmotive to work when their number 1 in 1933.

The GWR followed this locomotive several larger shunters and a fleet of diesel railcars and ordered two larger gas turbine-electric locomotives for use on the main line which were delivered as British Railways numbers 18000 and 18100.

== Locomotive details ==
The nine locomotives were built to four different designs.

GWR diesel shunters
GWR number	BR number	Type	Builder	Engine	hp	In service	Withdrawn
1	—	0-4-0DM	Fowler	Fowler	70	1933	1940
2	15100	0-6-0DE	Hawthorn, Leslie	English Electric	350	1935	1965
501	15107	0-6-0DE	GWR	Brush	360	1949	1958
502	15101	0-6-0DE	GWR	English Electric	350	1948	1967
503	15102	0-6-0DE	GWR	English Electric	350	1948	1967
504	15103	0-6-0DE	GWR	English Electric	350	1948	1967
505	15104	0-6-0DE	GWR	English Electric	350	1948	1967
506	15105	0-6-0DE	GWR	English Electric	350	1948	1967
507	15106	0-6-0DE	GWR	English Electric	350	1948	1967

=== 1 ===
This locomotive was built by John Fowler & Co. in 1933 as their works number 19451. It was a 0-4-0DM with a 70 hp (52 kW) engine, 3 ft (91 cm) diameter wheels and a wheelbase of 5 ft 6 in (1.68 m). Unusually for the GWR, it was fitted with a Westinghouse brake. The GWR allocated it to Diagram B in their Internal Combustion Engine diagram book. It saw service at Swindon Works but was taken out of stock and placed in the 'Spare Machinery Account' in September 1939. It was sold in March 1940 to a dealer, George Cohen, Sons and Company, but was soon sold on to the Ministry of Supply.

Before entering service it was used as a demonstrator and Fowler's built many similar locomotives for other companies including LMSR Departmental 2 in 1936.

=== 2 (BR 15100) ===
GWR number 2 was built by R. & W. Hawthorn, Leslie and Company in 1935 with works number 3853. It was a 0-6-0DE with a 350 hp (260 kW) engine, 4 ft 0.25 in (122.56 cm) diameter wheels and a wheelbase of 11 ft 6 in (3.51 m). It was given number 15100 by British Railways.

It was initially allocated to Swindon but soon moved to Old Oak Common Depot before being transferred to Swansea East Dock in 1939. It was moved to St Philip's Marsh in 1949 and spent most of its time working at Old Oak Common, Swindon and Bristol until it was withdrawn in May 1965. It was cut up at Swindon in February 1966.

=== 501 (BR 15107) ===
The GWR ordered an engine from Brush for number 501 which it built at Swindon Works. It was completed in November 1949 by which time GWR had been nationalised into BR and so it emerged as number 15107. It was a 0-6-0DE with a 360 hp (270 kW) engine, 4 ft 0.25 in (122.56 cm) diameter wheels and a wheelbase of 11 ft 6 in (3.51 m).

It was initially allocated to St Philip's Marsh in November 1949 where 15100 had been working since January. It remained there for nine years but was taken to Swindon Works in February 1957 and stored until officially withdrawn in June 1958. It was cut up three months later.

=== 502–507 (BR 15101–15106) ===
The GWR ordered six engines from English Electric for a batch of shunters which were to be built at Swindon Works and numbered 502 to 507. They were completed between April and July 1948 by which time GWR had been nationalised into BR and so they were given numbers 15101 to 15106 although 502 did carry its GWR number during construction. They were 0-6-0DEs with a 350 hp (260 kW) engine, 4 ft 0.25 in (122.56 cm) diameter wheels and a wheelbase of 11 ft 6 in (3.51 m).

They were allocated at various times to Old Oak Common, Swindon and depots in Cardiff. Most ended up at depots in the Birmingham area.

- 15101 entered service April 1948, withdrawn August 1967 and cut up in 1968
- 15102 entered service April 1948, withdrawn July 1967 and cut up in 1968
- 15103 entered service May 1948, withdrawn August 1967 and cut up in 1968
- 15104 entered service May 1948, withdrawn July 1967 and cut up in 1968
- 15105 entered service July 1948, withdrawn August 1967 and cut up in 1970
- 15106 entered service July 1948, withdrawn August 1967 and cut up in 1969

== See also ==
- Locomotives of the Great Western Railway
- LMS diesel shunters
- LNER internal combustion locomotives
- Southern Railway diesels
