= British Rail Class 12 =

Diesel locomotive class (1949–1971)

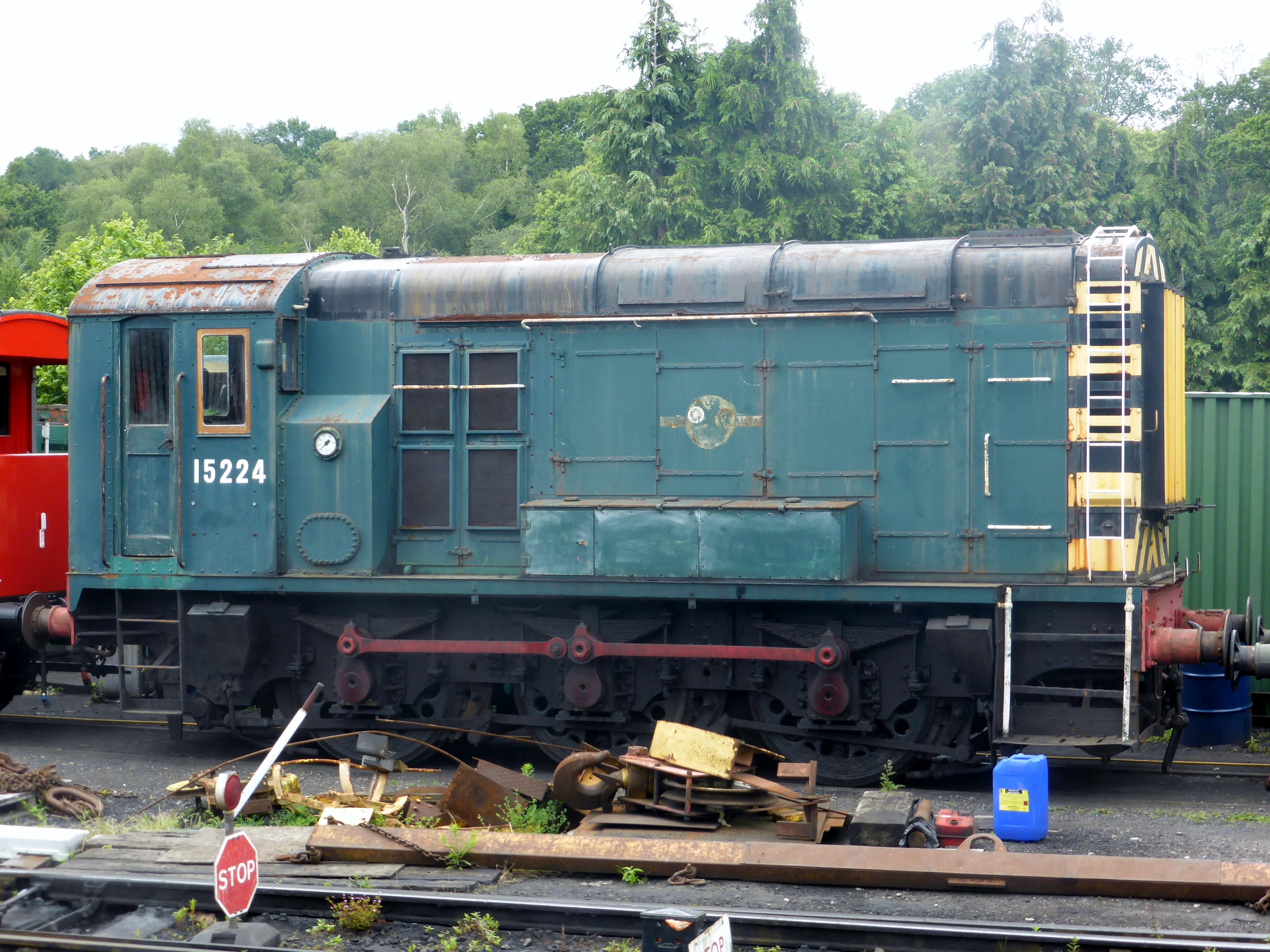
- 15224 at Tunbridge Wells West, Spa Valley Railway
Type and origin
- Power type: Diesel-electric
- Builder: British Railways Ashford Works
- Order number: SR 3413 (15), 3537 (11)
- Build date: 1949–1952
- Total produced: 26
Specifications
- Configuration
  - Whyte: 0-6-0DE
  - UIC: C
- Gauge: 4 ft 8 1/2 in (1,435 mm) standard gauge
- Wheel diameter: 4 ft 6 in (1.372 m)
- Wheelbase: 11 ft 6 in (3.51 m)
- Length: 29 ft 5 1/2 in (8.98 m)
- Width: 9 ft 0 in (2.74 m)
- Height: 12 ft 8 1/2 in (3.87 m)
- Loco weight: 48 long tons (48.8 t; 53.8 short tons)
- Fuel capacity: 660 imp gal (3,000 L; 790 US gal)
- Prime mover: English Electric 6KT
- Generator: English Electric 801/7D (DC)
- Traction motors: English Electric 506A, 2 off
- Transmission: Diesel electric, double reduction gearing
- MU working: Not fitted
- Train heating: None
- Train brakes: None; 15230–15232 Air from 1970
Performance figures
- Maximum speed: 27.5 mph (44.3 km/h)
- Power output: Engine: 350 hp (261 kW)
- Tractive effort: Maximum: 24,600 lbf (109.4 kN)
Career
- Operators: British Railways
- Class: D3/13, later 3/9, later Class 12
- Numbers: 15211–15236
- Axle load class: RA 5
- Withdrawn: 1968-1971
- Preserved: 15224 at the Spa Valley Railway
- Disposition: One preserved, remainder scrapped

The British Rail Class 12 is a diesel locomotive built primarily for shunting duties around London.

== History ==
This was the second batch of Southern Railway (SR) shunters based on the English Electric 6KT 350 hp (260 kW) diesel engine. The first experimental batch (BR numbers 15201–15203) were designed by Richard Maunsell of the SR in 1937 and were later classified D3/12. These locomotives were Oliver Bulleid's development of Maunsell's original design, but were significantly lighter. They featured Bulleid's distinctive BFB wheels, and incorporated a number of details from the diesel-electric shunters produced by the London, Midland and Scottish Railway 1936–39. They were built at the BR Ashford Works over the period 1949–1952 and numbered 15211–15236. They later became Class 12, but no locomotives survived long enough to acquire Class 12 TOPS numbers.

== Technical details ==
The diesel engine is an English Electric 6-cylinder, 4-stroke, 6KT and the traction motors are two EE506 axle-hung, nose-suspended, force-ventilated traction motors with 17.5:1 double reduction gear drive. The main generator is an EE type EE801/7D, flange-mounted single bearing rated at 490 kW.

== Operational details ==
The locomotives were designed for use in the two South London marshalling yards at Norwood Junction and Hither Green, and remained there for much of their working lives.

Four (15230–15233) were fitted with air train braking originally for the 1966 Bournemouth line electrification scheme and the need for air brake depot shunters and station pilots; based at Bournemouth in 1967 but re-allocated in 1968 to Ashford and then often used at Dover shunting continental ferry vans before Classes 08 and 09 were generally converted to this system. They were also utilised as works shunters at Ashford, Brighton and Eastleigh.

== Withdrawal and preservation ==
The entire class was withdrawn between 1968 and 1971 and most were scrapped soon afterwards. However, three were sold for industrial use with two of those locomotives being scrapped later on. One, 15222, had been used as a generator by a quarry in South Wales having been acquired from the Newport scrapyard of John Cashmore Ltd. A second, 15231, was sold by BR to Tilling Construction at Grassington. The third, 15224, was sold by BR to the National Coal Board for use in the Kent Coalfield. It was used at Betteshanger and Snowdown collieries, and was preserved in 1982. It is now the only surviving locomotive of the class, and is awaiting overhaul at the Spa Valley Railway, Royal Tunbridge Wells. A detailed overhaul and restoration scoping plan is in development; the locomotive requires a complete re-wire as the original wiring is suffering age related deterioration. As of January 2021, the project is on hold awaiting suitable funding.

Table of withdrawals
| Year | Quantity in service at start of year | Quantity withdrawn | Locomotive numbers |
|---|---|---|---|
| 1968 | 26 | 4 | 15213/15/34/36. |
| 1969 | 22 | 5 | 15216/23/26/28/33. |
| 1970 | 17 | 3 | 15217–18/27. |
| 1971 | 14 | 14 | 15211–12/14/19–22/24–25/29–32/35. |

== Model railways ==
Model Rail offer a Class 12 in OO gauge, made in conjunction with Heljan.
