= SR Q1 class =

Class of 0-6-0 freight engines designed by Oliver Bulleid

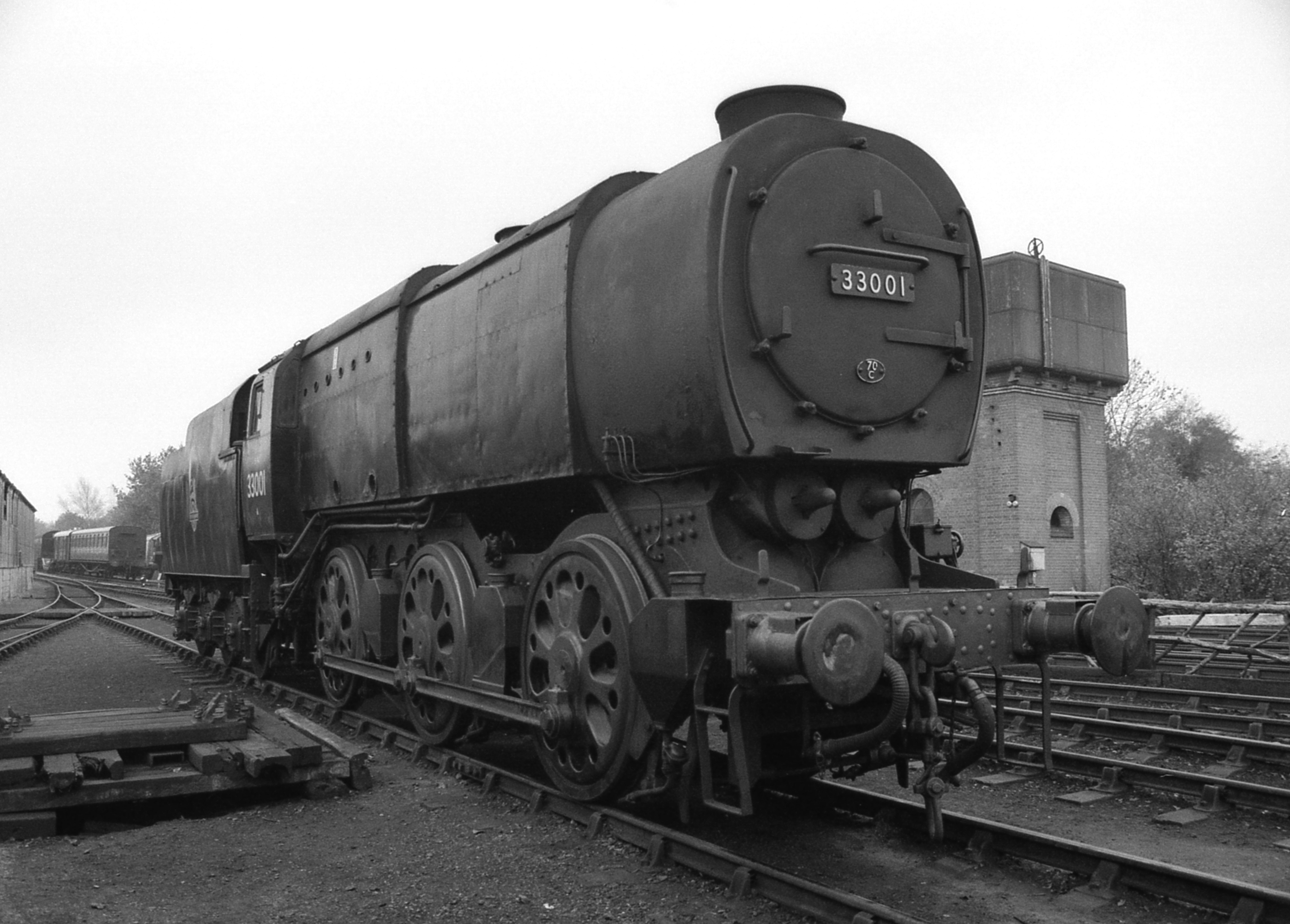
Type and origin
- Power type: Steam
- Designer: Oliver Bulleid
- Builder: SR Brighton Works (20); SR Ashford Works (20)
- Build date: 1942
- Total produced: 40
Specifications
- Configuration
  - Whyte: 0-6-0
  - UIC: C h2
- Gauge: 4 ft 8 1/2 in (1,435 mm) standard gauge
- Driver dia.: 5 ft 1 in (1.549 m)
- Tender wheels: 3 ft 7 in (1.092 m)
- Wheelbase
  - Axle spacing (Asymmetrical): 8 ft 0 in (2.44 m) +; 8 ft 6 in (2.59 m)
  - Engine: 16 ft 6 in (5.03 m)
  - Tender: 13 ft 0 in (3.96 m) equally divided
  - incl. tender: 40 ft 7 1/2 in (12.38 m)
- Length
  - Over buffers: 54 ft 10 1/2 in (16.73 m)
- Width: 8 ft 5 in (2.57 m)
- Height: 12 ft 10 1/2 in (3.92 m)
- Axle load
  - 1st coupled: 16 long tons 6 cwt (36,500 lb or 16.6 t)
  - 2nd coupled: 18 long tons 5 cwt (40,900 lb or 18.5 t)
  - 3rd coupled: 16 long tons 4 cwt (36,300 lb or 16.5 t)
  - Tender axle: Axle 1: 11 long tons 14 cwt (26,200 lb or 11.9 t); Axle 2: 12 long tons 2 cwt (27,100 lb or 12.3 t); Axle 1: 14 long tons 4 cwt (31,800 lb or 14.4 t)
- Loco weight: 51 long tons 5 cwt (114,800 lb or 52.1 t)
- Tender weight: 38 long tons 0 cwt (85,100 lb or 38.6 t)
- Total weight: 89 long tons 5 cwt (199,900 lb or 90.7 t)
- Fuel type: Coal
- Fuel capacity: 5 long tons 0 cwt (11,200 lb or 5.1 t); 5.1 t; 5.6 short tons
- Water cap.: 3,700 imp gal (16,800 L; 4,440 US gal)
- Firebox
  - Grate area: 27 sq ft (2.51 m^{2})
- Boiler
  - Pitch: 9 ft 2 in (2.79 m)
  - Tube plates: 9 ft 9 1/4 in (2.978 m)
- Boiler pressure: 230 lbf/in^{2} (1.59 MPa)
- Heating surface
  - Firebox: 170 sq ft (15.79 m^{2})
  - Tubes and flues: 1,302 sq ft (120.96 m^{2})
  - Total surface: 1,472 sq ft (136.75 m^{2})
- Superheater
  - Heating area: 218 sq ft (20.25 m^{2})
- Cylinders: Two, inside
- Cylinder size: 19 in × 26 in (483 mm × 660 mm)
- Valve gear: Stephenson
- Valve type: Piston, outside admission
- Valve travel: 6 1/8 in (155.58 mm)
- Valve lap: 1 5/8 in (41.28 mm)
Performance figures
- Tractive effort: 30,080 lbf (133.80 kN)
Career
- Operators: Southern Railway; → British Railways
- Class: SR: Q1
- Power class: BR: 5FA (later 5F)
- Numbers: SR: C1 – C40; BR: 33001–33040
- Nicknames: Coffee Pots; Charlies; Ugly Ducklings
- Locale: Southern Region
- Withdrawn: 1963–1966
- Preserved: C1
- Current owner: National Railway Museum
- Disposition: One preserved, remainder scrapped

The SR Q1 class is a type of austerity steam locomotive constructed during the Second World War. The class was designed by Oliver Bulleid for use on the intensive freight turns experienced during wartime on the Southern Railway network. A total of 40 locomotives were built. Bulleid incorporated many innovations and weight-saving concepts to produce a highly functional design. The class lasted in service until July 1966, and the first member of the class, number C1, has been preserved by the National Railway Museum.

The highly unusual and controversial design represents the ultimate development of the British 0-6-0 freight engine, capable of hauling trains that were usually allocated to much larger locomotives on other railways. Nicknames for the class included "Ugly Ducklings", "Coffee Pots", "Charlies", "Biscuit Tins", "Biscuit Barrels", "Clockworks" and "Frankensteins".

== Background ==
In late 1939, the Southern Railway, until then primarily a high-density commuter railway serving London and South-East England, much of it electrified with third-rail pick-up, found itself on the British front line of the Second World War, with a severe lack of modern freight-handling capability. The newest freight design was the Q class 0-6-0 of 1938, the last locomotive designed by Richard Maunsell. Built to essentially Victorian era principles, these had been designed as replacements for many of the older 0-6-0s inherited by the Southern Railway in 1923, and entered service in January 1938. Maunsell, having retired at the end of October 1937, was replaced by Oliver Bulleid.

The Southern Railway became an essential strategic war-asset because of its proximity to continental Europe, and needed to equip itself with adequate freight-handling capability to transport the vast quantities of supplies and troops required for the conflict. The brief stipulated high route availability and high tractive effort.

== Construction history ==
The answer to this problem came from the drawing board of the Southern Railway's innovative Chief Mechanical Engineer, Oliver Bulleid, in the shape of the Q1. Using the minimum amount of raw materials, and with all superfluous features stripped away, he produced in 1942 the most powerful 0-6-0 steam locomotive ever to run on Britain's railways. The first twenty locomotives were constructed at Brighton railway works and the remaining twenty at Ashford railway works. Powerful and light, the Q1s formed the backbone of the Southern's heavy freight capability. The engine weighed less than 90 tons (90.6 tonnes) and could be used on more than 97% of the Southern Railway's route mileage.

=== Design ===
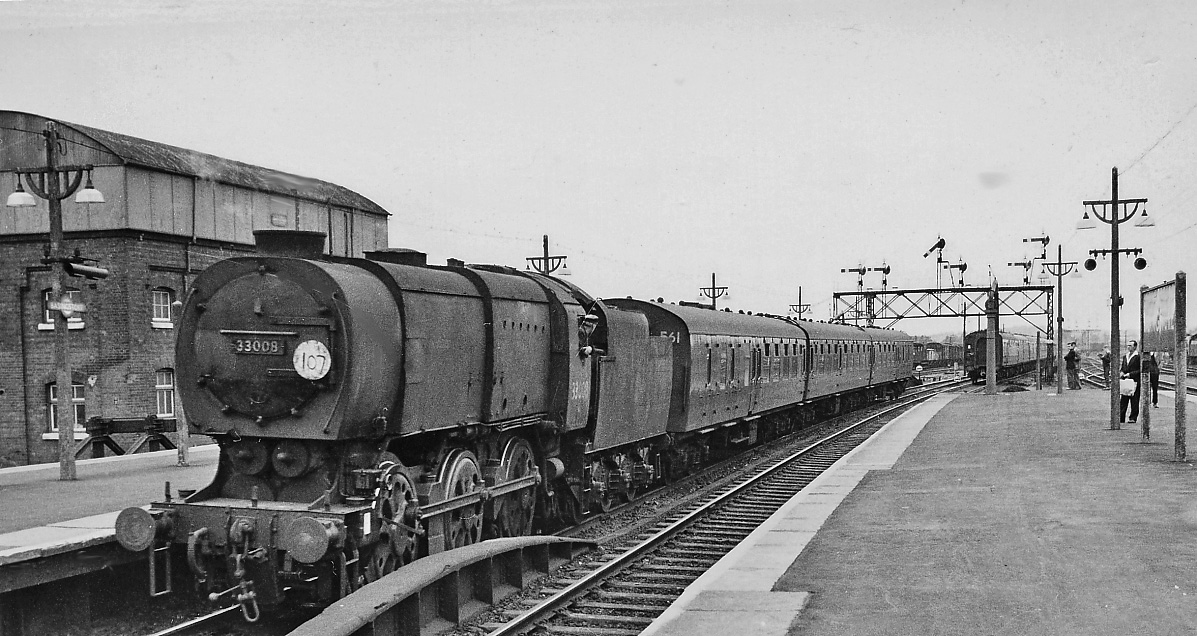
33008 at Basingstoke Station

The class was one of several built under the wartime austerity regime, which stressed pure functionality above any considerations of style or decoration. This austere approach to the design explains its functional appearance. One aspect of their shape was that, like Bulleid's SR Merchant Navy class and SR West Country and Battle of Britain classes, they could be simply driven through a coach-washer for cleaning at a time when manpower for this time-consuming chore could not be spared.

The unusual shape was also dictated by the use of materials; the lagging was made of a glass fibre insulation material known as 'Idaglass', which, although cheap and plentiful during the war years, could not support any weight, and therefore a separate casing was required which followed that seen in the Merchant Navy class locomotives, and the boiler rings were adapted to lend the lagging the support needed. A copper, rather than steel, firebox was utilised, unlike Bulleid's Pacific designs. The wheels were smaller, 5 ft 1 in (1.55 m) adaptations of the Bulleid Firth Brown wheels utilised on the Pacifics. The locomotive had two cylinders with Stephenson link outside admission piston valves, having a travel in full gear of 6 1/8 in (155.58 mm) and a steam lap of 1 5/8 in (41.28 mm). It was provided with a five-nozzle blast-pipe.

The boiler design was based upon that of the Lord Nelson class, and the firebox used the same throatplate and backplate. The boiler barrel measured 10 ft 6 in (3.20 m) in length, with diameters of 5 ft 0 in (1.52 m) at the front and 5 ft 9 in (1.75 m) at the back. The grate area was 27 sq ft (2.51 m^{2}), the heating surface of the 209 tubes and 21 flues was 1,302 sq ft (120.96 m^{2}), that of the firebox was 170 sq ft (15.79 m^{2}) giving a total evaporative heating surface of 1,472 sq ft (136.75 m^{2}); the superheater heating surface was 218 sq ft (20.25 m^{2}).

== Operational details ==
The Q1 was the final development of the British 0-6-0 main line steam locomotive. Later designs of medium-powered freight locomotives, such as the LMS Ivatt Class 2 2-6-0 and LMS Ivatt Class 4 Moguls, had a 2-6-0 wheel arrangement: the 0-6-0 wheel arrangement was not used in the BR Standard designs of locomotive.

BR classified the Q1 class in the power classification 5F. This was unusual: few other 0-6-0s exceeded the classification of 4F. Notable exceptions were the LNER Class J20 (5F), LNER Class J39 (4P5F) and LNER Class J38 (6F).

The Q1's route availability meant that although they were primarily freight locomotives they also frequently deputised on secondary passenger services. However, the class gained a reputation for poor braking on unfitted freight trains due to the light construction of the tender braking system.

The Q1s thrived on their intended duties during World War II, and were an indispensable addition to the Southern locomotive fleet, to such an extent that they all remained in service until the 1960s, long after they were intended to cease operation as an "austerity" design. Withdrawals began in 1963, when one had a broken cylinder that was deemed not worthy of repairing. The last example of the class was withdrawn in 1966.

Table of withdrawals
Year	Quantity in service at start of year	Quantity withdrawn	Locomotive numbers
1963	40	13	33002/05/08/11/13/16/19/21/24–25/28/31/37.
1964	27	20	33001/03/07/10/12/14–15/17/22–23/29–30/32–36/38–40.
1965	7	4	33004/09/18/26.
1966	3	3	33006/20/27.

== Livery and numbering ==
=== Southern Railway and Bulleid numbering system ===
Livery of the Q1 Class was plain freight black, with Sunshine Yellow numbering on the cabside, and "Southern" lettering on the tender, shaded in green. Bulleid advocated a continental style of locomotive nomenclature, based upon his experiences at the French branch of Westinghouse Electric before the First World War, and those of his tenure in the rail operating department during that conflict. The Southern Railway number followed an adaptation of the UIC classification system where "C" refers to the number of coupled driving axles – in this case three. All these locomotives therefore carried numbers which started "C" followed by the individual identifier from C1 to C40.

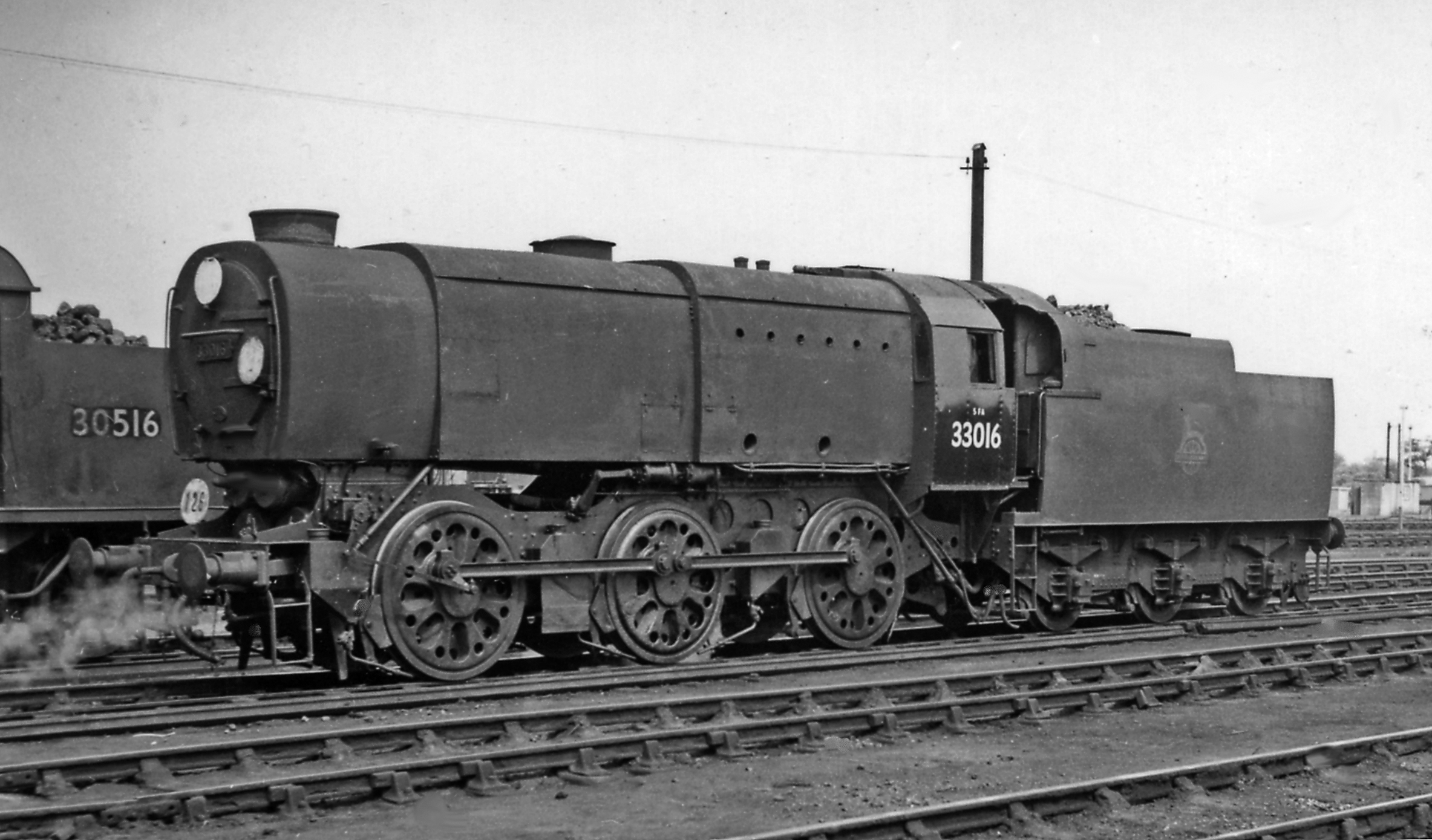
No. 33016 at Feltham Locomotive Depot 11 May 1959.

=== Post-1948 (nationalisation) ===
After nationalisation, the original Southern livery was in continued use, although with "British Railways" on the tender in Sunshine Yellow. From 1950 onwards, livery remained plain, although in the guise of British Railways Freight Black without lining of any description. The British Railways crest was located on the tender side. Given the British Railways power classification 5F, the locomotives were also renumbered to the British Railways' standard numbering system as 33001–33040.

== Preservation ==
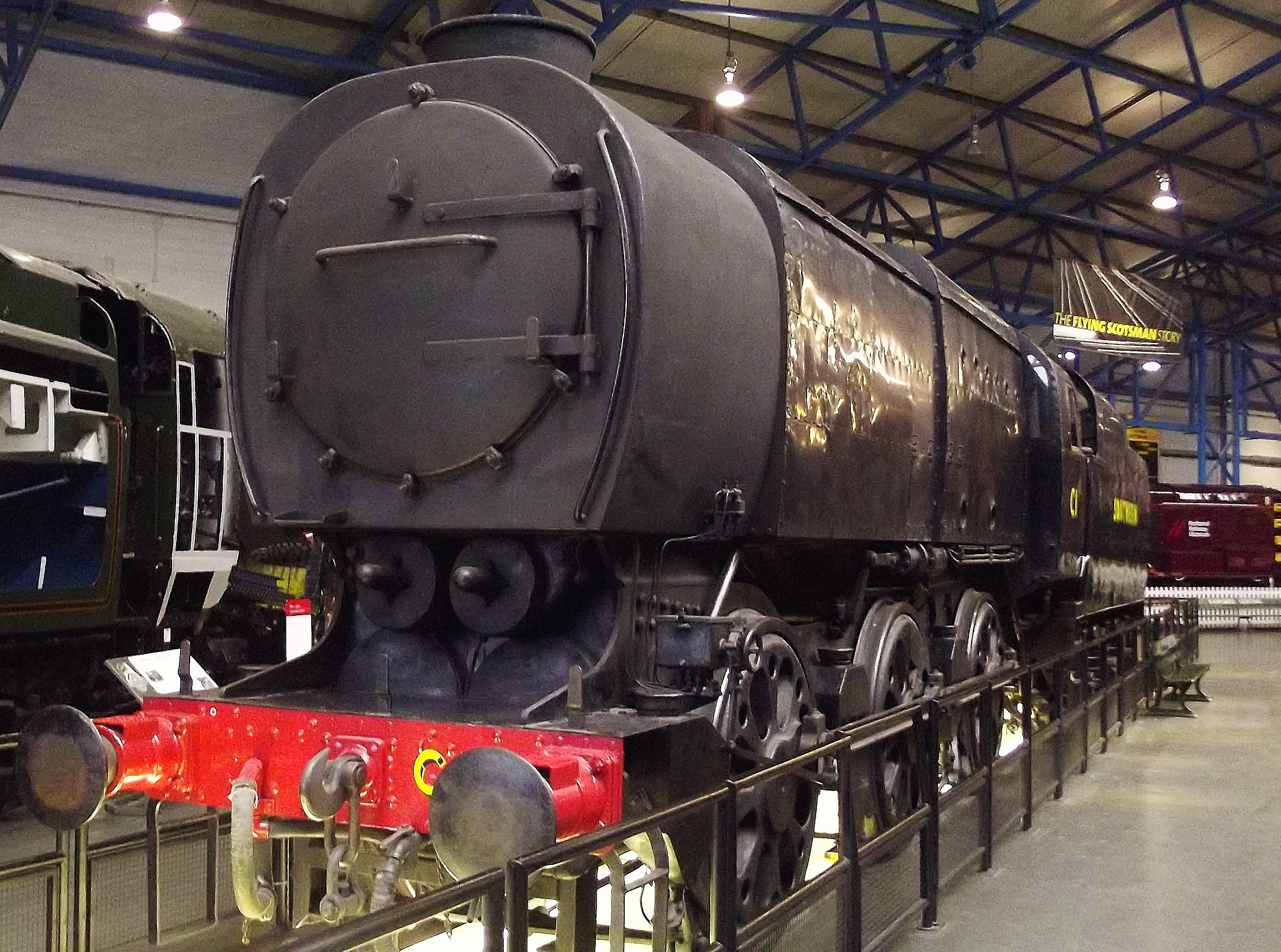
Southern C1 (8269510295)

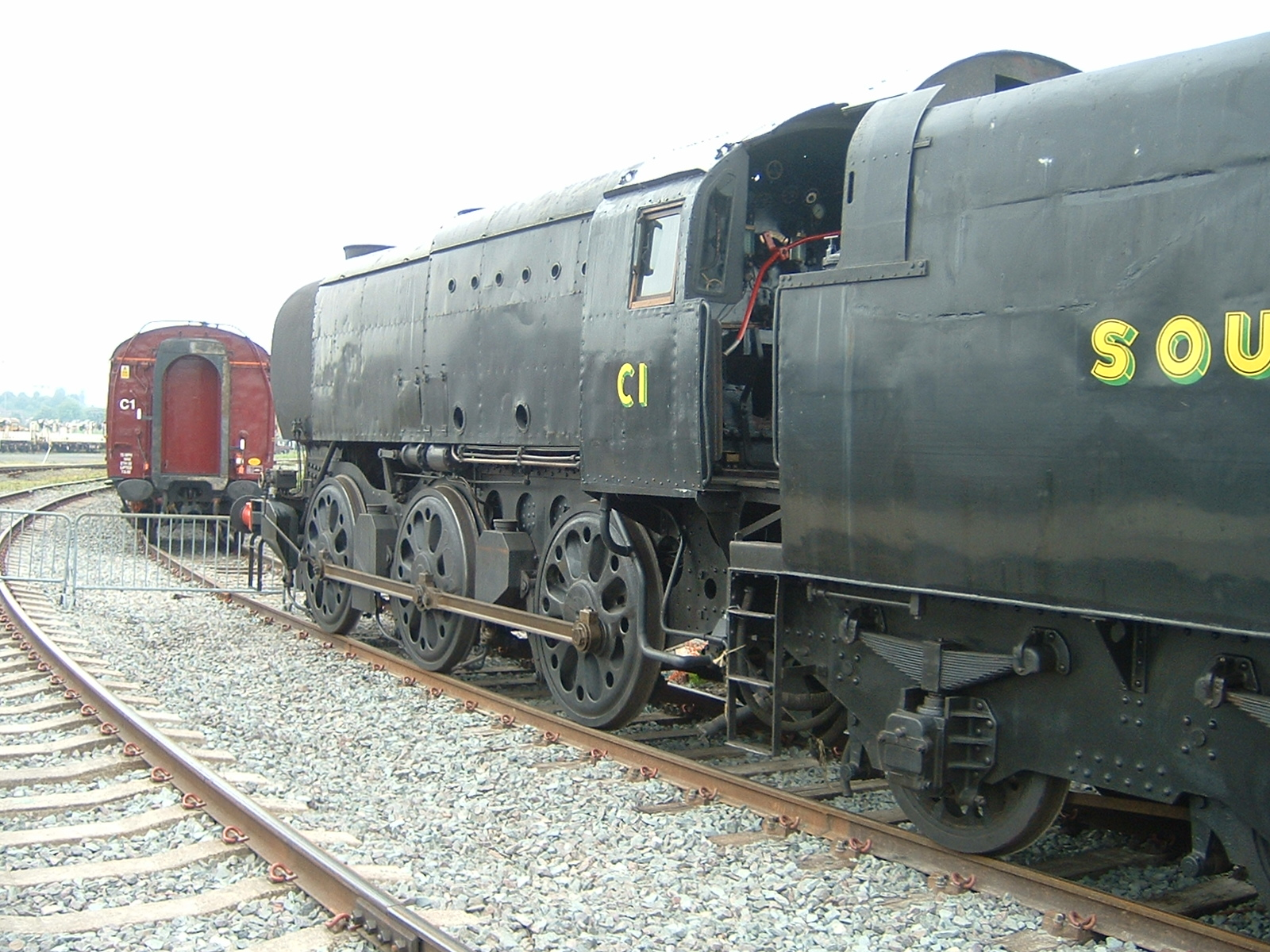
C1 at Railfest, York, 29 May 2004

Only one locomotive of the class survived into preservation. First-of-class 33001 (C1) has been preserved, and now resides at the National Railway Museum in York, where it carries its original SR livery and number. Before it moved to York in 2004, the locomotive worked on the Bluebell Railway in West Sussex: it ran from 14 September 1980 to Spring 1983. Its second period of running was from 9 September 1992 to Summer 2000 and that is the last time it ran.

== Model railways ==
In 2007, Dapol introduced several British N gauge models of the Q1 in BR black livery.
