= Nicholas Procter Burgh =

British marine engineer

Nicholas Procter Burgh (1834–1900) was a British marine engineer, known for his work on marine engines, marine engineering, screw propulsion, boilers and boiler-making, and the indicator diagram.

== Live and work ==
Born in Callington, Cornwall in 1834, Burgh married Elizabeth Parker Lewis from Gloucester in 1857 in Plymouth. They settled in Sheerness, where in 1859 Burgh obtained his first patent for an improvement of steam-engines. They further lived in Waterloo Road, London in the 1870s and in Croydon, a large town in South London, in the 1880s.

After working in industry for some years, Burgh started a practice as consulting marine engineer in 1859. He became a member of the Institution of Mechanical Engineers in 1870, and was elected the first president of the Institution of Marine Engineers. One of his apprentices was the mechanical engineer, inventor and general manager George Best Martin (1847–1901), and another pupil was William Wallington Harris (1841–1924).

Burgh published his first article in the London-based monthly magazine The Engineer in 1859 about his patented design for an improved steam engine. In the 1860s he further came into prominence, when he gave several lectures at the Royal Society of Arts in London and started publishing several books. More of those books were revised, enlarged and republished in the next decades. He kept writing articles for The Engineer on a regular base until the mid 1870s.

== Works ==
=== Burgh's steam engine, 1859 ===
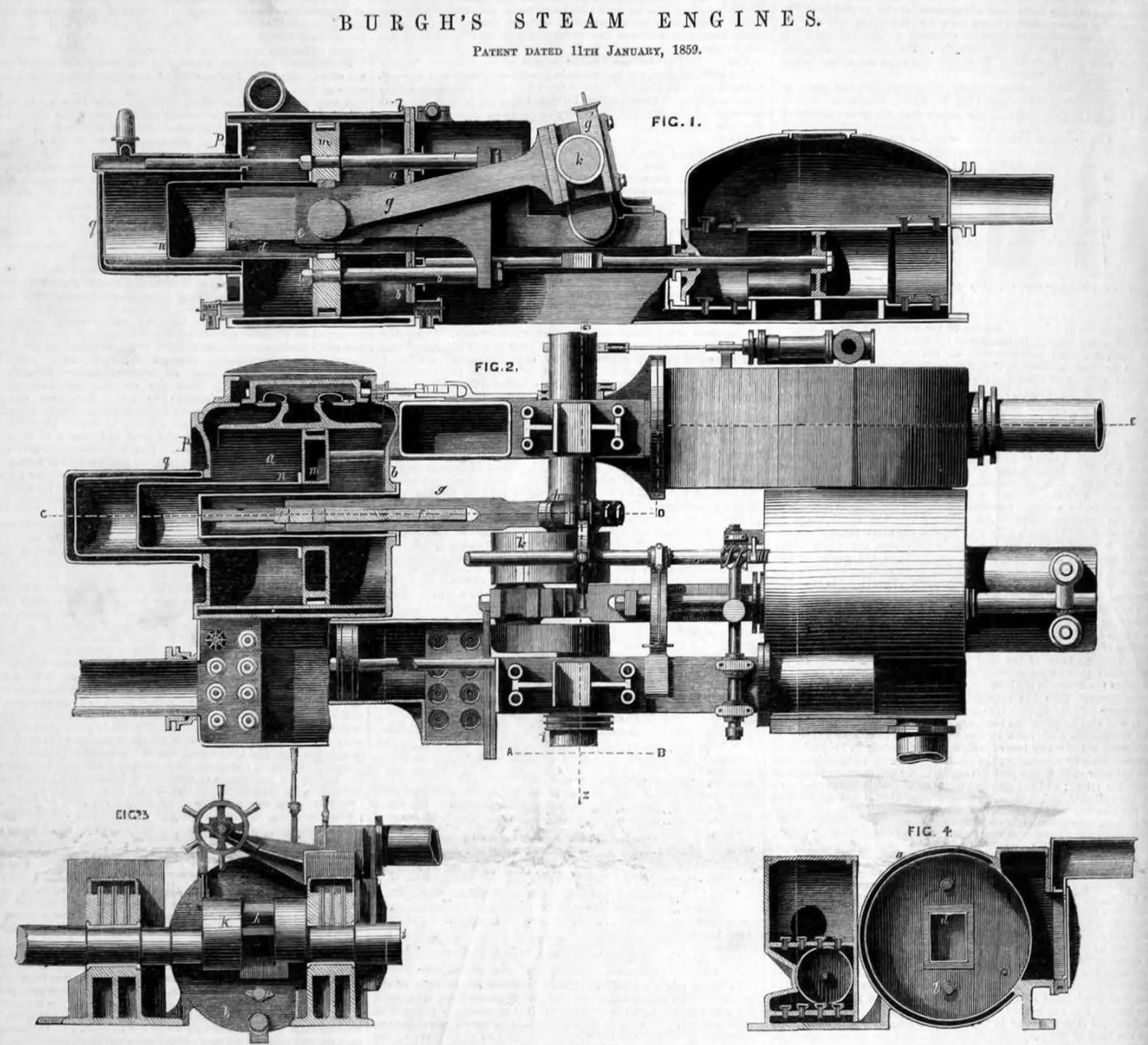
Burgh's steam engine, 1859

In an 1859 article in The Engineer Burgh pictured and described an improved arrangement for a marine steam engine, which he had patented early that year. The picture showed:

- the vertical sectional view of a marine engine (fig 1) being taken on the lines C, D, and B (of fig 2)
- the general plan view of a pair of such engines, the cylinder of the aft engine and the air-pump and valve arrangements of the first engine being shown in section
- the transverse sectional view (of Fig. 2) taken on the line G, H, showing the cylinder of one engine, And the air-pump and condenser of the other engine alongside of it, the connecting rods, guide piece, and block, being removed; and
- the two main bearings and their brasses being shown in section.

Burgh further explained that "in the illustrations a is the steam cylinder, b the for~end cover, which may be either cast as part of the cylinder or may be separate therefrom; c a trunk or tube securely attached to the fore-end cover of the cylinder, the fore cod of such trunk or tube being open, whilst the back or inner end is closed perfectly steam-tight... (etc.)"

=== A treatise on sugar machinery, 1863 ===
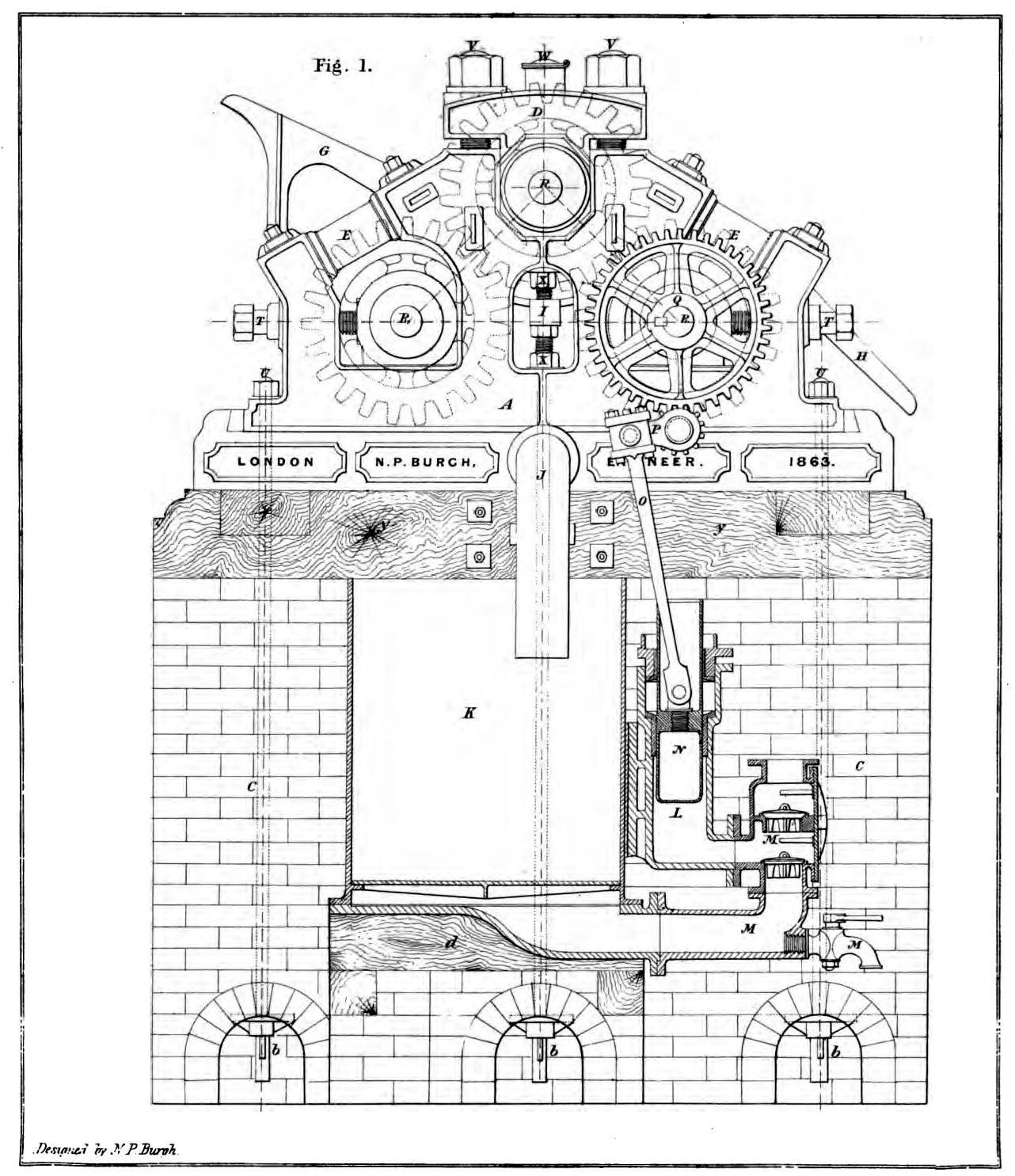
A treatise on sugar machinery, Plate 1, 1863

In the preface to "A treatise on sugar machinery" (1863) Burgh explained that the work was "intended for the use of Sugar Planters, Refiners, Engineers, etc. showing the present process of producing sugar from the cane, and of manufacturing and arranging the machinery. The designs and rules are given from practice, but at the same time, may be susceptible of improvement."

The book was divided into three parts, which Burgh described as follows:

ANALYSIS PROCESS : ... to enable correct calculations to be made, so as to determine the machinery, etc., requisite in proportion to the produce required...

MANUFACTURING MACHINERY: In this part of the work the author has endeavoured to show the mode of producing effective and durable machinery of the best kind he is at present conversant with.

ERECTING AND CONNECTING: ...the proper method of erecting and constructing the whole of the machinery used in the produce of sugar from the cane; but more particularly that of the sugar mill and vacuum pan, these two apparatus being the most essential.

=== Modern Marine Engineering, 1867 ===
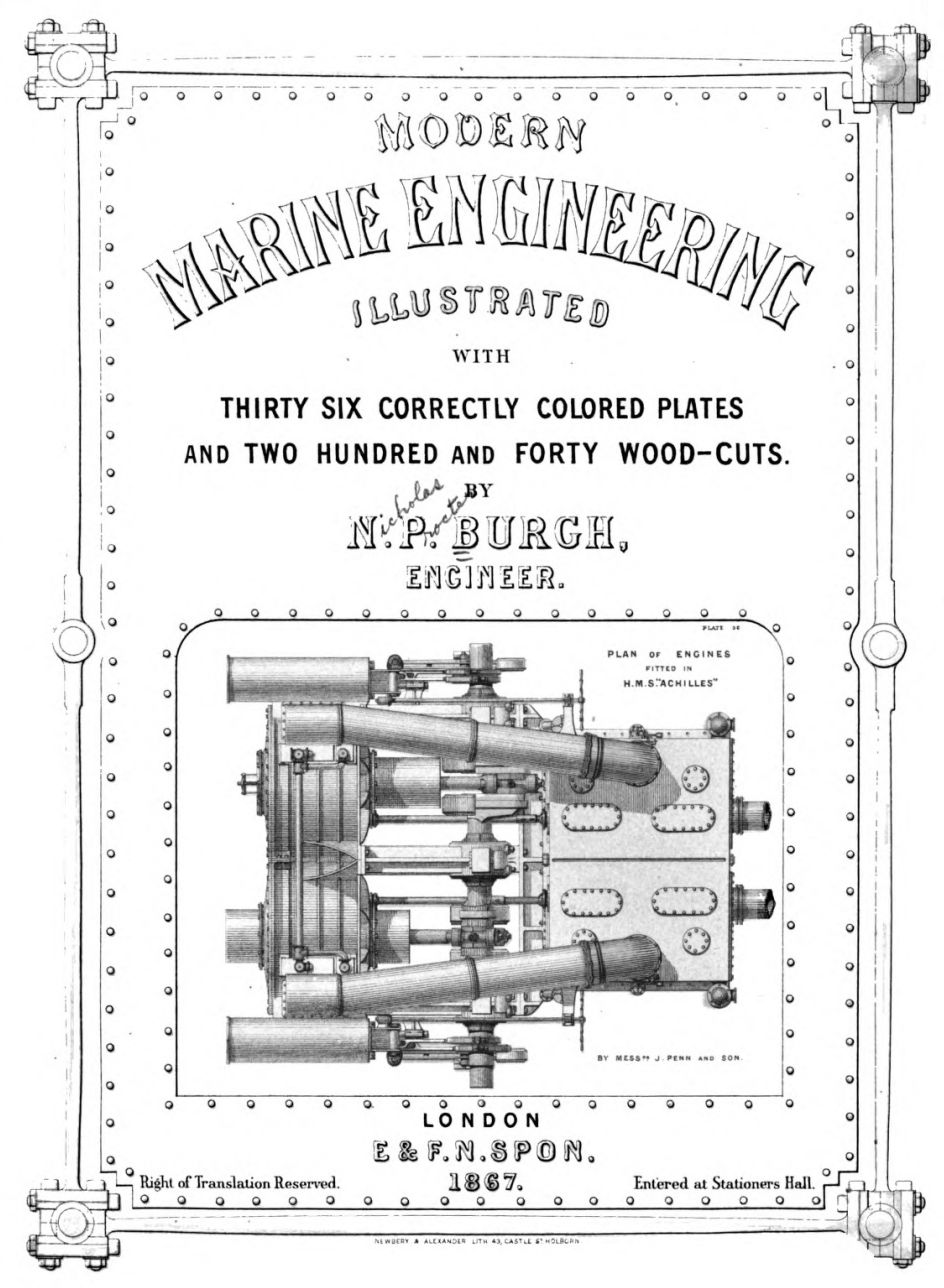
Modern Marine Engineering, title page, 1867

An 1867 review of this work in Scientific American gave the following introduction of this work

Although the marine steam engine, in general, is essentially the same today. as it was ten years ago, the details of it, and the practice of today compared with thc past are so changed for the better that the mechanical portion of the community are always ready and eager to obtain a knowledge of the construction at the present time.

English writers have, with a iew exceptions, supplied all the literature of the profession, and to them we look for the best works on the subject. John Bourne has rendered substantial service in this way, and there are no works on mechanical engineering more useful and reliable than his "Catechism," and later " Hand Book."

We have before us a new work on "Modern Marine Engineering," applied to paddle and screw steamers, by N. P. Burgh, engineer. The work is published in England, and issued in New York by D. Van Nostrand, No. 192 Broadway.

The review proceeds with a summary of the first chapter:

The first number contains drawings of a new set of engines recently built in England for a Russian frigate. These are made to scale, and accurately colored to represent the different metals employed. The colors are those generally used by the profession, not attempts at pictures. They give a clear idea of the plan and general arrangement. The style in which the work is got up challenges attention. The type is large and fine, the matter is double-leaded, and in point of mechanical execution faultless. The scope of the text is somewhat comprehensive; and in view of the interest always attaching to the subject, the reader scans every page attentively. Mr. Burgh goes into the subject quite prepared, indeed confident of his ability to cope with any question, and after discussing some of the types of engines in general use, he alludes to our forefathers as follows:
“To design engines-on land, and correctly manage, or rather attend to them at sea. would puzzle some of our forefathers, whose originations were nevertheless fair examples of that age of progression; what may seem perfection of arrangement, even after construction, on land, will often betray want of foresight as to access for repair or renewal at sea."

=== The Indicator Diagram Practically Considered, 1869 ===
One of the later books Burgh published was on the indicator diagram, since the early 20th century named pressure volume diagram or PV diagram. This was the first (and only) book solely devoted to the indicator diagram, its theoretical background, and its applications. This type of diagram was developed late 18th century in the workshop of Boulton and Watt by James Watt and his employee John Southern (1758–1815). It was used to improve the efficiency of engines, and kept a trade secret until the 1830s. In the 1850s William John Macquorn Rankine in 1859/1866 was one of the first to give a detailed description of the device. According to Miller (2011):

A detailed and influential treatment of the indicator within the framework of a newly developing 'engineering science' was given by W. J. Macquorn Rankine, in his A Manual of the Steam Engine (1859). Rankine not only reconceptualized the indicator diagram as what he called the 'diagram of energy', but also offered a substantial scientific account of how departures of real indicator diagrams from the ideal could be linked to operating characteristics of engines and of the indicator itself.

More works in those days described the diagram and its origin, such as in the 1865 Handbook of the steam-engine by the British engineer John Bourne. In the chapter on "The power and performance of engines" he introduced the device and made extensive use of indicator diagrams. In the first chapter of his 1869 work Burgh gave a general description of the state of the art on this subject in those days:

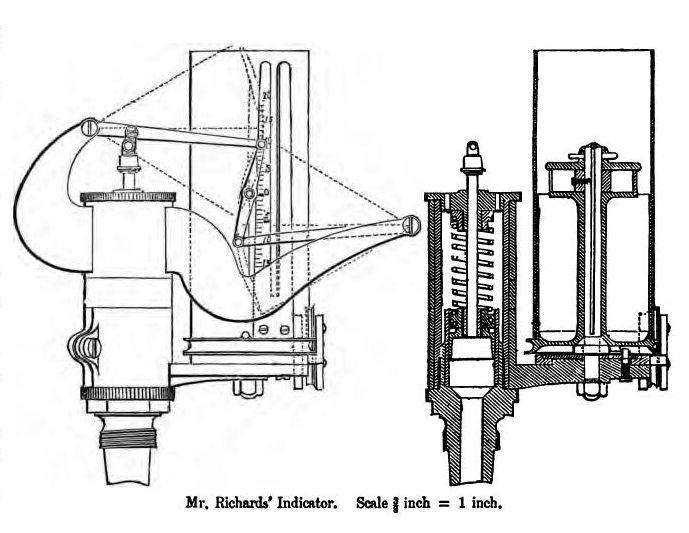
Mr Richards' Indicator, 1869.

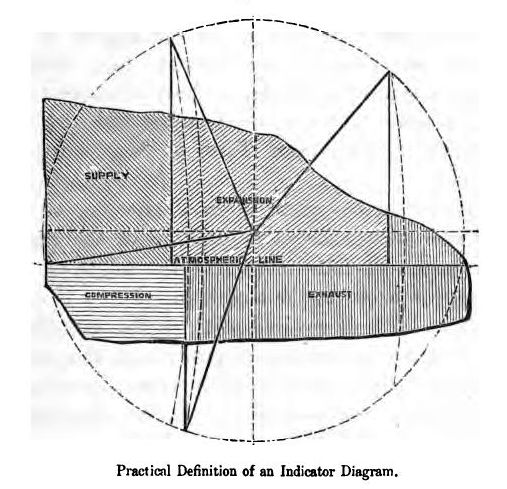
Practical definition of Indicator diagram, 1869.

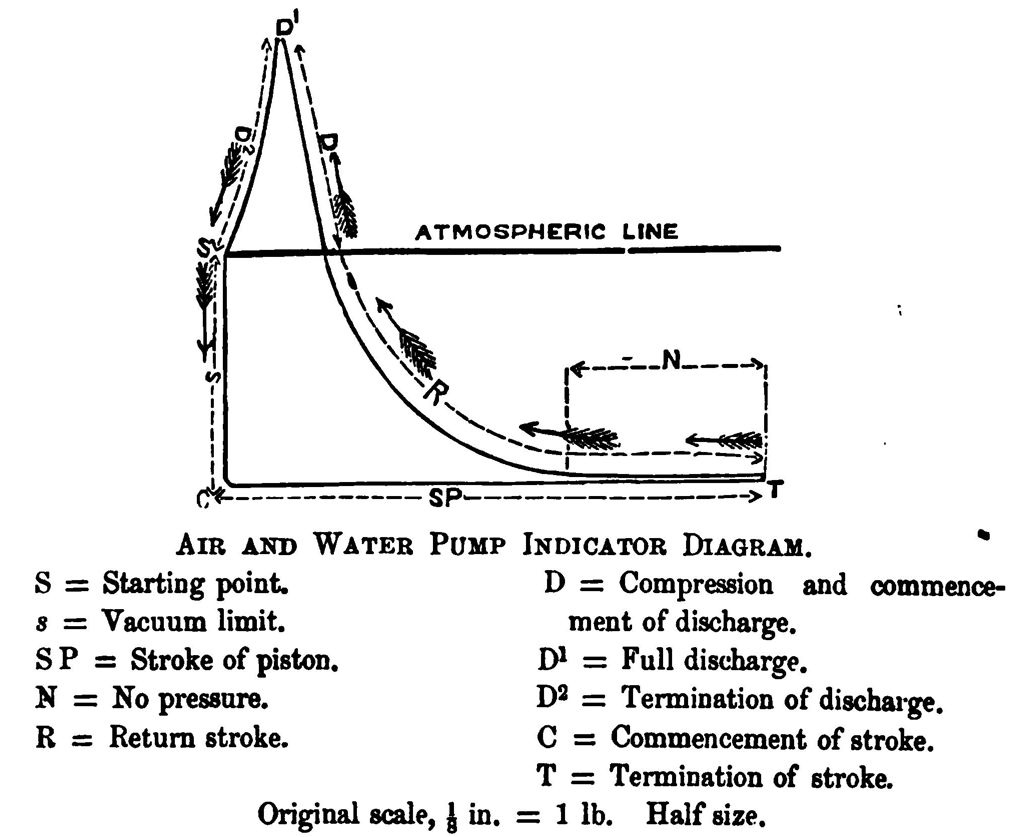
Air and Water Pump Indicator Diagram, 1869.

A VERY large proportion of the young members of the engineering profession look at an indicator diagram as a mysterious production; and even supposing that they comprehend how it is formed, they do not understand the causes for the various forms of figures. There is, therefore undoubtedly, room for a practical work on the subject which shall deal with the matter just as a learner requires : leading him on step by step without slipping, and impressing on his mind all the realities of the case... The best course of instruction for the young engineer then is, that the truth of each minute portion of the subject before him be laid bare, so that he can comprehend it. When he understands thus far, obviously his knowledge will enable him to put the same into practice boldly : for by being acquainted with the ground-work of the subject, he is master also to a great extent of the result of his labours.

In the preface Burgh explained, that the book describes all inns and outs of the PV diagram in the following ten steps:

- Chapter I. contains the description and use of the indicator, illustrating, at a working scale, Messrs. Maudslays' and Mr. Richards' Indicators (see image).
- Chapter II. is under the heading, "How to take an indicator diagram correctly:" which treats of the action of the steam in the cylinder; the definition of the diagram; correct indicator gear for horizontal, vertical, and oscillating engines, and indicating notes.
- Chapter III. deals with the proof of atmospheric pressure and particulars of steam pressures, and includes rules and tables bearing on the subject, with practical examples and illustrations.
- Chapter IV. is a complete description and illustration of the theoretical geometry of the indicator diagram in a more practical manner than hitherto published.
- Chapter V. is the practical geometry of the indicator diagram, which fully explains the frontispiece plate and other figures in connection with it.
- Chapter VI. commences the illustrations of indicator diagrams and gear constructed by the firms I have mentioned, and others whose names are noted under the figures : this chapter contains twenty-one diagrams from ordinary modern screw engines of all classes; three from compound engines; three of steam-launch engines; and two illustrations of indicator gear for return acting engines.
- Chapter VII. is devoted to diagrams taken from the most modem paddle-engines, and contains eighteen illustrations of them; also the most improved indicator gear by Messrs. Penn and Napier, for oscillating engines.
- Chapter VIII. treats of land-engine indicator diagrams, showing eleven examples taken from various classes, including locomotive engines.
- Chapter IX. fully explains and illustrates air and water pump diagrams.
- Chapter X. closes this work, with the explanation of the indicated horse-power in connection with the diagram.

This work was republished several times in Burgh's days. The fourth edition of this work was published in 1876, and the fifth edition in 1879.

== Reception ==
Burgh was well known, and many of his books were republished in his lifetime. His Pocket-Book of Practical Rules for the Proportions of Modern Engines and Boilers for Land and Marine purposes even ran until the 7th edition in the mid 1880s, and his Engineer. King's Notes on Steam, reached the nineteenth edition in 1882. In the 1860s his work became internationally known. In the United States the Scientific American journal published reviews of his work, and his work was published by David Van Nostrand's D. Van Nostrand Company in New York. In Germany the engineer Conrad Matschoss (1908) acknowledged that Burgh and John Bourne were the foremost authors on marine steam engines of the 1850s and 1860s.

After his death in the 20th century new developments in the field made Burgh's works obsolete, but references to his work recurred. One such reference from 1930s mentioned that:

... particulars and drawings of their boilers and engines are given in Modern Marine Engineering, by N. P. Burgh, published in 1872. The most original design was that of J. and G. Rennie, for whereas Penns and Maudslays both retained the locomotive boiler and non-condensing engines...

Again, a 1940 publication in the Combustion journal mentioned that:

Most interesting treatise on boilers, by N. P. Burgh, published in 1873, has just come to the attention of the Editor. Because of the many unique arrangements therein presented, it is believed that Combustion readers will find a description of some of these designs of particular interest in revealing the ingenuity and thinking of engineers of those days.

Later references to Burgh's work can be found. For example, in 1967 Adrian Arthur Bennett mentioned Burgh's books Rules for Designing, Constructing and Erecting Land and Marine Engines and Boilers," and Modern Screw Propulsion playing a role in the introduction of Western science and technology into China in the 19th century. In 1990 Stephen Hughes referred to Burgh's correspondence on the beam engine in The Archaeology of an Early Railway System. and Richard L. Hills mentioned his work in his History of the Stationary Steam Engine.

== Selected publications ==
- Nicholas Procter Burgh. A Treatise on Sugar Machinery: Including the Process of Producing Sugar from the Cane, Refining Moist and Loaf Sugar, Home and Colonial; the Practical Mode of Designing, Manufacturing, and Erecting the Machinery; Together with Rules for the Proportions and Estimates ... E. and F.N. Spon, 1863.
- Nicholas Procter Burgh. Practical rules for the proportions of modern engines and boilers for land and marine purposes. H.C. Baird, 1865.
- Nicholas Procter Burgh. Modern Marine Engineering: Illustrated with Thirty-six Correctly Colored Plates and Two Hundred and Forty Wood-cuts. E. & F.N. Spon, 1866, 1867
- Nicholas Procter Burgh. A practical treatise on modern screw-propulsion: Illustrated with fifty-two plates, and one hundred and three woodcuts. E. and F.N. Spon, 1869
- Nicholas Procter Burgh. The Indicator Diagram Practically Considered. E. & F. N. Spon, 1869.
- Burgh, Nicholas Procter. A practical treatise on boilers and boiler-making. Vol. 2. E. & FN Spon, 1873.
