= List of Lord Nelson class locomotives =

Below is a list of SR Lord Nelson class locomotives. They were named after famous admirals, in recognition of the fact that the Southern Railway served the Royal Navy bases at Portsmouth and Plymouth.

SR No.	BR No.	Namesake	Builder	Built	Withdrawn	Notes	Image
850	30850	Lord Nelson	Eastleigh Works	August 1926	August 1962	Preserved by the National Railway Museum. Currently stored on the Mid Hants Railway due to expiration of boiler ticket in 2015.	
851	30851	Sir Francis Drake	Eastleigh Works	May 1928	December 1961		
852	30852	Sir Walter Raleigh	Eastleigh Works	July 1928	February 1962		
853	30853	Sir Richard Grenville	Eastleigh Works	September 1928	March 1962		
854	30854	Howard of Effingham	Eastleigh Works	October 1928	September 1961		
855	30855	Robert Blake	Eastleigh Works	October 1928	October 1961		
856	30856	Lord St Vincent	Eastleigh Works	November 1928	September 1962		
857	30857	Lord Howe	Eastleigh Works	December 1928	September 1962		
858	30858	Lord Duncan	Eastleigh Works	January 1929	August 1961	First one withdrawn from service.	
859	30859	Lord Hood	Eastleigh Works	March 1929	December 1961		
860	30860	Lord Hawke	Eastleigh Works	December 1929	August 1962		
861	30861	Lord Anson	Eastleigh Works	September 1929	October 1962		
862	30862	Lord Collingwood	Eastleigh Works	October 1929	October 1962	Last one withdrawn from service.	
863	30863	Lord Rodney	Eastleigh Works	October 1929	February 1962		
864	30864	Sir Martin Frobisher	Eastleigh Works	November 1929	January 1962		
865	30865	Sir John Hawkins	Eastleigh Works	November 1929	May 1962		
