= SR Lord Nelson class =

Class of 16 four-cylinder 4-6-0 locomotives

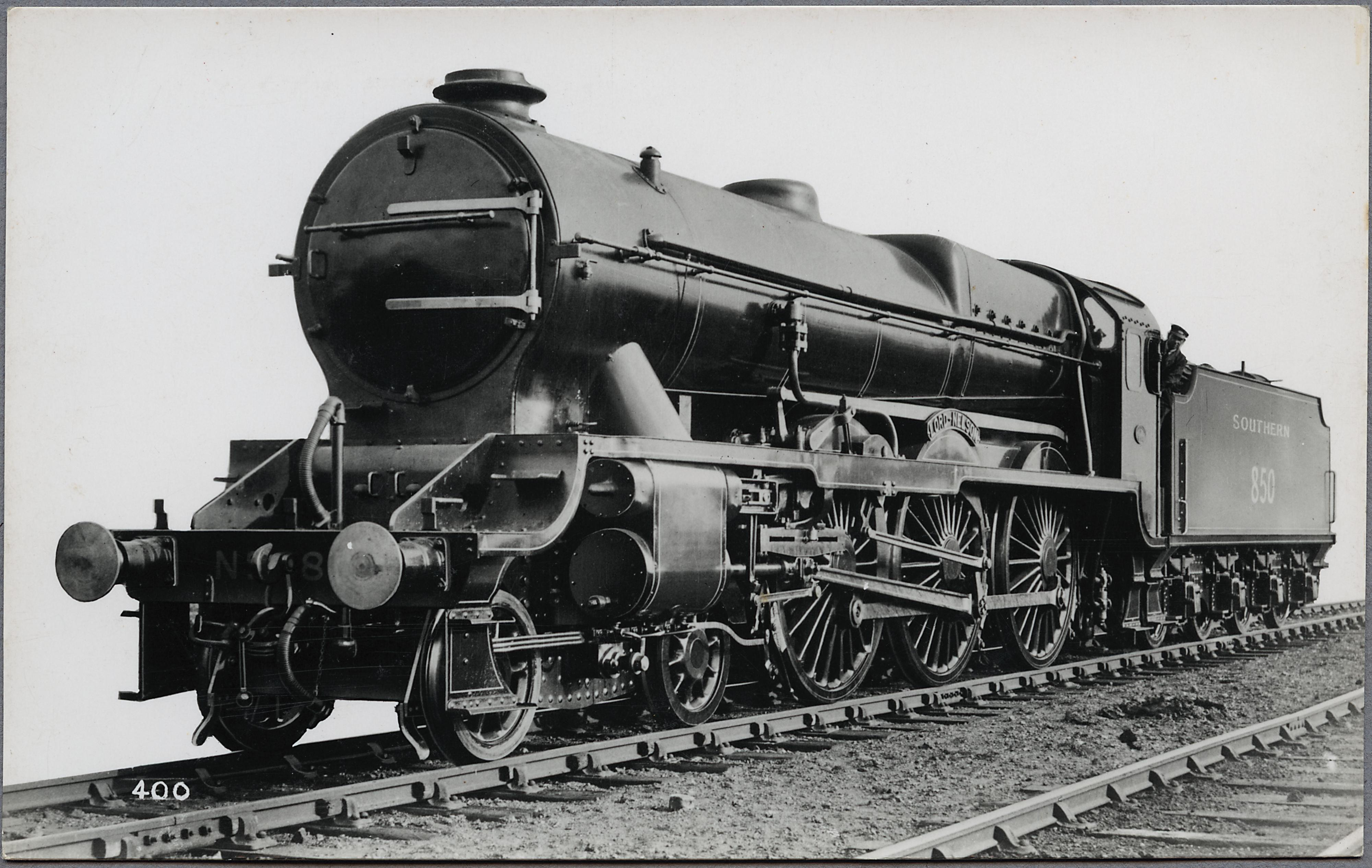
- 850 "Lord Nelson"
Type and origin
- Power type: Steam
- Designer: Richard Maunsell
- Builder: SR Eastleigh Works
- Build date: 1926–1929
- Total produced: 16
Specifications
- Configuration
  - Whyte: 4-6-0
  - UIC: 2′C h4
- Gauge: 4 ft 8 1/2 in (1,435 mm) standard gauge
- Leading dia.: 3 ft 1 in (0.940 m)
- Driver dia.: 6 ft 7 in (2.007 m); 6 ft 3 in (1.905 m) (one-off modification on E859)
- Length: 69 ft 9 3/4 in (21.3 m)
- Loco weight: 83 long tons 10 cwt (187,000 lb or 84.8 t)
- Tender weight: 57 long tons 19 cwt (129,800 lb or 58.9 t)
- Fuel type: Coal
- Fuel capacity: 5 long tons 0 cwt (11,200 lb or 5.1 t) (5.6 short tons)
- Water cap.: 5,000 imp gal (23,000 L; 6,000 US gal)
- Firebox
  - Grate area: 33 ft^{2} (3.1 m^{2})
- Boiler pressure: 220 lbf/in^{2} (1.52 MPa)
- Cylinders: Four
- Cylinder size: 16 1/2 in × 26 in (419 mm × 660 mm)
Performance figures
- Tractive effort: 33,510 lbf (149.06 kN); 35,298 lbf (157.01 kN) (E859 w/6 ft 3 in. driving wheels)
Career
- Operators: Southern Railway; → British Railways
- Power class: BR: 7P
- Numbers: SR:850-865, BR:30850-30865
- Locale: Great Britain
- Withdrawn: 1961–1962
- Preserved: 850 Lord Nelson
- Disposition: One preserved, remainder scrapped

The Southern Railway class LN or Lord Nelson class is a type of 4-cylinder 4-6-0 steam locomotive designed for the Southern Railway by Richard Maunsell in 1926. They were intended for Continental boat trains between London (Victoria) and Dover harbour, but were also later used for express passenger work to South-West England. Sixteen of them were constructed, representing the most powerful (although not the most successful) Southern 4-6-0 design. They were all named after famous admirals.

The class continued to operate with British Railways until withdrawn during 1961 and 1962. Only one example of the class – the first engine, Lord Nelson itself – has been saved from scrapping. This has been seen running on mainline tours and preserved railways throughout Britain.

== Background ==
Although the improved ”King Arthur" class 4-6-0 locomotives were capable of the heaviest express passenger work between London and South West England, there was a growth in demand for Continental traffic travelling via Dover and Folkestone. By the mid-1920s the Southern Railway Traffic Department wished to begin operating 500-long-ton (510 t; 560-short-ton) express trains on these routes during peak periods. These would require a more powerful locomotive, able to pull heavier loads at sustained speeds of 55 mph (89 km/h), so as not to impede the congested electrified lines around London. However, any enlargement of the existing 2-cylinder design was not possible due to weight restrictions imposed by the railway's Civil Engineer.

After examining the practice of other British railways, Richard Maunsell, the Chief Mechanical Engineer, secured agreement for a 4-cylinder design, with an improved boiler and Belpaire firebox. The drive would be divided between the front coupled axle for the inside cylinders and the middle coupled axle for the outside cylinders giving better weight distribution and reduced hammer blow. The new design was an inevitable compromise between the need for additional power and to keep the weight down to an acceptable limit.

There were two unusual features of the design: the first of which was the setting of the crank axles at 135°, rather than the standard 90° of other locomotive types. This design necessitated four sets of valve gear, and gave rise to eight beats per revolution, rather than the usual four, designed to give a more even draw on the fire and less chance of wheelslip when starting. The second difference was that fire grate was in two sections, the rear portion was horizontal and the front sloped away sharply.

== Construction history ==
The prototype E850 named Lord Nelson was ordered from Eastleigh railway works in June 1925 but production proceeded slowly, at Maunsell's insistence, to ensure that the weight was kept to a minimum at every stage, so the locomotive did not appear until August 1926. It was tested on a variety of duties over the next year, with sufficiently encouraging results for an initial order for ten more locomotives for delivery between May 1928 and April 1929 to be placed. These were originally scheduled to be allocated to Battersea depot and fitted with 4,000 gallon 6-wheeled tenders suitable for the Continental ports. However, during construction, it was decided to equip half of the class with 5,000 gallon 8-wheeled tenders necessary for the longer West of England routes and to allocate them to Nine Elms depot. A further batch of ten locomotives was ordered in 1928, before the previous batch had been delivered, but when it became apparent that the Stock Market crash of 1929 would be likely to reduce the demand for Continental travel, this second order was reduced to five.

=== Naming the locomotives ===
The locomotives were all named after famous Royal Navy admirals, with the first of the class being named Lord Nelson. As a result, the rest of the locomotives belonged to the Lord Nelson (LN) class.

=== Modifications ===
The performance of the new locomotives was mixed, depending upon the experience of the crew and the circumstances under which they were operating. At times it was no better than their smaller predecessors. Maunsell therefore undertook a number of experiments to try to improve the performance of the new locomotives. No. E859 was fitted with smaller 6 ft 3 in (1.905 m) driving wheels to see if this would improve performance over the heavily graded London-Dover line, but the difference was marginal. No. E860 was fitted with a longer, heavier boiler but once again with little improvement. The whole class however benefitted from the fitting of smoke deflectors during the late 1920s.

Maunsell was aware of the reputation for poor steaming enjoyed by the class and attempted to address it by the fitting of twin Kylchap blastpipes to No. 860 in 1934. However, the problem was ultimately solved by Oliver Bulleid, Maunsell's replacement as Chief Mechanical Engineer of the Southern in 1938. He fitted larger diameter chimneys and Lemaître multiple jet blastpipes, which effectively transformed their performance. Thereafter the class was highly respected.

== Operational details ==
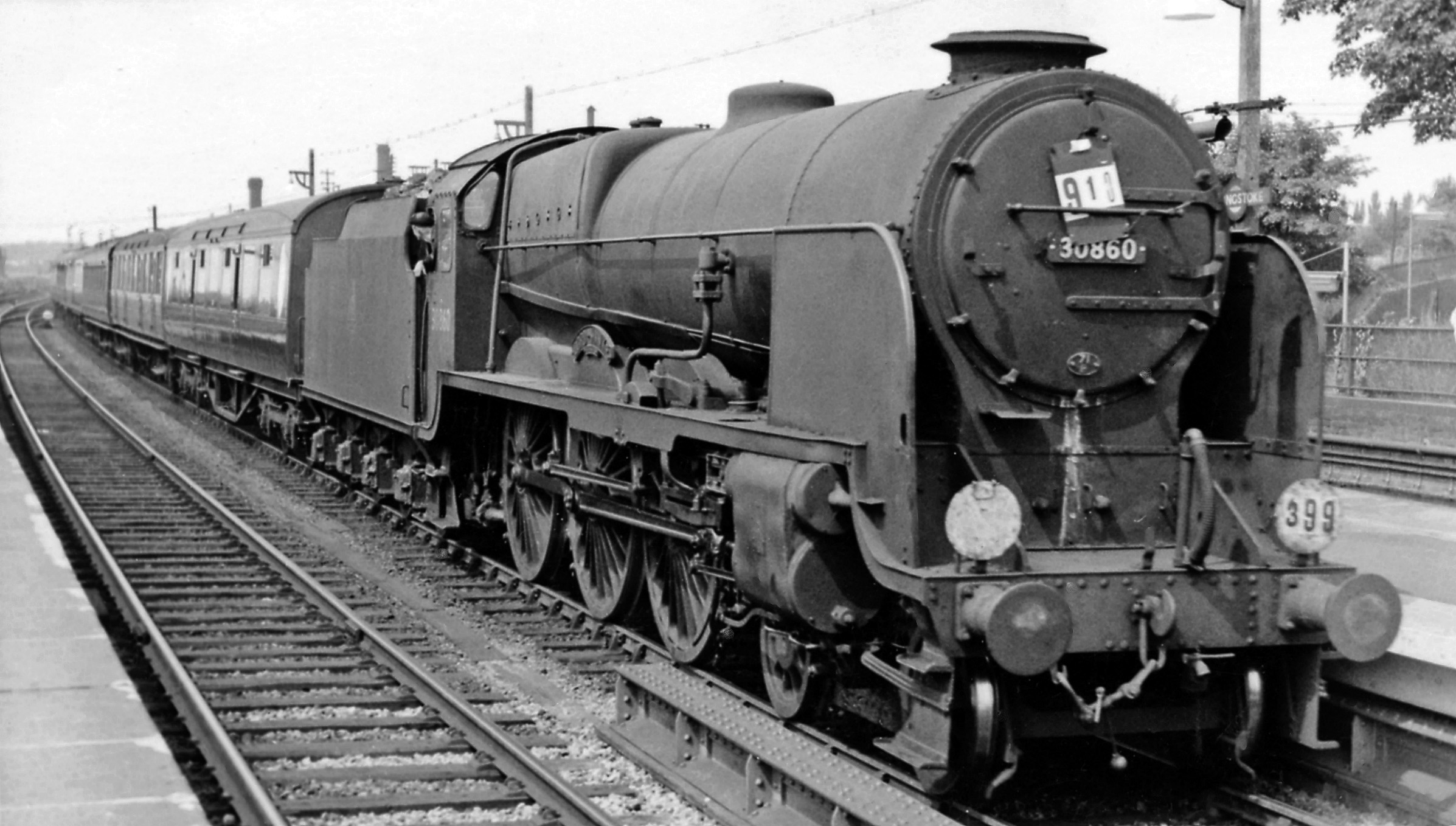
30860 Lord Hawke at Basingstoke in 1959.

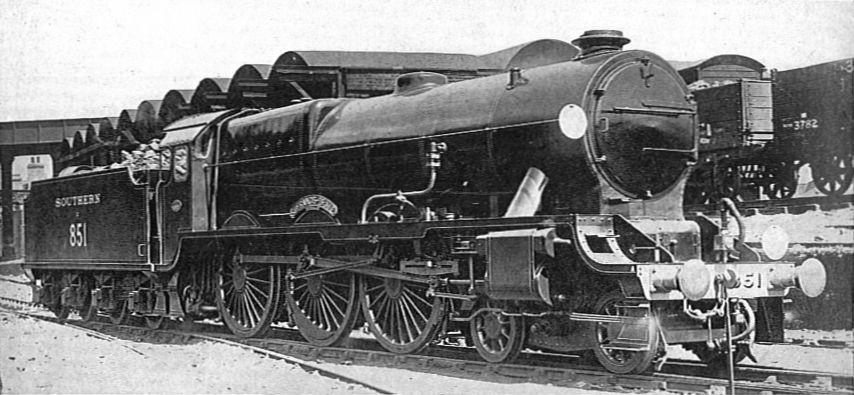
851 Sir Francis Drake

For a period after its introduction to the Southern Railway network, the Lord Nelson class held the title of "most powerful locomotive in Britain" – a claim based on its tractive effort. The advanced design of the locomotive led to the GWR introducing the GWR 6000 Class in order to regain the title lost by their GWR 4073 Class locomotives when the Lord Nelsons were constructed. The planned 500-ton trains never materialised, but the class was regularly used on 460 ton trains such as the Golden Arrow. After the Second World War they were also frequently used on heavily laden Boat Trains between London Waterloo station and Southampton docks.

The Lord Nelsons were notoriously difficult for inexperienced crews to fire properly, due to their long firebox, and specific crews who had proven experience in firing the locomotives were therefore allocated to them. This was due to the relatively few locomotives in the class for crews to train on. The LMS Royal Scot Class was loosely based on this design.

== Accidents and incidents ==
- One member of the Lord Nelson class was involved in what could have been a major accident on 23 January 1930. This entailed the leading driving wheels jumping off the track, though the locomotive ran for many yards before they re-railed themselves over a set of points.
- No. 860 Lord Hawke was derailed at St. Denys, Hampshire on 14 August 1940 due to enemy action. A bomb fell on the track ahead of the train, which was unable to stop in time.
- No. 852 Sir Walter Raleigh received a direct hit from an enemy bomb on 18 April 1941, and was so severely damaged that it was not returned to service until June 1942.
- No. 854 Howard of Effingham suffered a firebox failure due to lack of water on 23 April 1945, killing the fireman and injuring the driver.
- No. 851 Sir Francis Drake was involved in a serious derailment at Byfleet on 27 December 1946, due to the poor condition of the permanent way.
- On 26 November 1947, No. 860 Lord Hawke was hauling a passenger train that was run into by another at Farnborough, Hampshire, due to a signalman's error. Two people were killed.
- No. 30854 Howard of Effingham was hauling a passenger train that overran signals and was derailed by trap points at Shawford, Hampshire, on 20 July 1952.

== Withdrawal ==
The class was gradually superseded on top link expresses during the 1940s by growing numbers of Bulleid Pacifics, although throughout the 1950s they were frequently called upon during peak periods or to deputise for failures. The rebuilding of the Pacifics in the late 1950s and their subsequent increased reliability rendered the Lord Nelson surplus to operational requirements, and they were gradually phased out of service. The entire class was withdrawn during 1961 and 1962.

== Livery and numbering ==
=== Southern Railway ===
The Lord Nelson class was initially painted in Maunsell lined olive green, which later changed to a lighter shade in the mid-1930s. From 1938, some of the locomotives were painted in a semi-matt Malachite Green finish when Bulleid replaced Maunsell as CME of the Southern. During the war years, the locomotives were painted in wartime black livery, though retained the word "Southern" in yellow on the tender. After the war, the livery was reverted to the Southern Railway Malachite Green standard with "Sunshine Yellow" lining on the boiler rings.

Numbers allocated to the locomotives were a variation of LSWR practice and, being constructed at Eastleigh, were given the prefix "E" before the number to distinguish from the locomotives of other pre-grouping railway companies that also carried the same number. In the case of the Lord Nelson class the numbering ranged from E850 to E865. This was eventually superseded by numbers without the "E" prefix, becoming 850 to 865 from 1931.

=== Post-1948 (nationalisation) ===
The initial livery applied following the nationalisation of the railways in 1948 was modified Southern malachite green and sunshine yellow with "British Railways" on the tender, and the Southern numbering system was temporarily retained with an "S" prefix (such as S850) until superseded by the British Railways numbering system. The locomotives then carried British Railways Brunswick green livery with orange and black lining. By this stage the locomotives were renumbered under standard British Railways procedure, from 30850 to 30865.

== Preservation ==
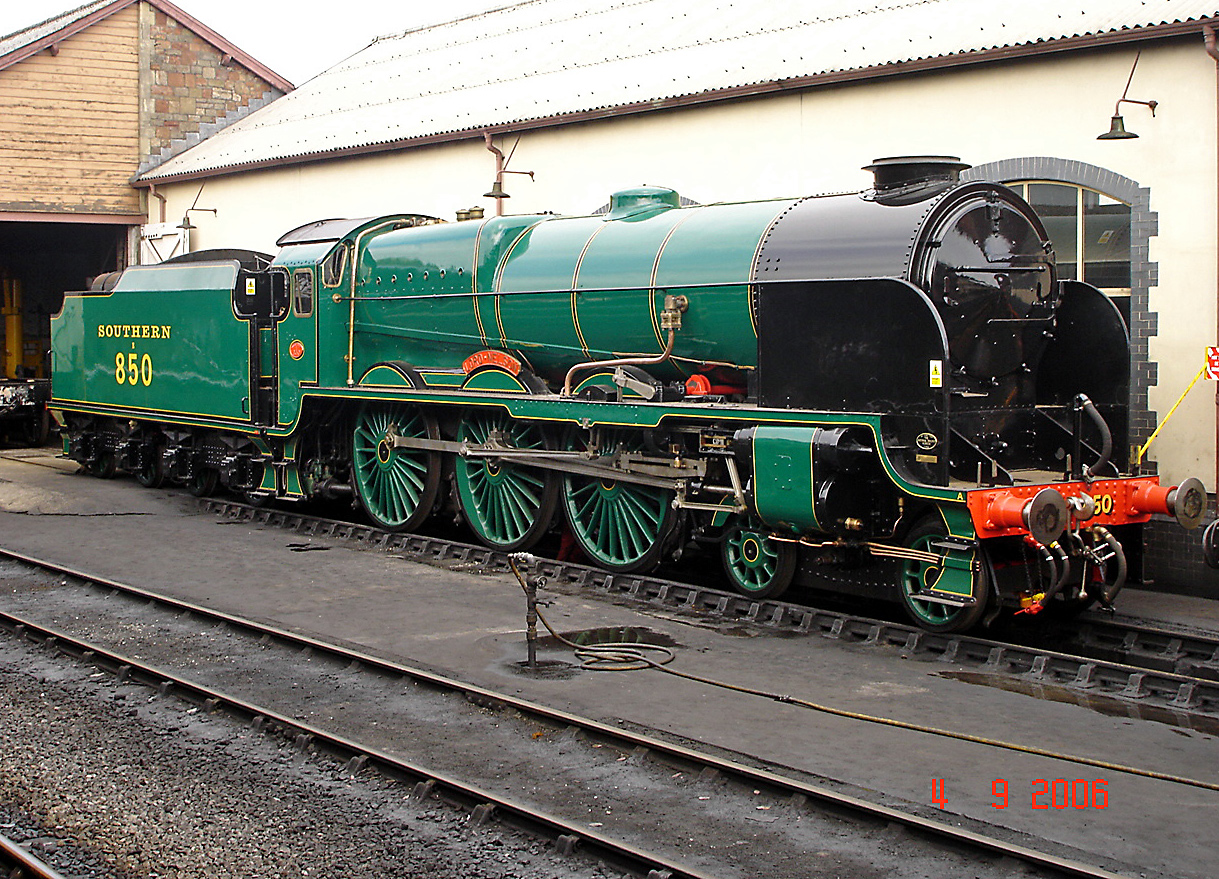
850 Lord Nelson at Minehead, WSR in 2006

The first engine built, (30)850 Lord Nelson, has been preserved as part of the National Railway Collection and has run on the national rail network. As of 2020 it is based on the Mid-Hants Railway. Its boiler certificate expired in 2015. It is now stored awaiting overhaul.

== See also ==
- List of Lord Nelson class locomotives
