= Indicator diagram =

Used to estimate the performance of reciprocating engine

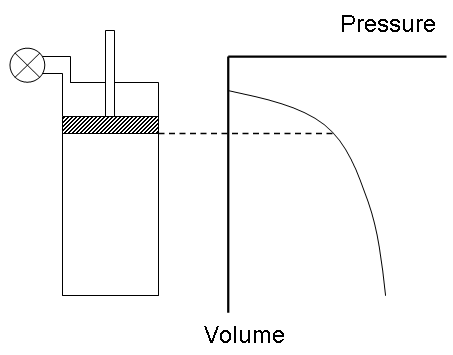
Watt's indicator diagram

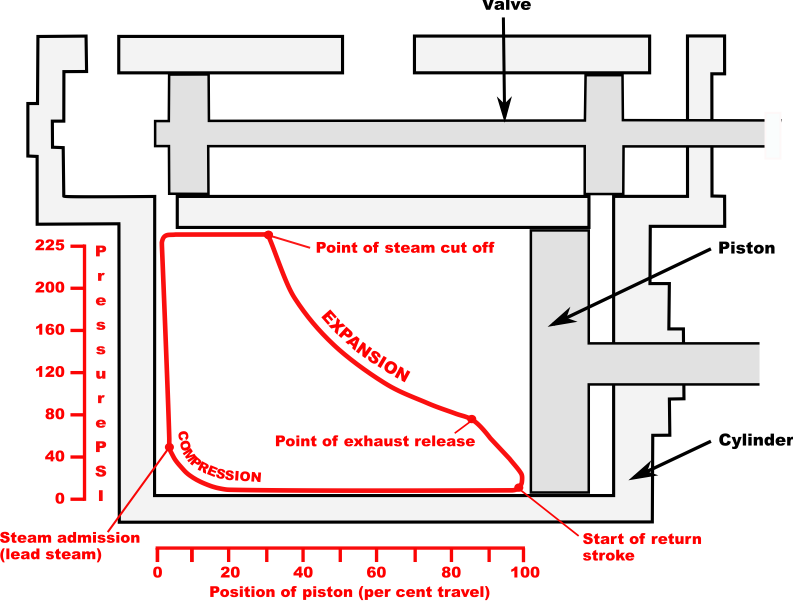
Indicator diagram for steam locomotive

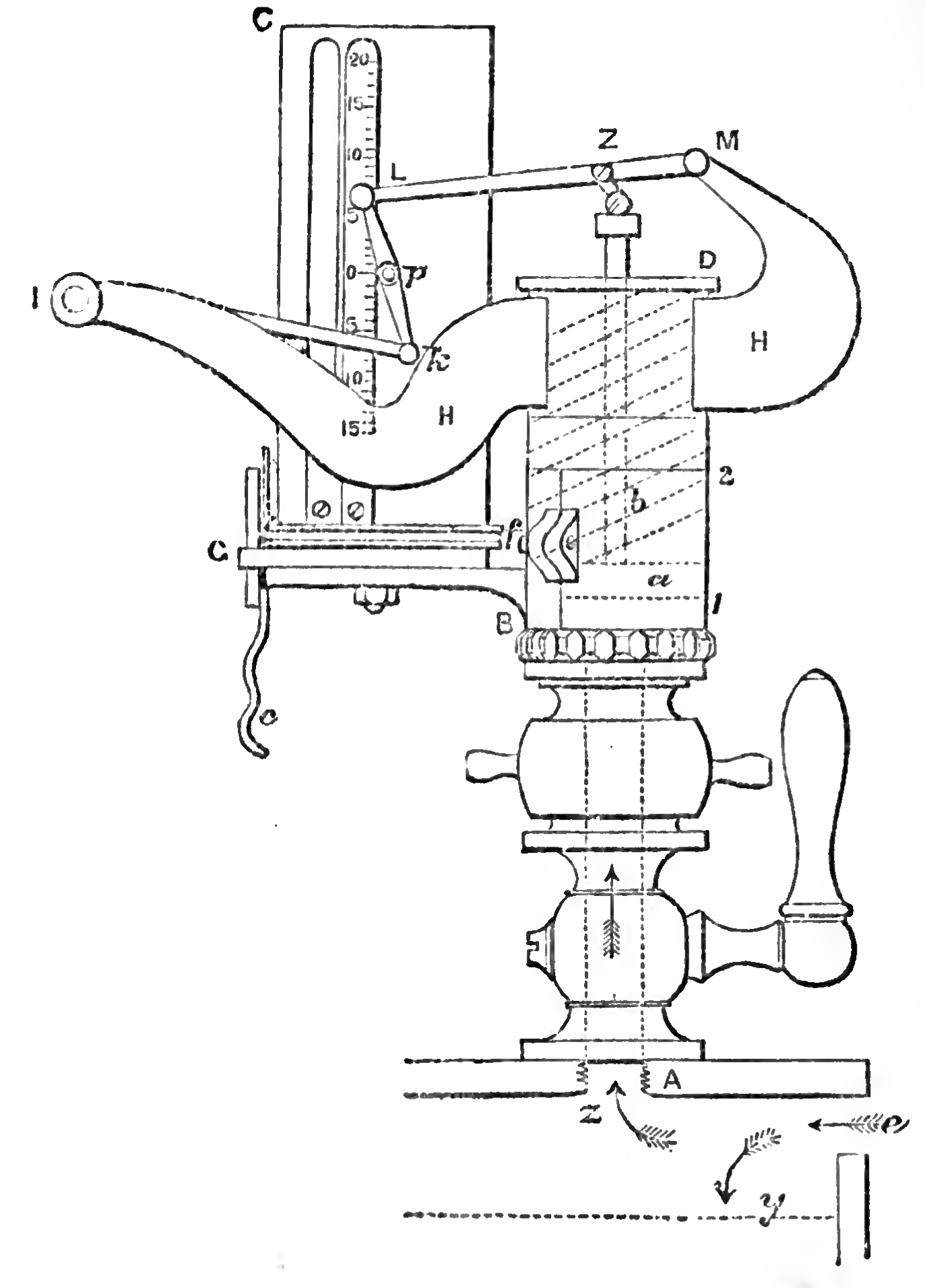
Richard's indicator instrument of 1875

An indicator diagram is a chart used to measure the thermal, or cylinder, performance of reciprocating steam and internal combustion engines and compressors. An indicator chart records the pressure in the cylinder versus the volume swept by the piston, throughout the two or four strokes of the piston which constitute the engine, or compressor, cycle. The indicator diagram is used to calculate the work done and the power produced in an engine cylinder or used in a compressor cylinder.

== History ==
The indicator diagram was developed by James Watt and his employee John Southern to help understand how to improve the efficiency of steam engines. In 1796, Southern developed the simple, but critical, technique to generate the diagram by fixing a board so as to move with the piston, thereby tracing the "volume" axis, while a pencil, attached to a pressure gauge, moved at right angles to the piston, tracing "pressure".

The indicator diagram constitutes one of the earliest examples of statistical graphics. It may be significant that Watt and Southern developed the indicator diagram at roughly the same time that William Playfair (a former Boulton & Watt employee who continued an amicable correspondence with Watt) published The Commercial and Political Atlas, a book often cited as the first to employ statistical graphics.

The gauge enabled Watt to calculate the work done by the steam while ensuring that its pressure had dropped to zero by the end of the stroke, thereby ensuring that all useful energy had been extracted. The total work could be calculated from the area between the "volume" axis and the traced line. The latter fact had been realised by Davies Gilbert as early as 1792 and used by Jonathan Hornblower in litigation against Watt over patents on various designs. Daniel Bernoulli had also had the insight about how to calculate work.

Watt used the diagram to make radical improvements to steam engine performance and long kept it a trade secret. Though it was made public in a letter to the Quarterly Journal of Science in 1822, it remained somewhat obscure, John Farey, Jr. only learned of it on seeing it used, probably by Watt's men, when he visited Russia in 1826.

In 1834, Émile Clapeyron used a diagram of pressure against volume to illustrate and elucidate the Carnot cycle, elevating it to a central position in the study of thermodynamics.

Later instruments for steam engine (illus.) used paper wrapped around a cylindrical barrel with a pressure piston inside it, the rotation of the barrel coupled to the piston crosshead by a weight- or spring-tensioned wire.

In 1869 the British marine engineer Nicholas Procter Burgh wrote a full book on the indicator diagram explaining the device step by step. He had noticed that "a very large proportion of the young members of the engineering profession look at an indicator diagram as a mysterious production."

Indicators developed for steam engines were improved for internal combustion engines with their rapid changes in pressure, resulting from combustion, and higher speeds. In addition to using indicator diagrams for calculating power they are used to understand the ignition, injection timing and combustion events which occur near dead-center, when the engine piston and indicator drum are hardly moving. Much better information during this part of the cycle is obtained by offsetting the indicator motion by 90 degrees to the engine crank, giving an offset indicator diagram. The events are recorded when the velocity of the drum is near its maximum and are shown against crank-angle instead of stroke.

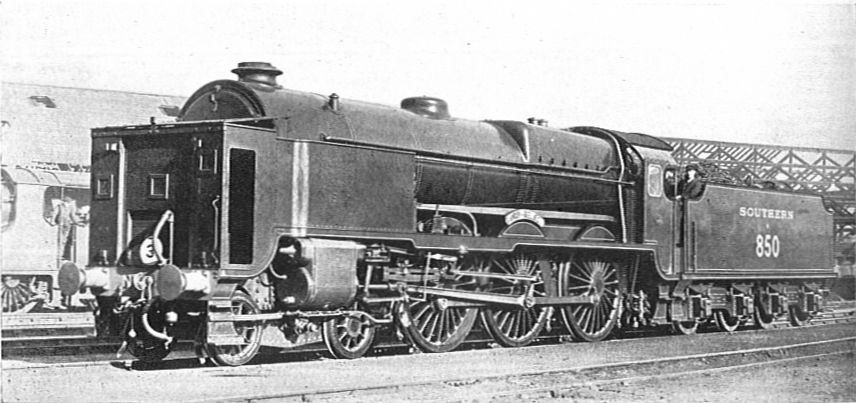
E850 Lord Nelson, with an indicator shelter, c. 1926–1927

== See also ==
- Pressure–volume diagram
- Temperature–entropy diagram
- Thermodynamic cycle

== Bibliography ==
- Cardwell, D.S.L. (1971). From Watt to Clausius: The Rise of Thermodynamics in the Early Industrial Age. Heinemann: London. pp. 79–81. ISBN 0-435-54150-1.
- Pacey, A.J. & Fisher, S.J. (1967) "Daniel Bernoulli and the vis viva of compressed air", The British Journal for the History of Science 3 (4), pp. 388–392, doi:10.1017/S0007087400002934
- British Transport Commission (1957) Handbook for Railway Steam Locomotive Enginemen, London : B.T.C., p. 81, (facsimile copy publ. Ian Allan (1977), ISBN 0-7110-0628-8)
