= SR Q class =

Class of 20 two-cylinder 0-6-0 steam locomotives

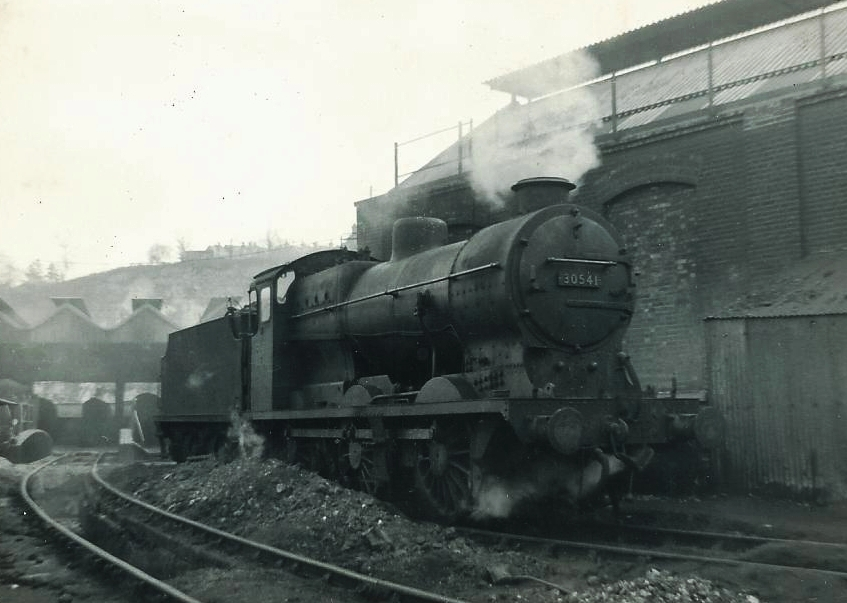
- 30541 at Guildford shed, 1963
Type and origin
- Power type: Steam
- Designer: Richard Maunsell
- Builder: SR Eastleigh Works
- Build date: 1938–1939
- Total produced: 20
Specifications
- Configuration
  - Whyte: 0-6-0
  - UIC: C h2
- Gauge: 4 ft 8 1/2 in (1,435 mm) standard gauge
- Driver dia.: 5 ft 1 in (1.549 m)
- Length: 53 ft 9 1/2 in (16.40 m)
- Width: 8 ft 4 in (2.54 m)
- Height: 12 ft 10 in (3.91 m)
- Loco weight: 49 long tons 10 cwt (110,900 lb or 50.3 t) (55 short tons)
- Tender weight: 40 long tons 10 cwt (90,700 lb or 41.1 t) (45 short tons)
- Total weight: 90 long tons 0 cwt (201,600 lb or 91.4 t) (101 short tons)
- Fuel type: Coal
- Fuel capacity: 5 long tons (5.1 tonnes; 5.6 short tons)
- Water cap.: 3,500 or 4,000 imp gal (15,900 or 18,200 L; 4,200 or 4,800 US gal)
- Boiler pressure: 200 lbf/in^{2} (13.79 bar; 1.38 MPa)
- Cylinders: Two, inside
- Cylinder size: 19 in × 26 in (483 mm × 660 mm)
Performance figures
- Tractive effort: 26,160 lbf (116.37 kN)
Career
- Operators: Southern Railway →; British Railways
- Class: SR: Q
- Power class: BR: 4F
- Numbers: SR: 530–549; BR: 30530–30549
- Locale: Southern Region
- Withdrawn: 1962–1965
- Disposition: One preserved, remainder scrapped

The Q Class is a type of 0-6-0 steam locomotive designed by Richard Maunsell of the Southern Railway and constructed immediately prior to the Second World War for use on medium-distance freight trains throughout the network. Twenty locomotives were built by Maunsell's successor, Oliver Bulleid, in 1938. The design was relatively old-fashioned and the class was soon afterwards eclipsed by Bulleid's own more powerful Q1 class. Nevertheless the locomotives performed adequately and reliably on the tasks for which they had been designed, until their withdrawal in 1965. Only one has survived, and is preserved on the Bluebell Railway.

== Background ==
The Southern Railway was primarily a passenger-carrying railway which used most of its resources to extend its electrified lines. There was a continuing need for steam freight locomotives however, although the Traffic Department preferred mixed-traffic designs which could also haul passenger trains on the remaining non-electrified lines at peak periods. By the late 1930s, the Southern Railway was adequately served with powerful mixed traffic locomotives of the S15, N, and N1 classes, but there was a need for a smaller freight locomotive with high route availability that could also undertake light passenger duties. This role had been performed by the ex-LSWR 'Jubilee' A12 0-4-2, which were approaching the end of their useful lives.

During his last year as the Chief Mechanical Engineer (CME) of the Southern Railway, Richard Maunsell decided on an inside-cylinder 0-6-0 tender locomotive to undertake this role, in what was to become the Q Class of 1938. This was a relatively ‘old-fashioned’ design for the late 1930s, although each of Britain's major railways built locomotives of this pattern until the 1940s. The class nevertheless contained several ‘modern’ features such as a Belpaire firebox, a superheater and a side-window cab. It was the last Southern steam locomotive design before the Second World War, and represented the final design of Maunsell's career, as he retired due to ill-health in 1937.

== Construction history ==
Maunsell's successor, Oliver Bulleid, oversaw the building of twenty members of the class at Eastleigh Works between January 1938 and September 1939. Bulleid is reported to have found the Q class uninspiring, having been manufactured to traditional Victorian principles of locomotive design, and is said to have stated that the order for the Q Class would have been cancelled if he had been appointed CME earlier. However, Bulleid had ample opportunity either to cancel the order or to build and test a single prototype, without incurring the expense of building twenty members of the class, if this was the case.

The class performed adequately and reliably on the tasks for which they were designed, but were less versatile than might have been hoped. When the requirement for modern freight locomotives on the Southern increased during the Second World War, Bulleid was faced with the options of continuing production of the Q Class, or designing a completely new locomotive. Taking the latter option, Bulleid designed what was to become the highly utilitarian Q1 class 0-6-0 locomotives.

=== Modifications ===
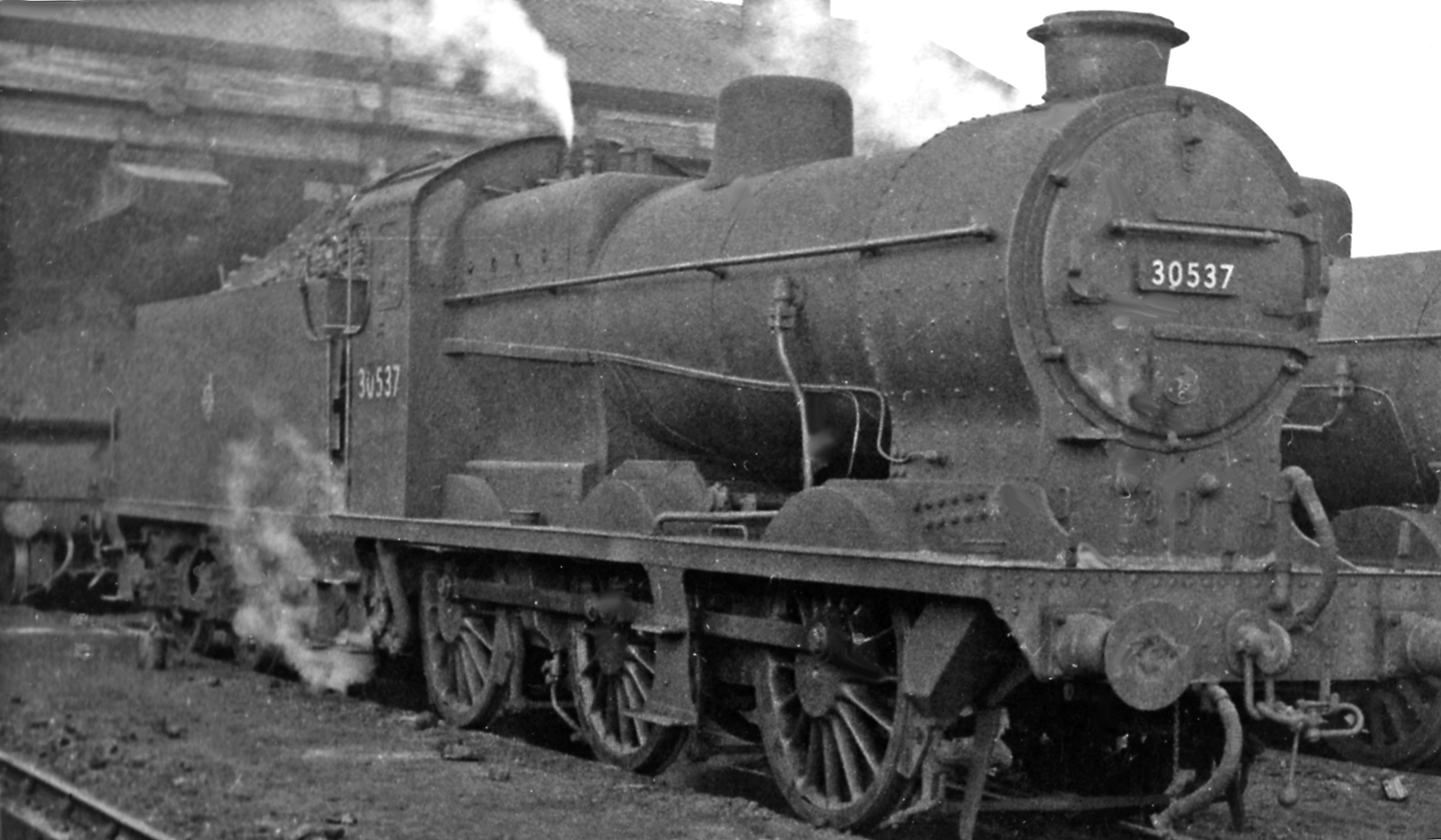
No. 30537 (fitted with Lemaitre blast-pipe and chimney) at Norwood Locomotive Depot 12 March 1960.

In common with most Maunsell designs the Q Class locomotives were reliable but faced complaints of poor steaming when used on main-line trains (for which they were never designed). In 1940 Bulleid fitted one member of the class with a Lemaître blast pipe in an attempt to improve efficiency. This proved to be successful and the remainder of the class were so fitted between 1946 and 1949. During the 1950s further experiments were carried out with the fitting of a British Railways Standard Class 4 plain blast pipe and small stovepipe chimney to no. 30549 in 1955, resulting in further improvements in both steaming and fuel consumption; in 1958–61 more received the same blast pipe with a BR Standard Class 4 chimney.

== Operational details and preservation ==
The locomotives were adequate and reliable on secondary services throughout their working lives, their utility compounded by their light weight and steady handling. They were however disappointing on main-line traffic until the draughting was improved after the war. They were fitted with steam carriage heating, and despite being primarily a freight design, periodically deputised in this duty.

British Railways inherited the class in 1948 and gave it a 4F power classification, F denoting a freight locomotive in power class 4. Withdrawals from service began during 1962 and were completed by 1965. Loco 30548 served more than 15 years at Bournemouth shed (71B).

== Preservation ==
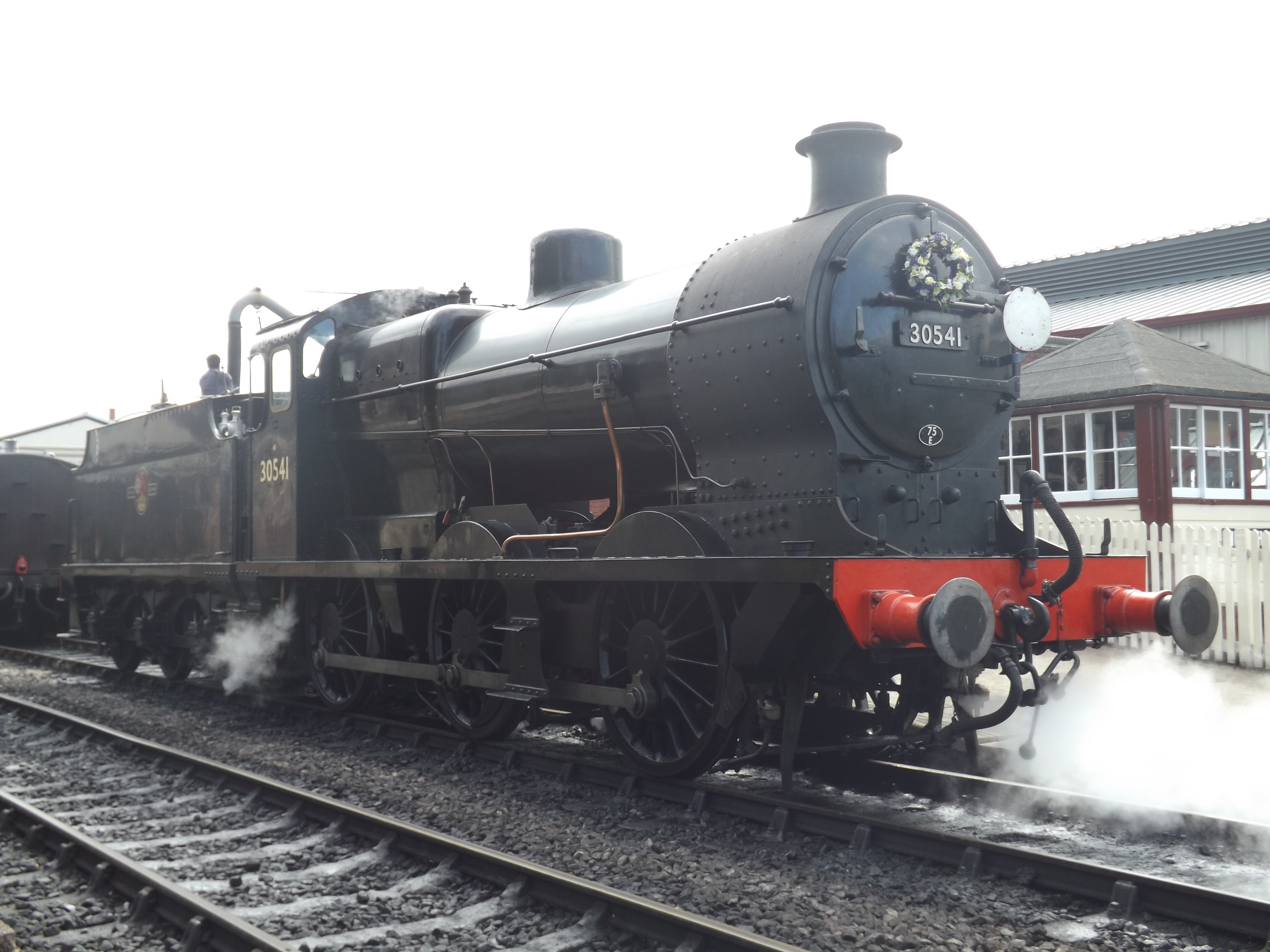
30541 running round at Sheffield Park

The class was not considered sufficiently important for official preservation, and had it not been for Woodham Brothers's scrapyard in Barry, South Wales, no examples would have survived. Only one, number 541 (BR No. 30541), was rescued, and has operated on the Bluebell Railway in Sussex. It is operational in BR Black livery after returning to service in April 2015 (following its absence since 1993).

== Livery and numbering ==
=== Southern Railway ===
Due to its primary role as a freight locomotive, the Q Class carried the Southern Black livery. The locomotive number and "Southern" were located on the tender, and were painted in Sunshine Yellow. The numbering of the locomotives under the Southern Railway ranged from 530 to 549. Even though they were built under the tenure of Bulleid, the locomotives never followed his adaptation of the UIC classification system which refers to the number of leading, trailing and driving axles – in this case three. Under this system, this class would have had the prefix "C" before the numbers, such as C30. In the event this form of numbering was applied to Bulleid's Q1 Class locomotives of 1942.

=== Post-1948 (nationalisation) ===
Early livery included the temporary retention of the Southern number and remained black, although in certain cases "British Railways" was applied to the tender in place of "Southern", in Sunshine Yellow. Under British Railways the class was given the power classification 4F. Immediately after nationalisation the Q Class was given a temporary "S" prefix to the original Southern Railway number. As overhauls and re-paints became due, the class was eventually re-numbered within the British Railways standard numbering system and the livery was changed to British Railways goods plain black with the crest on the tender and numbering on the side of the cab. These locomotive numbers ranged from 30530 to 30549.

== Locomotive summary ==
SR No.	BR No.	Date Built	Date Withdrawn
530	30530	January 1938	December 1964
531	30531	June 1938	July 1964
532	30532	June 1938	January 1964
533	30533	July 1938	March 1963
534	30534	August 1938	December 1962
535	30535	September 1938	April 1965
536	30536	October 1938	January 1964
537	30537	October 1938	December 1962
538	30538	November 1938	July 1963
539	30539	December 1938	January 1963
540	30540	December 1938	November 1962
541	30541	January 1939	November 1964
542	30542	February 1939	December 1964
543	30543	March 1939	December 1964
544	30544	April 1939	January 1964
545	30545	June 1939	May 1965
546	30546	June 1939	May 1964
547	30547	July 1939	January 1964
548	30548	August 1939	March 1965
549	30549	September 1939	July 1963
