= John Southern (engineer) =

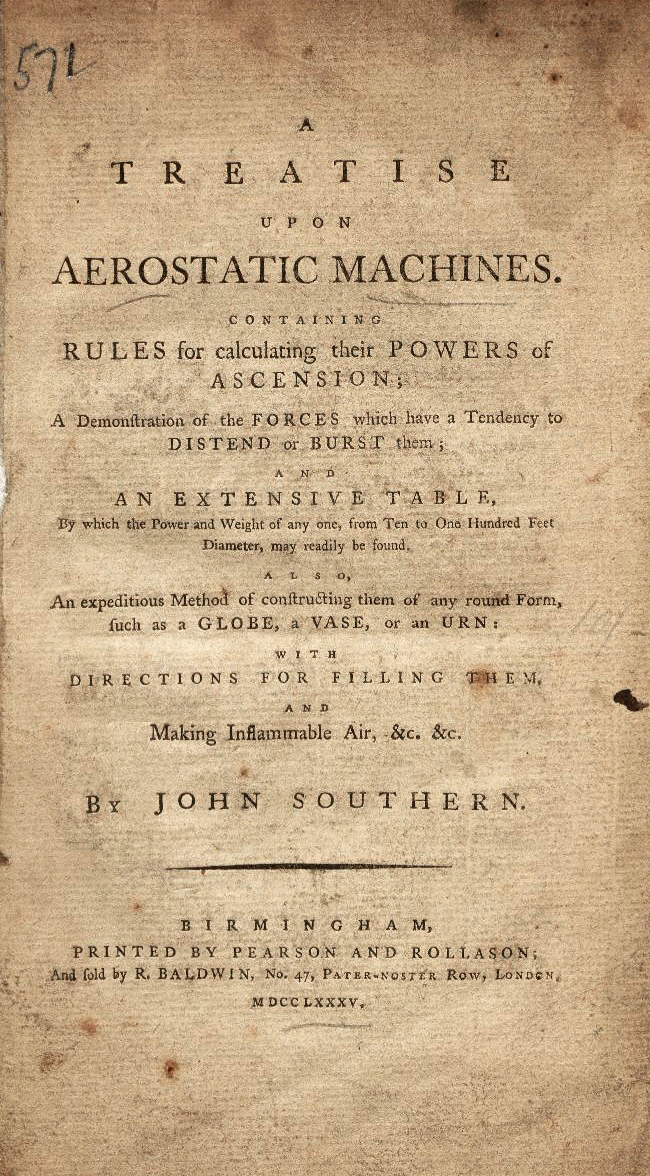
A Treatise upon Aerostatic Machines, 1785, by John Southern

John Southern (c. 1758–1815) was an English engineer, son of Thomas Southern of Derbyshire. In 1796 he and his employer James Watt co-invented the Indicator, an instrument for measuring and recording the pressure inside a steam engine cylinder through its stroke. This data was crucial for assessing an engine's efficiency. Southern became a partner of the firm of Boulton and Watt in 1810. The use of the instrument was kept as a trade secret for a generation, only becoming public in the 1830s.
