= Bulleid pacific =

Bulleid pacific may refer to the following classes of British steam railway locomotives:

- SR Merchant Navy Class
- SR West Country and Battle of Britain Classes
