= SR Lord Nelson Class 850 Lord Nelson =

British steam locomotive

850 Lord Nelson
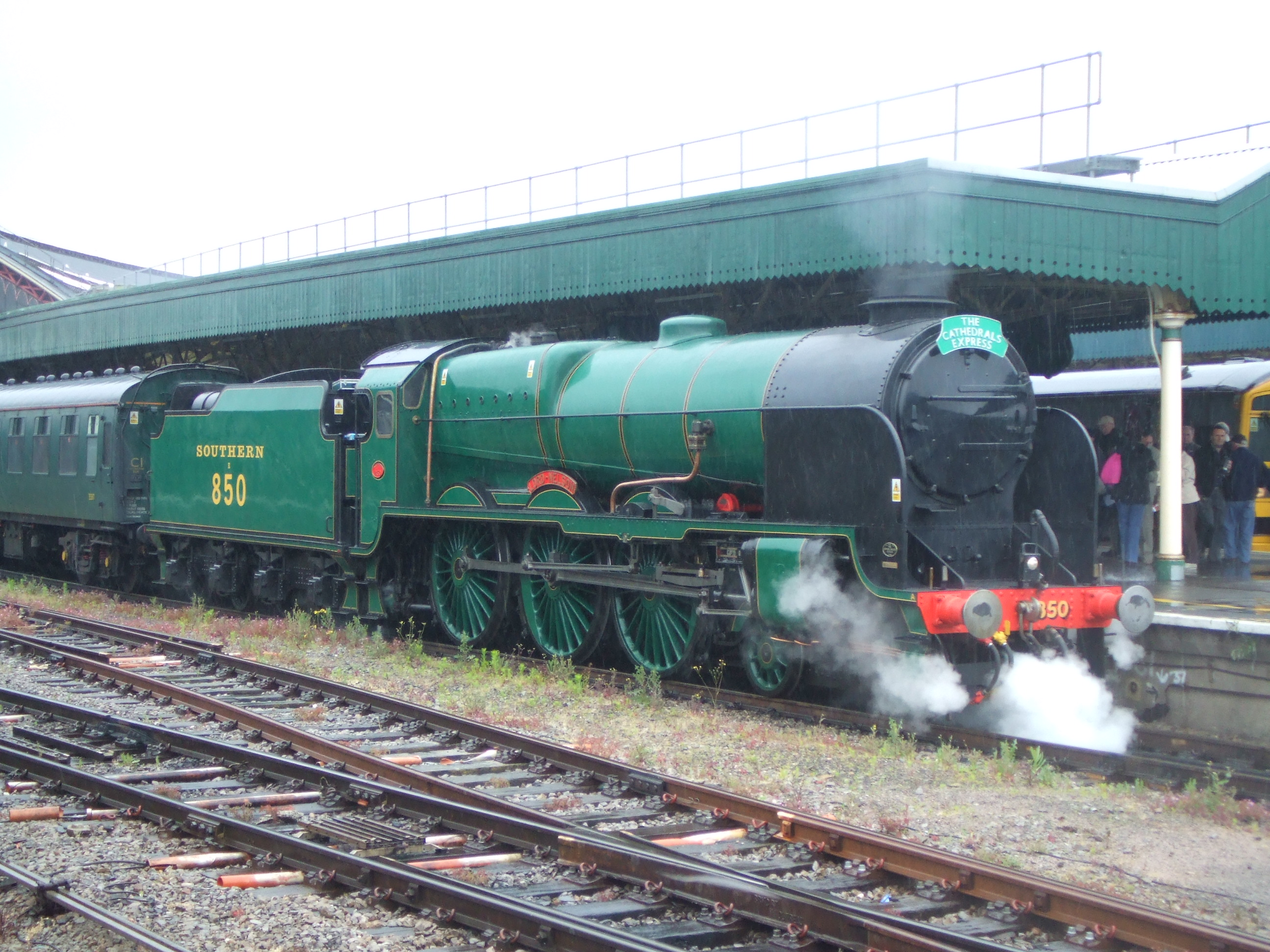
- 850 Lord Nelson seen in preservation, in May 2007
Type and origin
- Power type: Steam
- Designer: Richard Maunsell
- Builder: Eastleigh Works
- Build date: 1926
- Website: collection.sciencemuseum.org.uk/objects/co205792/southern-railway-lord-nelson-steam-locomotive
Specifications
- Configuration
  - Whyte: 4-6-0
  - UIC: 2′C h4
- Gauge: 4 ft 8 1/2 in (1,435 mm) standard gauge
- Leading dia.: 3 ft 1 in (0.940 m)
- Driver dia.: 6 ft 7 in (2.007 m)
- Length: 69 ft 9 3/4 in (21.3 m)
- Loco weight: 83 long tons 10 cwt (187,000 lb or 84.8 t)
- Tender weight: 57 long tons 19 cwt (129,800 lb or 58.9 t)
- Fuel type: Coal
- Fuel capacity: 5 long tons 0 cwt (11,200 lb or 5.1 t) (5.6 short tons)
- Water cap.: 5,000 imp gal (23,000 L; 6,000 US gal)
- Firebox
  - Grate area: 33 ft^{2} (3.1 m^{2})
- Boiler pressure: 220 lbf/in^{2} (1.52 MPa)
- Cylinders: Four
- Cylinder size: 16 1/2 in × 26 in (419 mm × 660 mm)
Performance figures
- Tractive effort: 33,510 lbf (149.06 kN)
Career
- Operators: Southern Railway →; British Railways (Southern Region)
- Class: Lord Nelson class
- Power class: BR: 7P
- Numbers: SR E850 (until 1928); SR 850 (1928-1947); BR 30850 (1948-1962)
- Official name: Lord Nelson
- Locale: Great Britain
- Withdrawn: August 1962
- Disposition: Out of service, awaiting an overhaul

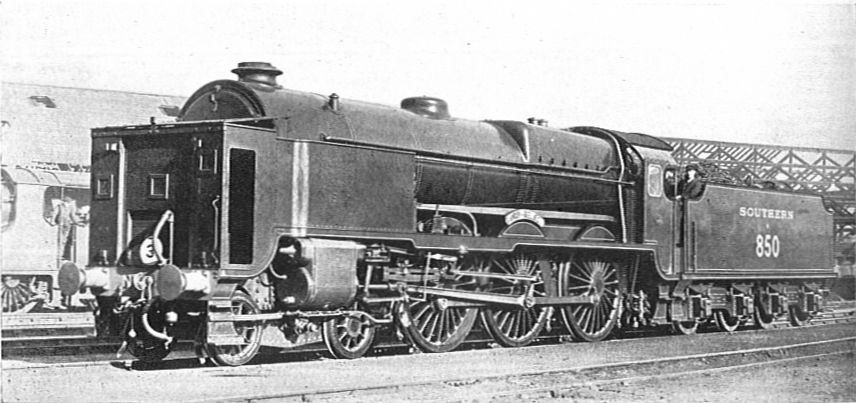
As E850 Lord Nelson, with an indicator shelter for prototype testing, c. 1926–1927

Southern Railway (SR) No. 850 Lord Nelson (originally E850, BR no. 30850) is a preserved British steam locomotive of the Lord Nelson class. It forms part of the United Kingdom's National Railway Collection.

== Overview ==
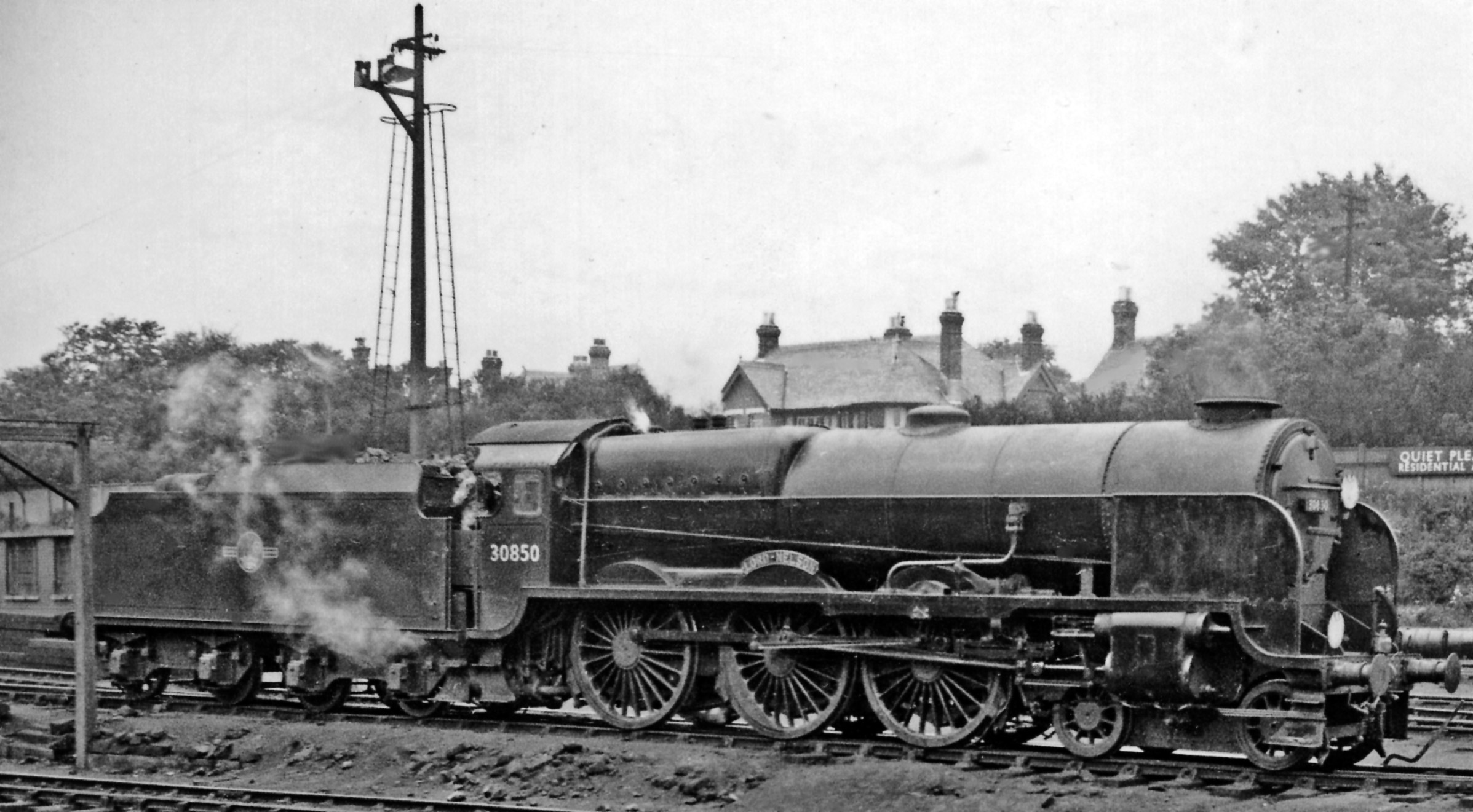
30850 at Bournemouth MPD in 1958

No. 850 was built at Eastleigh Works in 1926 to a design by R E L Maunsell, as the prototype for the 16-strong Lord Nelson class, and named after Horatio Nelson.

The Southern Railway became part of British Railways (BR) in 1948 through nationalisation, and was renumbered 30850. Under the BR, the class were given the power classification 7P. It was withdrawn from service in August 1962. It was preserved as part of the National Railway Collection, and was the sole survivor of the class. It has run in preservation, including on the main line, where its TOPS number is 98750. Its boiler certification expired in 2015.
