= Locomotives of the Southern Railway (UK) =

The Southern Railway took a key role in expanding the 660 V DC third rail electrified network begun by the London & South Western Railway. As a result of this, and its smaller operating area, its steam locomotive stock was the smallest of the 'Big Four' companies.

For an explanation of numbering and classification, see British Rail locomotive and multiple unit numbering and classification.

== Background ==
=== Post-nationalisation ===
British Railways completed construction of the 'West Country' and 'Merchant Navy' locomotive designs but did not build any further orders. It abandoned the 'Leader' class experiments, and Bulleid left the UK to carry forward his unusual locomotive designs in Ireland.

=== Withdrawal ===
Withdrawal of ex-SR locomotives happened mainly towards the end of steam on the Southern Region (in 1967), the pre-Grouping designs having gone before then as electrification spread across the region.

== Locomotives of SR design ==
With the heavy emphasis on electrification for the London suburban area and the Brighton mainline, there was little need for new steam locomotive designs. The main steam tasks were boat trains (Dover, Folkestone and Newhaven), West of England, Kent services and freight. When designing steam locomotives, the designers had some interesting constraints that dictated where the locomotive could be used. Due to the hangover from SE&CR days, most of the lines in Kent were of fairly light construction and would not take the weight of a modern express locomotive until well into the 1930s. Hence the extensive rebuilding (and new construction) of 4-4-0 designs at a time when other lines were busily building Pacifics or heavy 4-6-0s.

The ex-SER lines also had the problem of the narrow Mountfield and Wadhurst tunnels on the Hastings line, requiring locomotive and rolling stock rather narrower than permitted elsewhere. This problem persisted into British Railways days until eventually the tunnels were single tracked, giving clearance for normal stock.

Services for west of Southampton and Salisbury had a different set of problems as neither the Southern Railway nor its constituents installed water troughs, thus leading to large tenders with greater water capacity than those fitted to similar locomotives on other railways.

New designs were:

=== Richard E. L. Maunsell (1923–1937) ===
Class	Wheel arrangement	Date	Builder	No. built	Comments
K1	2-6-4T	1925	Ashford	1	Later converted to class "U1" tender engine (below).
L1	4-4-0	1926	North British	15	
Lord Nelson	4-6-0	1926-9	Eastleigh	16	
U	2-6-0	1928	Eastleigh	7	Rebuilds of "K" tanks
U	2-6-0	1928	Brighton	6	Rebuilds of "K" tanks
U	2-6-0	1928	Ashford	7	Rebuilds of "K" tanks
U	2-6-0	1928	Brighton	10	
U	2-6-0	1931	Ashford	20	
U1	2-6-0	1928	Ashford	1	Rebuild of "K1" tank
U1	2-6-0	1931	Eastleigh	20	
Z	0-8-0T	1929	Brighton	8	
V "Schools"	4-4-0	1930-5	Eastleigh	40	
W	2-6-4T	1932	Eastleigh	5	
W	2-6-4T	1935-6	Ashford	10	
Q	0-6-0	1938-9	Eastleigh	20	

Maunsell also rebuilt, modified or continued the new construction of earlier classes

- LSWR H15 class – Further production
- LSWR N15 class – Further production
- LSWR S15 class – Further production
- LSWR M7 class – One superheated – not repeated
- LSWR T9 class – Superheated
- LSWR 700 class – Superheated
- SECR B1 class
- SECR D class as D1 class
- SECR O class – rebuilt as O1 class
- SECR N class – Further production
- SECR N1 class – Three-cylinder derivative of N class
- LB&SCR C2 class
- LB&SCR L class 4-6-4T – rebuilt as 4–6–0 SR N15X class
- LB&SCR E1 class 0-6-0T – rebuilt as 0-6-2T SR E1/R class
- LB&SCR I1 class – rebuilt as I1X class

=== O.V.S. Bulleid (1937–1949) ===
Class	Wheel arrangement	Date	Builder	No. built	Comments
Q1	0-6-0	1942	Ashford	20	
Q1	0-6-0	1942	Brighton	20	
USA	0-6-0T	1942-3	Vulcan	13	
USA	0-6-0T	1942-3	H. K. Porter	2	
Merchant Navy	4-6-2	1941-9	Eastleigh	20	10 more built by BR
West Country/Battle of Britain	4-6-2	1945-51	Brighton	70	40 more built by BR
Leader	0-6-0+0-6-0T	1946-9	Brighton	5	Only one completed; appeared after nationalisation

Bulleid was also responsible for the mechanical part of the three electric locomotives (CC1–CC3, later British Railways Class 70), built at Ashford Works in 1941 (CC1) and 1948 (CC2, CC3). The electrical part was the responsibility of the Southern Railway's Chief Electrical Engineer, Alfred Raworth. Bulleid also designed a 500 hp 0-6-0 diesel mechanical shunter powered by a Davey Paxman power unit. This was built at Ashford Works, though was not introduced until 1950, when it emerged as BR No. 11001.

== Locomotives of constituent companies ==
=== London and South Western Railway ===
==== John Viret Gooch (1841–1851) ====
Class	Wheel arrangement	Fleet number(s)	Manufacturer	Year made	Quantity made	Quantity preserved	Year(s) withdrawn	Comments
John Viret Gooch (1841–1851)
Southampton	2-2-2	16–26	William Fairbairn & Sons	1841–42	11	0	1852–1872	Renewals of earlier locomotives
Eagle	2-2-2	27–30	Nine Elms Works	1843–44	4	0	1862–1863	
Alecto	2-2-2	46–47	William Fairbairn & Sons	1846–47	10	0	1863–1872	
Bison	0-6-0	49–52, 101–106	Nine Elms Works	1845–48	10	0	1863–1887	
Fireball	2-2-2	73–100	Rothwell and Company	1846–48	28	0	1862–1872	
Mazeppa	2-2-2	53–62	Nine Elms Works	1847	10	0	1862–1870	
Gem	2-2-2	107–108	Nine Elms Works	1847	2	0	1862–1868	
Rocklia	2-2-2	109–114	Christie, Adams and Hill	1848–49	6	0	1868–1870	
Vesuvius	2-2-2	115–123	Nine Elms Works	1849–1853	9	0	1870–1880	

==== Joseph Hamilton Beattie (1850–1871) ====
Class	Wheel arrangement	Fleet number(s)	Manufacturer	Year made	Quantity made	Quantity preserved	Year(s) withdrawn	Comments
Joseph Hamilton Beattie (1850–1871)
Hercules	2-4-0	5, 21, 26, 31–32, 35, 37, 40–44, 46–48	Nine Elms Works	1851–1854	15	0	1875–1884	5-foot-6-inch (1.676 m) drivers
Tartar	2-2-2WT	2, 12–13, 17–18, 33	Sharp Brothers	1852	6	0	1871–1874	
Sussex	2-2-2WT	1, 4, 6, 14–15, 19–20, 36	Nine Elms Works	1852	8	0	1871–1876	
Canute	2-2-2	130–135, 142, 149–153	Nine Elms Works	1856–1859	12	0	1875–1885	
Titan	2-4-0	45	Nine Elms Works	1856	1	0	1880	6-foot-1-inch (1.854 m) drivers
Saxon	2-4-0	124–129, 136–141	Nine Elms Works	1855–1857	12	0	1877–1885	5-foot (1.524 m) drivers
Chaplin	2-2-2WT	9–10, 34	Nine Elms Works	1856	3	0	1876–1877	
Minerva	2-4-0WT	11, 16, 39	Nine Elms Works	1856	3	0	1874–1883	
Nelson	2-4-0WT	143–145	Nine Elms Works	1858	3	0	1882–1885	
Nile	2-4-0WT	154–156	Nine Elms Works	1859	3	0	1882	
Tweed	2-4-0	146–148, 160–162	Nine Elms Works	1858–1859	6	0	1877–1879	6-foot (1.829 m) drivers
Undine	2-4-0	163–168, 170–175	Nine Elms Works	1859–60	12	0	1884–1886	6-foot-6-inch (1.981 m) drivers
Clyde	2-4-0	157–159, 169, 73–75, 95–100	Nine Elms Works	1859–1868	13	0	1883–1899	7-foot (2.134 m) drivers
Gem	2-4-0	107, 55–57, 67, 78	Nine Elms Works	1862–1863	6	0	1884–1885	5-foot (1.524 m) drivers
Eagle	2-4-0	27–30	Nine Elms Works	1862	3	0	1885–1886	6-foot (1.829 m) drivers
Falcon	2-4-0	29, 68–72, 77, 79–88	Nine Elms Works	1863–1867	17	0	1882–1898	6-foot-6-inch (1.981 m) drivers
177	2-4-0WT	177–220, 243–270, 33, 36, 76, 34, 44, 298–299, 314, 325–329	Beyer, Peacock & Co. (82); Nine Elms Works (3)	1863–1875	85	2	1886–1899, 1962	31 rebuilt as tender engines (1883–1892). Nº 298 & 314 preserved
Lion	0-6-0	3, 7–9, 10, 12–13, 16, 22–24, 38, 52–54, 58–60, 65, 92–94, 101–103, 108–113, 120, 176, 271–272, 291–293	Nine Elms Works	1863–1873	38	0	1886–1900	
Volcano	2-4-0	5, 11, 25–26, 31, 61–64, 66, 89–91, 114–118	Nine Elms Works	1866–1873	18	0	1886–1897	6-foot (1.829 m) drivers
221	0-6-0	221–226, 237–242, 273–278, 285–290	Beyer, Peacock & Co.	1866–1873	24	0	1891–1924	Double framed Goods
231	2-4-0	231–236	Beyer, Peacock & Co.	1866	6	0	1892–1899	6-foot (1.829 m) drivers
Vesuvius	2-4-0	1–2, 4, 6, 14–15, 17–21, 32, 35, 37, 39–43, 119, 121–122, 279–281, 294–297, 315–317	Nine Elms Works	1869–1875	32	0	1893–1899	6-foot-6-inch (1.981 m) drivers

==== William George Beattie (1871–1878) ====
Class	Wheel arrangement	Fleet number(s)	Manufacturer	Year made	Quantity made	Quantity preserved	Year(s) withdrawn	Comments
William George Beattie (1871–1878)
273	0-6-0	273-278, 285-290	Beyer, Peacock & Co.	1872-1873	12	0	1906-1924	Double framed Goods
282	0-6-0	282–284, 300–301, 324, 393–394	Beyer, Peacock & Co.	1873–1880	8	0	1905–1913	"Ilfracombe Goods"
302	0-6-0	302–313, 336–347, 368–373, 151, 152, 160, 162, 229	Beyer, Peacock & Co.	1874–1878	35	0	1889–1925	Single framed Goods
318	4-4-0T	318–323	Beyer, Peacock & Co.	1875	6	0	1906–1913	"Plymouth Tank"
330	0-6-0ST	330–335, 227–228, 127–128, 131, 149–150, 161, 409–414	Beyer, Peacock & Co.	1876–1882	20	0	1924–1933	"Saddleback"
348	4-4-0	348–367	Beyer, Peacock & Co.	1877	20	0	1889–1905	"Jumbo"

==== William Adams (1878–1895) ====
Class	Wheel arrangement	Fleet number(s)	Manufacturer	Year made	Quantity made	Quantity preserved	Year(s) withdrawn	Comments
William Adams (1878–1895)
46	4-4-0T	46, 123–124, 130, 132–133, 374–379	Beyer, Peacock & Co.	1879	12	0	1914–1925	Rebuilt to 4-4-2T in 1883–1886
380	4-4-0	380–391	Beyer, Peacock & Co.	1879	12	0	1913–1925	
135	4-4-0	135–146	Beyer, Peacock & Co.	1880–1881	12	0	1913–1924	
395	0-6-0	27–30, 83–84, 101, 105, 134, 148, 153–159, 163–168, 172, 174–175, 395–406, 433–444, 496–515	Neilson & Co.	1881–1886	70	0	1916–1959	
415	4-4-2T	45, 47–57, 68, 77–78, 82, 104, 106–107, 125–126, 129, 169–171, 173, 415–432, 479–495, 516–525	Beyer, Peacock & Co. Dübs & Co. Neilson & Co. Robert Stephenson & Co.	1882–1885	74	1	1916–1961	"Radial tank"; 68, 77–78 renumbered 58–60 in 1889–1890. Several were sent to other railways, particularly the East Kent Railway and the Highland Railway, during World War I.
445	4-4-0	445–456	Robert Stephenson & Co.	1883	12	0	1923–1925	
460	4-4-0	147, 460–478, 526	Neilson & Co. Robert Stephenson & Co.	1884–1887	21	0	1924–1929	
A12	0-4-2	527–556, 597–656	Nine Elms Works; Neilson & Co.	1887–1895	90	0	1928–1948	"Jubilee"
T1	0-4-4T	1–20, 60–80, 358–367	Nine Elms Works	1888–1896	50	0	1931–1951	
O2	0-4-4T	177–236	Nine Elms Works	1889–1895	60	1	1933–1967	23 transferred to the Isle of Wight (1923–1949)
X2	4-4-0	577–596	Nine Elms Works	1890–1892	20	0	1930–1942	
T3	4-4-0	557–576	Nine Elms Works	1892–1893	20	1	1930–1945	
B4	0-4-0T	81, 85–100, 102–103, 176	Nine Elms Works	1891–1893	20	2	1948–1963	
G6	0-6-0T	160, 162, 237–240, 257–279, 348–349, 351, 353–354	Nine Elms Works	1894–1900	34	0	1948–1962	
T6	4-4-0	677–686	Nine Elms Works	1895–1896	10	0	1933–1943	
X6	4-4-0	657–666	Nine Elms Works	1895–1896	10	0	1933–1946	

==== Dugald Drummond (1895–1912) ====
Class	Wheel arrangement	Fleet number(s)	Manufacturer	Year made	Quantity made	Quantity preserved	Year(s) withdrawn	Comments
Dugald Drummond (1895–1912)
700	0-6-0	687–715	Dübs & Co.	1897	30	0	1957–1962	"Black Motor"; 702–716 renumbered 306…368
T7	4-2-2-0	720	Nine Elms Works	1897	1	0	1927	
M7	0-4-4T	21–60, 104–112, 123–133, 241–256, 318–324, 328, 356–357, 374–379, 479–481, 667–676	Nine Elms Works; Eastleigh Works	1897–1911	105	2	1937–1965	"Motor tank"
C8	4-4-0	290–299	Nine Elms Works	1898	10	0	1933–1938	
F9	4-2-4T	733	Nine Elms Works	1899	1	0	1940	"The Bug"; renumbered 58S in 1924
T9	4-4-0	113–122, 280–289, 300–305, 307, 310–314, 336–338, 702–719, 721–732, 773	Nine Elms Works; Dübs & Co.	1899–1901	66	1	1951–1963	"Greyhound"; 773 renumbered 733 in 1924.
E10	4-2-2-0	369–373	Nine Elms Works	1901	5	0	1926–1927	
K10	4-4-0	135–146, 149–153, 329, 340–345, 347, 380–394	Nine Elms Works	1901–1902	40	0	1947–1951	"Small Hopper"
L11	4-4-0	134, 148, 154–159, 161, 163–175, 405–414, 435–442	Nine Elms Works	1903–1907	40	0	1949–1952	"Large Hopper"
S11	4-4-0	395–404	Nine Elms Works	1903	10	0	1951–1954	
L12	4-4-0	415–424	Nine Elms Works	1904–1905	20	0	1951–1955	"Bulldog"
F13	4-6-0	330–334	Nine Elms Works	1905	5	0	1921–1924	
C14	2-2-0T	736–745	Nine Elms Works	1906–1907	10	0	1916–1918	"Potato Can"; four rebuilt 0-4-0T, others sold
E14	4-6-0	335	Nine Elms Works	1907	1	0	1914	"The Turkey"; rebuilt to H15 class
G14	4-6-0	453–457	Nine Elms Works	1908	5	0	1925	Rebuilt to N15 class
K14	0-4-0T	746–747, 82–84	Nine Elms Works	1908	5	0	1948–1957	746 & 747 renumbered 101 & 147 in 1922
P14	4-6-0	448–452	Eastleigh Works	1910–1911	5	0	1925–1927	Rebuilt to N15 class
T14	4-6-0	443–447, 458–462	Eastleigh Works	1911–1912	10	0	1940–1951	"Paddlebox" or "Paddleboat"
D15	4-4-0	463–472	Eastleigh Works	1912–1913	10	0	1951–1956	

==== Robert W. Urie (1912–1922) ====
Class	Wheel arrangement	Fleet number(s)	Manufacturer	Year made	Quantity made	Quantity preserved	Year(s) withdrawn	Comments
Robert W. Urie (1912–1922)
H15	4-6-0	482–491	Eastleigh Works	1914	10	0	1955–1961	
H15	4-6-0	335	Eastleigh Works	1914	1	0	1959	Rebuilt from E14 class
H15	4-6-0	473–478, 521–524	Eastleigh Works	1925	10	0	1959–1961	
H15	4-6-0	330–334	Eastleigh Works	1925	5	0	1959	Rebuilt from F13 class
N15	4-6-0	736–745	Eastleigh Works	1918–1919	10	0	1955–1958	
N15	4-6-0	746–755	Eastleigh Works	1922–1923	10	0	1955–1957	
N15	4-6-0	448–457	Eastleigh Works	1925	10	0	1958–1961	Rebuilt from P14 and G14 classes
N15	4-6-0	763–792	North British Locomotive Co.	1925	30	1	1958–1962	777 Sir Lamiel preserved
N15	4-6-0	793–806	Eastleigh Works	1926–1927	14	0	1959–1962	Built with 6-wheel tenders
S15	4-6-0	496–515	Eastleigh Works	1920–1921	20	2	1962–1964	
S15	4-6-0	823–837	Eastleigh Works	1927–1928	15	3	1962–1965	
S15	4-6-0	838–847	Eastleigh Works	1936	10	2	1963–1968	
G16	4-8-0T	492–495	Eastleigh Works	1921	4	0	1959–1962	
H16	4-6-2T	516–520	Eastleigh Works	1921–1922	5	0	1962	

=== South Eastern Railway ===
==== Benjamin Cubitt (1842-1845) ====
No SER locomotives built – stock administered by the London and Croydon, South Eastern, and London and Brighton Joint Locomotive Committee.

==== James Cudworth (1845-1876) ====
- White Horse of Kent, 2-2-2, introduced 1845, later rebuilt as a 2-4-0
- SER 118 class 0-6-0 introduced 1855
- SER 59 class 2-4-0 introduced 1857
- SER Singles 2-2-2 introduced 1861
- SER 235 class 0-4-4T introduced 1866

==== John Ramsbottom (1876) ====
- SER Ironclads 2-4-0 introduced 1876

==== A. M. Watkin (1876) ====
- SER 152 class 'Folkestone Tanks' 0-6-0T introduced 1877

==== Richard Mansell (1877-1878) ====
- SER 58 class 'Mansell Gunboats' 0-4-4T introduced 1878
- SER 59 class 'Mansell Goods' 0-6-0 introduced 1879

==== James Stirling (1878-1898) ====
Stirling, like his brother Patrick, built engines with domeless boilers. Many, however, were rebuilt with domes in later years.

Class	Wheel arrangement	Date	No. built	Comments
A	4-4-0	1879-81	12	
O	0-6-0	1878-99	122	58 rebuilt 1903-27 (Class O1)
299	4-4-0T	1880	3	Made by Beyer-Peacock. Of Metropolitan Railway type, sold to that company in 1884
302	0-4-0T	1881-96	2	Crane tanks, made by Neilson and Company
313	0-4-0ST	1881	1	made by Manning Wardle
Q	0-4-4T	1881-97	118	First 12 fitted with condensers. 55 rebuilt 1903-19 (Class Q1)
F	4-4-0	1883-98	88	76 rebuilt 1903-19 (Class F1)
R	0-6-0T	1888-98	25	13 rebuilt 1910-22 (Class R1)
353	0-6-0T	1890	1	made by Manning Wardle
B	4-4-0	1898-9	29	27 rebuilt 1910-27 (Class B1)

=== London, Chatham and Dover Railway ===
Initially, LC&DR engines were given names, they only received numbers after 1874.

On the merger with the South Eastern in 1898, engine numbers were increased by 459, this being the highest number in use on that line.

==== Joseph Cubitt and Thomas Russell Crampton (1853–1860) ====
Class	Wheel arrangement	LCDR number(s)	SECR numbers	Manufacturer	Year made	Quantity made	Quantity preserved	Year(s) withdrawn	Comments
Joseph Cubitt and Thomas Russell Crampton (1853–1860)
Sondes	4-4-0ST	—	—	R & W Hawthorn	1858	6	0	1865	
Tiger	4-4-0	3–26	4A…10A, 470…485	Brassey & Co. R & W Hawthorn; Slaughter, Grüning & Co.	1861–1862	24	0	1893–1907	Rebuilt as 2-4-0s in 1863–1865
Echo	4-2-0	27–31	486…490	Robert Stephenson & Co.	1862	5	0	1896–1906	Rebuilt as conventional 4-4-0s in 1865–1866

==== Surplus and secondhand acquisitions (1860–1861) ====
Class	Wheel arrangement	LCDR number(s)	SECR numbers	Manufacturer	Year made	Quantity made	Quantity preserved	Year(s) withdrawn	Comments
Surplus and secondhand acquisitions (1860–1861)
Meteor	2-2-2	—	—	R & W Hawthorn	1855	2	0	1871–72	Bought May 1860; rebuilt as 2-2-2T in 1866.
Swale	0-6-0	141	—	unknown	unknown	1	0	1881	Bought June 1860; rebuilt as 0-6-0ST in 1865.
Magnus	0-4-0	142	—	R & W Hawthorn	1860	1	0	1881	Bought June 1860; rebuilt as 0-4-2T and renamed Magnet in October 1860.
Hercules	0-4-0	143–144	—	R & W Hawthorn	unknown	2	0	1881	Bought August 1860; rebuilt as 0-6-0ST in 1865.
Aeolus	4-4-0T	71–74	—	R & W Hawthorn	1860–1861	4	0	1873	
ex-LNWR 2-2-0s	2-2-0	—	—	Bury, Curtis, and Kennedy; Rothwell and Co.	1838–1845	3	0	1863	Bought August 1860
Brigand	0-4-2	1–2	460–461	Sharp, Stewart & Co.	1861	2	0	1903	Glasgow and South Western Railway design
Ruby	2-4-0	65–70	—	R & W Hawthorn	1856	6	0	1889–1891	Bought June 1861 from the Dutch Rhenish Railway (Nos. 31–36); rebuilt as 2-4-0T in 1864–1865; renumbered 145–150 in 1875

==== William Martley (1860–1874) ====
Class	Wheel arrangement	LCDR number(s)	SECR numbers	Manufacturer	Year made	Quantity made	Quantity preserved	Year(s) withdrawn	Comments
William Martley (1860–1874)
Acis	0-6-0	113–126	572–585	Sharp, Stewart & Co. Robert Stephenson & Co.	1861–62	14	0	1903–1908	
Adrian	0-6-0	127–132	586–591	John Fowler & Co.	1866	6	0	1907–1910	
Huz	0-6-0	133–134	(592–593)	Sharp, Stewart & Co.	1873	2	0	1902	
New Aeolus	2-4-0T	71–74	530–533	Longhedge Works	1872–1873	4	0	1905–1909	
Rose	2-4-0T	75–80	—	R & W Hawthorn	1863	6	0	1881–1883	
Second Sondes	2-4-0T	59–64	518–523	Longhedge Works	1865	6	0	1909	
Scotchmen	0-4-2T	81–94	540–553	Neilson & Co.	1866	14	0	1904–1909	
Large Scotchmen	0-4-2T	95–100	554–559	Neilson & Co.	1873	6	0	1909–1914	
Dawn	2-4-0	32–37	491–496	Sharp, Stewart & Co.	1862	6	0	1904–1907	
Bluebell	2-4-0	38–43	497–502	Sharp, Stewart & Co.	1863	6	0	1904–1908	
Reindeer	2-4-0	44–49	503–508	Brassey & Co.	1865	6	0	1904–1908	
Enigma	2-4-0	50–52	509–511	Longhedge Works	1869–1870	3	0	1905–1906	
Europa	2-4-0	53–56	512–515	Sharp, Stewart & Co.	1873	4	0	1907–1909	
Europa	2-4-0	57–58	516–517	Longhedge Works	1876	2	0	1908–1909	

==== William Kirtley (1874–1898) ====
Class	Wheel arrangement	LCDR number(s)	SECR numbers	Manufacturer	Year made	Quantity made	Quantity preserved	Year(s) withdrawn	Comments
William Kirtley (1874–1898)
A	0-4-4T	65–70, 101–112	524–529, 560–571	Vulcan Foundry; Neilson & Co.	1875	18	0	1915–1926	
A1	0-4-4T	163–174	622–633	Kitson & Co.	1880	12	0	1923–1926	
A2	0-4-4T	75–80	534–539	Robert Stephenson & Co.	1883–1884	6	0	1925–1926	
R	0-4-4T	199–216	658–675	Sharp, Stewart & Co.	1891	18	0	1940–1955	
B	0-6-0	135–140	594–599	Dübs & Co.	1876	6	0	1912–1915	
B1	0-6-0	151–156	610–615	Dübs & Co.	1877	6	0	1912–1924	
B2	0-6-0	193–198	652–657	Vulcan Foundry	1891	6	0	1929–1933	
T	0-6-0T	141–150	600–609	Longhedge Works	1879–1891	10	0	1932–1951	
M	4-4-0	157–162	616–621	Neilson & Co.	1877	6	0	1911–1914	
M1	4-4-0	175–178	634–637	Longhedge Works	1880–1881	4	0	1912–1923	
M2	4-4-0	179–186	638–645	Longhedge Works; Dübs & Co.	1884–1885	8	0	1912–1923	
M3	4-4-0	187–192, 3–8, (9–10), 12–17, 19, 20, 23–25, (26)	646–651, 462–469, 471–476, 478, 479, 482–485	Vulcan Foundry, Longhedge Works	1891–1900	26	0	1925–1928	

=== South Eastern and Chatham Railway ===
Before 1899, both the South Eastern Railway and the London, Chatham and Dover Railway had some Crampton locomotives built by Robert Stephenson and Company. The SER also had some Cramptons built by Tulk and Ley.

==== H. S. Wainwright (1899–1913) ====
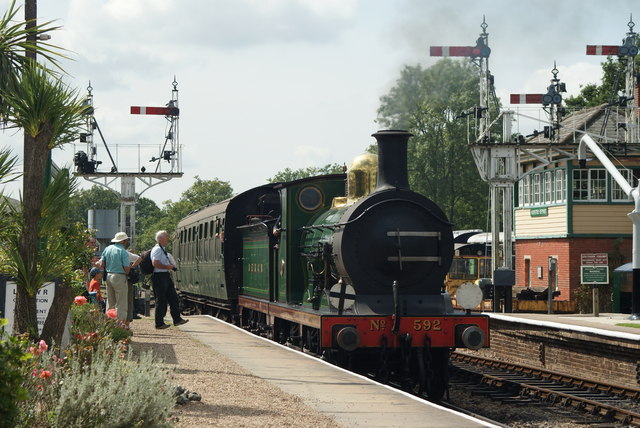
SECR C class, No. 592 arrives with the train for Kingscote. The signal box, and two signal gantries are in evidence.

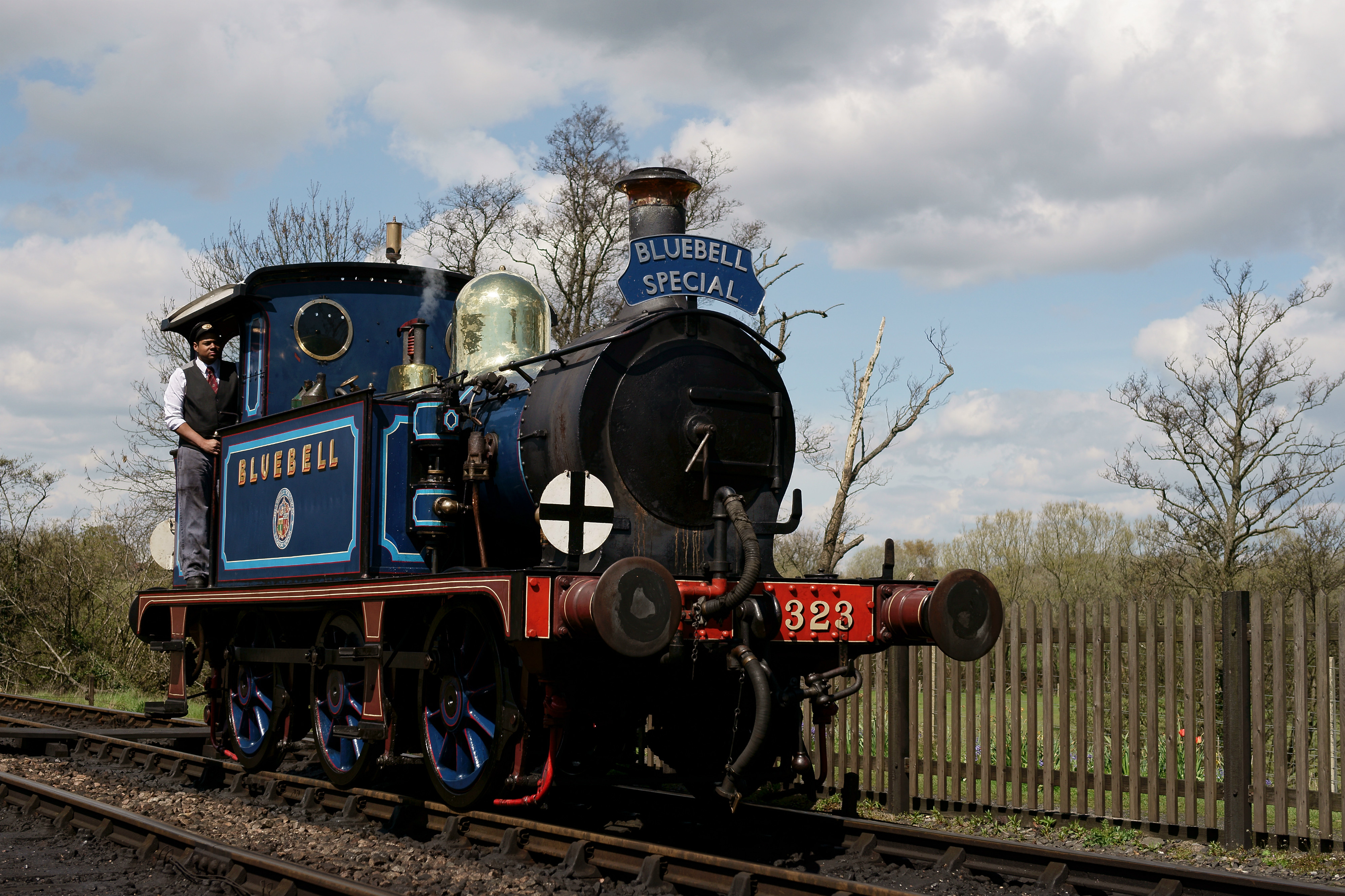
Bluebell Railway SECR P class 323 Bluebell

Class	Wheel arrangement	Date	Builder	No. Built	Comments
G	4-4-0	1900	Neilson	5	Originally built for the GNoSR
C	0-6-0	1900-4	SECR Ashford (70)	109	No. 685 converted to a saddle tank in 1917 (Class S)
C	0-6-0	1901-4	LCDR Longhedge (9)	109	
C	0-6-0	1900	Neilson (15)	109	
C	0-6-0	1900	Sharp Stewart (15)	109	
R1	0-4-4T	1900	Sharp Stewart	15	
H	0-4-4T	1904-15	SECR Ashford	66	
D	4-4-0	1901	Sharp Stewart (10)	51	21 rebuilt as Class D1 1921-7 (below)
D	4-4-0	1903	Stephenson (5)	51	21 rebuilt as Class D1 1921-7 (below)
D	4-4-0	1903	Vulcan Foundry (5)	51	21 rebuilt as Class D1 1921-7 (below)
D	4-4-0	1903	Dübs (10)	51	21 rebuilt as Class D1 1921-7 (below)
D	4-4-0	1901-7	SECR Ashford (21)	51	21 rebuilt as Class D1 1921-7 (below)
A1	0-6-0T	1876	LBSCR Brighton	1*	LBSCR No. 54 'Waddon' was purchased from LBSCR in 1904 and numbered 751
E	4-4-0	1905-10	SECR Ashford	26	11 rebuilt as Class E1 1919-20 (below)
P	0-6-0T	1909-10	SECR Ashford	8	
J	0-6-4T	1913	SECR Ashford	5	
L	4-4-0	1914	Borsig (10)	22	
L	4-4-0	1914	Beyer-Peacock (12)	22	

- SECR B1 class 4-4-0 introduced 1900 rebuild of SER B Class
- SECR F1 class 4-4-0 introduced 1903 rebuild of SER F Class
- SECR O1 class 0-6-0 introduced 1903 rebuild of SER O Class
- SECR R1 class 0-6-0T introduced 1910 rebuild of SER R Class

==== R. E. L. Maunsell (1913–1922) ====
Class	Wheel arrangement	Date	Builder	No. Built	Comments
N	2-6-0	1917-22	SECR Ashford	12	68 more built by SR 1923-33
N1	2-6-0	1922	SECR Ashford	1	3 cylinder variant of Class N. 5 more built by Southern Railway in 1930
K	2-6-4T	1917	SECR Ashford	1	"River" class. 20 more built by Southern Railway in 1925-6. All later converted to Class "U" tender engines.
S	0-6-0ST	1917		1	Rebuild of Class C tender engine.
E1	4-4-0	1919	SECR Ashford	1	Rebuilds of Class E
E1	4-4-0	1920	Beyer-Peacock	10	Rebuilds of Class E
D1	4-4-0	1922-7	SECR Ashford	11	Rebuilds of Class D
D1	4-4-0	1921	Beyer-Peacock	10	Rebuilds of Class D

=== London, Brighton and South Coast Railway ===
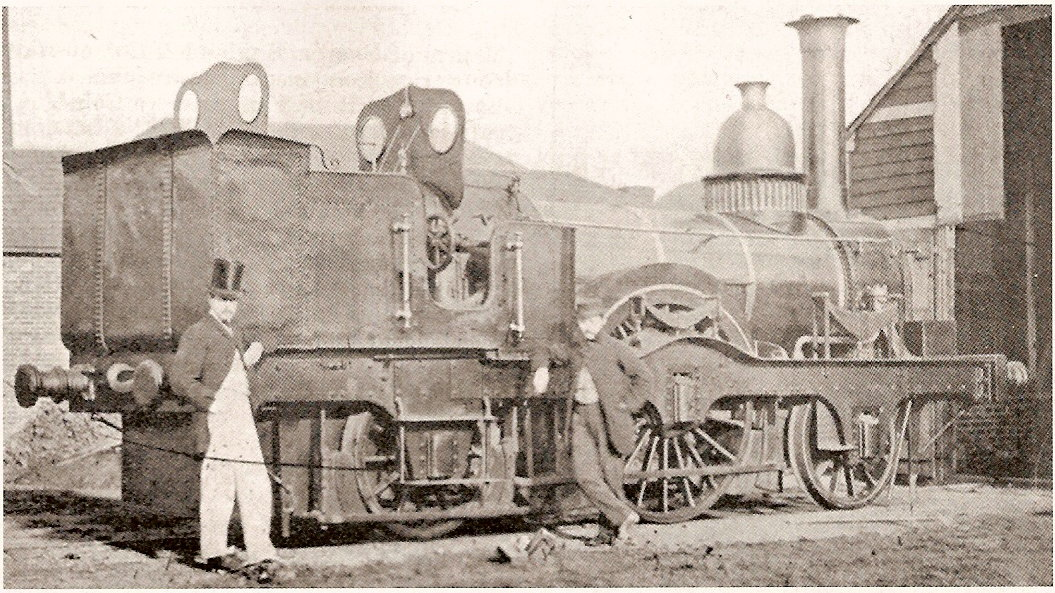
LBSCR 2-2-2WT, built by Sharp Brothers in 1849

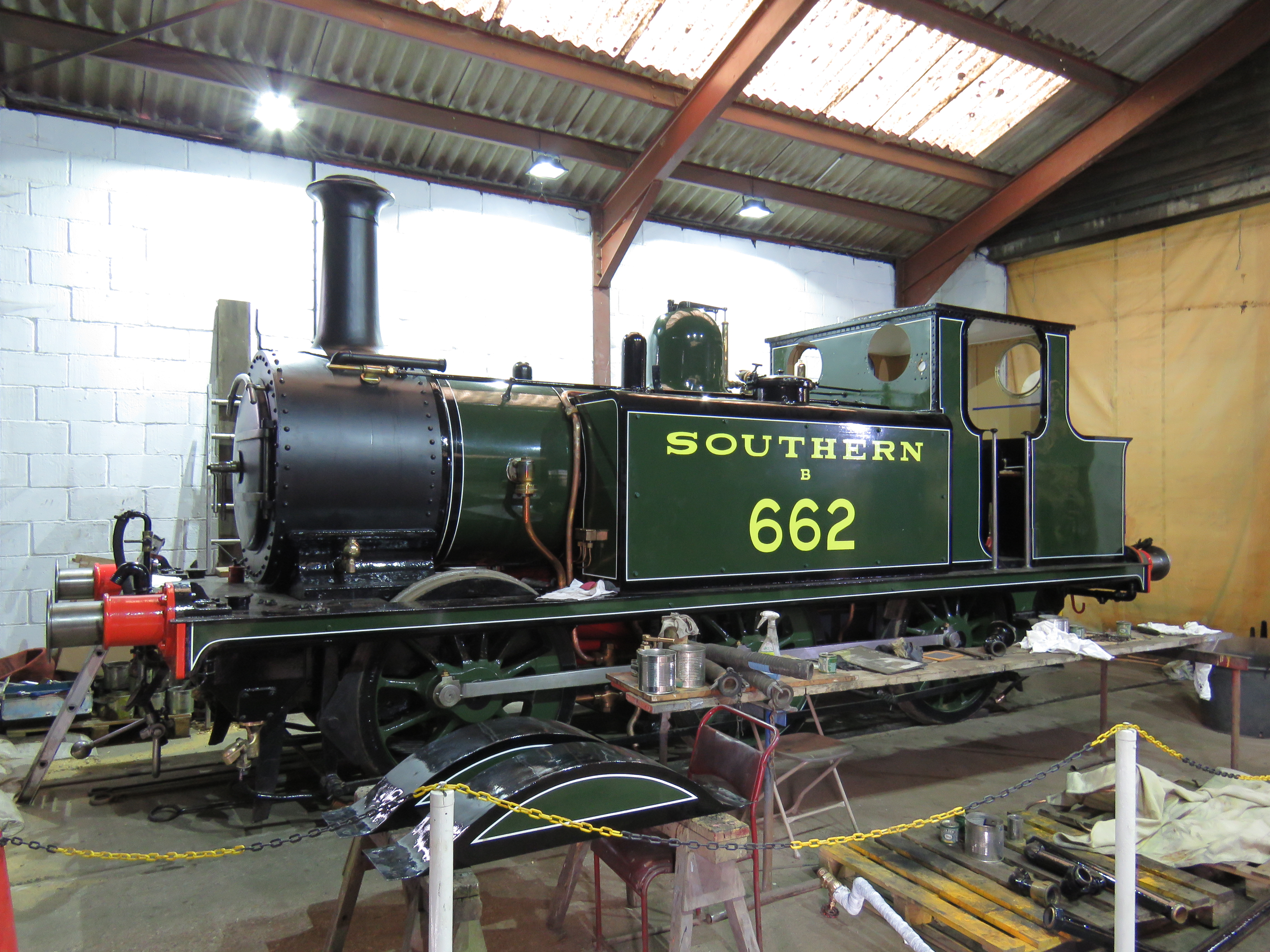
LBSCR A1 class Martello

==== William Stroudley (1870–1889) ====
Many of these engines were later renumbered, frequently into the "duplicate" series above 600.

Orig. Class	Later Class	Wheel arrangement	Date	No. built	Loco Nos.	Comments
18		0-4-2T	1871	2	18, 21	
C "Jumbo"		0-6-0	1871-4	20	77-96	
A "Terrier"	A1	0-6-0T	1872-80	50	35-84	17 rebuilt as A1X, many sold to other railways
B ”Belgravia”		2-4-0	1872-5	6	201-7	
		2-4-0T	1873	1	53	Built by Sharp Stewart
D	D1	0-4-2T	1873-87	125	1-36, 221-297, 351-362	1 rebuilt as Class D1X in 1910
E	E1	0-6-0T	1874-91	78	85-156, 159-64	1 rebuilt as Class E1X in 1911, 10 converted to 0-6-2T (Class E1R) by Southern Railway.
B	G	2-2-2	1874	1	151	"Grosvenor"
D "Lyons"	D2	0-4-2	1876-83	14	300-313	
F	G	2-2-2	1877	1	325	"Abergavenny"
B “Richmond”		0-4-2	1878-80	6	208-213	
G		2-2-2	1880-2	24	327-350	
C "Jumbo"	C1	0-6-0	1882-7	12	421-432	
B "Gladstone"	B1	0-4-2	1882-91	36	172-200, 214-220	
E Special		0-6-0T	1884	1	157	"Barcelona"
F	E3	0-6-2T	1891	1	158	"West Brighton"

==== R. J. Billinton (1890–1904) ====
Class	Wheel arrangement	Date	No. built	Loco Nos.	Comments
D3	0-4-4T	1892-6	36	363-398	396 and 397 rebuilt as Class D3X in 1909
C2	0-6-0	1893-1902	55	433-452, 521-555	42 rebuilt as Class C2X 1908-40
B2	4-4-0	1895-8	24	171, 201-212, 314-324	all rebuilt as Class B2X 1907-10
B3	4-4-0	1898	1	213	all rebuilt as Class B2X 1907-10
B4	4-4-0	1899-1902	33	42-74	12 rebuilt as Class B4X 1922-4
E3	0-6-2T	1894-5	16	165-170, 453-462	Similar to No. 158
E4	0-6-2T	1897-1903	75	463-520, 556-566, 577-582	4 rebuilt as Class E4X 1909-11
E5	0-6-2T	1902-4	30	399-406, 567-576, 583-594	4 rebuilt as Class E5X in 1911
E6	0-6-2T	1904-5	12	407-418	2 rebuilt as class E6X in 1911

==== D. Earle Marsh (1905–1911) ====
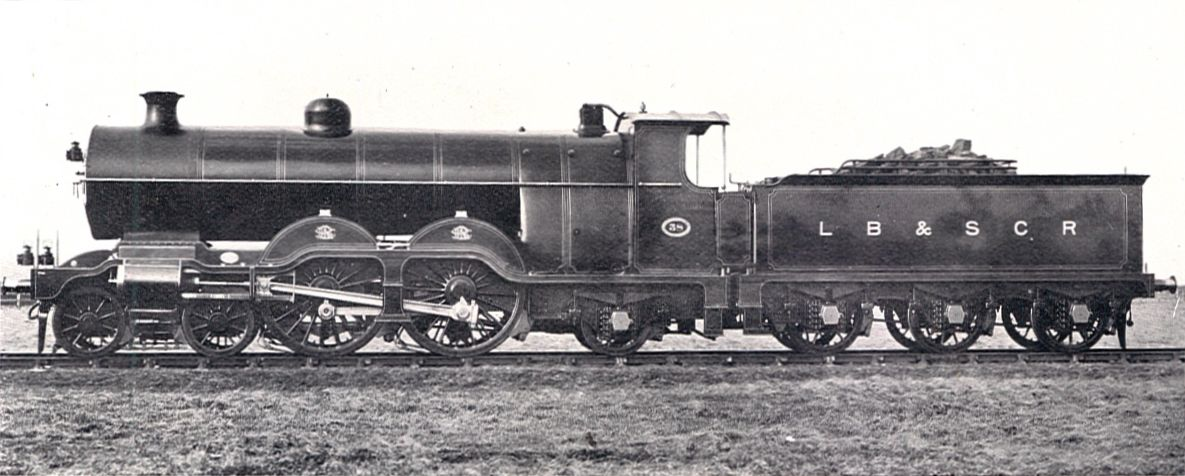
LB&SCR H1 class 4-4-2 locomotive, 38 Portland Bill

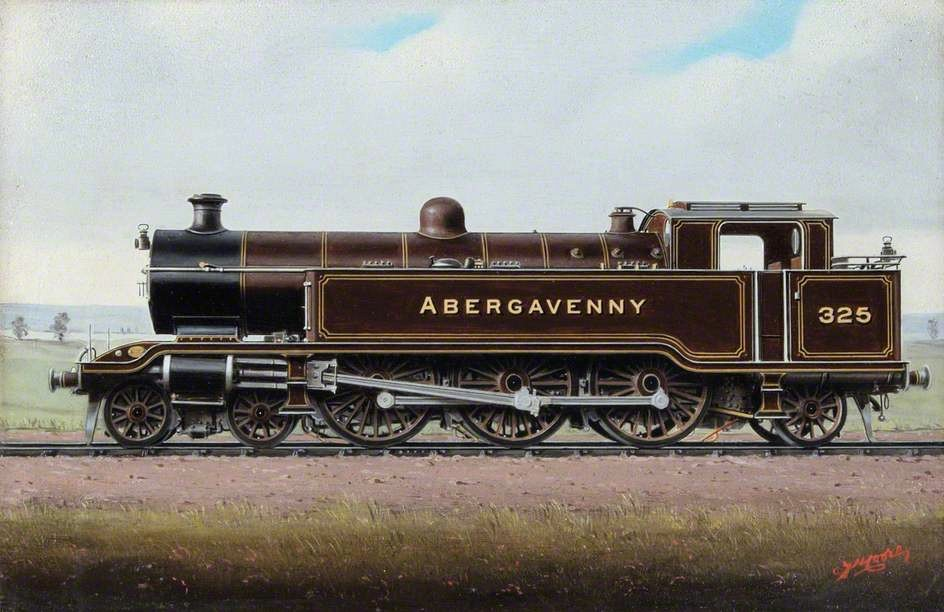
J1 class 4-6-2T locomotive 'Abergavenny'

Class	Wheel arrangement	Date	No. built	Loco Nos.
H1	4-4-2	1905-6	5	37-41
C3	0-6-0	1906	10	300-309
I1	4-4-2T	1906-7	20	1-10,595-604
I2	4-4-2T	1907-8	10	11-20
I3	4-4-2T	1907-13	27	21-30,75-91
I4	4-4-2T	1908	5	31-35
J1	4-6-2T	1910	1	325
H2	4-4-2	1911-2	6	421-6

- LB&SCR B2X class 4-4-0 introduced 1907 rebuild of B2
- LB&SCR C2X class 0-6-0 introduced 1908 rebuild of C2
- LB&SCR E4X class 0-6-2T introduced 1909 rebuild of E4
- LB&SCR A1X class 0-6-0T introduced 1911 rebuild of A1
- LB&SCR E5X class 0-6-2T introduced 1911 rebuild of E5
- LB&SCR E6X class 0-6-2T introduced 1911 rebuild of E6

==== L. B. Billinton (1911–1922) ====
Class	Wheel arrangement	Date	No. built	Loco Nos.
J2	4-6-2T	1912	1	326
E2	0-6-0T	1913-6	10	100-109
K	2-6-0	1913-21	17	337-353
L	4-6-4T	1914-22	7	327-333

- LB&SCR B4X class 4-4-0 introduced 1922 rebuild of B4
- LB&SCR I1X class 4-4-2T introduced 1923 rebuild of I1

Following the grouping, LB&SCR locomotive numbers were prefixed with "B", but in 1931 the prefix was removed and 2000 added to the number.

=== Minor companies ===
==== Plymouth, Devonport and South Western Junction Railway ====
PD&SWJ No.	Name	Wheel arrangement	SR No.	Manufacturer	Year made	Year withdrawn	Comments
3	A. S. Harris	0-6-0T	756	Hawthorn Leslie	1907	1951	
4	Earl of Mount Edgcumbe	0-6-2T	757	Hawthorn Leslie	1907	1956	
5	Lord St. Leven	0-6-2T	757	Hawthorn Leslie	1907	1958	

==== Freshwater, Yarmouth and Newport Railway ====
FY&N No.	Wheel arrangement	SR No.	Manufacturer	Year made	Year withdrawn	Comments
1	0-6-0T	W1	Manning Wardle	1902	1932	Acquired 1913
2	0-6-0T	W2	LBSCR Brighton Works	1876	1963	LB&SCR A1 class; acquired 1913; ex LSWR 734, ex LBSC 646, né LBSC 46

==== Isle of Wight Central Railway ====
IWCR No.	Name	Wheel arrangement	SR No.	Manufacturer	Year made	Year withdrawn	Comments
1 (1st)	Pioneer	2-2-2T	—	Slaughter, Grüning & Co.	1861	1904	
2 (1st)	Precursor	2-2-2T	—	Slaughter, Grüning & Co.	1861	1904	
1 (2nd)	—	0-4-0T	—	Hawthorn Leslie	1906	1918	
2 (2nd)	—	0-4-4T	—		1895	1917	Acquired 1909
3	Mill Hill	0-4-2T	—	Black, Hawthorn & Co.	1870	1918	
4	Cowes	2-4-0T	W4	Beyer, Peacock & Co.	1876	1925	
5	Osborne	2-4-0T	W5	Beyer, Peacock & Co.	1876	1926	
6 (1st)	Newport	2-2-2T	—	R. & W. Hawthorn & Co.	1861	1895	Acquired 1875
6 (2nd)	—	4-4-0T	W6	Black, Hawthorn & Co.	1890	1926	
7 (1st)	Whippingham	4-4-0T	—	Slaughter, Grüning & Co.	1861	1906	Acquired 1880
7 (2nd)	—	2-4-0T	W7	Beyer, Peacock & Co.	1882	1926	Acquired 1906
8	—	2-4-0T	W8	Beyer, Peacock & Co.	1898	1929	
9	—	0-6-0T	W9	LBSCR Brighton Works	1872	1927	LB&SCR A1 class; acquired 1899; ex LBSC 75
10	—	0-6-0T	W10	LBSCR Brighton Works	1874	1936	LB&SCR A1 class; acquired 1900; ex LBSC 669, né LBSC 69
11	—	0-6-0T	W11	LBSCR Brighton Works	1878	1963	LB&SCR A1 class; acquired 1902; ex LBSC 40
12	—	0-6-0T	W12	LBSCR Brighton Works	1880	1936	LB&SCR A1 class; acquired 1903; ex LBSC 84

==== Isle of Wight Railway ====
Name	Wheel arrangement	SR No.	Manufacturer	Year made	Year withdrawn	Comments
Ryde	2-4-0T	W13	Beyer, Peacock & Co.	1864	1932	
Sandown	2-4-0T	—	Beyer, Peacock & Co.	1864	1923	
Shanklin	2-4-0T	W14	Beyer, Peacock & Co.	1864	1927	
Ventnor	2-4-0T	W15	Beyer, Peacock & Co.	1868	1925	
Wroxhall	2-4-0T	W16	Beyer, Peacock & Co.	1872	1933	
Brading	2-4-0T	W17	Beyer, Peacock & Co.	1876	1926	
Bonchurch	2-4-0T	W18	Beyer, Peacock & Co.	1883	1928	
Bembridge	2-4-0T	—	Manning Wardle	1875	1917	

== Diesel and electric locomotives ==
=== Diesel shunters ===
- The Southern Railway built three diesel shunters in 1937, numbered 1–3. These became British Rail 15201–15203, and were later classified as British Rail Class D3/12.
- Twenty-six similar locomotives were built in 1949–1951 after nationalisation. They were numbered 15211–15236, and were later classified as British Rail Class 12.
- British Rail 11001, Southern Railway design, built 1949 at Ashford Works

=== Mainline diesels ===
- The Southern designed a prototype class of mainline diesel-electric locomotive. Three were built, although none were finished before nationalisation. They were numbered 10201–10203, and later classified as British Rail Class D16/2.

=== Electric shunters ===
- The Waterloo and City Railway (later acquired by the LSWR) had two electric shunting locomotives for its 500 V DC line. The first was of Bo wheel arrangement, built by Siemens Brothers & Co in 1893 later numbered 75S. The second was a Bo-Bo, built at Nine Elms Locomotive Works in 1899 and later numbered 74S.

=== Mainline electric ===
- The Southern Railway also built two mainline electric locomotives numbered CC1 and CC2. They were renumbered 20001 and 20002 after nationalisation. A third locomotive, 20003, was built in 1948. They were later classified as British Rail Class 70
