= List of locomotive classes =

This is a list of locomotive classes.

A list of locomotive classes that have a corresponding Wikipedia article. A locomotive or engine is a rail transport vehicle that provides the motive power for a train. If a locomotive is capable of carrying a payload, it is usually referred to as a multiple unit, motor coach, railcar or power car; the use of these self-propelled vehicles is increasingly common for passenger trains, but rare for freight (see CargoSprinter).

Following is a locomotive classes or models, organized by company. Note that some classes have only a single member, an individual locomotive which may also be included in List of locomotives.

== By country ==
=== Australia ===
- Australian diesels
- New South Wales steam
- Queensland steam
- Western Australia
- Victoria

== By company ==
=== American Locomotive Company ===
The American Locomotive Company (often shortened to ALCO, ALCo or Alco) was an American manufacturer of locomotives, diesel generators, steel, and tanks that operated from 1901 to 1969.

=== Baldwin Locomotive Works ===
The Baldwin Locomotive Works (BLW) was an American manufacturer of railroad locomotives from 1825 to 1951.

=== British Rail ===
British Rail is both a manufacturer and an operator of locomotives.

==== Steam ====
- BR Standard Class 9F
  - 92220 Evening Star

==== Diesel and electric ====
- British Rail Class 53
- British Rail Class 55

=== Bulgarian State Railways ===
The Bulgarian State Railways are Bulgaria's state railway company and the largest railway carrier in the country, established as an entity in 1888.

==== Diesel ====
- BDŽ class 75
- BDŽ class 76
- BDŽ class 77

=== Great Eastern Railway ===
Great Eastern Railway locomotives include:

- GER Class A55
- GER Class A55R
- GER Class B74
- GER Class C32
- GER Class C53
- GER Class C72
- GER Class D27
- GER Class G14
- GER Class G15
- GER Class S69

=== Great Western Railway ===
Great Western Railway locomotives include:

- Castle Class
- City Class
  - 3440 City of Truro
- Star Class
- The Great Bear

=== Indian Railways ===
Indian Railways locomotives include:

- Indian Locomotive Class WDM-2
- Indian locomotive class WAP-4
- Indian locomotive class WAP-5
- Indian locomotive class WAP-7
- Indian locomotive class WAG-9
- Indian locomotive class WDG-4
- Indian locomotive class WDP-4
- Indian locomotive class WAG-12
- Indian locomotives class WDG-4G

=== Ingalls Shipbuilding ===
Ingalls Shipbuilding locomotives include"

- Ingalls 4-S

=== Lima-Hamilton ===
- See List of Lima-Hamilton diesel locomotives

=== London and North Eastern Railway ===
London and North Eastern Railway locomotives include:

- LNER Class A3
  - 4472 Flying Scotsman
- LNER Class A4
  - 4468 Mallard
  - 4488 Union of South Africa

=== London, Brighton and South Coast Railway ===
London, Brighton and South Coast Railway locomotives include:

- LB&SCR A1 Class
- LB&SCR B1 Class
- LB&SCR B2 class
- LB&SCR B4 Class
- LB&SCR C class
- LB&SCR C1 Class
- LB&SCR C2 Class
- LB&SCR C3 class
- LB&SCR D1 class
- LB&SCR D2 class
- LB&SCR D3 class
- LB&SCR E1 Class
- LB&SCR E2 Class
- LB&SCR E3 Class
- LB&SCR E4 Class
- LB&SCR E5 class
- LB&SCR E6 class
- LB&SCR G class
- LB&SCR H1 class
- LB&SCR H2 class
- LB&SCR I1 class
- LB&SCR I2 class
- LB&SCR I3 class
- LB&SCR K Class
- LB&SCR L Class

=== Montreal Locomotive Works ===
Montreal Locomotive Works locomotives include:

- Selkirk locomotive

=== New Zealand Railways ===
New Zealand Railways locomotives include:

- A class of 1873
- A class of 1906
- A^{A} class
- A^{B} class
- B class of 1874
- B class of 1899
- B^{A} class
- B^{B} class
- B^{C} class
- C class of 1873
- C class of 1930
- DA class
- DB class
- DC class
- DE class
- DF class of 1954
- DF class of 1979
- DG class
- DH class
- DI class
- DJ class
- DL class
- DQ class
- DX class
- E class of 1872
- E class of 1906
- E class of 1922
- EB class
- EF class
- EO class of 1923
- EW class
- F class
- G class
- H class
- J class of 1874
- J class of 1939
- K class of 1877
- K class of 1932
- K^{A} class
- K^{B} class
- L^{A} class
- N class
- N^{A} class
- N^{C} class
- O class
- O^{A} class
- O^{B} class
- O^{C} class
- P class of 1876
- P class of 1885
- Q class
- R class
- T class
- W^{AB} class
- W^{B} class
- W^{D} class
- W^{F} class
- X class

=== Norfolk and Western Railway ===
Norfolk and Western Railway locomotives include:

- Norfolk & Western 611
- Norfolk and Western 1218
- A Class
- J Class (1941)
- M Class
- M1 Class
- M2 Class
- TE Class
- Y3 Class
- Y3a Class
- Y Class
- Y6a Class
- Y6b Class

=== Norwegian State Railways ===
Norwegian State Railways locomotives include:

- NSB Class XXI
- NSB Class XXII
