= LB&SCR E6 class =

Class of British steam locomotives

LB&SCR E6 and E6X classes
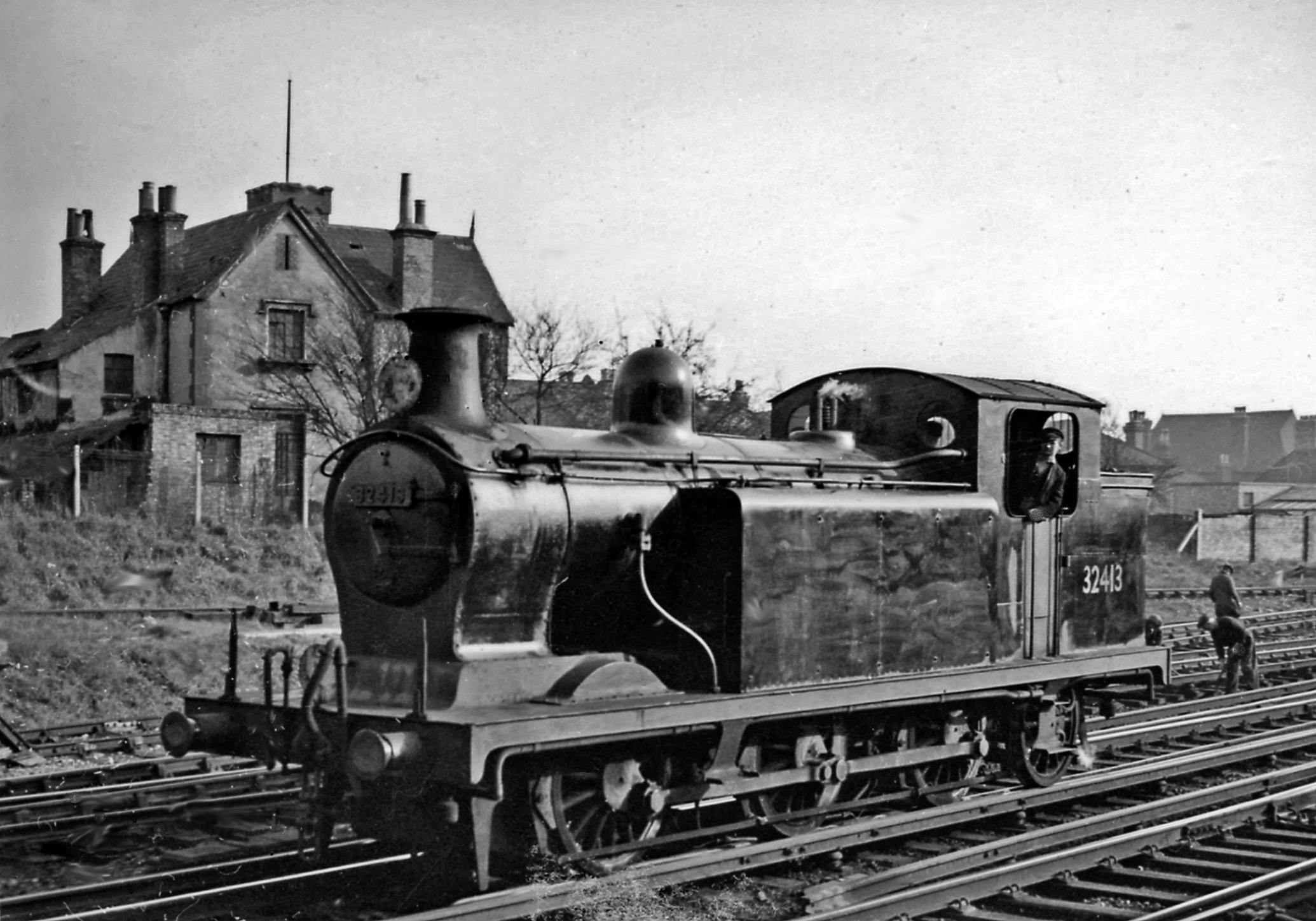
- 32413 at Norwood Junction 1958
Type and origin
- Power type: Steam
- Designer: R. J. Billinton
- Builder: Brighton railway works
- Build date: 1904–1905
- Total produced: 12
Specifications
- Configuration
  - Whyte: 0-6-2T
- Gauge: 4 ft 8 1/2 in (1,435 mm) standard gauge
- Driver dia.: 4 ft 6 in (1.372 m)
- Loco weight: E6: 61 long tons (62 t; 68 short tons); E6X: 63 long tons (64 t; 71 short tons)
- Fuel type: Coal
- Firebox
  - Grate area: 19 sq ft (1.765 m^{2})
- Boiler pressure: E6: 160 psi (11.03 bar; 1.10 MPa); E6X: 170 psi (11.72 bar; 1.17 MPa)
- Cylinders: Two, inside
- Cylinder size: 18 in × 26 in (457 mm × 660 mm)
Performance figures
- Tractive effort: E6: 21,215 lbf (94.4 kN); E6X: 22,540 lbf (100.3 kN)
Career
- Class: E6, E6x
- Power class: BR: 3F
- Withdrawn: 1957–1962
- Disposition: All scrapped

The London, Brighton and South Coast Railway E6 class was a class of 0-6-2T side tank steam locomotive designed by R. J. Billinton. They were introduced in 1904 and were a development of the E5 class with smaller driving wheels intended for heavy short and medium-distance freight trains.

== History ==
The E3 class radial tanks were useful on all but the heaviest freight trains in the congested London area, which required rapid acceleration from signals in order to avoid holding up other traffic. Billinton therefore produced a version of his successful E5 passenger tank class with smaller 4 ft 6 in (1.372 m) driving wheels for this purpose. Twelve locomotives were built by Brighton Works between December 1904 and December 1905. The last two locomotives were originally intended to be built as 0-8-0s for heavy shunting purposes but Billinton died in November 1904 before any were built and the order was subsequently changed by his successor D. E. Marsh.

The E6s were successful goods locomotives, but in 1911 two examples were rebuilt with the larger C3 class boiler and a C2X class smokebox and were re-classified E6X. These two locomotives proved to be very powerful, but used significantly more fuel and no more examples were rebuilt.

All of the class survived the transfer to Southern Railway ownership in 1923, and British Railways ownership in 1948. Withdrawal commenced in September 1957 and was completed by December 1962. No examples have been preserved.

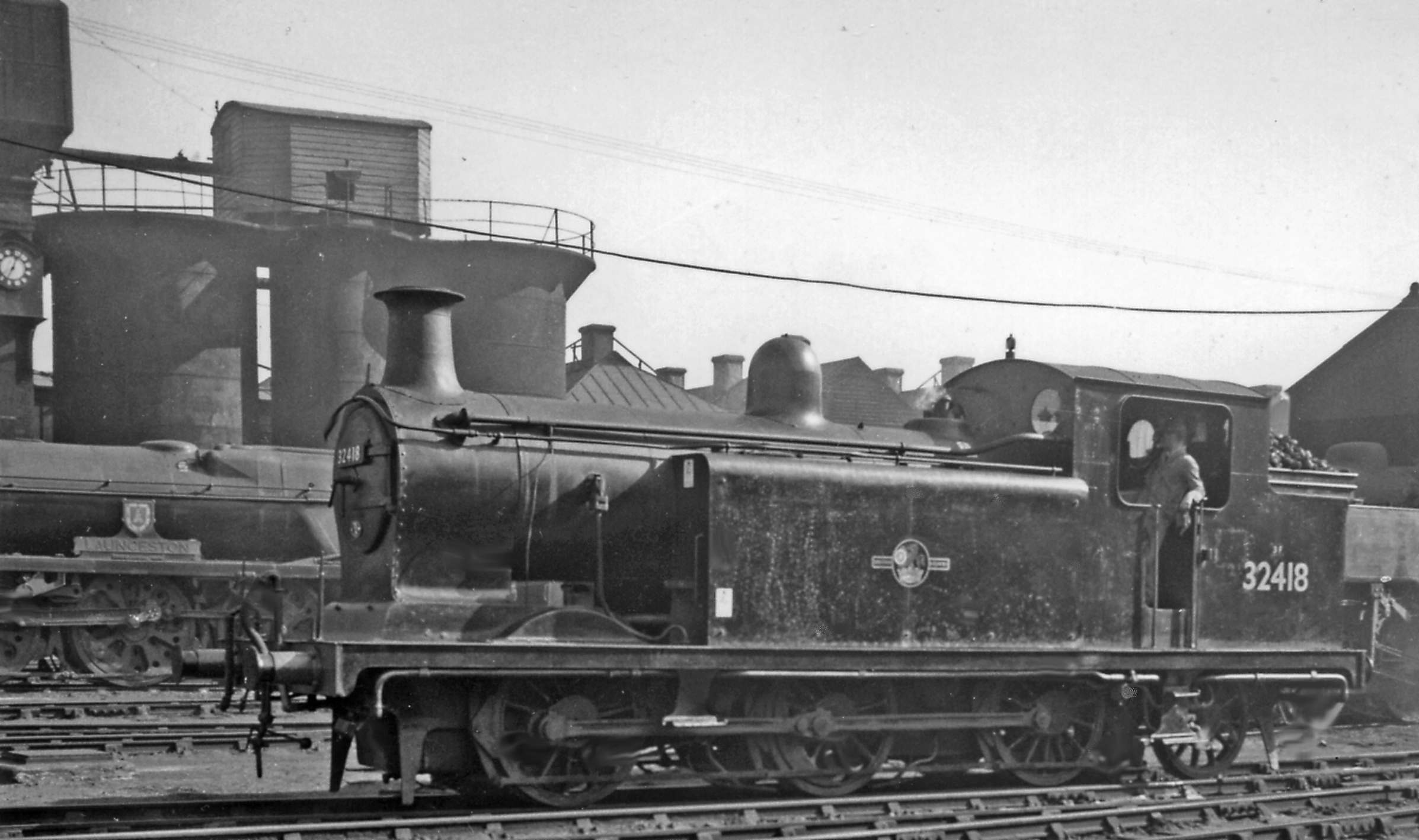
No. 32418 at Brighton Locomotive Depot 7 October 1962

== Numbering ==
British Railways (BR) numbers were 32407-32418. The E6X locomotives were 32407 and 32411.

== Sources ==
- Bradley, D.L. (1974). Locomotives of the London Brighton and South Coast Railway, Part 3. Railway Correspondence and Travel Society.
