= LB&SCR B2 class =

LB&SCR B2, B2X and B3 classes
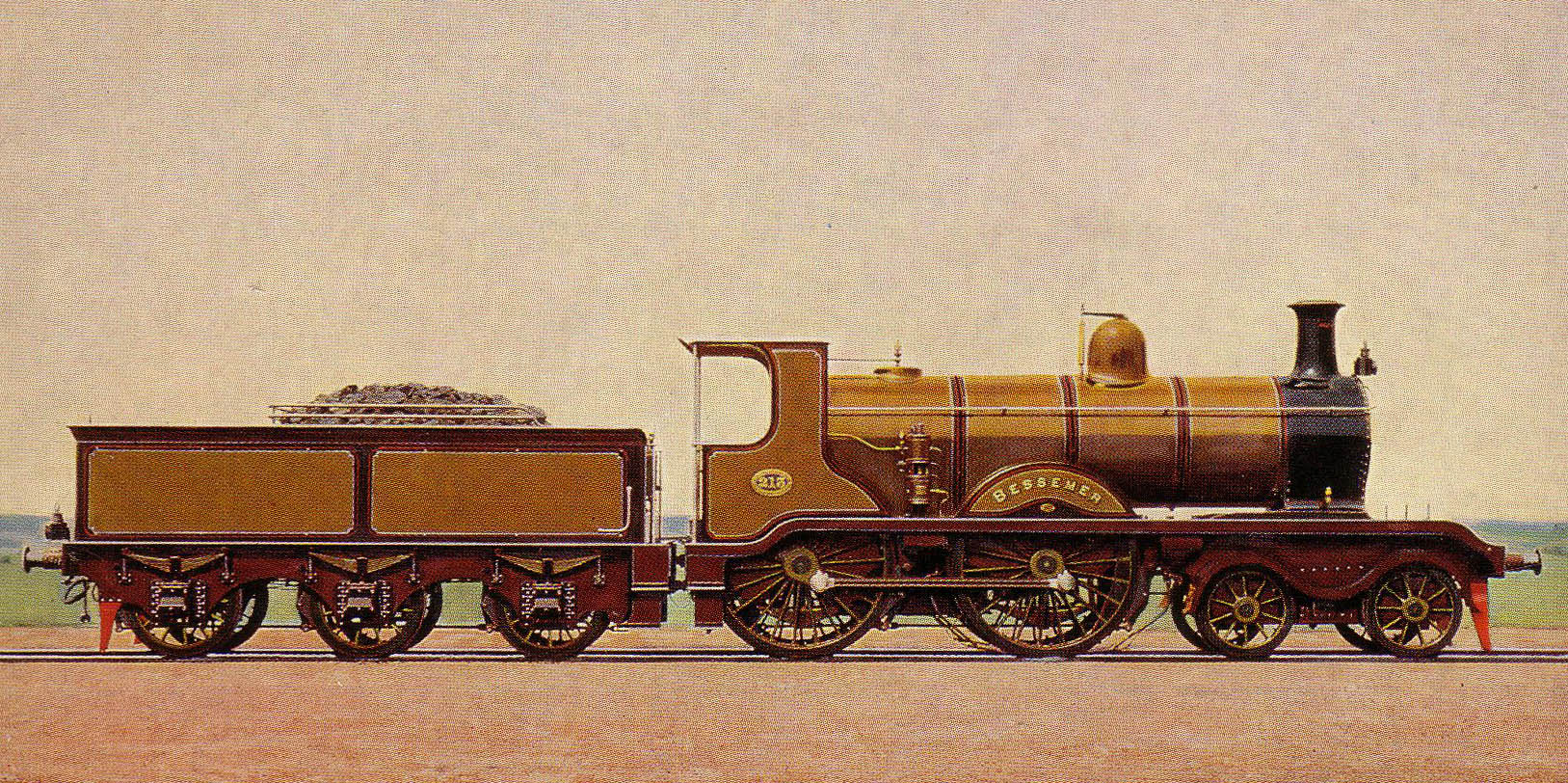
- B3 class No. 213 Bessemer as built
Type and origin
- Power type: Steam
- Designer: R. J. Billinton
- Builder: Brighton Works
- Build date: 1895–1898
- Total produced: 25
- Rebuild date: 1907–1916
Specifications
- Configuration
  - Whyte: 4-4-0
  - UIC: 2'Bn
- Gauge: 4 ft 8 1/2 in (1,435 mm) standard gauge
- Leading dia.: 3 ft 6 in (1.067 m)
- Driver dia.: 6 ft 9 in (2.057 m)
- Total weight: B2: 76 long tons 15 cwt (78.0 t); B3: 78 long tons 4 cwt (79.5 t)
- Fuel type: Coal
- Boiler pressure: 160 psi (11.03 bar; 1.10 MPa)
- Cylinders: Two, inside
- Cylinder size: 18 in × 26 in (457 mm × 660 mm)
Performance figures
- Tractive effort: B2 14,144 lbf (62.9 kN); B2X 15,028 lbf (66.8 kN)
Career
- Class: B2, B3, B2x
- Withdrawn: 1929–1933
- Disposition: All Scrapped

The London, Brighton and South Coast Railway (LB&SCR) B2 class was a class of small 4-4-0 steam locomotives intended for express passenger work on the LB&SCR London to Portsmouth line. They were designed by R. J. Billinton and built at Brighton works from 1895 to 1897. They proved to be reliable locomotives but barely adequate for the heaviest trains and acquired the nickname Grasshoppers. As a result the B3 class was developed from the B2, and the B2X class was later rebuilt from these locomotives with larger boilers.

== History ==
When R. J. Billinton took over as chief mechanical engineer of the LB&SCR in 1890, following the sudden death of William Stroudley, the London to Brighton trains were adequately served by Stroudley's Gladstone class but the lighter Portsmouth expresses were beginning to struggle behind his G class singles. Billinton therefore designed a small 4-4-0, specifically for these services. However, during the course of 1892-1893 the London-to-Brighton trains began to increase in weight, and the board of governors of the railway agreed to invest money in larger turntables and so Billinton was able to enlarge his design further to make them more generally useful.

Three locomotives appeared in 1895, with a further eight in 1896 and fourteen in 1897. They were named after famous politicians, bankers and railway engineers. The new design was clearly influenced by the locomotives of Samuel Waite Johnson on the Midland Railway, for whom Billinton had previously worked, and were the first LB&SCR locomotives to have leading bogie wheels. It incorporated Billinton's C2 class boiler. They proved to be adequate for the lightly loaded Portsmouth express trains but barely so for heavier trains. They also tended to ride unevenly and consequently acquired the nickname of grasshoppers by their crews.

=== B3 and B2X classes ===
As a result of the complaints about the use of the class on the Brighton line, Billinton fitted the last locomotive in the class No. 213 Bessemer, with a larger boiler when new, which thereafter became known as the B3 class. This caused a slight improvement in performance but not one significant enough to alter the entire class at that time. However, once the original boilers were worn out, it became more of an economic proposition to do so. Thus between October 1907 and 1910, Billinton's successor Douglas Earle Marsh rebuilt the entire class (including 213 Bessemer) with the improved boiler used on his C3 class, thereby creating the B2X class.

The rebuilt locomotives were a significant improvement in both looks and performance and were used on the heaviest expresses to Portsmouth and Hastings and semi-fast trains on the Brighton line.

=== Post-grouping ===
All 25 locomotives were still in regular use in December 1922, at the grouping of the railways of southern England to form the Southern Railway. The class continued to find useful work on secondary passenger services between London and the south coast until 1929, when the impending electrification of the Brighton line began to make them redundant. They were thus all withdrawn between June 1929 and March 1933, and none have survived in preservation.

=== Accidents and incidents ===
- On 9 July 1928, B2X locomotive No. B210 was in a sidelong collision with an electric multiple unit at London Bridge due to the driver misreading signals. Two people were killed and nine were injured, six seriously.

== Locomotive summary ==
LB&SCR no.	Build date	Rebuilt B2x	LBSCR name	Renamed/date	SR no.	Date withdrawn
171	June 1897	August 1910	Nevill	-	2171	May 1931
201	January 1897	January 1909	Rosebery	-	2201	1930
202	February 1897	1909	Trevithick	-	2202	September 1931
203	March 1897	February 1909	Henry Fletcher	-	2203	October 1930
204	March 1897	March 1911	Telford	-	2204	July 1929
205	April 1897	March 1910	Hackworth	-	2205	November 1931
206	April 1897	January 1909	Smeaton	-	2206	March 1933
207	June 1897	July 1909	Brunel	-	2207	October 1931
208	August 1897	January 1911	Abercorn	-	2208	June 1929
209	September 1897	April 1913	Wolfe Barry	-	2209	September 1930
210	October 1897	February 1909	Fairbairn	-	2210	July 1931
211	November 1897	June 1910	Whitworth	-	2211	October 1930
212	January 1898	February 1910	Armstrong	-	2212	July 1930
213	January 1898	November 1908	Bessemer	-	2213	April 1932
314	June 1895	April 1911	Charles C. Macrae	-	2314	April 1930
315	June 1895	March 1909	Duncannon	J. Gay	2315	April 1933
316	June 1895	July 1916	Goldsmid	-	2316	1930
317	June 1896	October 1908	Gerald Loder	-	2317	June 1929
318	June 1896	July 1910	Rothschild	-	2318	July 1930
319	September 1896	June 1914	John Fowler	Leconfield	2319	April 1930
320	September 1896	July 1910	Rastrick	-	2320	1932
321	September 1896	October 1907	John Rennie	-	2321	September 1930
322	September 1896	September 1908	G.P. Bidder	-	2322	June 1931
323	December 1896	September 1908	William Cubitt	-	2323	November 1932
324	January 1897	May 1913	John Hawkshaw	-	2324	1932
