= D. E. Marsh =

English railway engineer (1862–1933)

- Born: Douglas Earle Marsh; 4 January 1862; Aylsham, Norfolk, United Kingdom of Great Britain and Ireland
- Died: May 1933; Bath, Somerset, United Kingdom
- Education: Brighton College
- Alma mater: University College, London
- Occupation: Railway engineer
- Years active: 1888-1911
- Era: Long nineteenth century
- Employer(s): GWR, GNR, LB&SCR, and Rio Tinto

Douglas Earle Marsh (1862–1933) was an English railway engineer, and was the Locomotive, Carriage and Wagon Superintendent of the London, Brighton and South Coast Railway from November 1904 until his early retirement on health grounds in July 1911.

== Early career ==
Marsh was born at Aylsham, Norfolk on 4 January 1862, and was educated at Brighton College and University College London. He worked for the Great Western Railway under William Dean becoming an Assistant Works Manager at Swindon in 1888. In 1896 he became Chief Assistant Mechanical Engineer of the Great Northern Railway at Doncaster railway works under H.A. Ivatt, where he participated in the design of the Ivatt Atlantics.

== LB&SCR ==
Marsh succeeded R. J. Billinton as the Locomotive, Carriage and Wagon Superintendent at Brighton Works on 23 November 1904. Marsh's locomotive classes included two designs of Atlantic 4-4-2 (H1 Class and H2 Class), and four designs of 4-4-2T (I1, I2, I3, and I4). In 1910 he designed two 4-6-2T tank locomotives of the J1 and J2 classes. His least successful design was the LB&SCR C3 class 0-6-0 freight locomotives.

Marsh also rebuilt many of his predecessors' locomotives with larger boilers thereby creating the A1X, B2X, C2X, E4X, E5X and E6X classes. In 1907 he introduced an example of the Schmidt superheater on one of his LB&SCR I3 class locomotives, with dramatically improved results. Whilst at Brighton he abolished the Stroudley yellow livery for passenger locomotives and removed the names from them.

During Marsh's period in office Brighton railway works built up a serious backlog of locomotives awaiting repair, and by 1910 30% of the locomotive stock was unusable. Marsh received much of the blame for this, although it was partly because the works was overwhelmed at the time.

== Resignation and retirement ==
Marsh was never popular within the workforce at Brighton. He resigned on the grounds of deteriorating health in July 1911, following accusations of a number of irregularities in his accounting. Shortly after his resignation he became a consulting engineer for the Rio Tinto Company until 1932. He died in Bath in May 1933.

== Patents ==
- GB191028252, published 30 November 1911, Improvements in and relating to systems and apparatus for washing out and filling locomotive boilers and the like

== Sources ==
- D.L. Bradley, Locomotives of the LB&SCR, Parts II. and III. Railway Correspondence and Travel Society, 1972.

, 1978.

- Klaus Marx, Douglas Earle Marsh: his life and times. Oakwood Press, 2005.

Business positions
Preceded by R. J. Billinton	Locomotive, Carriage and Wagon Superintendent of the London, Brighton and South Coast Railway; 1905–1911	Succeeded by L. B. Billinton as Locomotive Superintendent
Preceded by R. J. Billinton	Locomotive, Carriage and Wagon Superintendent of the London, Brighton and South Coast Railway; 1905–1911	Succeeded by Albert Panter as Carriage and Wagon Superintendent
