= LB&SCR I3 class =

Class of steam tank locomotives

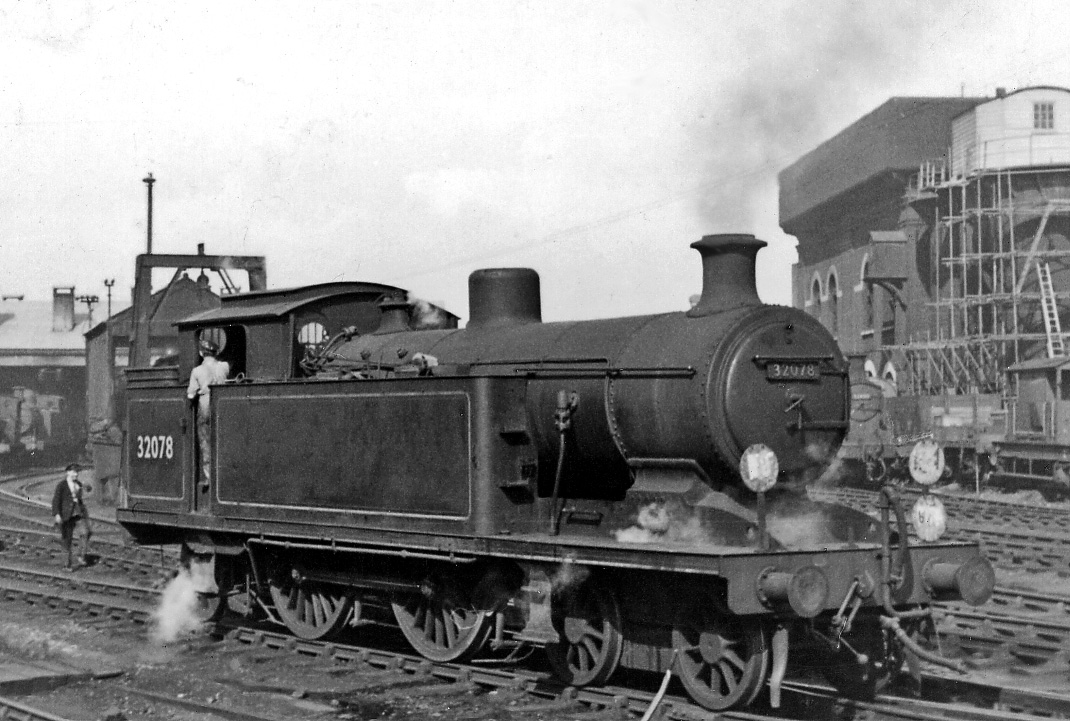
- I3 class 32078 at Brighton 19 March 1950
Type and origin
- Power type: Steam
- Designer: D.E. Marsh
- Builder: Brighton Works
- Build date: 1907–1913
- Total produced: 27
Specifications
- Configuration
  - Whyte: 4-4-2T
  - UIC: 2′B1 n2t
- Gauge: 4 ft 8 1/2 in (1,435 mm) standard gauge
- Leading dia.: 3 ft 6 in (1.067 m)
- Driver dia.: 6 ft 9 in (2.057 m)
- Trailing dia.: 4 ft 0 in (1.219 m)
- Loco weight: 73 long tons (74.2 t; 81.8 short tons) saturated; 74 long tons (75.2 t; 82.9 short tons) superheated
- Fuel type: Coal
- Fuel capacity: 3 long tons (3.0 t; 3.4 short tons)
- Water cap.: 2,110 imp gal (9,600 L; 2,530 US gal)
- Boiler pressure: Saturated: 180 psi (1.24 MPa); Superheated: 160 psi (1.10 MPa)
- Cylinders: Two, inside
- Cylinder size: 19 in × 26 in (483 mm × 660 mm)
Performance figures
- Tractive effort: Saturated: 16,700 lbf (74.3 kN); Superheated: 22,100 lbf (98.3 kN)
Career
- Operators: London Brighton and South Coast Railway; Southern Railway; British Railways
- Class: I3
- Power class: GWR: C; BR: 3P
- Axle load class: GWR: Red
- Withdrawn: 1944 (1), 1950–1952
- Disposition: All scrapped

The LB&SCR I3 class was a class of 4-4-2 steam tank locomotives designed by D. E. Marsh for suburban passenger service on the London, Brighton and South Coast Railway.

== History ==
After introducing two unsuccessful designs of 4-4-2 tank locomotive with the I1 and I2 classes, Douglas Earle Marsh learned a lesson and provided a new design with a far larger firebox. The new design was a tank version of Robert Billinton's successful B4 class tender locomotives. At the time of its introduction locomotive engineers were beginning to take an interest in superheating and Marsh therefore ordered two locomotives from Brighton railway works for comparative purposes, one with a traditional saturated boiler and one incorporating the Schmidt superheater. These were built in October 1907 and March 1908 respectively.

Several months of trials proved that both locomotives were performing well and reliably, but the LB&SCR Board of Directors were still not convinced that the extra building costs associated with superheating was matched by lower running costs. Marsh therefore built four more superheated locomotives and six without superheating, between February 1909 and March 1910. By mid 1910, there was sufficient operating data to convince the Directors and all after this date were superheated. Five more locomotives appeared in 1910.

Both varieties of the I3 class proved themselves to be excellent locomotives but the superheated versions were significantly cheaper to run on express trains, especially when compared with the B4 and H1 classes. The class were also used experimentally on through express trains with the London and North Western Railway between Brighton and Rugby and convinced the LNWR directors of the value of superheating. Ten more superheated I3s were constructed in 1912 under Lawson Billinton, with minor detail differences.

After World War I, Billinton wished to convert the remaining members of the class to superheating as their boilers came due for renewal, but only the prototype No. 21 was converted before the LB&SCR merged with other railways to form Southern Railway in January 1923. The remainder were converted by Richard Maunsell between 1925 and 1927 using his own design of superheater.

During 1925 and 1926, the I3 class were gradually replaced on the London-Brighton express trains by the "King Arthur" and "River" classes, and they were transferred on to semi-fast and other secondary services. However, the electrification of the London to Brighton and London to Portsmouth lines during the 1930s meant that the class were transferred further afield on the Southern Railway including Salisbury and Dover. Between the Autumn of 1941 and the summer of 1943 two I3 locomotives were loaned to the Great Western Railway and performed well on services from Gloucester, and Worcester.

== Accidents and incidents ==
- On 21 January 1947, locomotive No. 2028 was hauling an empty stock train which was in a rear-end collision with an electric multiple unit at South Bermondsey, London.
- On 7 December 1948, locomotive No. 2028 was travelling light from Tunbridge Wells towards London through Mark Beach tunnel (between Cowden and Hever) when one of the large smoke tubes collapsed. The driver was seriously scalded.

== Withdrawals ==
The first worn-out member of the class was withdrawn by the Southern Railway in 1944, but the remainder survived into British Railways (BR) ownership in 1948, although all were withdrawn between January 1950 and May 1952, having all completed very high mileages. No examples have been preserved.

== Numbering ==
The first ten were numbered 21-30 and the remainder 75-91. The Southern Railway initially added a "B" prefix to these numbers and later renumbered them 2021-2030 and 2075-2091. BR added 30000 to the numbers.

== Sources ==
- Bradley, D.L. (1974). Locomotives of the London Brighton and South Coast Railway: Part 3. Railway Correspondence and Travel Society.
- Report on the accident which occurred on 7th December 1948, between Cowden and Hever in the Southern Region British Railways. His Majesty's Stationery Office.
