= LB&SCR G class =

London Brighton and South Coast Railway Class G
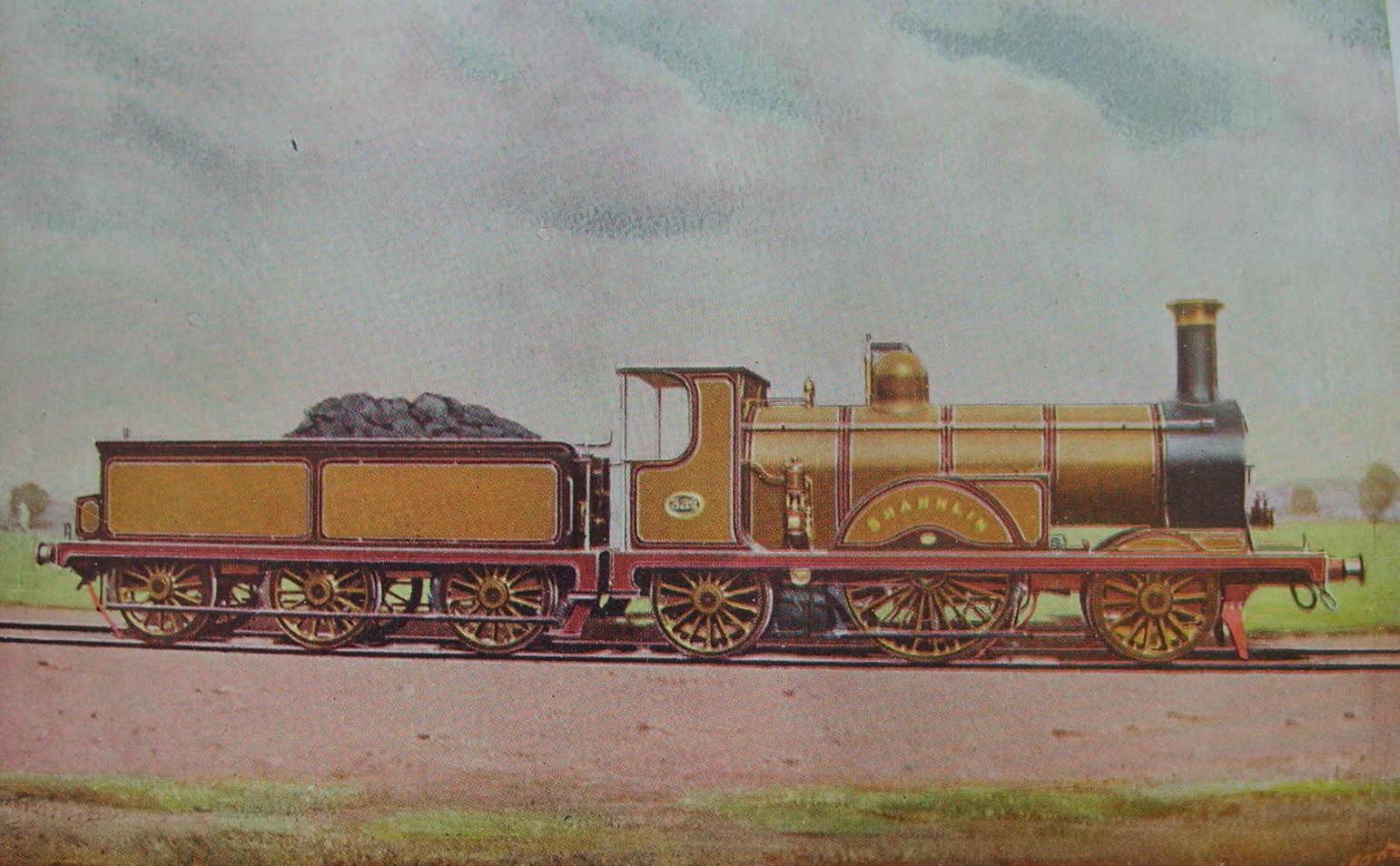
- Stroudley 'G' class single
Type and origin
- Power type: Steam
- Designer: William Stroudley
- Build date: 1874–1882
- Total produced: Grosvenor: 1 Abergavenny: 1 remainder: 24
Specifications
- Configuration
  - Whyte: 2-2-2
- Gauge: 4 ft 8 1/2 in (1,435 mm) standard gauge
- Driver dia.: Grosvenor: 6 ft 9 in (2,057 mm); Remainder: 6 ft 6 in (1,981 mm)
- Trailing dia.: 4 ft 6 in (1,372 mm)
- Wheelbase: 15 ft 9 in (4.80 m)
- Adhesive weight: 14 LT (14.2 t; 15.7 short tons)
- Loco weight: 35.6 LT (36.2 t; 39.9 short tons) (Grosvenor as built); 34.2 LT (34.7 t; 38.3 short tons) (Abergavenny); 33.4 LT (33.9 t; 37.4 short tons) (remainder)
- Firebox
  - Grate area: 17 sq ft (1.6 m^{2})
- Boiler pressure: 150 lbf/in^{2} (10 bar; 1,034 kPa)
- Heating surface
  - Tubes: 1,022 sq ft (94.9 m^{2})
  - Total surface: 1,132 sq ft (105.2 m^{2})(Grosvenor as built); 1,077 sq ft (100.1 m^{2})(Abergavenny); 1,200 sq ft (110 m^{2}) (remainder)
- Cylinders: 2
- Cylinder size: 17 in × 24 in (432 mm × 610 mm)
- Loco brake: Steam operated wooden block brakes
Career
- Operators: London, Brighton and South Coast Railway
- Class: G
- Locale: Great Britain
- First run: 1874
- Withdrawn: 1907-1914
- Disposition: All scrapped

The LB&SCR G class were powerful 2-2-2 locomotives, designed by William Stroudley of the London, Brighton and South Coast Railway in 1874.

== History ==
A prototype single locomotive, No. 151 Grosvenor, was designed by Stroudley and produced by Brighton railway works in December 1874. This was extensively tested before a second, scaled down locomotive No. 325 Abergavenny, was ordered in June 1876 and completed in January 1877. Both locomotives performed adequately, but Abergavenny was significantly less powerful than Grosvenor. A modified design was developed and twelve further locomotives were built between December 1880 and November 1881. The members of this class worked express trains between London and South Coast towns such as Portsmouth, Brighton and Eastbourne, and covered large mileages. The introduction of the Billinton B2 class made the singles redundant on the Portsmouth line and so several were transferred to Tunbridge Wells.

Withdrawals began in May 1907, and the last locomotive survived until May 1914. No examples have been preserved, but there is a model of No. 331 Fairlight in the museum at Sheffield Park on the Bluebell Railway.

== Locomotive summary ==
G class fleet summary
LBSC No.	Date Built	New No.	Date	Name	Withdrawn
151	December 1874	326	December 1880	Grosvenor	May 1907
325	January 1877			Abergavenny	June 1909
327	December 1880			Imberhorne	April 1910
328	February 1881			Sutherland	April 1908
329	May 1881	329A	December 1909	Stephenson	May 1914
330	June 1881			Newhaven	November 1908
331	July 1881			Fairlight	February 1909
332	July 1881			Shanklin	March 1910
333	August 1881			Ventnor	November 1908
334	July 1881			Petworth	November 1908
335	October 1881			Connaught	May 1907
336	October 1881			Edinburgh	May 1907
337	October 1881			Yarmouth	June 1908
338	November 1881			Bembridge	July 1908
339	December 1881			London	November 1908
340	December 1881			Medina	November 1908
341	January 1882			Parkhurst	June 1907
342	January 1882			St Lawrence	January 1911
343	January 1882			Wilmington	June 1907
344	January 1882			Hurstmonceux	November 1908
345	March 1882			Plumpton	January 1911
346	April 1882			Alfriston	November 1908
347	April 1882			Dallington	June 1908
348	April 1882			Lullington	July 1908
349	May 1882			Albany	March 1910
350	May 1882			Southbourne	July 1908

== Sources ==
- Bradley, D.L. (1969). The locomotives of the London, Brighton & South Coast Railway: Part 1. The Railway Correspondence and Travel Society.
- Ahrons, E.L. (1927). The British Steam Railway Locomotive from 1825 to 1925. London Locomotive Publishing Co. Ltd. p. 187.
