= British Rail 11001 =

Diesel-mechanical railway locomotive used in Great Britain

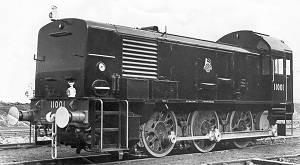
- 11001
Type and origin
- Power type: Diesel-mechanical
- Builder: BR Ashford railway works
- Order number: 3410
- Build date: 1 February 1949
- Total produced: 1
Specifications
- Configuration
  - Whyte: 0-6-0DM
  - UIC: C
- Gauge: 4 ft 8 1/2 in (1,435 mm) standard gauge
- Wheel diameter: 4 ft 6 in (1.372 m)
- Length: 33 ft 3 in (10.13 m)
- Loco weight: 49.45 long tons (50.24 t; 55.38 short tons)
- Prime mover: Paxman RPH Series 1
- Transmission: Mechanical, SSS Powerflow 3-speed gearbox
- Train heating: None
Performance figures
- Maximum speed: 45 mph (72 km/h)
- Power output: Engine: 500 bhp (373 kW)
- Tractive effort: 33,500 lbf (149.0 kN)
Career
- Operators: British Railways
- Numbers: 11001
- Axle load class: Route availability
- Retired: 8 August 1959
- Disposition: Scrapped at Ashford Works on 31 December 1959

11001 was one of the first British Railways diesel locomotives, built in 1949 at British Railways' Ashford railway works. It was designed by Oliver Bulleid when he was Chief Mechanical Engineer of the Southern Railway. It was powered by a Paxman RPH Series 1 engine, capable of delivering 500 brake horsepower (370 kW) at 1,250 rpm. It was driven via a Vulcan-Sinclair fluid coupling to an SSS (synchro-self-shifting) Powerflow gearbox. The gearbox provided three forward and reverse gears in either high or low range, with top speed ranging from 5 mph (8 km/h) in 1st gear, low range up to 36 mph (58 km/h). It had a 0-6-0 wheel formation, driven by rods from a rear jackshaft on the final drive, and with Bulleid's favoured BFB wheels.

Its main duties were on branch lines and shunting around Norwood Junction, working goods services on the Caterham line during the 1950s. During 1952, it was trialled at Stourton marshalling yard in Leeds. Following a gearbox failure in 1958, it was stored at Ashford, before withdrawal in August 1959. It was cut up at Ashford in December 1959.
