= LB&SCR E5 class =

English class of 0-6-2T steam locomotives

LB&SCR E5 and E5X classes
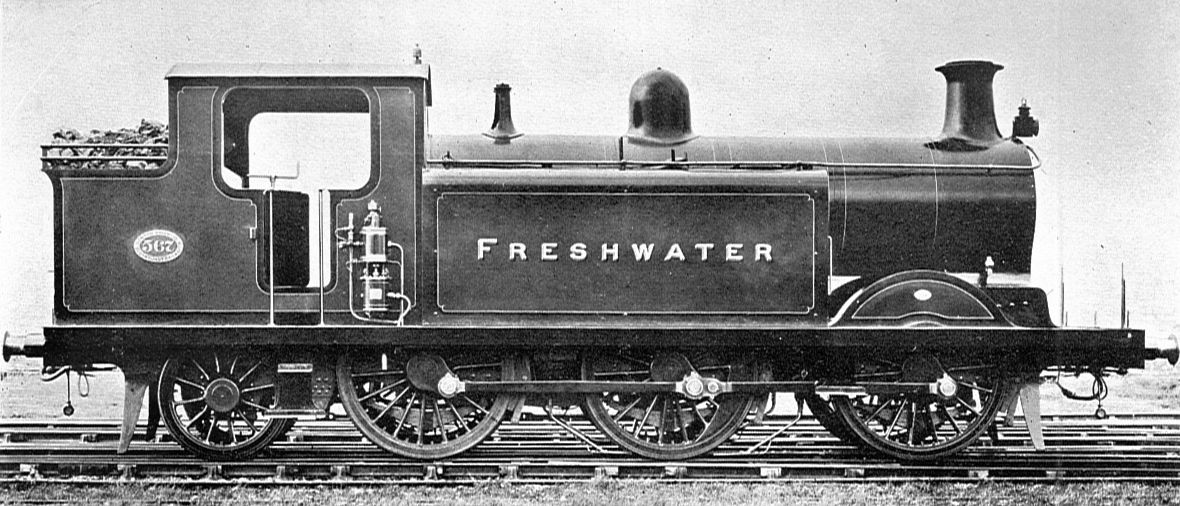
- E5 No. 567 Freshwater
Type and origin
- Power type: Steam
- Designer: R. J. Billinton
- Builder: Brighton Works
- Build date: 1902–1904
- Total produced: 30
Specifications
- Configuration
  - Whyte: 0-6-2T
- Gauge: 4 ft 8 1/2 in (1,435 mm) standard gauge
- Driver dia.: 5 ft 6 in (1.676 m)
- Loco weight: E5: 58 long tons 0 cwt (129,900 lb or 58.9 t) to 57 long tons 10 cwt (128,800 lb or 58.4 t) (64.9 to 64.4 short tons); E5X: 64 long tons 5 cwt (143,900 lb or 65.3 t) (72.0 short tons)
- Fuel type: Coal
- Fuel capacity: 3 long tons 10 cwt (7,800 lb or 3.6 t)
- Boiler pressure: E5: 160 psi (1.10 MPa); E5X: 170 psi (1.17 MPa)
- Cylinders: Two, inside
- Cylinder size: 18 in × 26 in (457 mm × 660 mm)
Performance figures
- Tractive effort: E5: 17,355 lbf (77.2 kN); E5x: 18,440 lbf (82.0 kN)
Career
- Class: E5, E5x
- Power class: BR: 2MT
- Withdrawn: 1936–1956
- Disposition: All scrapped

The London, Brighton and South Coast Railway E5 class was a class of 0-6-2T side tank steam locomotive designed by Robert Billinton. They were introduced in 1902 and were a larger version of the E4 Class intended for semi-fast secondary passenger work.

== History ==
As the weight of passenger trains continued to grow steadily during the 1890s and 1900s Robert Billinton decided to enlarge his radial tank classes still further by introducing a 5-foot-6-inch (1.676 m) wheeled version incorporating the C2 class boiler. Thirty E5 locomotives were built by Brighton Works between November 1902 and November 1904. In addition to more power and a higher top speed, they also had more fuel capacity than the E4 class.

The E5s were deemed to be fairly successful and locomotives achieved high mileages, but in 1911 four examples were rebuilt by D. E. Marsh with the larger C3 class boiler and were re-classified E5X. This experiment was not however a success and the performance was not greatly improved and higher centre of gravity made for rougher running at speed.

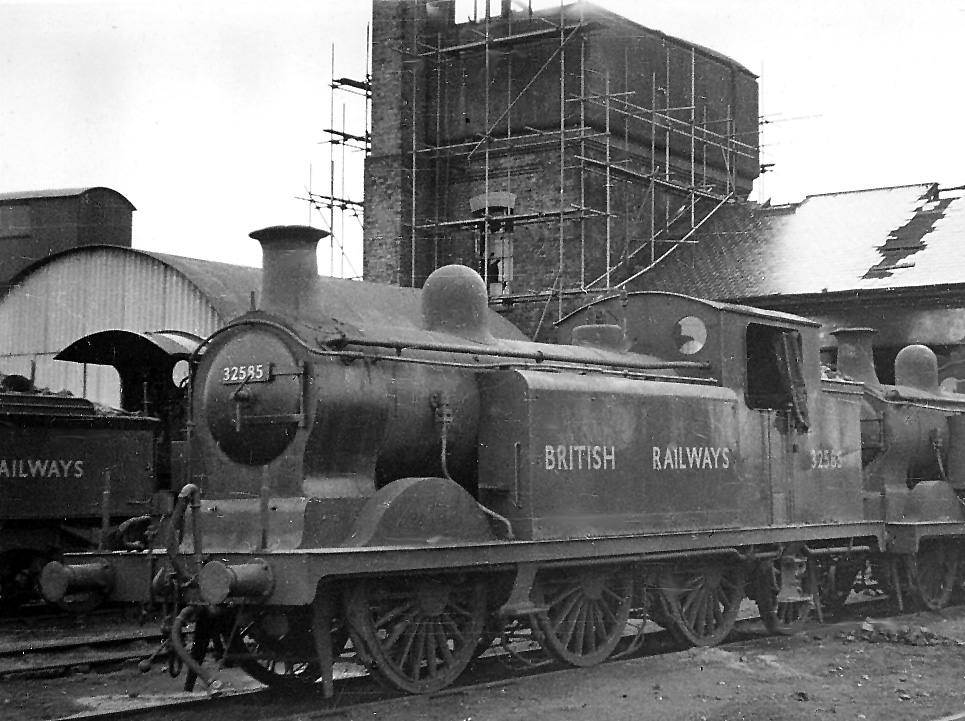
E5 No. 32585 at Three Bridges, 1948

All of the class survived the transfer to Southern Railway ownership in 1923. One E5 was however withdrawn in 1936 and another in 1944 following a collision. The remainder continued in regular use following the nationalisation of the Southern Railway to become a part of British Railways in 1948. However, many of the class were now worn out and the arrival of a large number of new 2-6-4T locomotives in Southern England enabled the withdrawal of the remaining members of the class between 1949 and 1956. No examples have been preserved.

== Numbering ==
British Railways (BR) numbers were 32399-32406, 32567-32576 and 32583-32594. The E5X locomotives were 32401, 32570, 32576, and 32586.

== Sources ==
- Bradley, D.L. (September 1974). The Locomotives of the London Brighton & South Coast Railway: Part 3. London: RCTS. ISBN 0-901115-26-6. OCLC 749316999.
