= LCDR Aeolus class =

Aeolus class
Type and origin
- Power type: Steam
- Builder: Robert Stephenson & Co.
- Build date: September 1860 - April 1861
- Total produced: 4
- Rebuilder: LCDR's Longhedge works
- Rebuild date: 1872–73
- Number rebuilt: 4
Specifications
- Configuration
  - Whyte: 4-4-0 (as built); 2-4-0T (as rebuilt)
- Gauge: 1,435 mm (4 ft 8 1/2 in)
Career
- Operators: London, Chatham and Dover Railway; South Eastern and Chatham Railway
- Class: Aeolus, S
- Numbers: 71–74 (LCDR); 530–533 (SECR)
- Locale: Great Britain
- Withdrawn: July 1905 – November 1909

The LCDR Aeolus class was a class of four 4-4-0 steam locomotives. They were supplied to the London, Chatham and Dover Railway (LCDR) by R. & W. Hawthorn & Co. acting as agents for Robert Stephenson & Co. which built the locomotives, but had subcontracted some components to Hawthorn. Fifteen locomotives had been ordered in July 1858 for the Smyrna and Aydın Railway (S&AR), a railway in Turkey then under construction by a British firm, but delays meant that the S&AR was unable to accept delivery of the whole order, which was cancelled in June 1859. By this time, eight locomotives had been completed and two more were under construction, whilst five had not yet been started. The first six complete locomotives were sent to Turkey in May and June 1859, with four (two of which were complete) being left on the maker's hands. These were offered for sale, and in September 1860 the LCDR agreed to buy three of them for £2,385 each, subsequently agreeing to buy the fourth upon completion. They were delivered to the LCDR between September 1860 and April 1861.

They were all renewed by William Martley as 2-4-0T at the LCDR's Longhedge works in 1872–73, using components from the original locomotives, including the boilers.

Like other LCDR locomotives delivered prior to 1874, the locomotives originally had no numbers, being distinguished by name. In November 1875, William Kirtley (who had replaced Martley following the latter's death in 1874) allotted the class letter S. The locomotives were then given the numbers 71–74. During 1886–88, the locomotives were rebuilt with new boilers. They passed to the South Eastern and Chatham Railway (SECR) at the start of 1899, and their numbers were increased by 459 to avoid duplication with former South Eastern Railway locomotives. Withdrawal commenced in July 1905, but since all of their numbers were required for new locomotives of the SECR H class, the remaining locomotives were transferred to the duplicate list the same month, but only two are known to have been renumbered; the last was withdrawn in November 1909.

Name	Works no.	Delivered	Renewed	LCDR Number	Reboilered	SECR Number	Withdrawn
Aeolus	1207	September 1860	May 1873	71	June 1887	530	July 1905
Bacchus	1208	November 1860	September 1872	72	June 1887	531; 531A from July 1905	November 1909
Vulcan	1209	March 1861	February 1873	73	February 1888	532; 532A from July 1905	April 1906
Comus	1210	April 1861	January 1873	74	March 1886	533; allotted 533A in July 1905	July 1905
