= LB&SCR I2 class =

Class of British steam locomotives

LB&SCR I2 & I4 classes
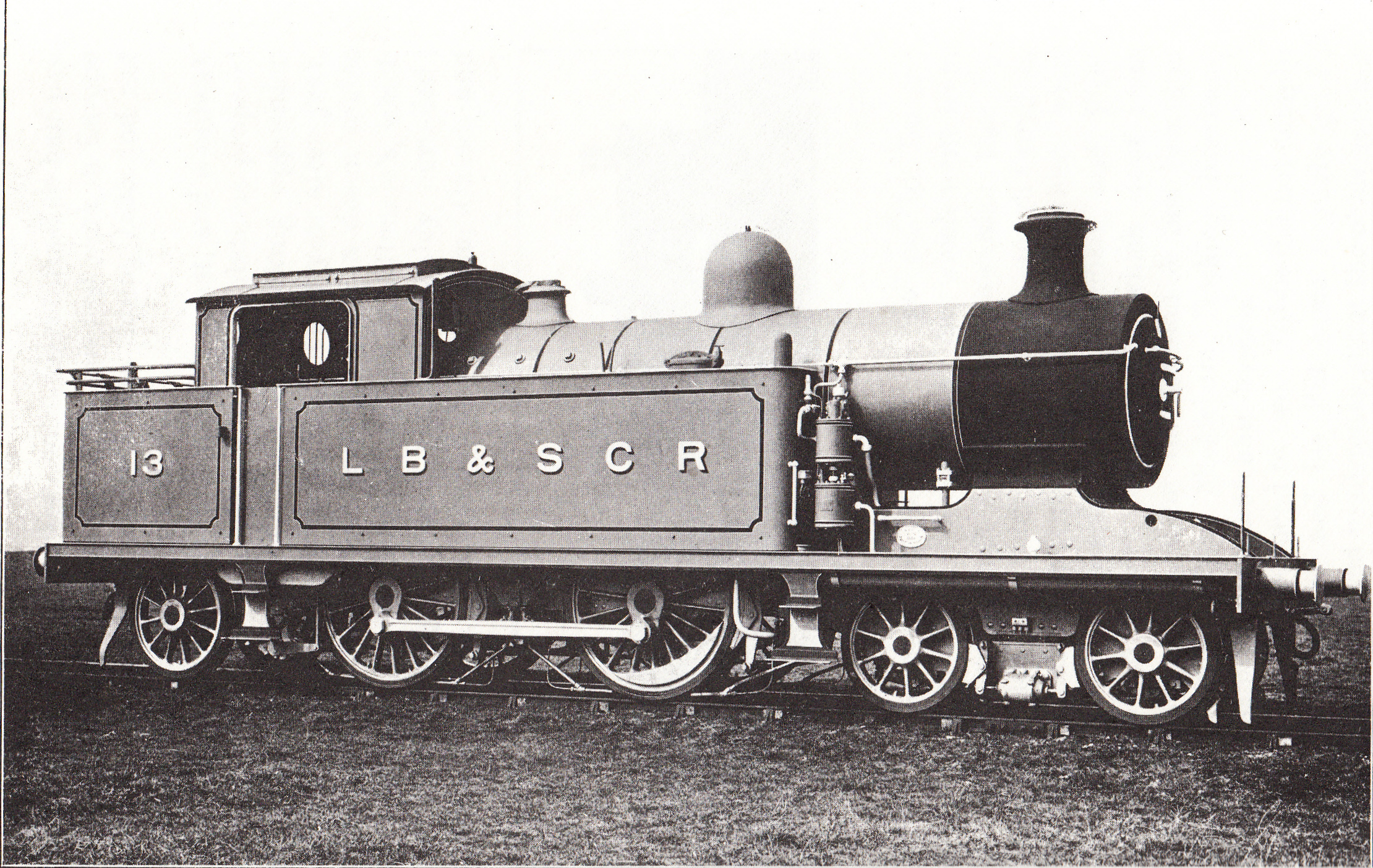
- Side-view builder's photo of LB&SCR I2 class 4-4-2T.
Type and origin
- Power type: Steam
- Designer: D.E. Marsh
- Builder: Brighton Works
- Build date: 1907-1909
- Total produced: I2: 10; I4: 5
Specifications
- Configuration
  - Whyte: 4-4-2T
- Gauge: 4 ft 8 1/2 in (1,435 mm) standard gauge
- Leading dia.: 3 ft 6 in (1.067 m)
- Driver dia.: 5 ft 6 in (1.676 m)
- Trailing dia.: 4 ft 0 in (1.219 m)
- Loco weight: 68.5 long tons (69.6 t; 76.7 short tons) I2, 70.25 long tons (71.38 t; 78.68 short tons) I4
- Fuel type: Coal
- Water cap.: 2,238 imp gal (10,170 L; 2,688 US gal)
- Boiler pressure: 170 psi (12 bar; 1.2 MPa)
- Cylinders: Two, inside
- Cylinder size: 17.5 in × 26 in (444 mm × 660 mm)
Performance figures
- Tractive effort: I2: 17,425 lbf (77.51 kN), I4: 17,790 lbf (79.13 kN)
Career
- Retired: 1933-1940
- Disposition: All scrapped

The LBSCR I2 class was a class of 4-4-2 steam tank locomotives designed by D. E. Marsh for suburban passenger service on the London, Brighton and South Coast Railway. The I4 class were of the same design but incorporated a superheated boiler.

== I2 class ==
In 1907, following the failure of his I1 class, Douglas Earle Marsh sought to fix some of their flaws with a new 4-4-2T design with a longer wheelbase, larger boiler and detailed changes to the front end. In the original order, five of the locomotives would incorporate a superheated boiler to be supplied by the North British Locomotive Company, and the remainder traditional saturated steam boilers from Brighton railway works. In the event, the superheated boilers were delayed in construction and so all ten I2 locomotives had traditional boilers.

== I4 class ==
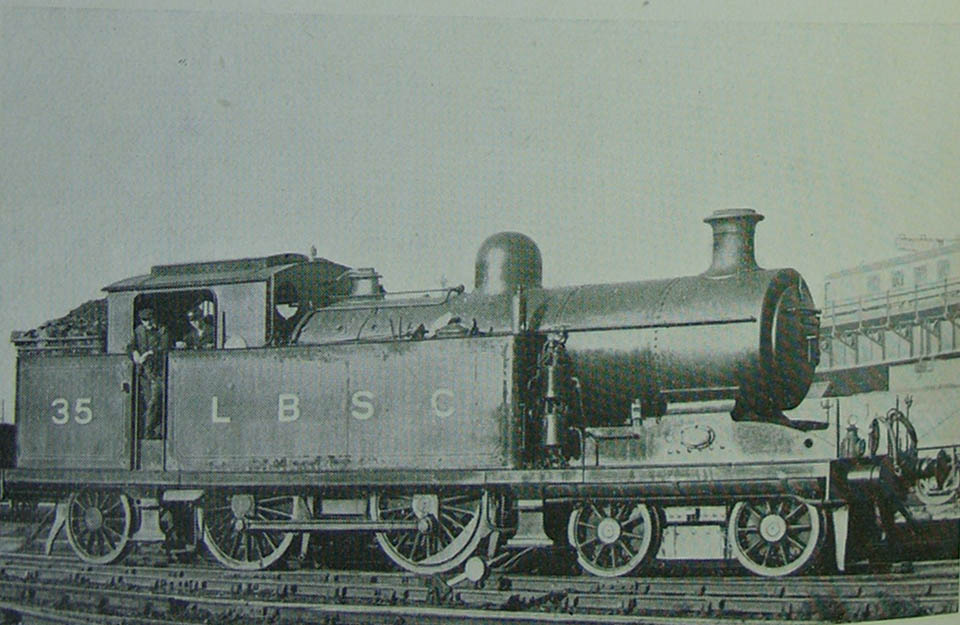
An I4 incorporating a superheated boiler

When the superheated boilers eventually arrived they were used for five further locomotives of the same design as the I2, but these were classified as I4.

However neither the I2 nor I4 class addressed the fundamental problems with the I1 class, that being a small firebox. As a result, the two classes had relatively short lives working lightly loaded secondary services, and the Stroudley D1 and Billinton E4 classes which they were meant to replace continued working.

== Numbering ==
LB&SCR numbers were 11-20 and 31-35. The Southern Railway, which acquired the locomotives in 1923, initially numbered them B11-B20, B31-35 and later 2011-2020, 2031-2035.

== Withdrawal ==
All the I2 were withdrawn between 1933 and 1939 but two locomotives, numbers 2013 and 2019, saw further service on the Longmoor Military Railway where they survived until at least 1947. There they were numbered 2400 and 2401 respectively. These numbers were later changed to 72400 and 72401. The I4 class were withdrawn between 1936 and 1940. No examples of either class have been preserved.

== Locomotive summary ==
I2 class locomotive fleet summary
LB&SC Number	Built	S.R. Number	Withdrawal	Notes
11	December 1907	2011	January 1933	I2
12	March 1908	2012	March 1935	I2
13	April 1908	2013	January 1939	I2, became W.D. 72400 Earl Roberts
14	April 1908	2014	February 1933	I2
15	May 1908	2015	January 1936	I2
16	June 1908	2016	September 1933	I2
17	July 1908	2017	January 1938	I2
18	July 1908	2018	April 1936	I2
19	July 1908	2019	November 1937	I2, became W.D. 72401
20	August 1908	2020	February 1936	I2
31	September 1908	2031	January 1936	I4
32	November 1908	2032	July 1937	I4
33	November 1908	2033	July 1937	I4
34	December 1908	2034	May 1940	I4
35	January 1909	2035	February 1937	I4

== Sources ==
- Bradley, D.L. (1974). Locomotives of the London Brighton and South Coast Railway: Part 3. Railway Correspondence and Travel Society.
- Dendy Marshall, C. F. (1988). History of the Southern Railway. Ian Allan. p. 271. ISBN 0-7110-0059-X.
