= LB&SCR I1 class =

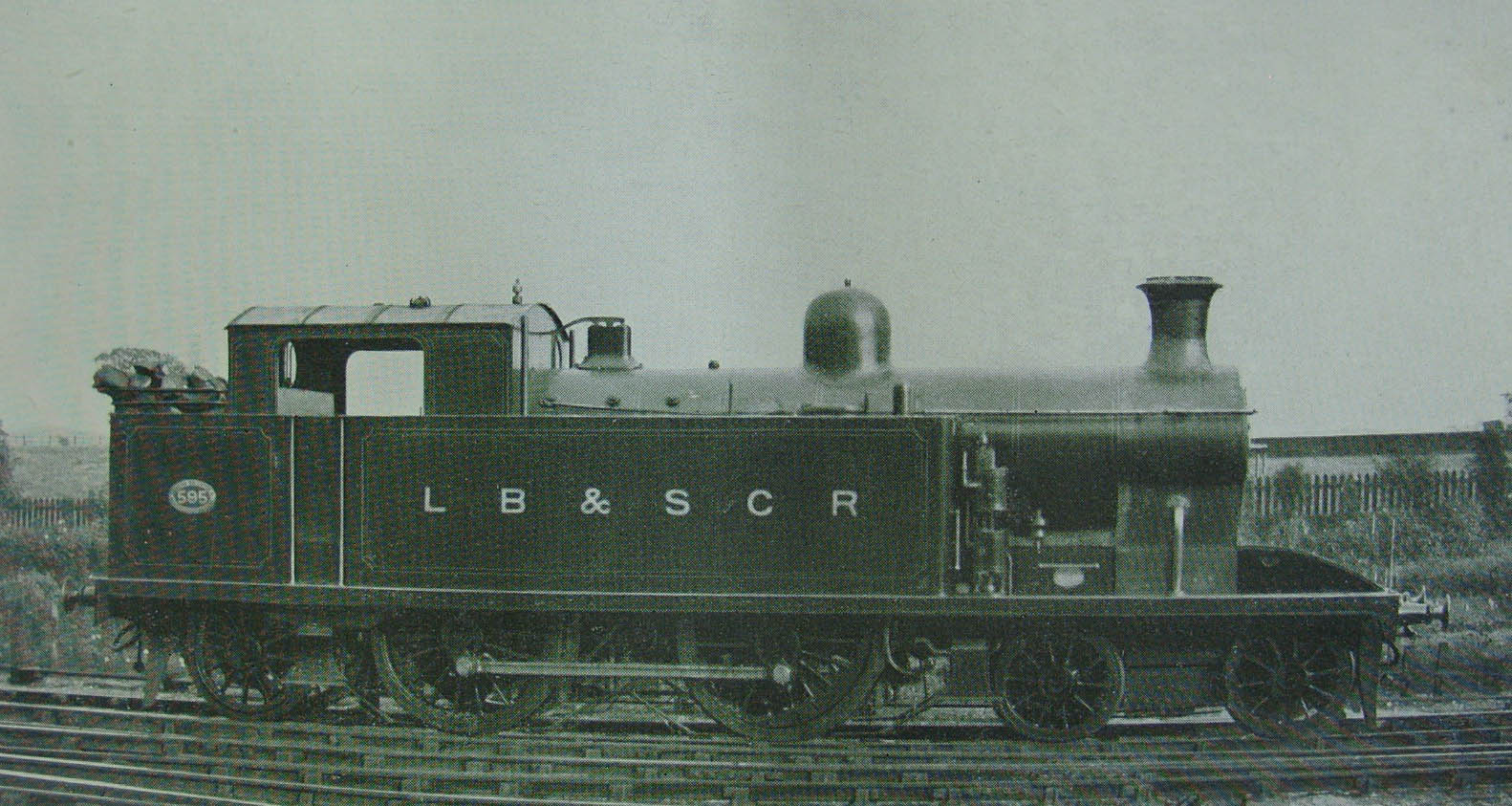
- I1 class with modified chimney
Type and origin
- Power type: Steam
- Designer: D. E. Marsh
- Builder: Brighton Works
- Build date: 1906–1907
- Total produced: 20
- Rebuild date: 1925–1932
Specifications
- Configuration
  - Whyte: 4-4-2T
- Gauge: 4 ft 8 1/2 in (1,435 mm) standard gauge
- Driver dia.: 5 ft 6 in (1.676 m)
- Loco weight: 66 long tons 10 cwt (149,000 lb or 67.6 t) (74.6 short tons)
- Fuel type: Coal
- Water cap.: 1,839 or 1,924 imp gal (8,360 or 8,750 L; 2,209 or 2,311 US gal)
- Boiler pressure: 170 psi (1.17 MPa)
- Cylinders: Two, inside
- Cylinder size: 17.5 in × 26 in (444 mm × 660 mm)
Performance figures
- Tractive effort: 17,430 lbf (77.5 kN)
Career
- Class: As built: I1; Rebuilt 1925–32: I1x
- Power class: BR: 2P (I1x only)
- Numbers: 595-604, 1-10
- Nicknames: Wankers
- Withdrawn: 1944–1951
- Disposition: All scrapped

The LB&SCR I1 class was a class of 4-4-2 steam tank locomotives designed by D. E. Marsh for suburban passenger service on the London, Brighton and South Coast Railway.

== History ==
This class was intended to haul secondary passenger trains, especially in the south London suburbs, and twenty locomotives were constructed by Brighton works between June 1906 and December 1907. The locomotives proved to be reliable but with disappointing performance in their original form, being poor steamers, but all of them passed to the Southern Railway in 1923. They reportedly gained the nickname "Wankers" due to the aforementioned steaming issues, but were also known as 'Wealden Tanks'.

== I1X class ==
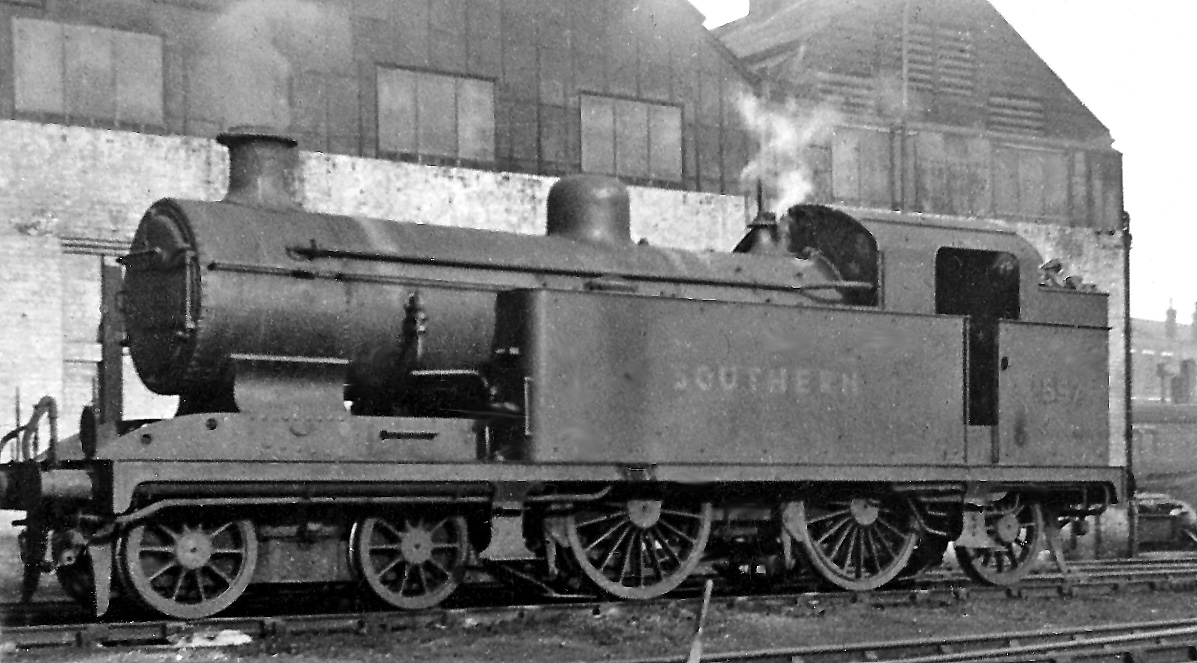
I1X class 2597 at Brighton 1946

Between 1925 and 1932 they were rebuilt by Richard Maunsell with spare boilers left over after the rebuilding of the B4 and I3 classes. The rebuilt engines were designated I1x class, and these new larger boilers greatly improved their performance.

== Withdrawals ==
Two worn-out members of the class were withdrawn by the Southern Railway in 1944 and 1946 respectively, but the remainder survived into British Railways (BR) ownership in 1948, although all had been withdrawn by July 1951 and none have been preserved.

== Numbering ==
The first ten were numbered 595–604 and the second ten were numbered 1–10. The Southern Railway initially added a "B" prefix to these numbers and later renumbered them 2595–2604 and 2001–2010. BR added 30000 to the numbers but it is believed that only 32005 actually carried its number.

== Locomotive Summary ==
I1/I1X class locomotive fleet summary
LBSC No.	1st SR No.	2nd SR No.	BR No.	Date Built	Date Rebuilt	Withdrawn
1	B1	2001	32001	June 1907	December 1931	July 1948
2	B2	2002	32002	July 1907	May 1931	July 1951
3	B3	2003	32003	July 1907	September 1931	July 1948
4	B4	2004	32004	June 1907	January 1932	November 1948
5	B5	2005	32005	August 1907	August 1931	June 1951
6	B6	2006	32006	September 1907	February 1932	September 1948
7	B7	2007	32007	October 1907	October 1931	September 1948
8	B8	2008	32008	October 1907	February 1931	June 1951
9	B9	2009	32009	November 1907	December 1929	April 1951
10	B10	2010	32010	December 1907	October 1929	September 1948
595	B595	2595	32595	September 1906	January 1927	June 1951
596	B596	2596	32596	November 1906	July 1925	June 1951
597	B597	2597	–	December 1906	May 1928	December 1946
598	B598	2598	32598	January 1907	November 1925	September 1948
599	B599	2599	32599	February 1907	October 1928	September 1948
600	B600	2600	–	March 1907	May 1927	October 1944
601	B601	2601	32601	April 1907	February 1928	January 1948
602	B602	2602	32602	April 1907	December 1926	June 1951
603	B603	2603	32603	June 1907	August 1928	April 1951
604	B604	2604	32604	April 1907	August 1927	September 1948

== Sources ==
- Bradley, D.L. (September 1974). The locomotives of the London Brighton and South Coast Railway, Part 3. London: RCTS.
- Dendy Marshall, C. F., History of the Southern Railway, Ian Allan 1988, page 270, ISBN 0-7110-0059-X
