= LB&SCR C3 class =

LB&SCR C3 Class
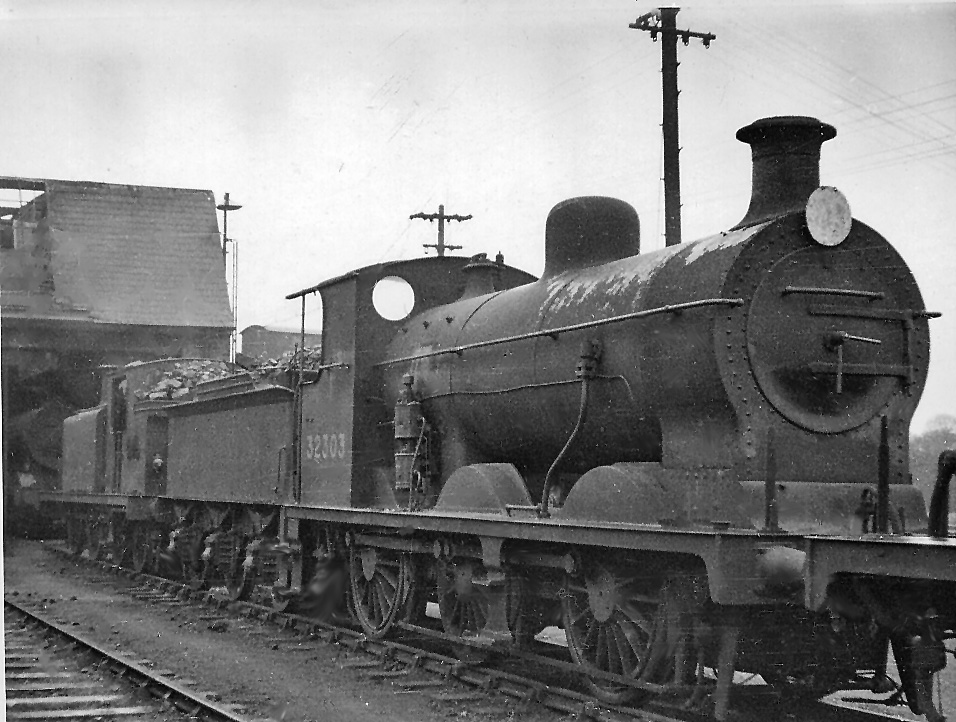
- 32303 at Three Bridges 1948
Type and origin
- Power type: Steam
- Designer: Douglas Earle Marsh
- Builder: Brighton Works
- Build date: 1906
- Total produced: 10
Specifications
- Configuration
  - Whyte: 0-6-0
- Gauge: 4 ft 8 1/2 in (1,435 mm)
- Driver dia.: 5 ft 0 in (1.524 m)
- Loco weight: 45 long tons 5 cwt (101,400 lb or 46.0 t)
- Fuel type: Coal
- Boiler pressure: 170 psi (1.17 MPa)
- Cylinders: Two, inside
- Cylinder size: 17.5 in × 26 in (444 mm × 660 mm)
Performance figures
- Tractive effort: 19,175 lbf (85.3 kN)
Career
- Operators: LBSCR · SR · BR
- Class: C3
- Power class: BR: 2F
- Numbers: LBSC: 300–309; SR: 2300–2309; BR: 32300–303/306–32309
- Nicknames: Horsham Goods
- Withdrawn: 1936–1937, 1948–1952
- Disposition: All scrapped

The London, Brighton and South Coast Railway C3 class was a class of 0-6-0 steam locomotives, intended for heavy freight trains. Ten were built by Brighton railway works in 1906 to the design of Douglas Earle Marsh.

== History ==
This class was intended to replace the smaller Robert Billinton C2 class 0-6-0 on the heaviest freight services. However, although they had an effective boiler, their performance proved to be disappointing, and the fuel consumption was high. Rather than building any further examples Marsh preferred to rebuild the existing locomotives into the C2X class. The members of the C3 class therefore spent their days on secondary freight trains in mid Sussex. Seven of the class spent most of their lives at Horsham and as a result the class was nicknamed "Horsham Goods".

The boiler designed by Marsh for the C3 class was later used with considerably more success on the SR Z class 0-8-0 of 1929.

== Grouping and Nationalisation ==
All of the class passed to the Southern Railway in 1923, but the trade recession of the 1930s caused a decline in freight traffic resulting in the withdrawal of two locomotives in 1936/7. However, the advent of the Second World War ensured that the remaining examples all survived until after the nationalisation of the railways to British Railways in 1948. The remaining locomotives in the class were all withdrawn between 1948 and 1952. No examples have been preserved.

== Locomotive Summary ==
C3 class locomotive fleet summary
LBSC No.	SR No.	BR No.	Date Built	Withdrawn
300	2300	32300	March 1906	July 1951
301	2301	32301	June 1906	February 1951
302	2302	32302	June 1906	January 1952
303	2303	32303	June 1906	September 1951
304	2304	–	July 1906	July 1936
305	2305	–	July 1906	September 1937
306	2306	–	August 1906	October 1951
307	2307	–	August 1906	May 1949
308	2308	–	September 1906	January 1949
309	2309	–	November 1906	December 1948

== Sources ==
- Bradley, D.L. (1974) Locomotives of the London Brighton and South Coast Railway, Part 3. Railway Correspondence and Travel Society.
