= R. J. Billinton =

Robert John Billinton (5 April 1844 – 7 November 1904) was the Locomotive, Carriage, Wagon and Marine Superintendent of the London, Brighton and South Coast Railway from 1890 until his death.

== Early career ==
He was born in Wakefield either on 5 April 1844 or on 5 April 1845, the son of a railway contractor and apprenticed to William Fairbairn & Sons of Manchester in 1859. In 1863 he moved to Simpson & Co. Engineers of Pimlico London, and soon afterwards to the Calderdale Iron Works. From 1865 to 1866 he worked with Roland Child mining and civil engineers of Wakefield. He then became assistant works manager to Munro, Walker and Easton of Sheffield where he was responsible for the design and building of locomotives and stationary engines. In 1870 Robert Billinton was appointed assistant to William Stroudley at the Brighton Works of the LB&SCR. In 1874 he moved to become the assistant of Samuel Waite Johnson of the Midland Railway, at Derby.

== LB&SCR ==
Following Stroudley's death in December 1889, Billinton was appointed as his successor the following month. He was responsible for the design of a number of successful locomotive classes at Brighton including the D (later D3) class 0-4-4T, the C2 class 0-6-0, the B4 4-4-0. He also designed and four classes of radial tank engines E3, E4, E5 and E6. Many of his locomotives were rebuilt with larger boilers by his successor D. E. Marsh.

Billinton also introduced new classes of steel-framed carriage stock to the railway and re-organised and enlarged the locomotive and carriage works at Brighton. Robert Billinton died in office on 7 November 1904.

His son, Lawson B. Billinton (1882–1954) was also the Locomotive Engineer to the LB&SCR from 1912 until his retirement in 1922

== Sources ==
- Bradley, D.L. (1972) The locomotives of the London, Brighton & South Coast Railway: Part 2, The Railway Correspondence and Travel Society, ISBN 0-901115-21-5
- Bradley, D.L. (1974) The locomotives of the London, Brighton & South Coast Railway: Part 3, The Railway Correspondence and Travel Society, ISBN 0-901115-26-6
- Gould, David (1995). Bogie Carriages of the London, Brighton & South Coast Railway. Headington, Oxford: The Oakwood Press. ISBN 0-85361-470-9.
- Marshall, John (1978) A biographical dictionary of railway engineers, David & Charles, ISBN 0-7153-7489-3
- Marx, Klaus (2008). Robert Billinton: an engineer under pressure. The Oakwood Library of Railway History. Usk: Oakwood Press. ISBN 978-0-85361-676-4. OL147.

Business positions
Preceded by William Stroudley	Locomotive, Carriage and Wagon Superintendent of the London, Brighton and South Coast Railway; 1890–1904	Succeeded by D. E. Marsh
