= LB&SCR C2 class =

Class of British steam locomotives

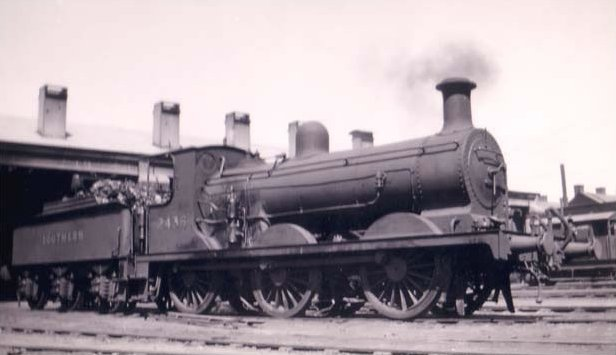
- C2 class 2436 at Brighton in 1948
Type and origin
- Power type: Steam
- Designer: R. J. Billinton rebuilt D. E. Marsh
- Builder: Vulcan Foundry
- Serial number: 1375–1386, 1412–1419, 1699–1718, 1813–1827
- Build date: 1893–1902
- Total produced: 55
- Rebuild date: 1908–1940
Specifications
- Configuration
  - Whyte: 0-6-0
- Gauge: 4 ft 8 1/2 in (1,435 mm) standard gauge
- Driver dia.: 5 ft 0 in (1.524 m)
- Wheelbase: 16 ft 0 in (4.88 m)
- Loco weight: 38 long tons (38.6 t; 42.6 short tons); C2 class 45 long tons (45.7 t; 50.4 short tons) C2X class
- Fuel type: Coal
- Fuel capacity: 4 long tons (4.1 t; 4.5 short tons)
- Water cap.: 2,420 imp gal (11,002 L; 2,906 US gal)
- Boiler pressure: 160 psi (1.10 MPa) C2 class 170 psi (1.17 MPa) C2X class
- Cylinders: Two, inside
- Cylinder size: 17.5 in × 26 in (444 mm × 660 mm)
Performance figures
- Tractive effort: 18,050 lbf (80.3 kN) C2 class 19,175 lbf (85.3 kN) C2X class
Career
- Operators: London Brighton and South Coast Railway; Southern Railway; British Railways
- Power class: 2F
- Withdrawn: 1935–1950 C2 class 1957-1962 C2X class
- Disposition: All Scrapped

The London, Brighton and South Coast Railway C2 class was a class of 0-6-0 steam locomotives, intended for heavy freight trains. Fifty-five were built by the Vulcan Foundry between 1893 and 1902 to the design of Robert J. Billinton. Forty-five of these were later rebuilt between 1908 and 1940, with a larger boiler as the C2X class.

== C2 class ==
In January 1891, Robert Billinton was given authority to build ten new 0-6-0 freight locomotives, to supplement William Stroudley's C1 class of 1882–1887. However, at the time, Brighton railway works was fully committed building Billinton's various classes of radial tanks and so tenders were sought from outside contractors. Ultimately the Vulcan Foundry agreed to construct these ten locomotives, and further orders were received at intervals until 55 had been purchased by February 1902. The class were therefore nicknamed 'Vulcans'.

The new class were not as powerful as their predecessors but were found to be both reliable and also capable of running at speed, thereby enabling them to be used on secondary passenger and excursion duties. As a result, a further ten were ordered from Vulcan Foundry, which were delivered 1893–94, and twenty five delivered 1900–1902.

Summary of orders
Date ordered	Quantity	Works numbers	Running numbers	Entered service
August 1892	10	1375–84	433–442	February–May 1893
September 1892	2	1385–86	443–444	June 1893
January 1894	8	1412–9	445–452	July–November 1894
October 1899	15	1699–1713	521–535	August–November 1900
November 1899	5	1714–8	536–540	November 1900
October 1900	15	1813–27	541–555	December 1901 – February 1902

All were built by Vulcan Foundry.

== C2X class ==
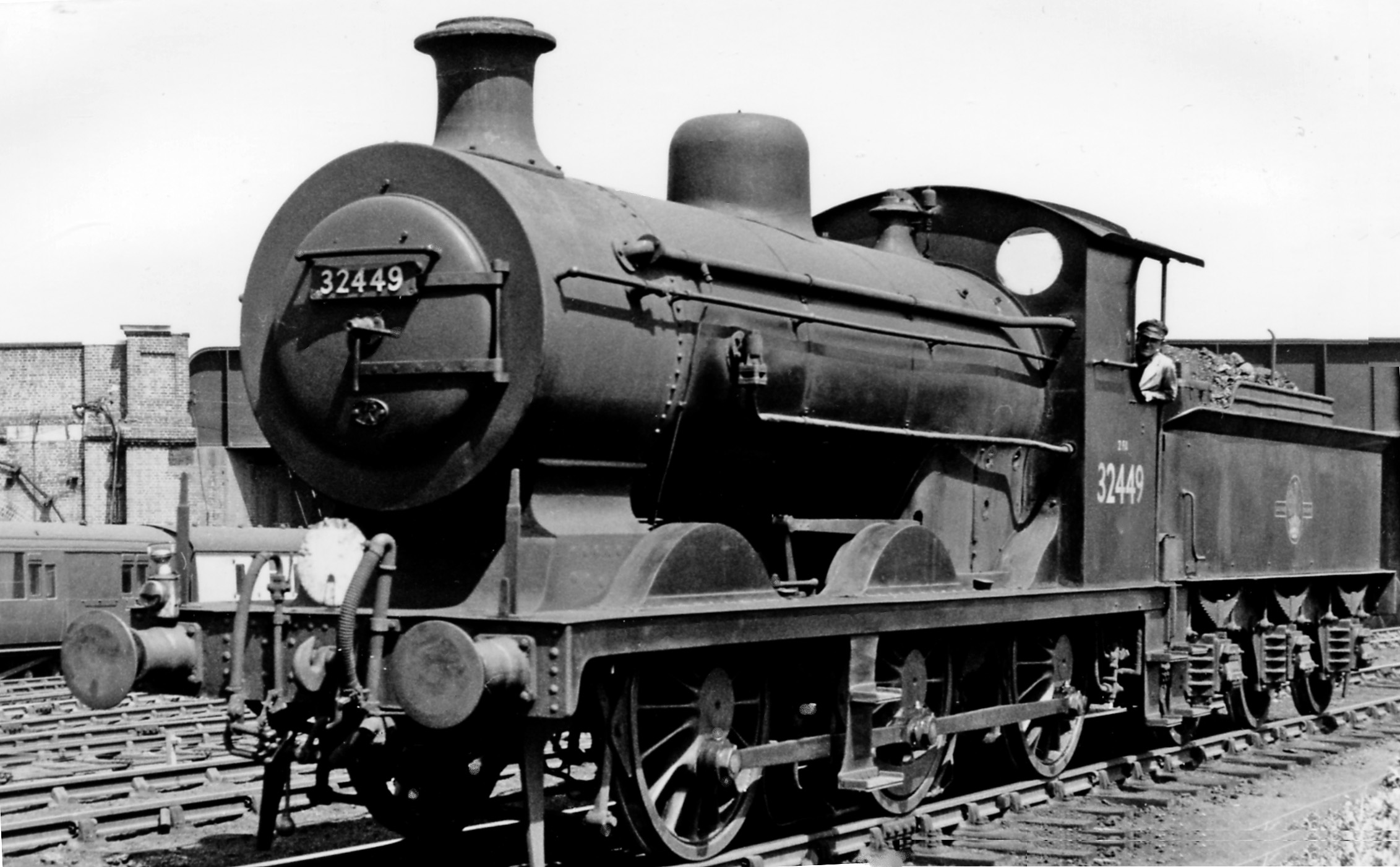
C2X 32449 at Bricklayers' Arms 1958

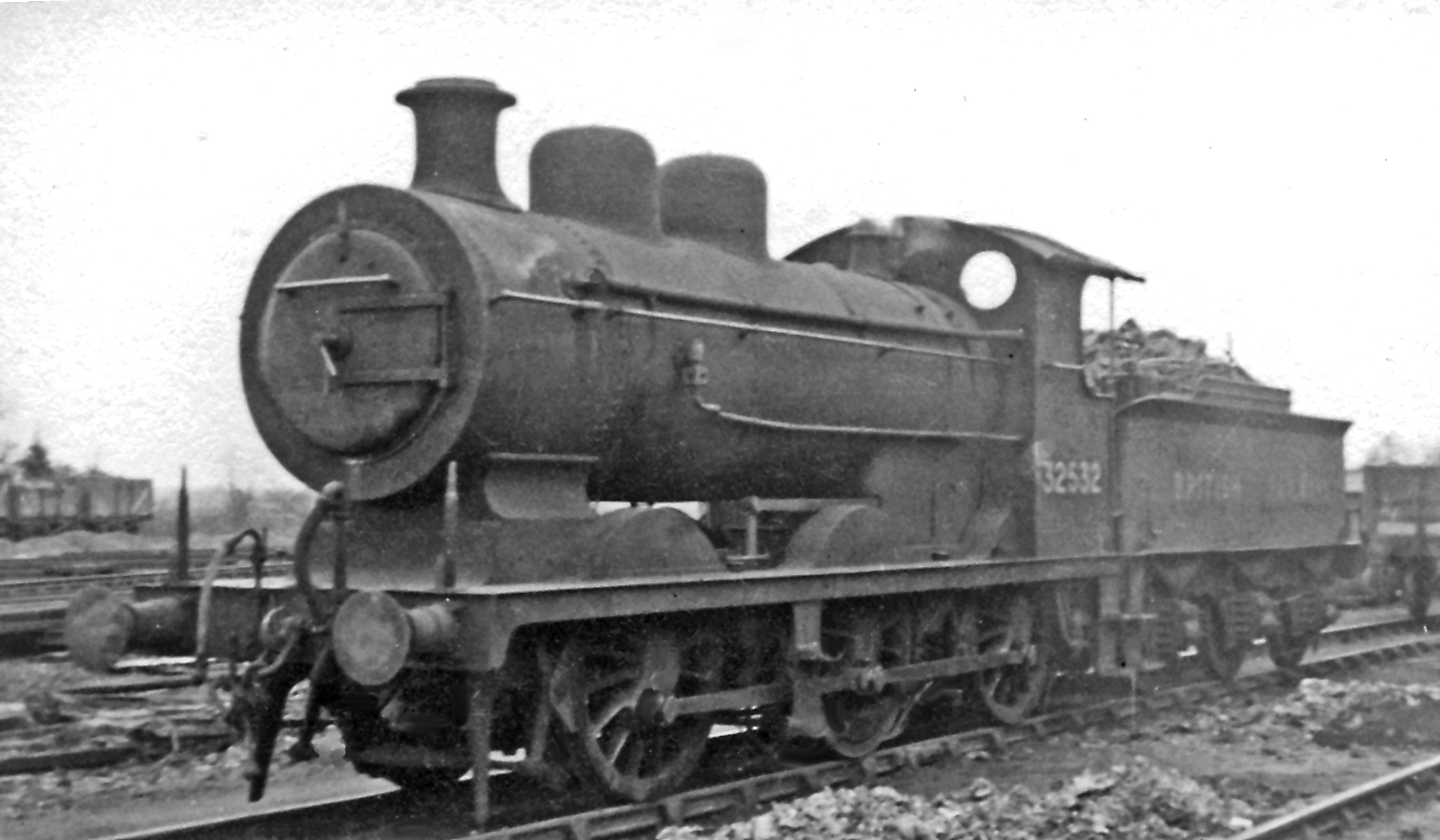
32532, with double dome, at Three Bridges Depot 11 December 1948

During the first decade of the twentieth century the railway experienced a rapid growth in freight traffic and by 1905 their locomotives were no longer capable of hauling the heaviest trains without loss of time. Douglas Earle Marsh's initial response was to introduce his C3 class with a larger boiler in 1906, but the performance of these also proved to be disappointing.

However, in 1908 Marsh rebuilt one C2 with a larger diameter C3 steel boiler and an extended smokebox. In doing so he created an excellent powerful freight locomotive that was classified "C2X", and nicknamed 'Large Vulcans.' The modification was so successful that twenty-nine out of the original fifty-five members of the class were similarly rebuilt by the end of 1912. By this time the class were beginning to struggle to keep time when hauling the heaviest freight trains and began to be superseded on these by the K class 2-6-0 in 1913/14, but were nevertheless kept very busy during the First World War on military supply and munitions trains, and three further C2’s had been rebuilt by the end of 1922.

After the First World War Lawson Billinton acquired ten spare boilers for the class incorporating his own top feed apparatus. These were clearly visible when fitted because of the presence of a second dome.

== Grouping and Nationalisation ==
All of the C2 and C2X locomotives passed to the Southern Railway in 1923, and nine further examples were rebuilt during 1924-5, as the original boilers became due for replacement. However, the trade recession of the early 1930s caused a decline in freight traffic resulting in the withdrawal of seven of the remaining C2 locomotives by the end of 1937. The advent of the Second World War meant that four other survivors were rebuilt in 1939 and 1940 and that the remaining three unrebuilt C2 locomotives remained in service until after the nationalisation of the railways to British Railways in 1948. Those remaining were all withdrawn between 1948 and 1950.

The C2X locomotives remained in regular use on secondary freight trains for a further decade and most had completed very impressive mileages for freight locomotives before they were all withdrawn between 1957 and February 1962. The last two examples were based at Three Bridges and Brighton and had completed 1,340,578 mi (2,157,451 km) and 1,279,527 mi (2,059,199 km) respectively.

No examples have been preserved.

== Accidents and incidents ==
- On 18 April 1918, a freight train became divided, with the rear portion coming to a stand inside Redhill Tunnel. Owing to a signalman's error, a freight train hauled by locomotive No. 541 ran into it. A third freight train hauled by locomotive No. 536 ran into the wreckage. The third train was carrying ammunition and explosives bound for Newhaven, but there was no fire and there were no serious injuries. It took forty hours to clear the potentially explosive debris from the tunnel.
- In October 1940, No. 2550 ran into a bomb crater while carrying a goods train.
- On 19 November 1951, locomotive No. 32522 was hauling a freight train which was derailed between Cocking and Midhurst, West Sussex, when an embankment was washed away. Recovery of the locomotive took more than three months.

== Locomotive summary ==
C2/C2X class locomotive fleet summary
LBSC No.	1st SR No.	2nd SR No.	BR No.	Date Built	Date Rebuilt	Withdrawn
433	B433	2433		February 1893		November 1936
434	B434	2434	32434	February 1893	November 1910	March 1957
435	B435	2435	32435	March 1893		March 1957
436	B436	2436	32436	March 1893		January 1950
437	B437	2437	32437	April 1893	November 1909	January 1950
438	B438	2438	32438	April 1893	February 1924	December 1961
439	B439	2439		April 1893		April 1937
440	B440	2440	32440	May 1893	December 1911	October 1958
441	B441	2441	32441	May 1893	October 1912	October 1961
442	B442	2442	32442	May 1893	June 1922	February 1960
443	B443	2443	32443	June 1893	October 1924	August 1960
444	B444	2444	32444	June 1893	September 1910	March 1960
445	B445	2445	32445	July 1894	March 1911	November 1961
446	B446	2446	32446	July 1894	June 1912	October 1960
447	B447	2447	32447	August 1894	January 1911	February 1960
448	B448	2448	32448	August 1894	November 1912	October 1961
449	B449	2449	32449	October 1894	January 1912	June 1961
450	B450	2450	32450	October 1894	February 1911	October 1961
451	B451	2451	32451	October 1894	March 1924	November 1961
452	B452	2452		November 1894		October 1935
521	B521	2521	32521	August 1900	January 1925	December 1961
522	B522	2522	32522	August 1900	September 1910	October 1961
523	B523	2523	32523	August 1900	April 1924	February 1962
524	B524	2524	32524	September 1900	October 1912	March 1958
525	B525	2525	32525	September 1900	December 1910	January 1962
526	B526	2526	32526	September 1900	June 1940	February 1960
527	B527	2527	32 527	September 1900	October 1939	November 1960
528	B528	2528	32 528	October 1900	September 1911	February 1961
529	B529	2529	32529	October 1900	April 1924	September 1959
530	B530	2530		October 1900		October 1935
531	B531	2531		October 1900		March 1936
532	B532	2532	32532	October 1900	July 1911	May 1960
533	B533	2533		October 1900		February 1950
534	B534	2534	32534	October 1900	May 1911	September 1961
535	B535	2535	32535	November 1900	December 1939	February 1962
536	B536	2536	32536	November 1900	June 1924	March 1961
537	B537	2537	32537	November 1900	August 1924	April 1957
538	B538	2538	32538	November 1900	April 1910	December 1961
539	B539	2539	32539	November 1900	June 1924	November 1961
540	B540	2540	32540	November 1900	December 1922	April 1958
541	B541	2541	32541	December 1901	May 1910	January 1961
542	B542	2542		December 1901		January 1937
543	B543	2543	32543	December 1901	October 1915	October 1960
544	B544	2544	32544	December 1901	January 1911	November 1961
545	B545	2545	32545	December 1901	July 1908	December 1961
546	B546	2546	32546	January 1902	June 1912	April 1961
547	B547	2547	32547	January 1902	October 1908	November 1961
548	B548	2548	32548	January 1902	March 1925	November 1961
549	B549	2549	32549	January 1902	October 1912	December 1961
550	B550	2550	32550	January 1902	November 1910	December 1961
551	B551	2551	32551	February 1902	February 1909	February 1960
552	B552	2552	32552	February 1902	January 1940	June 1961
553	B553	2553	32553	February 1902	October 1908	August 1961
554	B554	2554	32554	February 1902	April 1911	February 1960
555	B555	2555		December 1901		December 1937
