= LB&SCR B4 class =

British steam locomotive class (1899–1951)

LB&SCR B4 and B4X classes
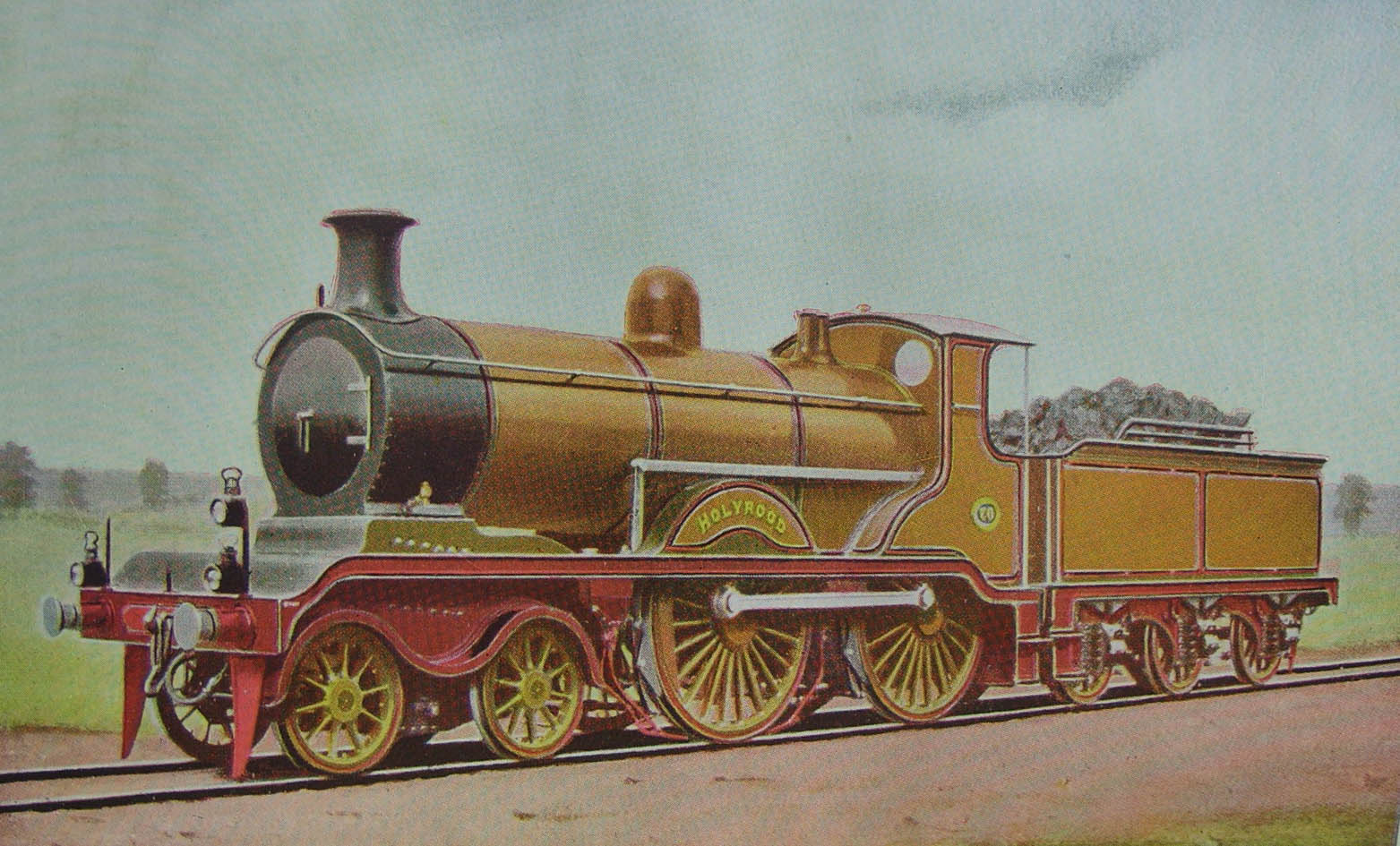
- No. 70 Holyrood B4 class as built
Type and origin
- Power type: Steam
- Designer: B4: R. J. Billinton; B4X: L. B. Billinton
- Builder: Brighton Works: 42–46, 52–54; Sharp, Stewart & Co.: 47–51, 55–74
- Build date: B4: 1899–1902; B4X: 1922–1924
- Total produced: 33
Specifications
- Configuration
  - Whyte: 4-4-0
- Gauge: 4 ft 8 1/2 in (1,435 mm) standard gauge
- Leading dia.: 3 ft 6 in (1.067 m)
- Driver dia.: 6 ft 9 in (2.057 m)
- Total weight: B4: 86 long tons 15 cwt (194,300 lb or 88.1 t) (97.1 short tons); B4X: 96 long tons 6 cwt (215,700 lb or 97.8 t) (107.8 short tons)
- Fuel type: Coal
- Boiler pressure: 180 psi (12.41 bar; 1.24 MPa)
- Cylinders: Two, inside
- Cylinder size: B4: 19 in × 26 in (483 mm × 660 mm); B4X: 20 in × 26 in (508 mm × 660 mm)
Performance figures
- Tractive effort: B4: 17,730 lbf (78.9 kN); B4X: 19,645 lbf (87.4 kN)
Career
- Class: B4, B4x
- Power class: BR: 1P (B4); BR: 3P (B4x)
- Withdrawn: 1934-1951
- Disposition: All scrapped

The B4 class were 4-4-0 steam locomotives built for express passenger work on the London, Brighton and South Coast Railway. They were designed by R. J. Billinton and were built at Brighton works 1899–1902 and Messrs Sharp, Stewart and Company in 1901. Twelve members of the class were rebuilt from 1922 to 1924 by L. B. Billinton with a larger boiler, cylinders and a superheater. The rebuilt locomotives were classified B4X.

== Construction ==
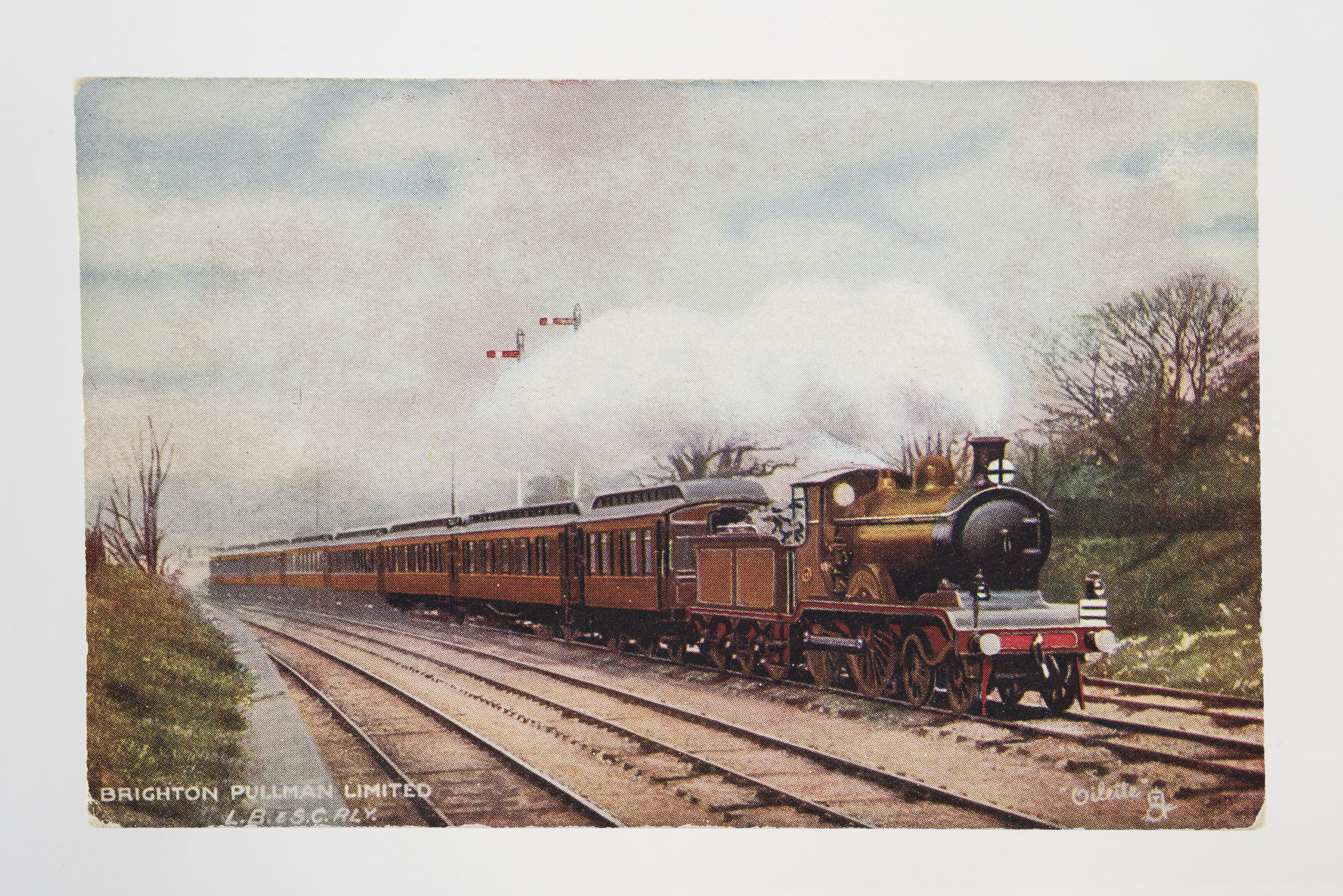
A postcard depicting a B4 heading the celebrated Pullman Brighton Belle

The performance of Robert Billinton's B2 class 4-4-0 locomotives of 1895–1897 had proved insufficient and they were unable to replace the earlier Stroudley B1 class 0-4-2 on the heaviest London to Brighton express trains. Billinton therefore sought authority to construct 25 larger and more powerful 4-4-0 B4 class locomotives. The first two, Nos. 52 and 53, were completed at Brighton works between December 1899 and January 1900, both of which performed well and showed the new design was sound. However, during the spring of 1900 a backlog of repair work at Brighton meant that the third (No. 54) was not completed until May of that year. The railway therefore approached Sharp, Stewart and Company to supply twenty-five further examples over the next twelve months. These were all delivered between June and October 1901. By 1901 Brighton had overcome the backlog of repair work and five further locomotive boilers were ordered from Sharp, Stewart and Company to be used on additional locomotives to be built at Brighton between June and September 1902.

== Use ==
The B4 class successfully hauled the heaviest express trains on the London, Brighton and South Coast Railway until around 1912 when they were gradually replaced by the larger H1, H2, J1 and J2 classes. Thereafter they were regularly used on slower and lighter services. According to O. S. Nock, the B4 class "were among the finest passenger locomotives of their day".

== Rebuilds ==
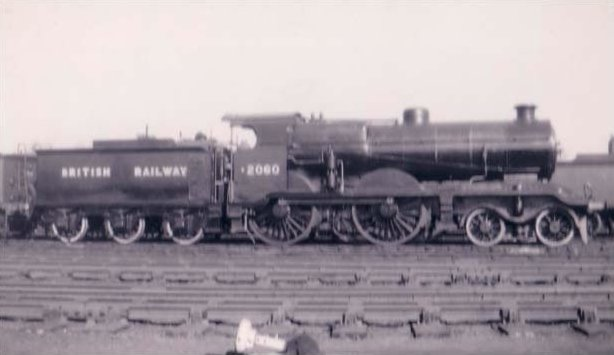
B4X No. 2060 formerly named Kimberley pictured in 1948

In 1918, No. 46 was rebuilt by Lawson Billinton with a new boiler including a Robinson superheater, but the resulting locomotive was not tested before he decided to rebuild other members of the class, using his K class superheated boiler. The rebuilt locomotives were classified B4X, but since the original frames could not be used (as the K class firebox was too long to fit between the axles, new frames, and new piston valve cylinders) they were virtually new engines. However the original motion and motion plate was retained to save costs, which meant that the piston valves were in the constricted space below the cylinders at an angle to the axis of the cylinders. Only 8 in (200 mm)-diameter valves could be fitted in, and combined with the restricted exhaust arrangement ensured they could not make full use of the K class boiler.

Acceleration from stops was very slow and they could only reach speeds up to 70 mph (110 km/h) while newly outshopped and with great difficulty in places, where the Atlantics, J class and Baltics could reach 80 mph (130 km/h). Twelve members of the class were 'rebuilt' between August 1922 and January 1924, but further modifications were deferred by Southern Railway CME Richard Maunsell when it became clear their performance was not satisfactory. When Harold Holcroft was tasked by Maunsell to report on the post grouping loco stock, he found that the B4x were very expensive compared to the SECR rebuilds (D1/E1) and far less capable. It wasn't until 1929 that they could be transferred from express work to secondary duties.

The B4 and B4x classes remained in service, but thirteen examples were withdrawn between 1934 and 1939. Withdrawals paused with the outbreak of World War II and six B4s and twelve B4Xs passed to British Railways in 1948. All had been withdrawn and by 1951.

== Locomotive summary ==
| LB&SCR No. | Build Date | Builder | Rebuilt B4X | LBSCR Name | Renamed/date | 1st SR No. | 2nd SR No. | BR No. | Date withdrawn |
|---|---|---|---|---|---|---|---|---|---|
| 42 | June 1902 | Brighton | — | His Majesty | | B42 | 2042 | – | April 1947 |
| 43 | June 1902 | Brighton | June 1923 | Duchess of Fife | | B43 | 2043 | 32043 | November 1951 |
| 44 | June 1902 | Brighton | — | Cecil Rhodes | | B44 | 2044 | — | September 1948 |
| 45 | June 1902 | Brighton | April 1923 | Bessborough | | B45 | 2045 | — | December 1951 |
| 46 | September 1902 | Brighton | — | Prince of Wales | | B46 | 2046 | — | June 1936 |
| 47 | June 1901 | Sharp, Stewart & Co. | — | Canada | | B47 | 2047 | — | July 1939 |
| 48 | July 1901 | Sharp, Stewart & Co. | — | Australia | | B48 | 2048 | — | January 1936 |
| 49 | July 1901 | Sharp, Stewart & Co. | — | Queensland* | Duchess of Norfolk/1904 | B49 | 2049 | — | January 1936 |
| 50 | July 1901 | Sharp, Stewart & Co. | June 1923 | Tasmania | | B50 | 2050 | — | September 1951 |
| 51 | July 1901 | Sharp, Stewart & Co. | — | Wolferton | | B51 | 2051 | — | February 1949 |
| 52 | December 1899 | Brighton | May 1923 | Siemens | Sussex/1908 | B52 | 2052 | — | December 1951 |
| 53 | January 1900 | Brighton | — | Sirdar | Richmond/1906 | B53 | 2053 | — | November 1935 |
| 54 | May 1900 | Brighton | — | Empress | Princess Royal/1906 | B54 | 2054 | — | May 1951 |
| 55 | July 1901 | Sharp, Stewart & Co. | August 1922 | Emperor | | B55 | 2055 | — | November 1951 |
| 56 | July 1901 | Sharp, Stewart & Co. | August 1923 | Roberts | | B56 | 2056 | — | October 1951 |
| 57 | August 1901 | Sharp, Stewart & Co. | — | Buller | | B57 | 2057 | — | August 1936 |
| 58 | August 1901 | Sharp, Stewart & Co. | — | Kitchener | | B58 | 2058 | — | August 1936 |
| 59 | August 1901 | Sharp, Stewart & Co. | — | Baden Powell | | B59 | 2059 | — | August 1935 |
| 60 | August 1901 | Sharp, Stewart & Co. | September 1922 | Kimberley | | B60 | 2060 | s2060 | November 1951 |
| 61 | August 1901 | Sharp, Stewart & Co. | — | Ladysmith | | B61 | 2061 | — | November 1935 |
| 62 | August 1901 | Sharp, Stewart & Co. | — | Mafeking | | B62 | 2062 | — | May 1951 |
| 63 | August 1901 | Sharp, Stewart & Co. | — | Pretoria | | B63 | 2063 | — | May 1951 |
| 64 | August 1901 | Sharp, Stewart & Co. | — | Windsor | Norfolk/1908 | B64 | 2064 | — | April 1935 |
| 65 | August 1901 | Sharp, Stewart & Co. | — | Sandringham | | B65 | 2065 | — | May 1934 |
| 66 | August 1901 | Sharp, Stewart & Co. | — | Balmoral | Billinton/1906 | B66 | 2066 | — | May 1935 |
| 67 | September 1901 | Sharp, Stewart & Co. | October 1923 | Osborne | | B67 | 2067 | — | September 1951 |
| 68 | September 1901 | Sharp, Stewart & Co. | — | Marlborough | | B68 | 2068 | — | May 1951 |
| 69 | September 1901 | Sharp, Stewart & Co. | — | Bagshot | | B69 | 2069 | — | August 1934 |
| 70 | September 1901 | Sharp, Stewart & Co. | May 1923 | Holyrood | Devonshire/1907.03 | B70 | 2070 | — | August 1951 |
| 71 | September 1901 | Sharp, Stewart & Co. | June 1923 | Goodwood | | B71 | 2071 | 32071 | October 1951 |
| 72 | September 1901 | Sharp, Stewart & Co. | January 1924 | Sussex | | B72 | 2072 | 32072 | December 1951 |
| 73 | October 1901 | Sharp, Stewart & Co. | November 1923 | Westminster | | B73 | 2073 | — | August 1951 |
| 74 | October 1901 | Sharp, Stewart & Co. | — | Cornwall | | B74 | 2074 | — | February 1950 |
