= LB&SCR E2 class =

Class of British 0-6-0T steam locomotive

- No. 100 with short side tanks, 1913
Type and origin
- Power type: Steam
- Designer: L. B. Billinton
- Builder: Brighton Works
- Build date: 1913–1916
- Total produced: 10
Specifications
- Configuration
  - Whyte: 0-6-0T
  - UIC: C n2t
- Driver: 2nd coupled axle
- Gauge: 4 ft 8 1/2 in (1,435 mm) standard gauge
- Coupled dia.: 4 ft 6 in (1.372 m)
- Wheelbase
  - Coupled: 16 ft (4.877 m)
- Length
  - Over buffers: Nos. 100-104 33 ft (10 m) Nos. 105-109 33 ft 3 1/2 in (10.147 m)
- Width: 8 ft 6 in (2.591 m)
- Height: 12 ft 6 in (3.810 m)
- Empty weight: Nos. 105-109: 42 long tons 10 cwt or 43.2 t or 47.6 short tons
- Loco weight: Nos. 100-104: 52 long tons 15 cwt or 53.6 t or 59.1 short tons Nos. 105-109: 53 long tons 10 cwt or 54.4 t or 59.9 short tons
- Fuel type: Coal
- Fuel capacity: 2.46 long tons (2.50 t; 2.76 short tons)
- Water cap.: Nos. 100-104: 1,090 imp gal (5,000 L; 1,310 US gal); Nos. 105-109: 1,256 imp gal (5,710 L; 1,508 US gal)
- Firebox
  - Type: Round-top
  - Grate area: 17.35 sq ft (1.612 m^{2})
- Boiler
  - Model: LB&SCR I2 (modified)
  - Pitch: 8 ft (2.4 m)
  - Diameter: 4 ft 6 in (1.37 m)
  - Tube plates: 10 ft 10 7/16 in (3.313 m)
  - Small tubes: 1 3/4 in (44 mm)
- Boiler pressure: 170 psi (1.2 MPa)
- Heating surface
  - Firebox: 97 sq ft (9.0 m^{2})
  - Tubes: 983 sq ft (91.3 m^{2})
  - Total surface: 1,080 sq ft (100 m^{2})
- Cylinders: Two, inside
- Cylinder size: 17 1/2 in × 26 in (444 mm × 660 mm)
- Valve gear: Stephenson
- Valve type: Slide
- Loco brake: Westinghouse air brakes: Quick-Action
- Couplers: Buffers and chain coupler
Performance figures
- Tractive effort: 21,305 lbf (94.77 kN)
Career
- Operators: London Brighton and South Coast Railway; Southern Railway; Southern Region of British Railways
- Power class: BR: 3F
- Withdrawn: 1961–1963
- Disposition: All scrapped

The London, Brighton and South Coast Railway (LB&SCR) E2 class was a class of ten 0-6-0T steam locomotives designed by Lawson Billinton, generally employed for shunting, piloting duties in Victoria station, empty-stock duties and local goods trains.

Introduced in 1913, the E2 class were the first of Billinton's own designs for the LB&SCR, built to replace some of the early Stroudley E1 goods engines. With the advantage of improved boiler feeds the E2 class were less restricted in their activities than the E1 class. However, the first five members of the class suffered from inadequate water capacity. Despite this, this class was a success as shunters and local goods traffic, therefore a second batch of another five slightly modified ones was built.

== History ==
=== Background ===
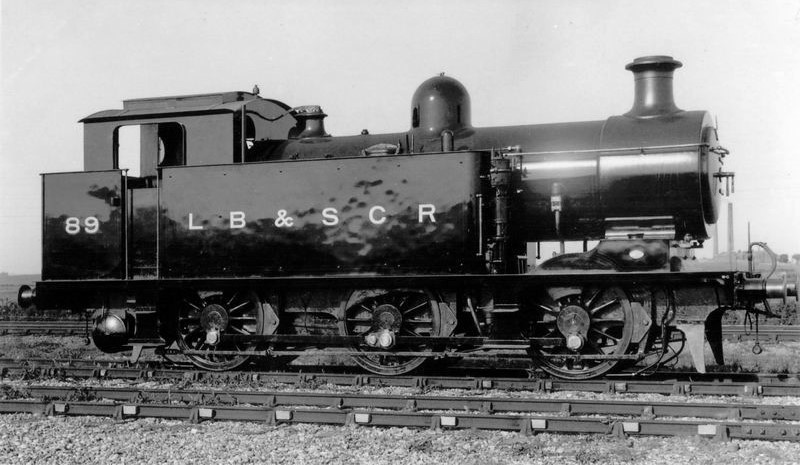
E1X class No. 89 as rebuilt by Marsh as a prototype for the E2 class.

The Stroudley E1 class, built from 1874 to 1891, were used as station pilots and on short-distance goods trains on the LB&SCR, with the class eventually replaced by the E3 class of 1894, designed by Stroudley's successor, R. J. Billinton, father of L. B. Billinton, based on the prototype E3 class No. 158 West Brighton, designed as an 0-6-2T in 1891. The E3 radial tanks were beneficial on most goods trains except the heaviest, with their small wheels limiting their usefulness on suburban passenger services. The E3 class were succeeded by larger and more powerful locomotives such as the E4, E5, and E6 classes. With retirements of the older E1 engines beginning in 1908. R. J. Billinton was succeeded as Locomotive Superintendent by D. E. Marsh in 1904.

By 1910, many of the E1 class were worn out and insufficient for the heavier duties now required of them. The LB&SCR had been aware for some years that the E1 class were nearing the end of their serviceability, not due to mechanical failure, but because the local goods and shunting duties they were used on so successfully were becoming too heavy. One of Marsh's last acts was to rebuild E1 class No. 89 Brest at Brighton works, classified as E1X class, forming the prototype of the later E2 class. Marsh had always been reluctant to scrap rolling stock, often choosing to reboiler or otherwise renew engines, L. B. Billinton, however, having succeeded Marsh in 1911, firmly believed that older locomotives needed to be scrapped and replaced with more modern, larger machines. Marsh's rebuild of No. 89 Brest included a larger boiler (to the same design as that of the D1X class), extended water tanks and coal bunker, a new cab, and steam sanding installed. Marsh had intended to rebuild further E1 class to E1X, but was unexpectedly forced to retire, citing poor health, however, irregularities in his accounting had been discovered shortly before his departure.

=== Design and construction ===
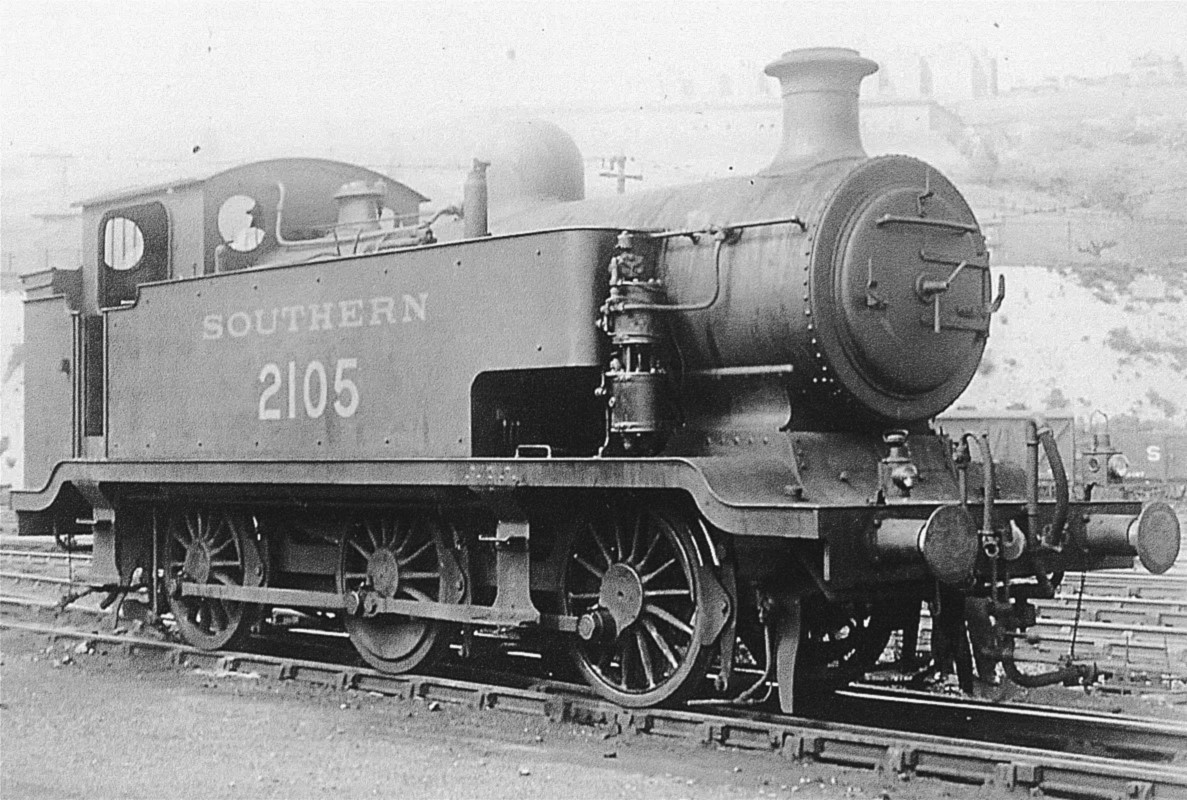
Second series E2 class, SR No. 2105 (originally 105), with extended tanks from 1915, during Southern Railway (SR) ownership.

By November 1911, L. B. Billinton was advised that a class of 20 local goods and shunting locomotives should be built by way of renewing older designs. Billinton, preferring to build new designs, designed and ordered five new 0-6-0 tank engines by October 1912 from Brighton works at a cost of £2,010 each, and at the same time set a side a similar number of E1 class for withdrawal.

The class included several features found on other LB&SCR classes, such as an I2 class boiler producing 170 psi (1,200 kPa), modified to accommodate a Weir pump and hot water injector for use with high-pressure steam, the cylinders and motion were from the B4 class, but reduced to 17 1/2 in (440 mm). Billinton was persuaded that no advantages would accrue from superheating small tank engines intended for local goods or shunting operations, and thus considered superheating a wasteful extra expense resulting in added maintenance.

The E2 class had slotted frames, with the running board featuring a curved drop towards each - which became a staple of Billinton's designs, six 4 ft 6 in (1.372 m) wheels, a water capacity of 1,090 imp gal (5,000 L; 1,310 US gal) with a weight of 52 3/4 long tons (53.6 t; 59.1 short tons). Five engines were built to the original design with short side tanks, numbered 100 to 104, entering service between May and December 1913. The E2 class were more powerful than the E1 class which they replaced, with the advantage of improved boiler feeds, giving them broader availability. However, the initial five engines were handicapped by their small water capacity.

The first three engines, Nos. 100-102, were equipped with a reverser handle, whilst the last two, Nos. 103-104, were fitted with a screw-and-handle system. Though occupied with the introduction of the K and L classes, Billinton, with approval sanctioned by the board in March 1914, ordered five more from Brighton at a cost of £2217 per locomotive. However, as a result of World War I, construction was delayed, resulting in the final member of the E2 class, No. 109, not being completed until late 1916.

Because of the small water capacity on the first five engines, Billinton gave the next batch of five engines, Nos. 105-109, extended side tanks reaching just behind the smoke box, and increasing water capacity increased by 166 imp gal (750 L; 199 US gal), totalling 1,256 imp gal (5,710 L; 1,508 US gal). Their overall length extended by 3.5 in (89 mm). The second batch had the bottom of their tanks cut out to give access to the motion and air assisted screw-and-handle reversing to aid with shunting and allow the engines to work passenger trains. The weight distribution of the wheels of the second batch had alterations in addition to the extended tanks; their weight increased to 53 long tons 10 hundredweight (54.4 t).

=== Operations ===
The first of the E2 class engines, No. 100 was sent new to Eastbourne, shunting locally and working the mid-day goods to various utility sidings and down to the ballast hole on Crumbles beach. This supplied the LB&SCR's shingle for ballasting its track, between May and July 1914, 3,835 tons were dispatched, ballast was also exported to the Midland Railway to balance its inward coal sheds at Battersea, Brighton and New Cross. Nos. 103 and 104 went to New Cross, No. 101 to Battersea and No. 102 to Brighton where it was employed on goods trains to Hassocks.

In 1914, Nos. 103 and 104 were fitted with the standard air assisted screw-and-handle system, painted in the LB&SCR passenger livery of umber lined with darker umber with yellow lettering, and provided with push-pull equipment, working in the middle of two sets of three coaches, running between London Bridge, Forest Hill and Crystal Palace. However, due to insufficient coal capacity, couldn't sustain continuous journeys between the stations for a very prolonged period it was also discovered that the E2 class excessively oscillated when accelerating from stations or signals and was quite unsteady at high speeds; fire-throwing also proved to be a problem.

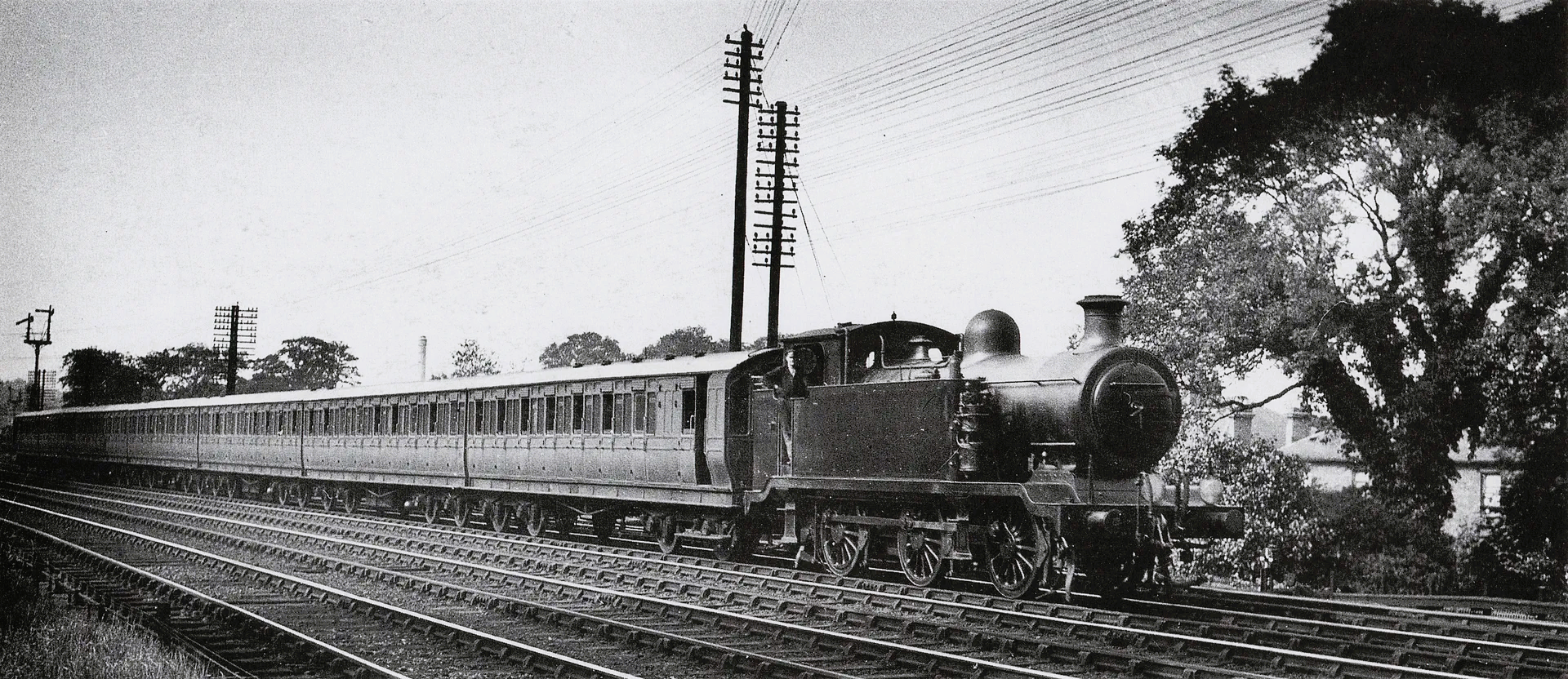
No. 103 working empty stock at Forest Hill, Lewisham

No. 104 was later transferred to Tunbridge Wells for the local motor-train service there, but, likely due to severe oscillation when accelerating from a complete stop was found to be unacceptable. The push-pull equipment was discarded and both engines returned to shunting and local goods duties.

The first four of the second variant with extended tanks, Nos. 105-108 went to London for use on piloting and empty stock workings out of London Bridge, and Victoria, but due to wartime demand, saw them increasingly involved in conveying wagons to the Midland and Great Northern Railways (GNR). No. 105, and No. 108 went to Battersea, while No. 106, and No. 107 went to New Cross, and No. 109 to Brighton. Nos. 106 and 107 spent much of their time piloting at London or empty-stock duties. Nos. 105 and 108 were employed on local goods trains, occasionally one of them worked in the Norwood Junction goods yard at Battersea. In May 1916, No. 105 was transferred to Three Bridges to assist in marshalling goods trains arriving from the GNR and Great Western Railway. However, the local engine drivers preferred the older E3 class, and No. 105 was returned to Battersea.

In 1919, No. 102 was transferred to Battersea and its duties were handed over to No. 109, which comprised taking a goods train from Brighton to Hassocks before working to Angmering stopping to pick up wagons at Portslade, Shoreham, Worthing, West Worthing and Goring.

After the end of hostilities, the cost of wages had increased rapidly during the war years, and in 1921 Billinton was instructed to carry out a series of time-and-motion studies regarding the likely expenditure of his department. With shunting in mind, a service movement recorder was fitted to No. 109, resulting in the rescheduling of some main line goods services and making more efficient use of the yard pilots, reducing the number of shunting engines daily in steam by 11.

After the grouping of 1923 in which the LB&SCR was amalgamated into the Southern Railway (SR), the E2 class, which were renumbered Nos. 2100-2109, were allocated to piloting duties at London Victoria station, and continued working local goods trains. However, as a result of the General Strike of 1926, Nos. 103, 104, 106, and 107 were employed as passenger locomotives. These engines operated around London, could also be seen No. 109 worked a local service whilst on loan to Tunbridge Wells, while also working morning pick-up goods trains to Three Bridges.

The LB&SCR locomotive designs had little impact on the locomotive policy of the Southern Railway after 1923. However, in late 1927 Maunsell ordered studies for a new 0-6-0T to replace a large numbers of pre-Grouping locomotives; the E2 class was the starting point. A total of 105 engines similar to the ex-LB&SCR E2 class were proposed as a standard SR branch line type, but financial constraints resulted in the cancelation of this project.

Following the electrification of the Brighton line in 1936, the class was used as replacements for the ex-LCDR T class at the Herne Hill marshalling yard, around Victoria station; being used to sort sidings and to move empty stock around Victoria. In the late-1930s, Nos. 2106 and 2107 were allocated to Dover to shunt sleeping coaches and other rolling stock on and off the new train ferries, always bringing in the Wagon-Lits stock for the Night Ferry and then bank the train to Chatham. The E2s allocated to shunting the train ferries from France ceased doing so at the outbreak of World War II in 1939. During World War II the E2 class were assigned to Stewarts Lane, Nos. 2108 and 2109 temporarily filling-in for an SR Z class at Hither Green marshalling yard; the Z class having been loaned to the War Department, but they were not very well received in Scotland and were moved to Dover in 1944 when the Second Front was opened.

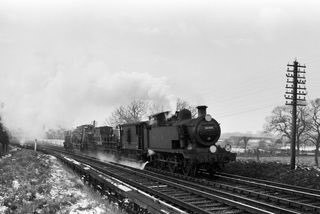
BR No. 32106 on a goods train.

After World War II, in 1948, the Southern Railway absorbed into British Railways, and the weir pump on the E2 class was discarded and replaced by injectors. Some engines of the class were drafted to Southampton Docks to replace withdrawn E1 class engines on trip working and shunting in the mid-1950s (Some of the E1s who remained in service went to work in Southampton), working alongside USATC S100 tank engines. Six examples were retained for this purpose and were found to be quite well suited in this niche before being replaced by BR class 07 diesel shunters in 1962.

When the E2 class was retired it was one of the last classes of the LB&SCR to be withdrawn, along with the E4 and A1 classes, all of which were retired in 1963. The top mileage for the class as local goods engines was 799,110.000 miles (1,286,042.884 km) other members had a similar mileage during its nearly 5 decades of service, none survived into preservation, the last two engines being retired in April 1963.

Of their legacy, Hamilton Ellis stated,

Though dumpy [stumpy] little engines, they had the good lines of all the Billinton dynasty.

— C. Hamilton Ellis, The London, Brighton and South Coast Railway

== Fleet summary ==
| Image | LB&SCR No. | Date Built | S.R. No. | B.R. No. | Date Withdrawn |
|---|---|---|---|---|---|
| | 100 | June 1913 | 2100 | 32100 | November 1961 |
| | 101 | August 1913 | 2101 | 32101 | September 1962 |
| | 102 | October 1913 | 2102 | 32102 | October 1961 |
| | 103 | December 1913 | 2103 | 32103 | October 1962 |
| | 104 | January 1914 | 2104 | 32104 | April 1963 |
| | 105 | June 1915 | 2105 | 32105 | September 1962 |
| | 106 | September 1915 | 2106 | 32106 | October 1962 |
| | 107 | March 1916 | 2107 | 32107 | February 1961 |
| | 108 | July 1916 | 2108 | 32108 | June 1961 |
| | 109 | October 1916 | 2109 | 32109 | April 1963 |

== In popular culture ==
In 1946, Alexander Reginald Payne used the later series of E2 locomotives with the extended side tanks as the basis for the character Thomas the Tank Engine in the second book of The Railway Series by the Rev. W. Awdry.

== OO gauge models ==
Hornby produced the locomotive in its earliest form as an OO gauge model. Production lasted from 1979 to 1985 in three distinct variants with four reference numbers.

== Bibliography ==
- Marx, Klaus (2007). Lawson Billinton: A Career Cut Short (1st ed.). The Oakwood Press. ISBN 978-0-85361-661-0.
- Ellis, C. H. (1960). The London, Brighton and South Coast Railway (1st ed.). Ian Allan Publishing. OCLC 8118345.
- Bradley, D. L. (1974). Locomotives of the London Brighton and South Coast Railway: Part 3. Railway Correspondence and Travel Society. ISBN 978-0901115263.
- Cocks, C. S. (17 November 1948). "History of Southern Railway Locomotives to 1938". Institution of Locomotive Engineers. 38 (206).
- Chacksfield, J. E. (1998). Richard Maunsell: An Engineering Biography. Railway Correspondence and Travel Society. ISBN 978-0-85361-526-2.
- Riley, R. C. (2001). The Heyday of Stewarts Lane and its Locomotives. Ian Allan Publishing. ISBN 978-0-7110-2791-6.
- Glenn, D. F. (1993). More Last Days of Steam in Hampshire and the Isle of Wight. Alan Sutton. ISBN 978-0-7509-0224-3.
- Kennedy, Rex (1992). Ian Allan's 50 years of Railways 1942-1992. Ian Allan Publishing. ISBN 978-0-7110-2114-3.
- Sibley, Brian (1995). The Thomas the Tank Engine Man. Heinemann. ISBN 0-434-96909-5.
- MacLeod, A. B. (November 1978). "Some Memories of a Fireman on the LB&SCR". Railway World. Shepperton: Ian Allan Publishing.
