= LB&SCR J1 and J2 classes =

Classes of steam tank engines

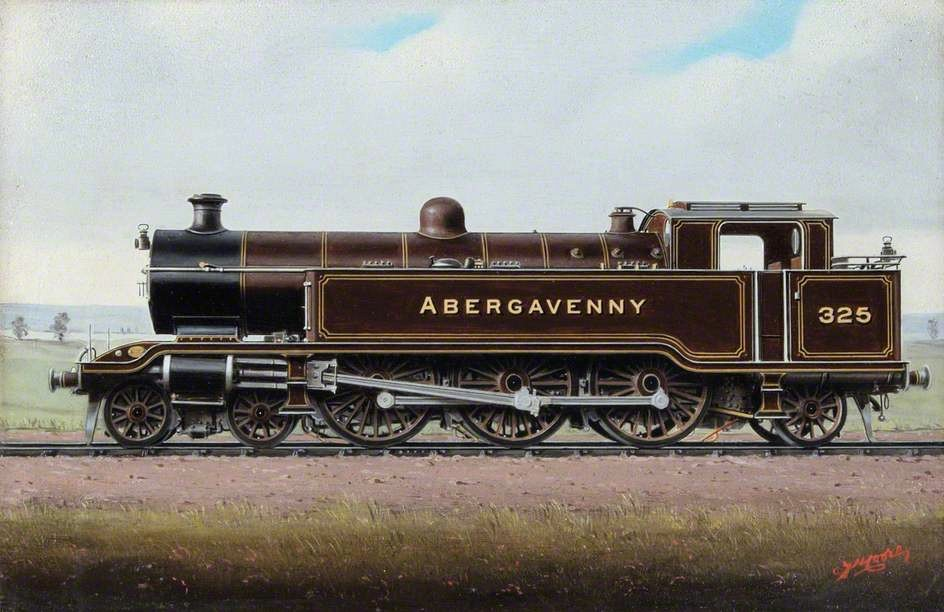
- J1 class 'Abergavenny'
Type and origin
- Power type: Steam
- Designer: D.E. Marsh
- Builder: Brighton Works
- Build date: 1910 and 1912
- Total produced: J1: 1; J2: 1
Specifications
- Configuration
  - Whyte: 4-6-2T
- Gauge: 4 ft 8 1/2 in (1,435 mm) standard gauge
- Leading dia.: 3 ft 6 in (1.067 m)
- Driver dia.: 6 ft 7 1/2 in (2.019 m)
- Trailing dia.: 4 ft 0 in (1.219 m)
- Loco weight: J1: 89 long tons (90.4 t; 99.7 short tons); J2: 87.25 long tons (88.7 t; 97.7 short tons)
- Fuel type: Coal
- Boiler pressure: 170 psi (11.72 bar; 1.17 MPa)
- Cylinders: Two, outside
- Cylinder size: 21 in × 26 in (533 mm × 660 mm)
Performance figures
- Tractive effort: 20,800 lbf (92.5 kN)
Career
- Class: No. 325: J1; No. 326: J2
- Power class: BR: 4P
- Withdrawn: 1951
- Disposition: Both scrapped

The LB&SCR J1 and J2 classes were 4-6-2 steam tank locomotives designed by D. E. Marsh for express passenger services on the London, Brighton and South Coast Railway.

== History ==
Following the success of his I3 4-4-2 tank locomotive class, Douglas Earle Marsh decided to enlarge the class to create a tank locomotive capable of hauling the heaviest London-Brighton express trains. The first locomotive No. 325 was classified 'J1' and completed by Brighton Works in December 1910. It incorporated a Schmidt superheater and inside Stephenson valve gear. After initial modifications to the firebox to improve its coal consumption, it proved to be a successful design. A second locomotive was therefore ordered in May 1911, but Marsh soon afterwards went on prolonged sick leave and all work ceased.

Marsh's successor Lawson Billinton made detailed changes to the design before work on the second locomotive recommenced, incorporating the Walschaerts valve gear. No. 326 was therefore classified as 'J2' and completed in March 1912.

Both locomotives performed well, although No. 326 was considered the faster. They were used on the heaviest trains, together with the H1 and H2 classes until after the formation of Southern Railway in January 1923.

During 1925 and 1926, the two classes were gradually replaced on the heaviest London-Brighton express trains by the 'King Arthur' and 'River' classes, and were used on lighter express services until the electrification of the London to Brighton line in 1935. Thereafter they were transferred to Eastbourne and used on London expresses from that town until they ceased following the outbreak of the Second World War.

The two locomotives spent the early months of the War in store but were later transferred to Tunbridge Wells. They both survived into British Railways (BR) ownership in 1948, but in June 1951 they were both replaced by new LMS Fairburn designed 2-6-4T locomotives and were withdrawn and scrapped.

== Locomotive summary ==
LB&SC No.	Name	Built	SR No.	B.R. No.	Withdrawal
325	Abergavenny	December 1910	2325	32325	June 1951
326	Bessborough	March 1912	2326	32326	June 1951

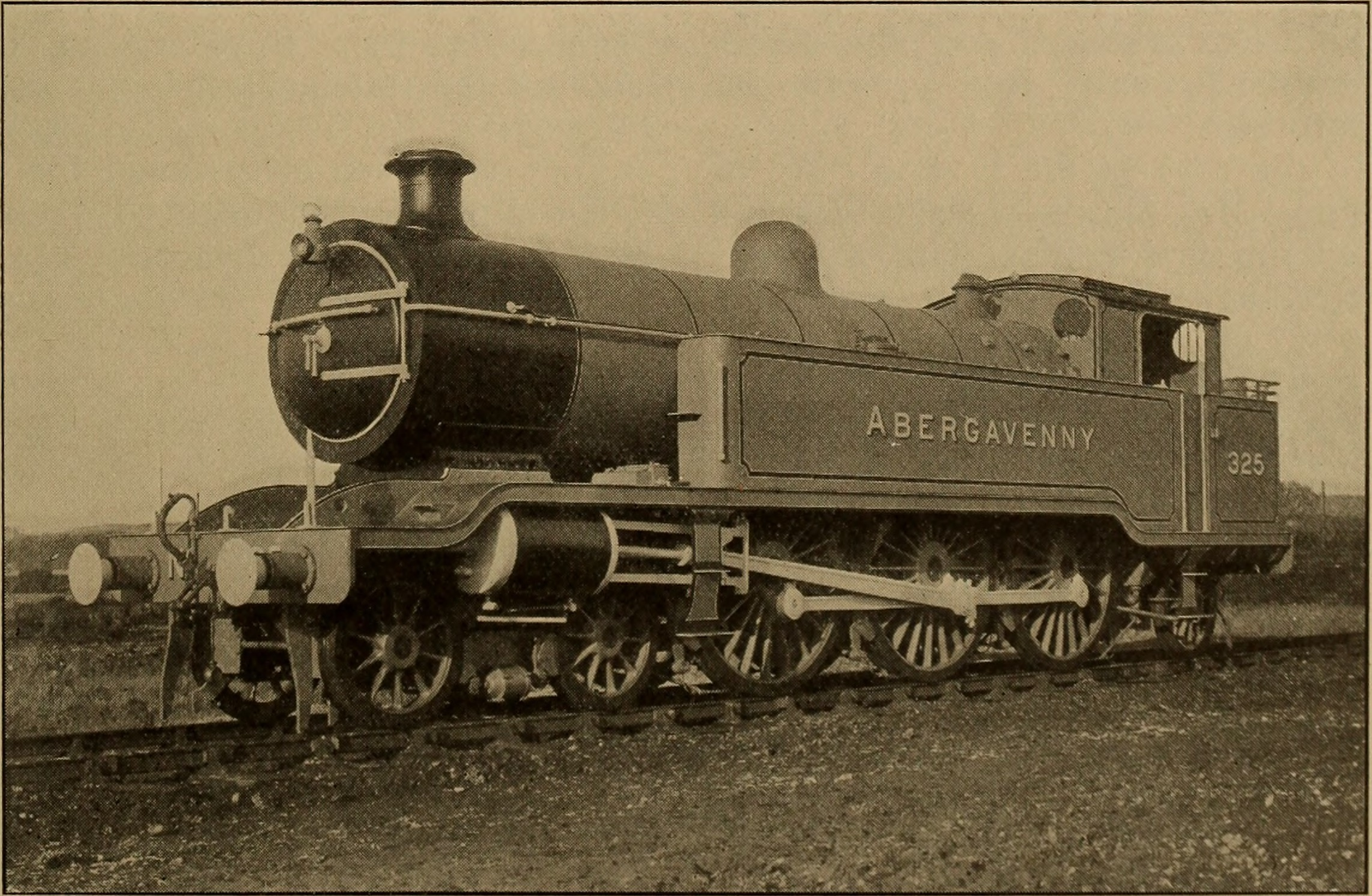
Loco No. 325 Abergavenny

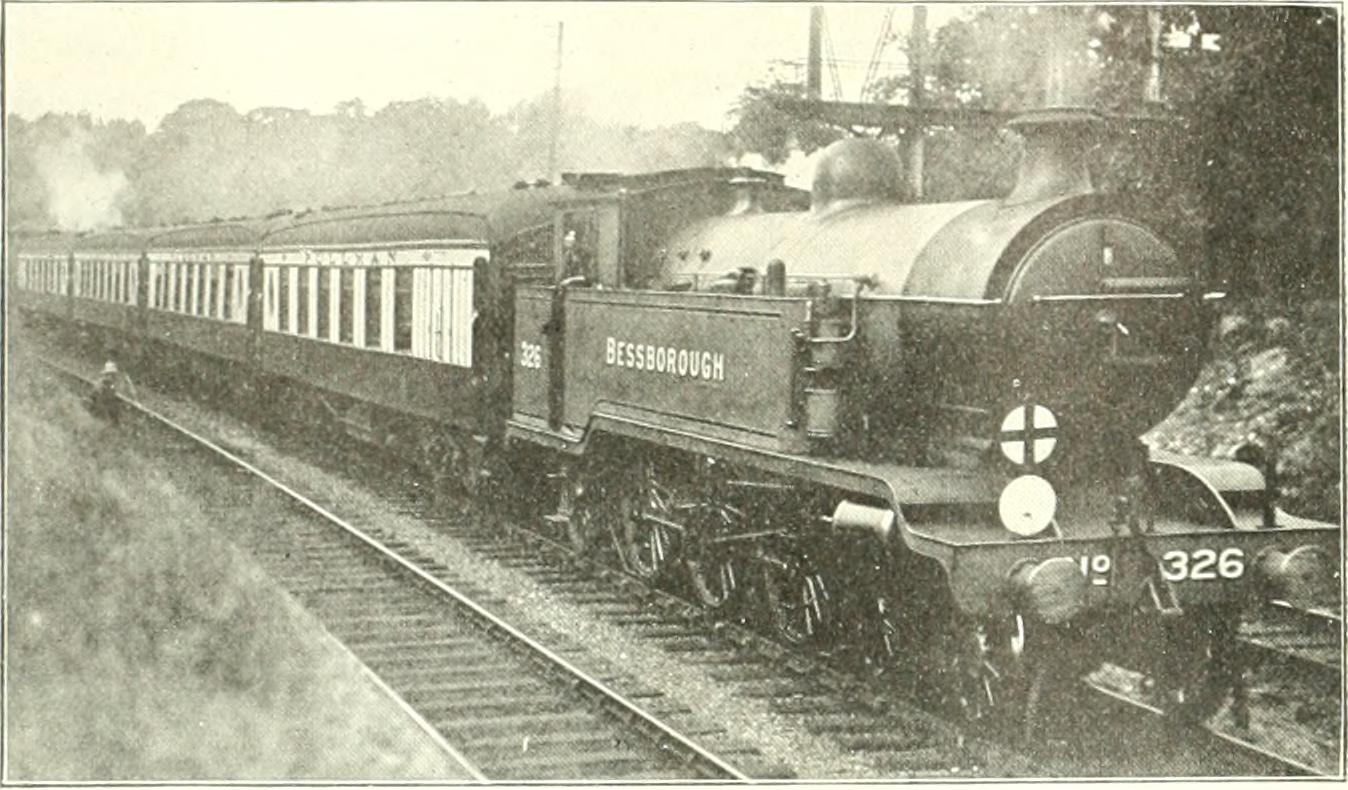
Loco No. 326 Bessborough

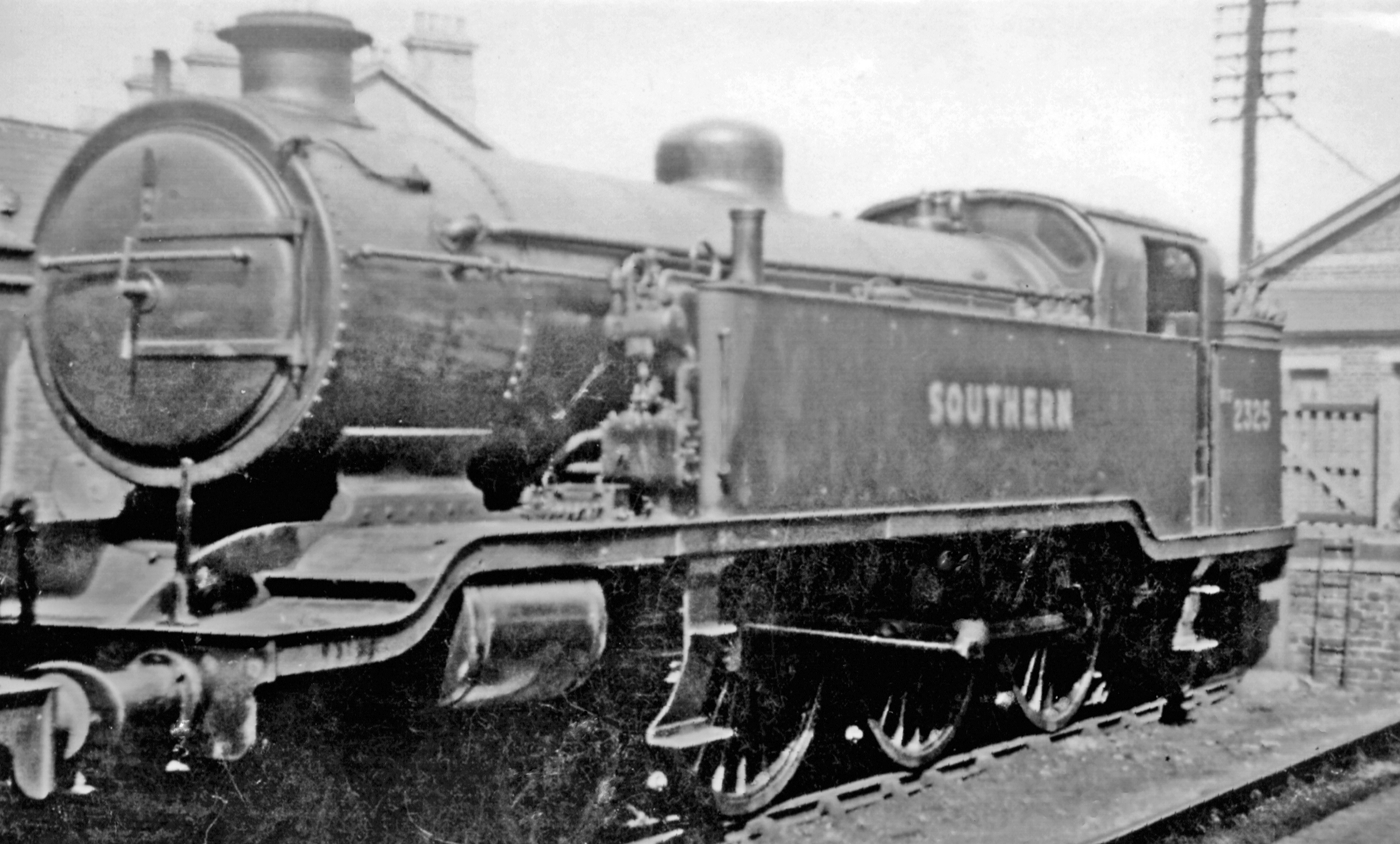
J1 4-6-2T No. 325 at Tunbridge Wells West, 1946

== Sources ==
- Bradley, D.L. (1974). Locomotives of the London Brighton and South Coast Railway: Part 3. Railway Correspondence and Travel Society.
