= Kyösti Kylälä =

Finnish engineer and inventor

Kyösti Kylälä (born Gustaf Georg Adrian Byström; 16 August 1868 in Salmi – 15 August 1936 in Viipuri) was a Finnish railroad engineer and self-taught inventor. In 1919 he patented in the UK an 'Improved means for increasing the draught in steam boilers, especially on locomotives.'

Kylälä's invention, sometimes known as the 'Kylala spreader' involved the insertion of four nozzles in the blastpipe of steam locomotives. The system was originally devised to reduce spark-throwing and later it was claimed that there was a more even draught over the tubeplate and that the need for tube-cleaning was reduced. It was tried out in 1922 by Lawson Billinton on a LB&SCR K class locomotive, but with only limited success.

Later the French engineer André Chapelon, developed and improved the invention by using a second-stage nozzle and adopted the name Kylchap for this design. Kylchap exhausts are found on many French and British locomotives notably the Flying Scotsman and the world record holding Mallard.
