= Alfred Schack =

Alfred Schack (1895 – 1978) was a German inventor and entrepreneur.

== Life and work ==
Alfred Schack was the son of the protestant pastor Albert Schack and had five siblings. He visited the high school and showed already in his school time great interest in physics, mathematics and electricity.

In World War I, he served as volunteer at the front from 1914 to 1918. Shortly before end of war, he was taken prisoner and spent one year in English captivity. After his release, he started studying physics at the University of Königsberg and as of 1920 at the Technische Hochschule Danzig. In his last semester he was assistant at the Physikalische Institut in Danzig and passed his diploma examination in Technical Physics.

In 1922, Schack moved to Düsseldorf and became one year later an employee at the fuel and power department of the Verein Deutscher Eisenhüttenleute (Association of German Steel Manufacturers). In the same year, he married Dorothea Schuhmacher, with whom he had three children.

In 1924, he wrote his dissertation “Über die Strahlung der Feuergase und ihre praktische Umsetzung” (About the Radiation of Firing Gases and their practical Implementation). Emphasis was on proving that heat transfer in firing systems neither takes place through radiation nor by contact. In those days, this theory was strongly doubted among the experts – nevertheless, his thesis could not be refuted and Schack gained wide recognition in the world of science.

In 1929, the pioneer work “Der industrielle Wärmeübergang” (The Industrial Heat Transfer) was published. This educational book providing practical knowledge for engineers was continuously revised and extended in the following years.

On July 14, 1931, Schack established the company Rekuperator KG Dr.-Ing. Schack & Co., with the support of Demag AG. In 1935, Schack was given the order to construct a steel recuperator by the company Röchling-Werke, which would go down in history as the largest plant of its kind ever built at that time. Other important units followed, such as the world's first Siemens Martin oven with recuperator heating and the world's first hot air oven in 1939.

Schack habilitated in 1951 at the Technische Hochschule (Technical University) in Aachen and worked there as a lecturer for over 15 years. In 1959, he was appointed as extracurricular professor.

In 1970, Alfred Schack designated his son Kurtreiner Schack as sole managing director of his company. In 1995, Rekuperator KG, Dr.-Ing. Schack & Co. merged with Schmidt’sche Heissdampf-Gesellschaft mbH into SHG Schack GmbH. Today, the company is worldwide operating under the name ARVOS.

== Books ==
- Rekuperator KG: 50 Jahre Rekuperator KG, Dr. Ing Schack & Co., Düsseldorf 1981
