= LB&SCR H2 class =

British steam locomotive

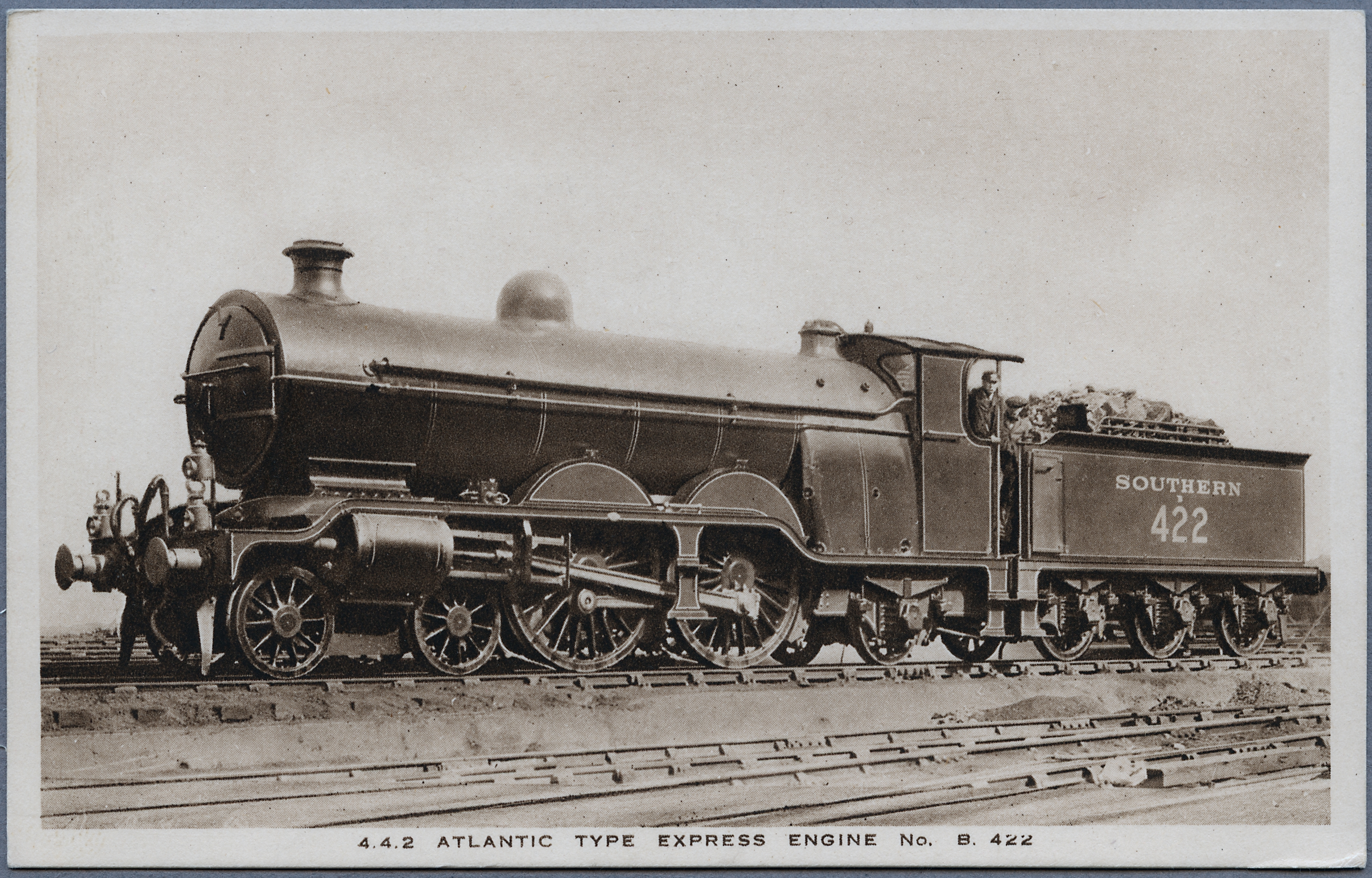
- H2 seen in Southern Railway livery
Type and origin
- Power type: Steam
- Designer: D. E. Marsh/L. B. Billinton
- Builder: Brighton Works
- Build date: 1911–1912, 2024
- Total produced: 6 + 1 replica
Specifications
- Configuration
  - Whyte: 4-4-2
- Gauge: 4 ft 8 1/2 in (1,435 mm) standard gauge
- Leading dia.: 3 ft 6 in (1.067 m)
- Driver dia.: 6 ft 7 1/2 in (2.019 m)
- Loco weight: 69 long tons 5 cwt (155,100 lb or 70.4 t) (77.6 short tons)
- Fuel type: Coal
- Boiler pressure: 170 psi (1.17 MPa); 200 psi (1.38 MPa) (1938)
- Cylinders: Two, outside
- Cylinder size: 21 in × 26 in (533 mm × 660 mm)
Performance figures
- Tractive effort: 20,800 lbf (92.5 kN); 24,000 lbf (106.8 kN) (1938)
Career
- Operators: London, Brighton and South Coast Railway; Southern Railway; British Railways
- Class: H2
- Power class: BR: 4P
- Withdrawn: 1949, 1956–1958
- Disposition: All original locomotives scrapped, 1 replica in service

The London, Brighton and South Coast Railway H2 class is a class of 4-4-2 steam locomotives for express passenger work. They were designed when D. E. Marsh was officially Locomotive Superintendent, and were built at Brighton Works in 1911 and 1912. As Marsh had worked on the Great Northern Railway as Chief Assistant to Henry Ivatt, the design closely followed that of the GNR Class C1 (large boiler). The entire class was scrapped by British Railways by the late 1950s, but a replica entered service on the Bluebell Railway in 2024.

== Background ==
In 1911, D. E. Marsh was on leave of absence due to sickness, and his assistant Lawson Billinton was granted authority to construct a further six 4-4-2 'Atlantic' locomotives similar to the Marsh H1 class but incorporating the Schmidt superheater.

== Construction and use ==
The new H2 class locomotives built by Brighton railway works and introduced between June 1911 and January 1912. They were an immediate success and shared with the H1 class the London to Brighton express trains including the heavily loaded Pullman services the Brighton Limited, and the Southern Belle, which the LB&SCR described as "the most luxurious train in the World".

As with the non-superheated class they were gradually replaced on the London-Brighton express trains in 1925/6 by the "King Arthur" and "River" classes, but there was still plenty of work for them on other express services, including boat trains connecting with the Newhaven-Dieppe ferry service. At the same time they were all named after geographical features of the south coast.

Oliver Bulleid, familiar with the class from his time at the LNER, increased the boiler pressure of the H2 class from 170 psi to 200 psi starting in 1938 to match the H1.

Following the cessation of the cross-channel ferries after 1940 as a result of the Second World War, the class was left with little work to do and several were put into storage or moved elsewhere to miscellaneous duties in southern England. The H2 class however returned to the boat trains after the end of the war and continued until the mid-1950s.

== Withdrawal ==
One member of the class was withdrawn in 1949, but the remainder continued in regular use until 1956. No. 32424 "Beachy Head" was the last survivor; it was withdrawn in April 1958 and none were preserved.

== Beachy Head replica ==
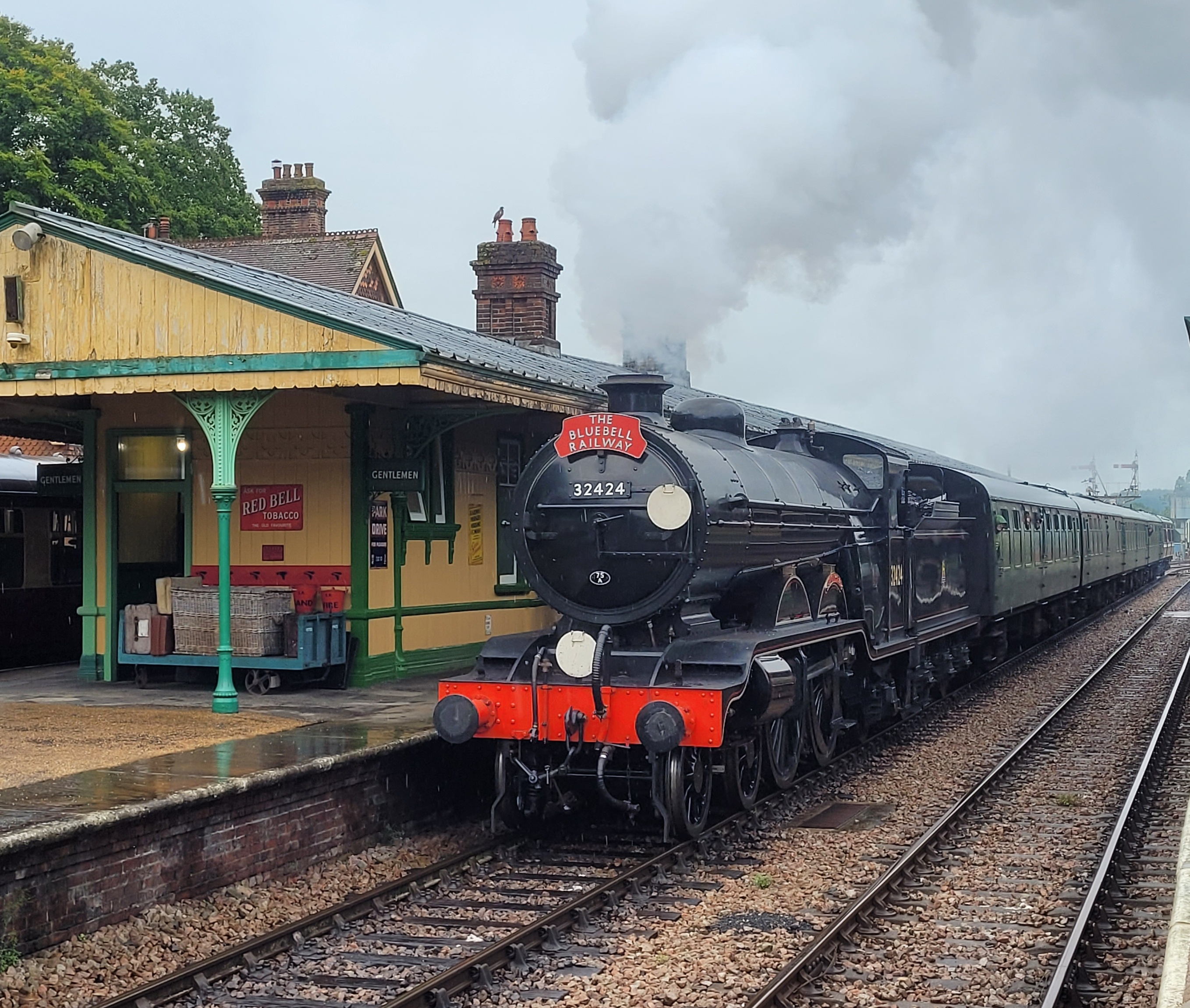
The newly completed locomotive passing through Horsted Keynes on its second day in public service, 23 August 2024

No examples of the original H2 class were preserved, however on 29 October 2000 the Bluebell Railway announced its intention to reconstruct a replica of SR/BR period Beachy Head. By then, many surviving locomotive parts had been assembled including an ex-GNR 'Atlantic' boiler, and an ex-LB&SCR B4 class tender chassis. The boiler was tested around August 2018. The locomotive rolled out and was coupled to its tender on 5 March 2024, to begin commissioning work prior to entering service, which it did on 18 August 2024.

== Models ==
Bachmann Branchline:-

- 31-920 No. 2421 South Foreland in Southern Railway olive green livery;
- 31-921A No. 32425 Trevose Head in BR black livery with early emblem.
- 31-922 No. 422 in LB&SCR Lined Umber.

== Locomotive Summary ==
H2 class fleet summary
LB&SC Number	S.R. Number	B.R. Number	Name	Built	Withdrawal	Image
421	2421	32421	South Foreland	June 1911	August 1956	
422	2422	32422	North Foreland	July 1911	September 1956	
423	2423	32423	The Needles	September 1911	May 1949	
424	2424	32424	Beachy Head	September 1911	April 1958	
425	2425	32425	Trevose Head	December 1911	September 1956	
426	2426	32426	St. Alban's Head	January 1912	August 1956	
-	-	32424	Beachy Head	August 2024	In service	

== Sources ==
=== Bibliography ===
- Bradley, D.L. (1974) Locomotives of the London Brighton and South Coast Railway Part 3, Railway Correspondence and Travel Society.
- English, Jeremy (2014). LBSCR Atlantics. Ian Allan. ISBN 978-0-7110-3791-5.
