= Schmidtsche Schack =

German manufacturing company

Schmidtsche Schack - ARVOS
- Company type: Privately held company
- Industry: Manufacturing
- Predecessor: Schmidt'sche Heissdampf Gesellschaft mbH
- Founded: 1910, Kassel
- Founder: Wilhelm Schmidt
- Headquarters: Kassel, Germany
- Key people: CEO: Karsten Stueckrath
- Products: Industrial chemical engineering process equipment
- Brands: Schmidt'sche products; Schack products; Zero.One
- Revenue: (335 Mio Euro)
- Owner: Triton Partners
- Subsidiaries: Düsseldorf (Germany); Wexford (US); Houston (US); Kobe (JP); Singapore; Shanghai (CN); Mumbai (IND)
- Website: www.schmidtsche-schack.com

Schmidtsche Schack - ARVOS is a German enterprise with headquarters and fabrication facilities in Kassel. The company also operates a branch office in Düsseldorf and has affiliated units in the US, Japan, and Singapore.

It originates from Schmidt’sche Heissdampf-Gesellschaft mbH, which was founded by Wilhelm Schmidt in 1910. The firm belongs to the ARVOS Group and is a world leader in process gas cooling systems for the chemical, petrochemical, and metallurgical industries. In the fiscal year 2018, the sales figure amounted to approximately 335 million euros.

== History ==
=== Company history in the 19th century ===
In 1880, before the company Schmidt’sche Heissdampf-Gesellschaft was founded, the engineer Wilhelm Schmidt had begun developing steam engines. In 1887 he sold the first patented licence for a hot steamship engine to the German shipbuilders Blohm+Voss in Hamburg. Three years later, businesses with patented licences for hot steam technology began to flourish. In 1895, Wilhelm Schmidt acquired the majority share of Ascherslebener Maschinenfabrik, which was converted into a joint stock company in 1898, of which Schmidt took over a mandate in the supervisory board. The first two hot steam locomotives equipped with the Schmidt’sche superheater system were delivered to the Preußische Eisenbahngesellschaft (German railway company) via Vulkan AG Stettin, and Henschel & Son in Kassel. Further companies selling patent rights in superheater technologies were established in England in 1899.

=== The first half of the 20th century ===
In 1900, the first Schmidt’sche hot steam locomotive was presented at the world exhibition in Paris and won a prize. In 1902, railway companies in Europe and abroad modified their railroad engines and adopted the Schmidt’sche hot steam technology.

In 1910, Schmidt’sche Heissdampf-Gesellschaft mbH was established in Kassel-Wilhelmshoehe. Further businesses selling licences for superheater technology in the US, England, and France followed. At that time, about 5,000 locomotives with hot steam technology were operated in Germany and abroad. A high-pressure piston steam engine with four cylinders was invented.

The Schmidt-Hartmann high-pressure boiler was introduced in 1925; it dominated the German boiler market for more than two decades. A small-tube superheater system for narrow gauge locomotives developed in 1927 and spread across Europe. In 1928, Henschel & Son built the first three-cylinder high-pressure compound locomotive H17206 based on Schmidt’sche Heissdampf's design.

In World War II the administration and testing buildings suffered extensive destruction, and the workshop was destroyed in 1945. Rebuilding started in 1946, mainly by its employees. In 1950 the manufacturing facility moved from Kassel to Goettingen. In the following years, boilers for different capacities and pressures, as well as induced draught systems, were built.

=== The second half of the 20th century ===
In 1955, a new superheater that can produce hot steam over 400 °C was introduced. Henschel & Son was the first company to apply this technology before it was adopted worldwide. In the same year, Wiesbadener Westofen GmbH, a subsidiary of Didier Werke AG, took over the joint capital from Schmidt's heritages and became the new owner.

During research, the first process gas cooler for ethylene plants was developed in 1959 based on the double tube system of hot steam locomotives. 1960 this system was installed and successfully tested at Rheinische Olefinwerke Wesseling near Cologne. In the same year, the last Schmidt’sche hot steam locomotive was taken out of service at the Deutsche Bundesbahn. The destroyed office building in Kassel-Wilhelmshoehe was rebuilt, and the administration and manufacturing site in Kassel-Bettenhausen was established in 1964. From 1970 onwards it became the new site for the company, and the site in Goettingen was relinquished.

In 1979, Energie- und Verfahrenstechnik GmbH (EVT), a company from Stuttgart active in the field of firing technology, took over the shares in Schmidt’sche Heissdampf-Gesellschaft from Didier AG. The Alsthom Group acquired EVT with all affiliates in 1989.

In 1995, Schmidt’sche Heissdampf-Gesellschaft merged with the company Rekuperator Schack GmbH from Düsseldorf. The name of this amalgamation was initially SHG Schack GmbH before changing to ALSTOM Energy Systems SHG GmbH three years later.

=== 21st century ===
In 2000, the company was renamed Abb Alstom Power SHG GmbH and then ALSTOM Power Energy Recovery GmbH. This name remained until 2014 when it was changed to Schmidtsche Schack - ARVOS.

== Products ==
The company manufactures equipment to transfer process heat at temperatures of up to 1,500 °C and pressures up to 300 bar, such as:

- Process gas coolers for ethylene processes
- Synthesis gas coolers for coal and biomass liquefaction
- Process gas cooling systems for hydrogen, methanol, ammonia, and nitric acid production
- High-temperature products, e.g. air preheaters for industrial carbon black production or sludge combustion
- Fired heaters for preheating various media in many chemical and petrochemical processes

== Books ==
- Brachmann, Richard, Mit Heißdampf an die Weltspitze: Porträt eines Unternehmens; ALSTOM Power Energy Recovery GmbH vormals Schmidt'sche Heissdampf-Gesellschaft mbH; 1910 - 2010. George, Habichtswald/Kassel, 2010, ISBN 978-3-934752-06-1
- Literature by and about Schmidtsche Schack in the German National Library catalogue Cassel : Selbstverl., 1913
