= LB&SCR L class =

British steam locomotive class (1914–1936)

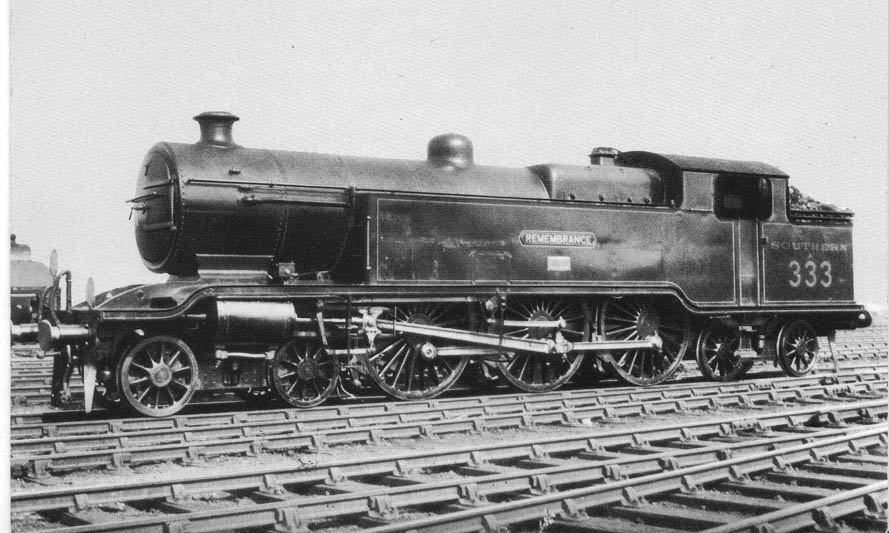
- No. 333 'Remembrance' early in Southern Railway ownership. c. 1925
Type and origin
- Power type: Steam
- Designer: L.B. Billinton
- Builder: Brighton Works
- Build date: 1914, 1921–1922
- Total produced: 7
Specifications
- Configuration
  - Whyte: 4-6-4T
- Gauge: 4 ft 8 1/2 in (1,435 mm) standard gauge
- Leading dia.: 3 ft 6 in (1.067 m)
- Driver dia.: 6 ft 9 in (2.057 m)
- Trailing dia.: 3 ft 6 in (1.067 m)
- Loco weight: 99 long tons (101 t; 111 short tons)
- Fuel type: Coal
- Fuel capacity: 3 long tons (3.0 t; 3.4 short tons)
- Water cap.: 2,686 to 2,713 imp gal (12,210 to 12,330 L; 3,226 to 3,258 US gal)
- Boiler pressure: 170 psi (11.72 bar; 1.17 MPa)
- Cylinders: Two, outside
- Cylinder size: 22 in × 28 in (559 mm × 711 mm)
Performance figures
- Tractive effort: 24,176 lbf (107.54 kN)
Career
- Class: L
- Last run: 1934–36
- Disposition: All rebuilt to SR N15X class

The LB&SCR L Class was a class of 4-6-4 steam tank locomotives designed by L. B. Billinton for the London, Brighton and South Coast Railway. They were known as the "Brighton Baltics", Baltic being the European name for the 4-6-4 wheel arrangement. Seven examples were built between April 1914 and April 1922 and they were used for express passenger services.

== Background ==
By 1913, the LB&SCR was well supplied with modern passenger locomotives except for the heaviest express trains. L. B. Billinton was undecided whether to enlarge the J1 and J2 4-6-2 tank locomotives designed by his predecessor D. E. Marsh, or design an equivalent sized 4-6-0 tender locomotive. Large tank locomotives were well-suited to the railway's operating conditions, with a relatively short but very intensely used system, particularly in the vicinity of London.

Billinton therefore placed an order for one 4-6-4 tank and one 4-6-0 tender locomotive from Brighton railway works in November 1913. However soon after the delivery of the first tank engine in April 1914, the order for the 4-6-0 was changed to another tank engine. The four trailing bogie wheels were added to enable more fuel to be carried and to give additional stability when running bunker-first.

== Modification and further deliveries ==
Soon after the first two examples were introduced into traffic, the class was found to be unstable at high speed and prone to derailment, due to water surging in the large side tanks. As a result, the two locomotives were soon rebuilt to provide a large well tank between the axles, and to blank off the upper portion of the side tanks. This lowered their centre of gravity for smoother running. Once modified the first two locomotives proved to very successful, but further deliveries were delayed by the onset of the First World War. Five more examples were built between October 1921 and April 1922. No. 333 Remembrance was the last new locomotive built by the London, Brighton and South Coast Railway, before it became a part of the Southern Railway on 1 January 1923. It was named in honour of the members of the railway killed in the war.

== Post grouping ==
The original Robinson superheaters were replaced by those of Richard Maunsell's design during the 1920s and 1930s, and the original LB&SCR numbers were increased by 2000. The seven members of the class were kept fully occupied on the main express services between London and Brighton until the line was electrified in 1933. They were then transferred to Eastbourne to work on London expresses in January 1933, but the planned electrification of that line soon made them redundant once again.

== N15X Class ==
As the locomotives were still relatively new and performing well, Maunsell decided to rebuild them for use on express trains on the Western section of Southern Railway. Between December 1934 and April 1936 all seven members of the class were rebuilt as 4-6-0 tender locomotives, and given the new designation ‘’N15X’’. Five of the class were renamed after famous locomotive engineers but 2329 and 2333 retained their original names.

The new class were based at Nine Elms and were used on services to Bournemouth and Southampton but in their rebuilt state they did not perform as well as the existing King Arthur class and so tended to be relegated to secondary services. Between November 1941 and July 1943 the class was loaned to the Great Western Railway for use on freight trains.

== British Railways ==
All seven N15X locomotives entered British Railways stock on 1 January 1948 and continued to be used on secondary services until the mid-1950s. The first withdrawal took place in January 1955, and the last in July 1957. No examples have been preserved.

== Locomotive summary ==
LB&SCR No.	S.R. No.	B.R. No.	LBSC Name	Date Built	Date Rebuilt	SR Name	Withdrawn
327	2327	32327	Charles C. Macrae	March 1914	April 1935	Trevithick	January 1956
328	2328	32328	—	September 1914	February 1936	Hackworth	January 1955
329	2329	32329	Stephenson	October 1921	December 1934	Stephenson	July 1956
330	2330	32330	—	December 1921	September 1935	Cudworth	August 1955
331	2331	32331	—	December 1921	April 1936	Beattie	July 1957
332	2332	32332	—	March 1922	November 1935	Stroudley	January 1956
333	2333	32333	Remembrance	April 1922	June 1935	Remembrance	April 1956

No. 333 was the LB&SCR war memorial locomotive, and bore a plaque reading "In grateful remembrance of the 532 men of the L.B.&S.C.Rly, who gave their lives for their country, 1914–1919".
