= Lancing Carriage Works =

Coordinates: 50.823°N 0.331°W

Lancing Carriage Works was a railway carriage and wagon building and maintenance facility in the village of Lancing near Shoreham-by-Sea in the county of West Sussex in England from 1911 until 1965.

== History under the LB&SCR ==
The cramped situation of Brighton railway works and the lack of space to expand was a constant problem for the chief engineers of London, Brighton and South Coast Railway (LB&SCR). In 1902 it was decided to move the carriage and wagon works to Lancing to relieve the pressure on Brighton and in 1905 the company purchased land at Lancing to add to its existing holding giving 66 acres (270,000 m^{2}) for a works. The works were constructed in 1907–10, with wagon production started in 1909 and carriage production in early 1912 with many employees transferred from Brighton.

Because of the rural situation of the new factory the railway operated a special daily train from Brighton for the workforce. This became known familiarly as the Lancing Belle.

In 1913, L. B. Billinton, the Chief Mechanical Engineer, presented proposals to the LB&SCR board to close the Brighton works and concentrate all locomotive building and repair at Lancing, but the advent of World War I in 1914 put an end to this plan.

== Grouping ==
Following the merger of the LB&SCR and other railways in southern England to form the Southern Railway as part of the Railways Act grouping of 1923, the Lancing works became one of three such facilities owned by the new railway, the others being at Ashford and Eastleigh. The new railway decided to concentrate carriage construction at Lancing and close the carriage works at Ashford. As a result, 500 workmen and their families eventually moved to Lancing.

In 1927, a new moving 'assembly line' system was introduced for repairing coaches more efficiently. A plan of the works, dating from 1931, shows large carriage and paint shops, together with smaller shops for springs, frames, wheels, gas and brakes, accumulator cells. There was also a traverser between the roads of the carriage shop, and a separate shop for Pullman cars.

During World War II the works was kept busy repairing bomb damaged carriages and wagons and in converting carriages to mobile hospitals to support the army during the D-Day invasion. The works were also involved in constructing Bailey bridges and the tailplanes for Airspeed Horsa gliders for the invasion.

== British Railways and Closure ==
The works continued to operate after the nationalisation of British Railways (BR) in 1948, and gained a reputation for its efficiency and industrial harmony. By the 1960s, over 1,500 employees worked at Lancing. In 1962, efforts to rationalise BR's manufacturing capacity resulted in the decision to close Lancing in favour of Eastleigh railway works. Many of those concerned felt the decision to close Lancing rather than Eastleigh was for political rather than economic reasons, due to Eastleigh being a marginal Parliamentary constituency in the 'sixties that the Government of Harold Macmillan was fearful of losing, whilst Lancing fell within a 'safe' Conservative Parliamentary seat. The run down of the carriage works took place over the next three years, with final closure coming on 25 June 1965.

== Subsequent use of the site ==
West Sussex County Council purchased the site, which became the Churchill Industrial Estate. The original carriage shop remained in 2002, occupied by a furniture manufacturer.

== Departmental motive power ==
The works had a number of small locomotives used for shunting purposes. These included LB&SCR A1/A1X classes nos. DS 680 and 681, a four-wheeled petrol locomotive DS499, and two SR USA class locomotives DS 236 and 237.
