= LB&SCR K class =

Class of mixed traffic steam engines

London Brighton and South Coast Railway K class
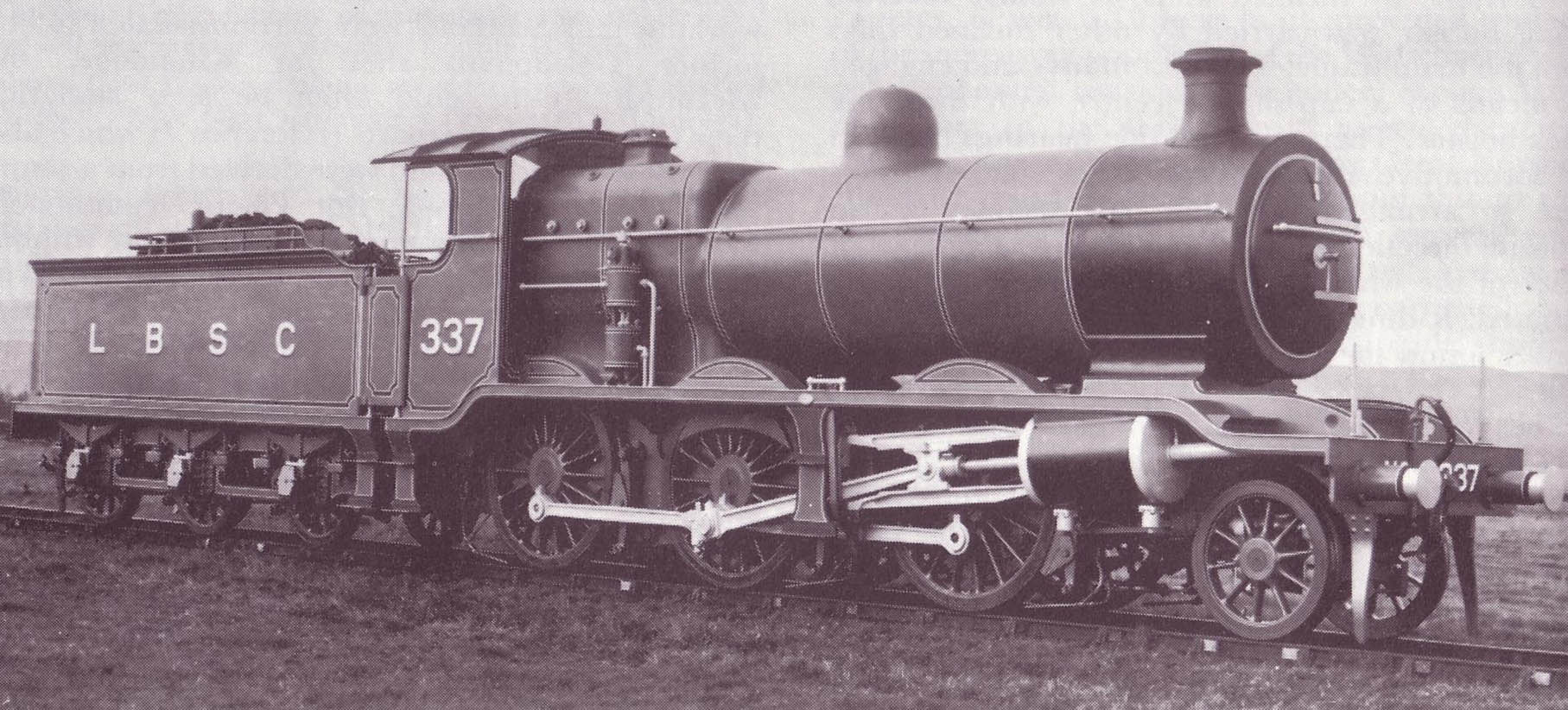
- K class No. 337 as built
Type and origin
- Power type: Steam
- Designer: L. B. Billinton
- Builder: Brighton Works
- Build date: 1913–1921
- Total produced: 17 (completed); 3 (abandoned, partially built)
Specifications
- Configuration
  - Whyte: 2-6-0
  - UIC: 1'C
- Gauge: 4 ft 8 1/2 in (1,435 mm) standard gauge
- Leading dia.: 3 ft 6 in (1.067 m)
- Driver dia.: 5 ft 6 in (1.676 m)
- Wheelbase: 23 ft 9 in (7.24 m)
- Length: 57 ft 10 in (17.63 m)
- Total weight: 105 long tons 5 cwt or 106.9 t or 117.9 short tons full
- Fuel type: Coal
- Fuel capacity: 4 long tons or 4.1 t or 4.5 short tons
- Water cap.: 3,940 imp gal (17,900 L; 4,730 US gal)
- Firebox
  - Grate area: 24.8 sq ft (2.30 m^{2})
- Boiler pressure: 170 psi (1.17 MPa)
- Heating surface
  - Tubes: 1,155 sq ft (107.30 m^{2})
  - Total surface: 1,573 sq ft (146.14 m^{2})
- Superheater: Robinson
- Cylinders: Two, outside
- Cylinder size: 21 in × 26 in (533 mm × 660 mm)
- Valve type: Piston
- Valve travel: 4 in (101.60 mm)
Performance figures
- Tractive effort: 25,104 lbf (111.7 kN)
Career
- Operators: London, Brighton and South Coast Railway, Southern Railway, British Railways
- Class: K
- Power class: BR: 4P/5F
- Numbers: LBSCR: 337–353; SR: B337–B353 (later 2337–2353); BR: 32337–32353
- Locale: Southern Region
- First run: February 1913
- Withdrawn: November–December 1962
- Disposition: All scrapped

The LB&SCR K class were powerful 2-6-0 mixed traffic locomotives designed by L. B. Billinton for the London, Brighton and South Coast Railway (LB&SCR) in 1913. They appeared shortly before the First World War and the first ten examples of the class did prodigious work during that conflict on munitions, supply and troop trains. Further examples were built after the war, and the class was used as a test bed for various items of specialised equipment. However, after the formation of the Southern Railway in 1923 the remaining three locomotives on order were not completed and the seventeen members of the class led relatively quiet yet reliable lives over their traditional lines. The locomotives proved their usefulness once again during the Second World War, and continued to provide reliable service until the 1960s. The entire class was eventually withdrawn in 1962 for 'bookkeeping' rather than 'operational' reasons.

== Background ==
Due to the nature of its traffic, the LB&SCR had a limited need for heavy freight locomotives. However, those it did have had to accelerate quickly from sidings and signals and maintain consistent speed to not impede the intensively used passenger lines, particularly in the London suburbs. This issue became increasingly problematic after about 1910, as suburban lines were increasingly electrified. D. E. Marsh rebuilding R. J. Billinton's C2 class with larger boilers solved this problem for a few years, but traffic continued to grow and by 1913 these occasionally needed double-heading. A more powerful design was required for the heaviest freight trains, while also addressing longer passenger trains, especially during the summer months. L. B. Billinton therefore ordered five powerful mixed-traffic locomotives from Brighton railway works to solve both issues.

== Design ==
The new 'K' class incorporated several innovations for the LB&SCR. They were the first 2-6-0 locomotives to run on the railway, and the first class to have a Belpaire firebox. They were fitted with Robinson style superheaters within a parallel boiler and two large inclined outside cylinders with inside Stephenson valve gear. The boilers were fed by hot water injectors, operated by a Weir pump, and surplus steam fed back to the tenders to preheat the water. The tenders were the largest of any LB&SCR locomotive with a capacity of 3,940 imp gal (17,900 L; 4,730 US gal) of water and 4 long tons (4.1 t; 4.5 short tons) of coal. The class was also fitted with steam sanding and steam carriage heating equipment enabling them to be used on passenger trains.

== Construction and use ==
The first two examples, numbers 337 and 338, appeared in traffic in September and December 1913, and were thoroughly tested at Brighton motive power depot. Modifications were made to the suspension of the pony truck and to the smokebox layout before three further examples (Nos. 339-341) with slightly larger smokeboxes were built between March and September 1914. The design was quickly judged to be successful and a further five were ordered, but due to the difficulties of obtaining materials during World War I they did not appear in traffic until late 1916. The last two locomotives were fitted with Billinton's own 'top feed' system which provided a moderate increase in performance and so the remainder of the class was gradually fitted with the equipment as they passed through the workshops.

The original ten locomotives proved to be extremely useful during the First World War, hauling heavy munitions and military supply trains from the marshalling yard at Three Bridges to Newhaven or Littlehampton harbours. Up to sixty supply trains a day were being handled by these two ports. The K class engines could handle trains of 1,000 long tons (1,016 t; 1,120 short tons) at 30–35 mph (48–56 km/h), but were equally useful when hauling troop trains. The railway wanted to construct more, but wartime restrictions on locomotive building prevented this.

Billinton considered designing a 2-6-2 tank locomotive 'K2' or 'N' version after the war, but this idea was dropped following discussions with the railway's Civil Engineer, who objected to the longer wheelbase necessary and the discovery that the tank engine version would only be able to carry 2,000 imp gal (9,100 L; 2,400 US gal) of water. Therefore, a further ten locomotives of the original design were ordered from Brighton works. Seven of these (nos. 347-353) appeared in traffic between December 1920 and March 1921. Progress on the remaining three locomotives was delayed due to the long backlog of repairs at Brighton works, and the decision of their completion was deferred until after the railways of southern England weregrouped into the Southern Railway in January 1923. Ultimately, they were never completed.

== Variants ==
During the last years of the LB&SCR, Billinton used members of the class to test various items of specialised equipment, most of which later proved to give limited advantage in return for higher fuel consumption or maintenance costs. In April 1921, the smokebox of No. 351 was extended to fit a 'Lewis Draft Appliance', which was removed in 1927. In March 1922, Nos. 341 and 342 were experimentally fitted with an early version of the Kylala variable blastpipe. One locomotive appeared to perform better as a result and the other worse, and so the experiment was discontinued. Between May 1922 and December 1923, No. 340 had a Worthington-Simpson feed-water heater and pump. Finally in February 1923, No. 341 was fitted with 'Lamberts wet sanding gear' but this equipment was removed in 1931 after it was found to cause additional wear on the driving wheels.

== Post-grouping ==
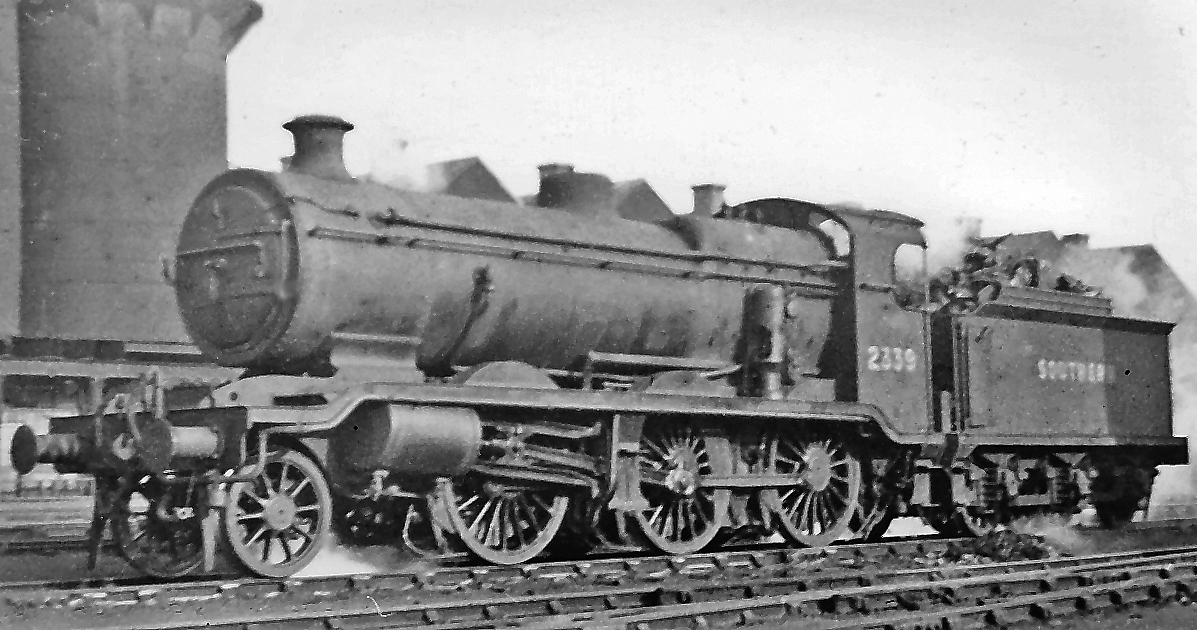
No. 2339 at Brighton Locomotive Depot 23 March 1946.

The class was initially renumbered by means of adding the prefix, 'B' to the original number, and later by adding 2000 to the LB&SCR number. They spent the first six years of Southern Railway ownership largely restricted to the lines of the Central Section, as the LB&SCR previously had a more generous loading gauge than the other main constituent companies. However, between 1929 and the summer of 1939 all the members of the class were altered to the composite gauge by reducing the height of their chimneys, flattening the dome and reducing the cab roofs, as they passed through the works.

During the spring of 1924, the class was compared with other classes of heavy freight locomotives operated by the constituent companies. They were found to be capable and reliable but more expensive to run than the alternative Maunsell N and Urie S15 classes and so no more were built. This may have been a false economy since many of the 'N' class ultimately had to undergo expensive rebuilding of their frames and the replacement of their cylinders, whereas members of the 'K' class remained in sound working order throughout their working lives.

The seventeen examples spent most of their careers between the two World Wars working on both freight and passenger duties over their traditional routes, although there was less need for the latter following the electrification of the Brighton Main Line in 1933. However, the class once again came into its own during the Second World War when the locomotives were again used on heavy freight and troop trains throughout the Southern Railway, especially in the lead up to the D-day landings in 1944.

== British Railways ==
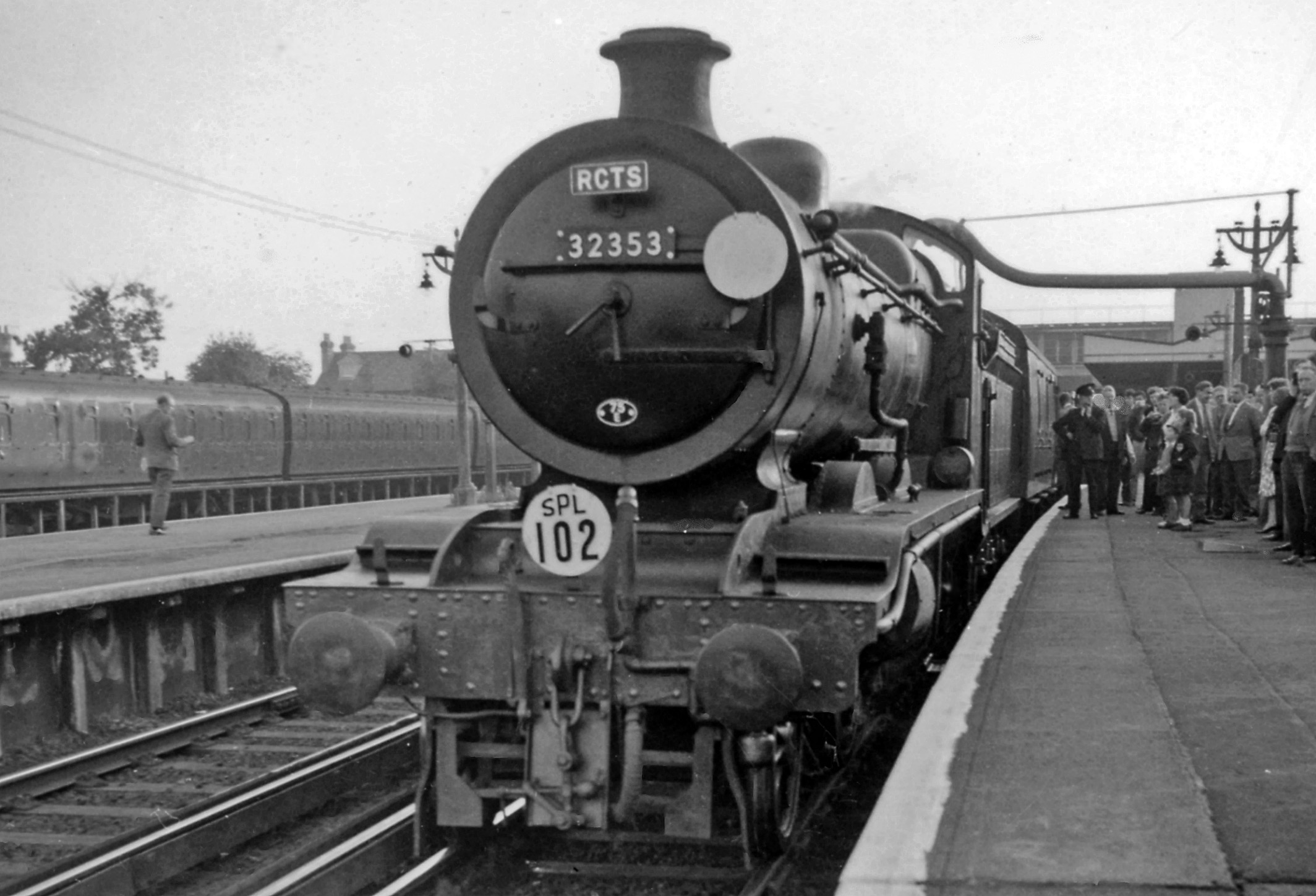
32353 at Horsham October 1962

All of the class were in good working order at the time of the nationalisation of the British Railways in 1948, and continued to be well maintained until the latter half of 1961. They were renumbered by adding 30000 to the SR number. Between 1949 and 1953 the feedwater heating was replaced by cold water injection, for reasons of cost, and latterly many examples were fitted with Automatic Warning System equipment, and water treatment equipment. With the reduction in freight traffic, they began to be also used on secondary services. However, after the summer of 1956 the class also acquired one prestige passenger duty on the Newhaven boat-trains, following the withdrawal of the 'Marsh Atlantics'.

== Accidents and incidents ==
On 3 March 1954, No. 32346 derailed at the catch points near Forest Row and landed on its left side at the embankment.

== Withdrawal ==
The locomotives were all still providing good reliable service when the class was withdrawn en-bloc during November and December 1962, apparently as part of an accountancy exercise 'to keep in line with the Southern Regions' withdrawal programme'. Most spent several months in store at Hove railway station before being broken up, and at least one had to be briefly resurrected to help run breakdown trains during the severe Winter of 1962–1963 in the United Kingdom. The early Bluebell Railway had hoped to purchase one example for preservation, but could not afford to do so since the time when they were available coincided with the years when all money had to be channelled into the purchase of the freehold of the line.

== Model ==
Lawson Billinton considered the 'K' class to be his finest design, and during his retirement he constructed a one-sixth size working model from the original drawings. This was last sold in 2003 for a price in the £40-£50,000 range.

== Assessment ==
Members of the 'K' class were considered the best mixed-traffic locomotives produced by the LB&SCR, but they never achieved the fame of the earlier passenger or tank engine classes of that railway and they had little impact on future Southern Railway locomotive design. It was only during the two World Wars that they were given the opportunity to show their true potential.

== Locomotive summary ==
K class locomotive fleet summary
LBSC No.	1st SR No.	2nd SR No.	BR No.	Date Built	Date Withdrawn	Image
337	B337	2337	32337	September 1913	December 1962	
338	B338	2338	32338	December 1913	December 1962	
339	B339	2339	32339	March 1914	November 1962	
340	B340	2340	32340	June 1914	December 1962	
341	B341	2341	32341	November 1914	December 1962	
342	B342	2342	32342	October 1916	December 1962	
343	B343	2343	32343	November 1916	December 1962	
344	B344	2344	32344	December 1916	November 1962	
345	B345	2345	32345	December 1916	December 1962	
346	B346	2346	32346	December 1916	November 1962	
347	B347	2347	32347	December 1920	December 1962	
348	B348	2348	32348	December 1920	November 1962	
349	B349	2349	32349	December 1920	November 1962	
350	B350	2350	32350	December 1920	November 1962	
351	B351	2351	32351	January 1921	November 1962	
352	B352	2352	32352	February 1921	November 1962	
353	B353	2353	32353	March 1921	December 1962	

== Liveries ==
The class have been painted in a variety of different liveries during their careers, reflecting their mixed-traffic role. For the initial trials nos. 337 and 338 were painted in red oxide, and after acceptance they were painted in dove grey, lined with black and white for the official photographs (see above). Thereafter members of the class were painted plain black by the LB&SCR. Under Southern Railway ownership three examples were painted in lined umber, and others in passenger green and lined black. During the Second World War they were either painted in unlined dark green or black. Under British Railways the usual livery was lined black.
