= Brighton railway works =

Railway workshops in Brighton, Sussex, England

Coordinates: 50°49′55″N 0°8′19″W

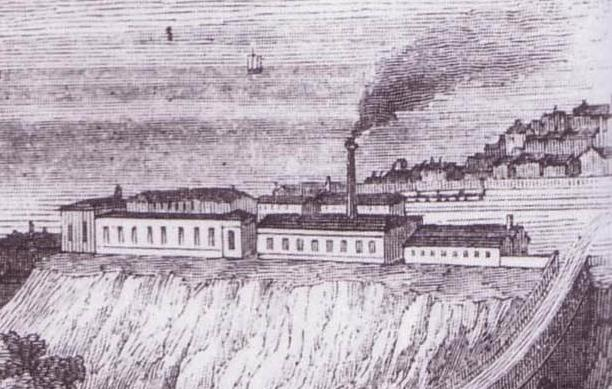
The works in 1846 (detail from an engraving of London Road viaduct).

Brighton railway works (also known as Brighton locomotive works, or just the Brighton works) was one of the earliest railway-owned locomotive repair works, founded in 1840 by the London and Brighton Railway in Brighton, England, and thus pre-dating the more famous railway works at Crewe, Doncaster and Swindon. The works grew steadily between 1841 and 1900 but efficient operation was always hampered by the restricted site, and there were several plans to close it and move the facility elsewhere. Nevertheless, between 1852 and 1957 more than 1200 steam locomotives as well as prototype diesel electric and electric locomotives were constructed there, before the eventual closure of the facility in 1962.

After use as a factory for constructing bubble cars, the facility was demolished and has since been redeveloped as part of the New England Quarter of Brighton.

== London and Brighton Railway ==
The earliest locomotive servicing facility at Brighton was a small engine shed to the north-west of the station, serving the Brighton – Shoreham line of the London and Brighton Railway in May 1840. The following year, with the completion of the London – Brighton Main Line, the railway opened a larger repair facility and motive power depot on the eastern side of the main line adjacent to the Brighton railway station. However a new workshop at Horley, midway between London and Brighton, also opened in 1841, was then planned to become the principal locomotive and carriage workshop of the new railway.

== London Brighton and South Coast Railway ==
Following his appointment as the Locomotive Superintendent of the successor company, the London Brighton and South Coast Railway (LB&SCR) in November 1847, John Chester Craven changed the plan of moving the works to Horley. Carriage construction began in 1848, having previously been carried out by contractors at New Cross. Craven also set about enlarging and equipping Brighton works for new steam locomotive construction, which began in May 1852. However the situation of the works, close to the main line, on top of a cliff, in what would soon become a built-up area, always imposed restrictions on the space available for its efficient operation.

=== Expansion 1860–1900 ===
During 1860 and 1861 Craven began the removal of a large chalk hill on the western side of the main line, which had been dumped during the construction of the main line. The space created was used to accommodate a new much enlarged motive power depot in 1861, thereby permitting the closure of the existing facilities and their incorporation into the works proper. Nevertheless, by 1866 consideration was again being given to concentrating repairs at New Cross Gate railway station.

In the 1870s William Stroudley considered moving the works to the site at Horley once again, but instead moved the carriage repair shed and paint shops to new sites on the western side of the main line, and transferred the marine engineering work undertaken by the works to a new facility in Newhaven. This allowed for the further enlargement of the locomotive building and repair facilities, including the addition of an iron foundry in 1873, and a new carriage painting and cleaning shop in 1878, and a coppersmith's shop in 1881. This new construction solved the problem for a while, but did not address the underlying issue of the inadequate site so that by the end of the century the works was again suffering from serious difficulties affecting its efficient operation.

=== Crisis at Brighton ===
From 1905 Brighton works was unable to keep pace with the locomotives requiring to be serviced, and backlogs began to build up. As a result, the LB&SCR established concentrations of locomotives awaiting entry to the works or else scrapping at East Grinstead, Horsted Keynes and Horley. An outside investigation in 1908, conducted by Robert Urie, then Works Manager of Nine Elms Works found 108 of the LB&SCR's 541 locomotives (20%) were awaiting or under repair, and that a general overhaul at Brighton took 43 days, compared with 7.2% of the locomotives of the South Eastern and Chatham Railway under repair and 21 days taken by Ashford Works. By 1910 30% of the locomotive stock was unusable due to delays and inefficiencies at Brighton works.

Lawson Billinton, the District Locomotive Superintendent at New Cross depot had sought to alleviate the situation by executing repairs and boiler changes, but this had little impact on the problem. The LB&SCR Locomotive, Carriage and Wagon Superintendent D.E. Marsh received much of the blame for the problem, which had been developing for some years, and he was granted leave of absence due to sickness in 1910, followed by his resignation in July 1911. Billinton had been invited to take over on a temporary basis during Marsh's sickness, and promptly set about re-organising the works and reducing the backlog by using emerging time and motion study techniques.

=== Plans to move the works ===
The LB&SCR directors recognised that part of the problem at Brighton was that the works was overwhelmed with work. In 1910 they purchased land at Lancing for a new carriage and wagon works, which was opened in 1912. This allowed Stroudley's carriage shed to be used as an overflow 'stock shed' by the locomotive works and the motive power depot. Locomotives repaired at Brighton were also sometimes taken to Lancing for their final painting.

Once confirmed in his post as Locomotive Superintendent in 1913 Billinton presented proposals to the LB&SCR board to close Brighton works and concentrate all locomotive building and repair at a new facility adjacent to the carriage works at Lancing. However the advent of the First World War in 1914 put an end to this plan.

Locomotive building was severely curtailed at Brighton after 1916 and the works became involved in munitions production. After the war there was again a substantial backlog of repairs and new construction did not resume until late 1920.

== Grouping & impending closure ==
Following the grouping of the LB&SCR and other railways in southern England to form the Southern Railway, in 1923, much of the new locomotive construction for the new railway was transferred to the more modern facilities at Eastleigh Works. After mid-1931, with the impending electrification of the Brighton Main Line, the locomotive works once again seemed likely to close. Many of the skilled workmen and much of the equipment were transferred to Eastleigh and Ashford, the Paint Shop was converted into an Electric multiple unit maintenance facility, and the former carriage shed was converted for use by the Southern Railway's new Road Motor Engineers Department. Similarly the steam motive power depot was rebuilt and reduced in size.

=== The Second World War and Revival ===
Fears of possible air attacks on Ashford and Eastleigh together with the need for more steam locomotive and armaments construction during World War II brought about the re-opening and re-equipment of the workshops in 1941. Throughout the remaining years of the war Brighton works was used for locomotive construction, initially for the Southern Railway, but also later for the War Department, the London, Midland and Scottish Railway and the London and North Eastern Railway. It also manufactured component parts for tanks and anti-aircraft guns. The workshops were damaged during the "Brighton Blitz" in May 1943 but soon repaired.

== British Railways and closure ==
In the decade after the nationalisation of British Railways(BR) in 1948 Brighton works was again used for new locomotive construction, being responsible for both design work and construction of several of the new BR Standard classes. At the time of the centenary of locomotive building in 1952 the works covered 9 acres (36,000 m^{2}) and employed about 650 staff. However, under the modernisation plan for BR announced in 1954, Brighton Works was once again passed over. Locomotive building ceased in 1957, and locomotive repairs ceased the following year. The buildings were closed in 1962 and demolished in 1969. The motive power depot was officially closed 15 June 1961, but remained in use for stabling steam locomotives until 1964, and was demolished in 1966.

== Later uses of the site ==
After the closure of the main works, part of the workshop was used for the building of Isetta microcars between 1957 and 1964 and some of the land remained in railway use, associated with the stabling of electric multiple unit trains and other maintenance functions. Much of the land later became a large open car park, and was used for a popular market every Sunday morning. Some land on the eastern side was given over to an assortment of retail units including a number of car dealers with temporary structures being the predominant building type, and a strip below the yard was used for retail premises; behind these remained the stone and brick columns over which the yard had been extended when space was at a premium. Much of the land which was not suitable for use either by lock-up traders or for car parking or still in use by British Rail was left derelict. The final traces of the locomotive works vanished with the demolition of the elevated 1930s Southern Railway signal box in the mid-1980s, the signal box having used part of the main locomotive erecting-shop wall as support.

In the early years of the 21st century the site has finally seen redevelopment begin, and it lies at the heart of the New England Quarter.

== Organisation of the works ==
A report of a visit to the works by members of the Institution of Mechanical Engineers in 1947 described the arrangement of the works and the cranes and other mechanical equipment used. The works were then organised into:

- a boiler shop (then building new boilers for SR West Country class)
- an erecting shop (building West Country class locomotives and reconditioning of War Department "Austerity" locomotives for use on S.R. and L.N.E.R.)
- a machine shop
- a fitting shop to deal with the repairs to axle boxes, motion parts, boiler mountings, and other details.
- a coppersmith
- a pipe-fitting shop
- a light plating shop (for building smokeboxes and boiler clothing)
- a small welding shop to deal with welded details other than boilers
- a small brass foundry

The works was supplied with compressed air for pneumatic drilling, riveting, and chipping hammers; a hydraulic plant for the 250-ton plate flanging press and a 20-ton press; and both alternating and direct electric current.

== Locomotive construction at Brighton ==
The first locomotive to be constructed at Brighton was a 2-2-2, No.14. Thereafter Brighton works was responsible for the design and construction of a large proportion of the locomotives operated by the LB&SCR under the engineers Craven, William Stroudley, R. J. Billinton, D. E. Marsh and L. B. Billinton.

=== London Brighton and South Coast Railway ===
Notable locomotive types constructed at Brighton included the A1 "Terrier" class, awarded a gold medal at the 1870 Paris Exhibition, the B1 "Gladstone" class 0-4-2 (awarded a gold medal at the 1889 Paris Exhibition), the D1 0-4-2T, the Billinton B4 4-4-0, and D3 0-4-4T classes, the Marsh H2 class 4-4-2, and L Class 4-6-4T. Locomotive building at Brighton ceased at the end of 1916 with the building of the last E2 0-6-0 tank, and five K class 2-6-0, and did not resume until late 1920, with further members of the K and L classes. The last locomotive to be built at the works by the LB&SCR was L class No. 333 Remembrance.

=== Southern Railway ===
For the first three years of Southern Railway ownership, no new locomotives were built at Brighton, although rebuilding of the B4 class into virtually new locomotives took place. During 1926 the works was responsible for building ten examples of Maunsell's "River class" and then rebuilding of six of them into "U class" 2-6-0 tender locomotives two years later. The works also built a further ten "U" class in 1928. The following year the works constructed all of the designer's Z class 0-8-0T locomotives, before locomotive construction again ceased.

During the war years Brighton works built more than half of Bulleid's Q1 class 0-6-0 freight locomotives, and the drawing office was primarily responsible for the detailed designs of his revolutionary Merchant Navy 4-6-2 express passenger locomotives, although the locomotives were built at Eastleigh Works. From 1943 they built 93 of the LMS Stanier 8F type 2-8-0 freight locomotives for the War Department, at the incredible rate of one every 4.5 days.

The heyday of locomotive building at the works was during the decade after the war, when Brighton built more than 100 Bulleid light pacifics of the West Country and Battle of Britain classes. The works also constructed the boilers and tenders for the final batch of ten Merchant Navy class, although the locomotives were constructed at Eastleigh. The thousandth locomotive to be constructed at the works was 21C164 "Fighter Command" in June 1947. This figure did not take into account 12 B4X class 4-4-0 from 1922 to 1924 which were officially classified as rebuilds rather than new locomotives.

=== British Railways ===
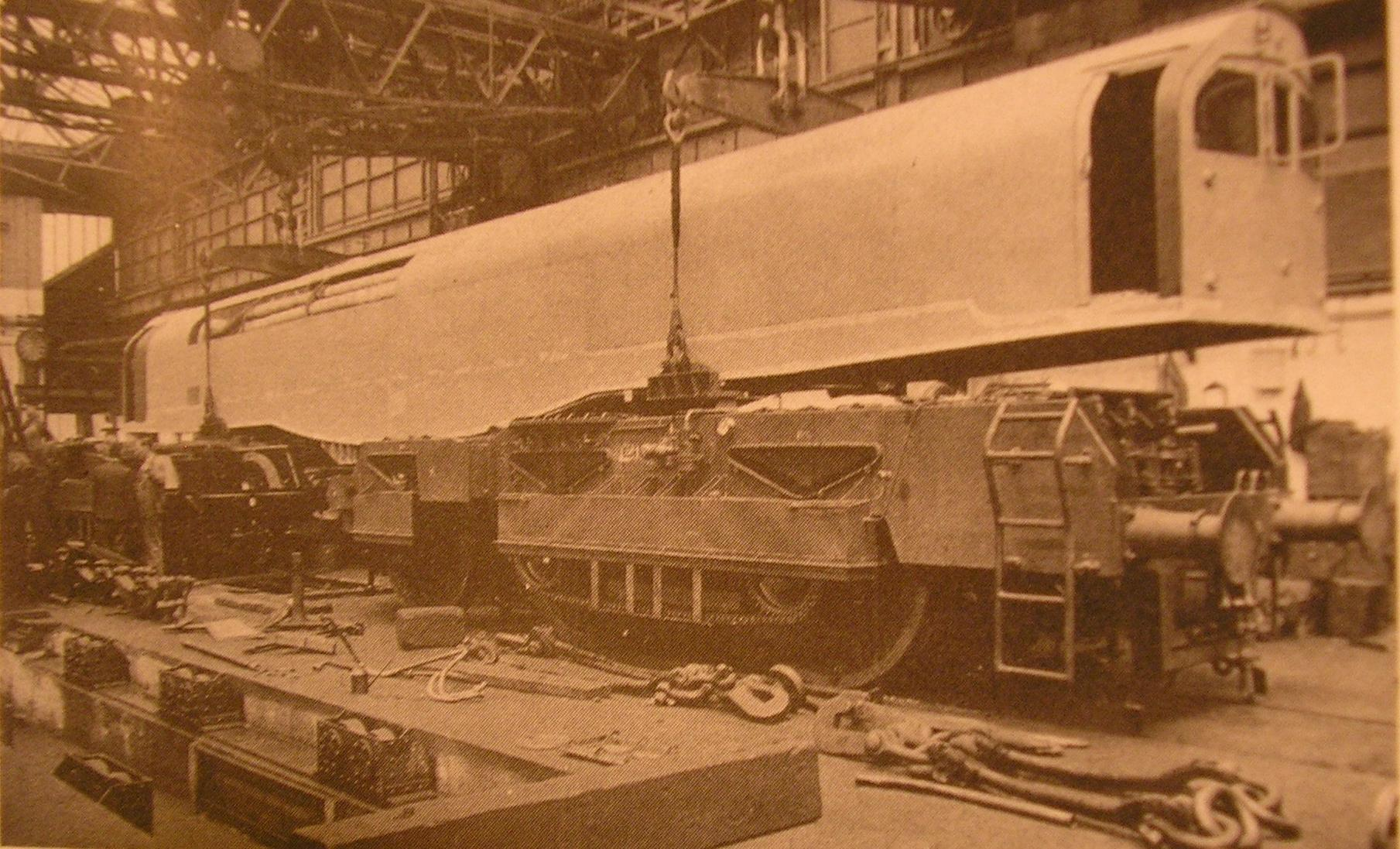
The Leader being lifted onto its power bogies at Brighton, May 1949.

During the early years of British Railways Brighton works constructed two further batches of "West Country" pacifics and would have been responsible for the entire class of 110 locomotives, had not the works become overstretched due to its involvement in the design and construction of Bulleid's problematic and ultimately ill-fated Leader class in 1949. Thereafter it was responsible for building 41 examples of the LMS Fairburn 2-6-4T for use on the Southern Region.

In addition to the Leader class, other prototype locomotives constructed at Brighton included the third 3rd rail Co-Co electric locomotive, numbered 20003 in 1948, and the third 1Co-Co1 diesel electric locomotive numbered 10203 in 1954.

Brighton staff were involved in the design of three of the most successful BR standard classes – the class 4 4-6-0 tender, and class 4 2-6-4 tank classes together with the 9F 2-10-0 class – and the works built 130 examples of the class 4 tank locomotives after 1951. In 1955 R.G. Jarvis, Chief Technical Assistant at the works, and his staff were responsible for the design of the highly successful rebuilds of the "Merchant Navy" and "West Country" classes, although the rebuilding took place at Eastleigh.

New locomotive construction ceased in 1957 with the construction of BR standard class 4 tank 80154, which was the 1,211th locomotive to be constructed there.

== Other engineering work undertaken at Brighton works ==
As mentioned above, the works undertook marine engineering for the railway until the mid-1870s and carriage construction until the opening of Lancing Carriage Works. In addition it constructed turntables and other heavy equipment for the railway.
