= LB&SCR H1 class =

Class of 4-4-2 steam locomotives

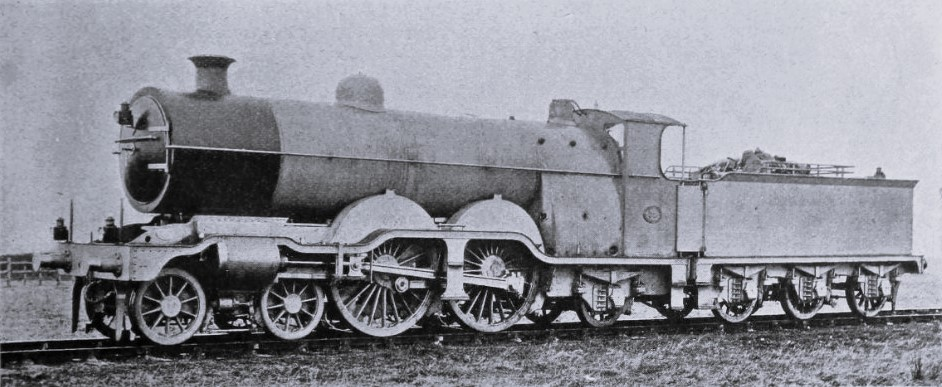
- Official photograph of No.37 shortly after delivery in 1905.
Type and origin
- Power type: Steam
- Designer: D. E. Marsh
- Builder: Kitson & Co.
- Build date: 1905–1906
- Total produced: 5
Specifications
- Configuration
  - Whyte: 4-4-2
- Gauge: 4 ft 8 1/2 in (1,435 mm) standard gauge
- Leading dia.: 3 ft 6 in (1.067 m)
- Driver dia.: 6 ft 7 1/2 in (2.019 m)
- Total weight: 106 long tons 5 cwt (238,000 lb or 108 t) (119 short tons)
- Fuel type: Coal
- Boiler pressure: 200 psi (13.79 bar; 1.38 MPa)
- Cylinders: Two, outside
- Cylinder size: 18.5 in × 26 in (470 mm × 660 mm)
Performance figures
- Tractive effort: 19,028 lbf (84.6 kN)
Career
- Operators: London, Brighton and South Coast Railway; Southern Railway; British Railways
- Class: H1
- Power class: BR: 3P
- Withdrawn: 1944–1951
- Disposition: All scrapped

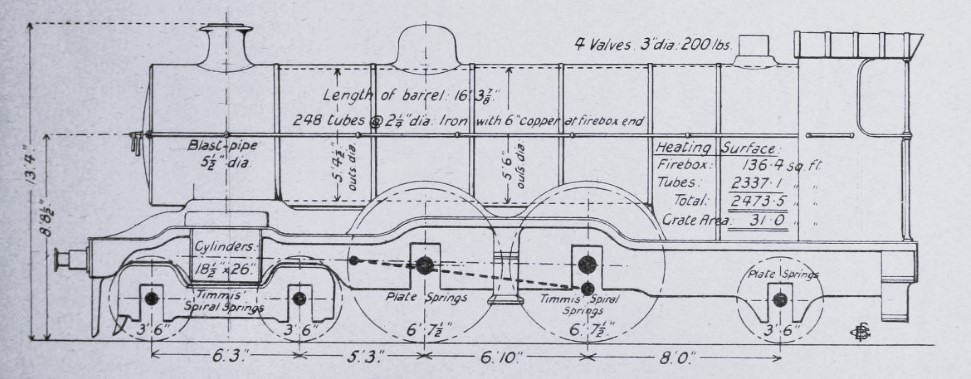
Diagram showing leading dimensions

The London, Brighton and South Coast Railway (LB&SCR) H1 class was a class of 4-4-2 steam locomotives for express passenger work. They were designed by D. E. Marsh and were built by Messrs Kitson and Company in 1905 and 1906.

== History ==
Prior to taking up office as the Locomotive Superintendent of the LB&SCR in 1905, Marsh had worked for the Great Northern Railway at Doncaster Works. There he had been involved in the design of the Klondyke class designed by Henry Ivatt in 1897. There was an urgent need for new large express passenger locomotives for the LB&SCR, and so he obtained a set of drawings of the large-boilered GNR Atlantics of the C1 class from Doncaster, and made only detailed amendments before ordering five of them from the manufacturer. He did however increase the boiler pressure from 175 to 200 pounds per square inch (1.21 to 1.38 MPa) and altered the cylinder dimensions.

== Performance ==
The class soon proved to be successful working the London to Brighton express trains including the heavily loaded Pullman services the "Brighton Limited", and The Southern Belle, which the LB&SCR described as "the most luxurious train in the World".

== Superheating ==
In May 1920, L. B. Billinton wished to install the Schmidt superheater to improve the efficiency of the class, but was refused permission to do so by the Brighton Locomotive Committee. This modification was however carried out by Richard Maunsell of the Southern Railway during 1925–1926 after the Grouping of 1923.

== Re-allocation ==
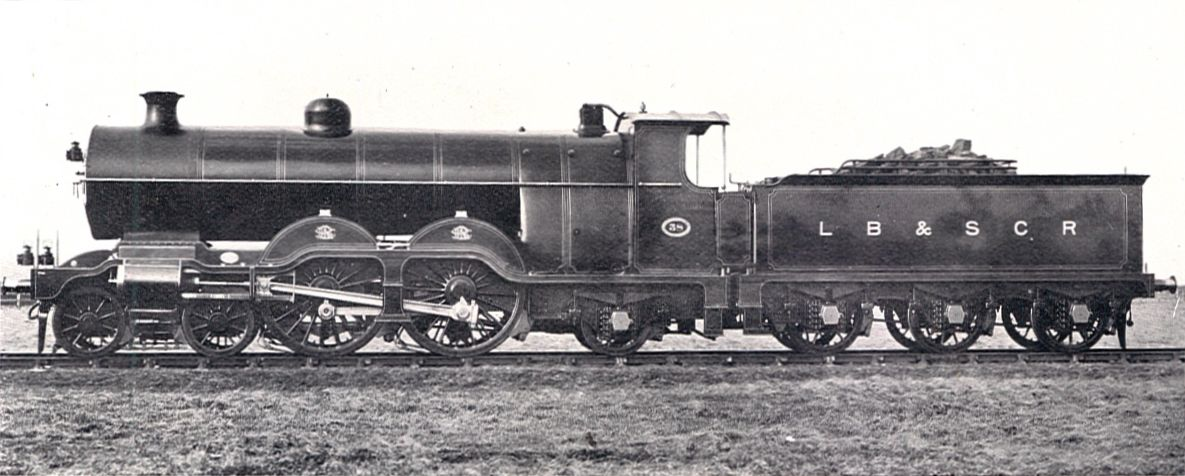
No. 38 as running in 1907

During 1925 and 1926 the H1 class were gradually replaced on the London-Brighton express trains by the "King Arthur" and "River" classes, but there was still plenty of work for them on other express services, including the boat trains connecting with the Newhaven-Dieppe ferry service.

== Withdrawal ==
Following the cessation of the cross-channel ferries after 1940, as a result of the Second World War the class were left with little work to do and several were put into store or else moved to miscellaneous duties in southern England, and the first members of the class were withdrawn in 1944.

In July 1947, No. 2039 was experimentally rebuilt with sleeve valves by Oliver Bulleid as a mobile test bed in preparation for his Leader class locomotives. It was never returned to its original state and in common with the remainder of the class had been withdrawn by 1951. All members of the class were scrapped.

== Locomotive summary ==
H1 class fleet summary
LB&SC Number	Built	S.R. Number	Name	B.R. Number	Withdrawal
37	December 1905	2037	Selsey Bill (from March 1926)	32037	July 1951
38	December 1905	2038	Portland Bill (from May 1925)	32038	July 1951
39	January 1906	2039	La France (June 1913–January 1926); Hartland Point (from January 1926)	32039	February 1951
40	February 1906	2040	St Catherine's Point (from July 1925)	—	January 1944
41	February 1906	2041	Peveril Point (from March 1925)	—	March 1944

No. 39 was named La France in connection with the visit to Portsmouth of Raymond Poincaré, the President of France; the locomotive was often used for royal trains and other important special trains, and had been selected to haul the train conveying Poincaré. The whole class was named (and no. 39 renamed) during 1925–26 because the Southern Railway's publicity department had decided that express passenger locomotives should be named in order to improve the railway's image. For this class, the names selected were of coastal landmarks in southern England.
