= Wilhelm Schmidt (engineer) =

German engineer and inventor

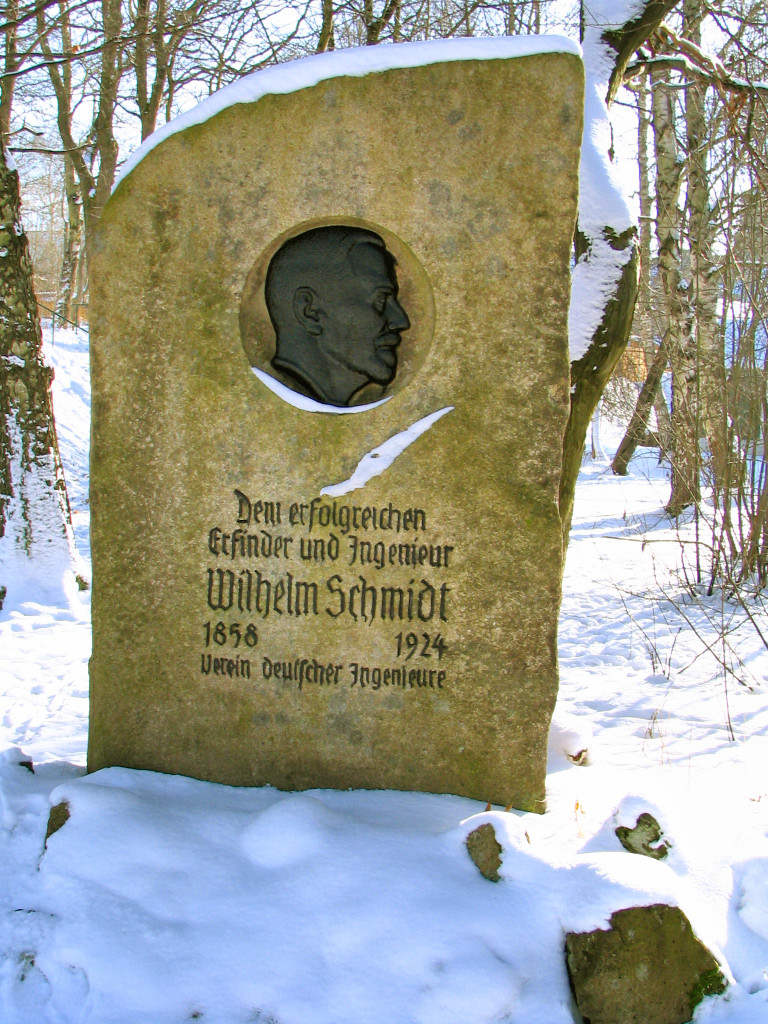
Monument to Hot Steam Schmidt in Benneckenstein

Wilhelm Schmidt, known as Hot Steam Schmidt (German: Heißdampf-Schmidt) (1858–1924) was a German engineer and inventor who achieved the breakthrough in the development of superheated steam technology for steam engines. Wilhelm Schmidt was born in Wegeleben in the Prussian Province of Saxony on 18 February 1858.

== Education ==
At school Wilhelm Schmidt had difficulties with reading, writing and arithmetic, a case of dyslexia. For example, he was unable to recite the alphabet without hesitation all his life. Nor could he memorise poetry or prose. He developed a passion for drawing, however, and for machines.

== Career ==
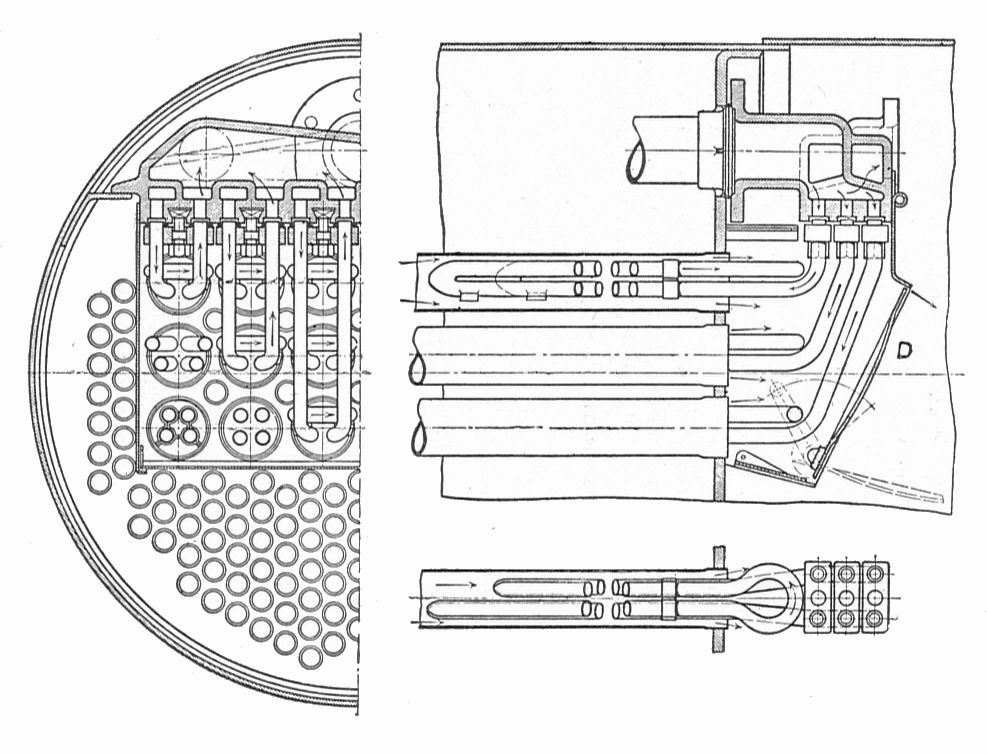
Diagram of Schmidt superheater

Schmidt began his professional career as a machine fitter. He studied at the technical high school in Dresden under Gustav Zeuner.

=== Superheated steam ===
In 1883 he took a post as a civil engineer in Kassel, where he developed superheated steam technology to the point where it could be practically used. In 1908 he transferred his home and the base of his firm to Benneckenstein in the Harz. He was not the first person to work with superheated steam, but his predecessors had only used steam temperatures up to 250 °C (482 °F; 523 K); Schmidt was the first to risk increasing this to 350 °C (662 °F; 623 K).

=== Schmidt Superheated Steam Company ===
For further trials with superheated steam on the Ilsenburg – Wernigerode railway, there was a trials organisation near Wernigerode station. It was here that Schmidt founded the Schmidt Superheated Steam Company (Schmidtsche Heissdampfgesellschaft).

By using superheated steam the thermal efficiency of a steam engine could be raised by as much as 50%. This technology had a substantial influence on the development of the steam locomotive and steamship, as well as all other applications where steam engines were used. Schmidt also invented other items, such as the superheater (around 1890) and the piston valve, which he developed together with Robert Garbe of the Prussian state railways.

=== ALSTOM Power Energy Recovery ===
Even today, his successor company - Schmidt'schen Heissdampf GmbH, survives under the name of ALSTOM Power Energy Recovery GmbH, in Kassel-Bettenhausen. It develops and builds apparatus for the processes involving the transfer of heat in the petrochemical, chemical and metallurgical industries, e.g. cracked gas coolers for the manufacture of ethylene, gas coolers for the manufacture of methanol, ammonia and hydrogen and a multitude of equipment for special purposes. The company continues to be highly innovative and a market leader in its field.

== Religious views ==
Schmidt viewed his inventions however as rather unimportant in view of "a world which is badly lost". He held a strong faith and distributed Warning Cry to the People (Mahnrufe an das Volk) from Bethel, near Bielefeld. He was friends with Friedrich von Bodelschwingh. He held the view that Anglo-Saxon Christianity had weakened German Christianity. He died on 16 February 1924 in Bethel.
