= Arnold Jung Lokomotivfabrik =

German locomotive manufacturer

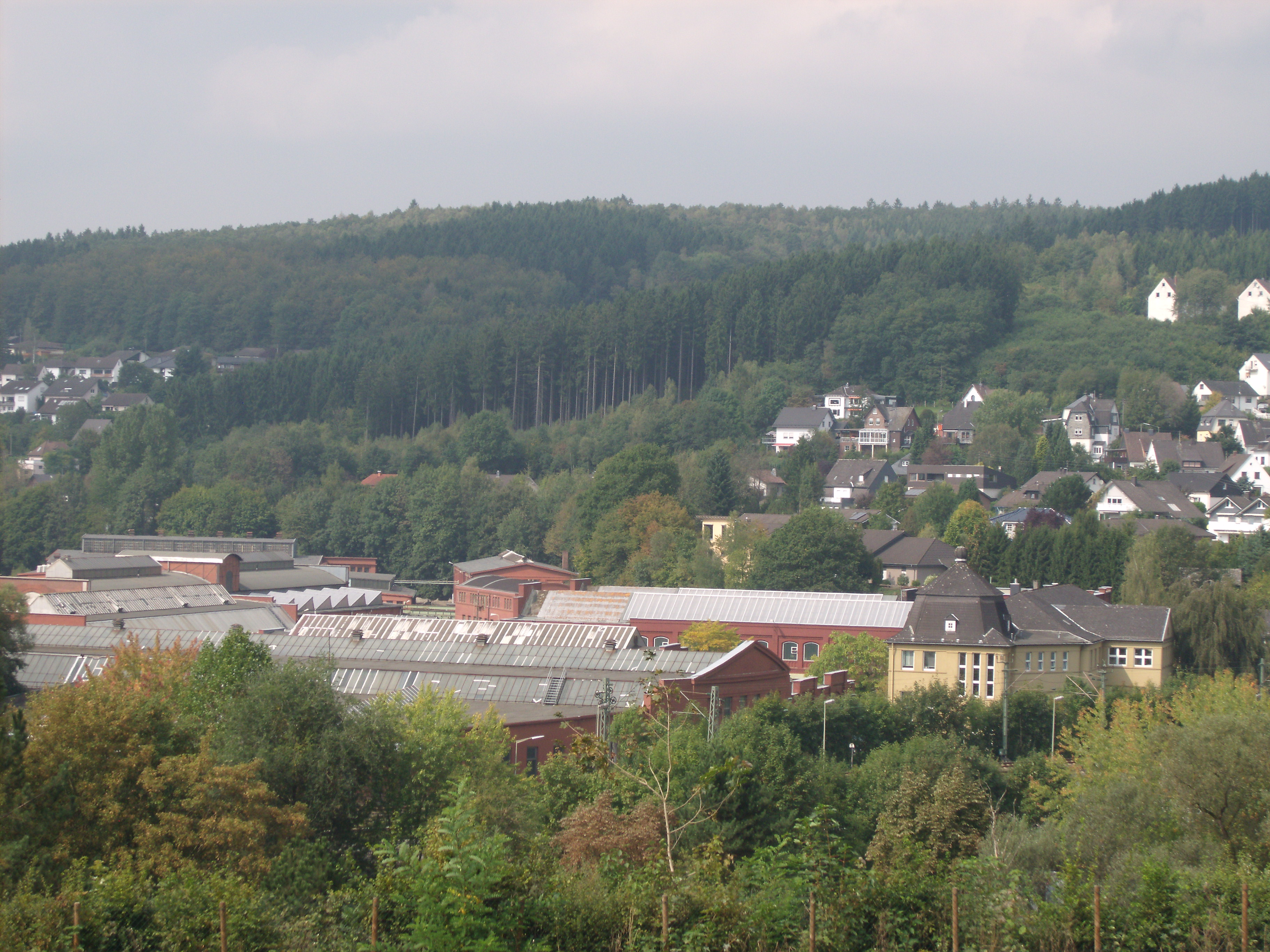
Overview of the remaining factory premises

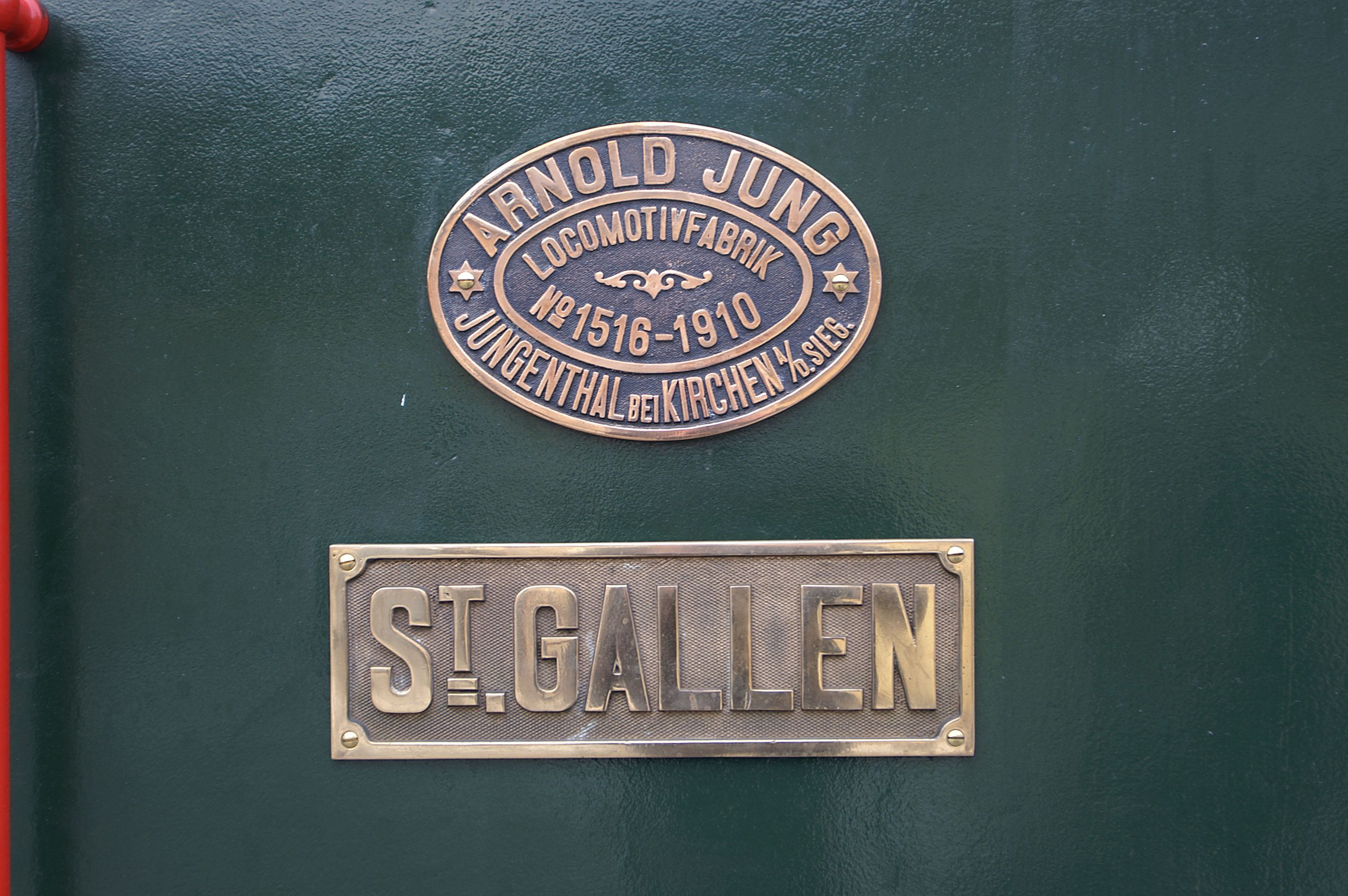
Factory plate on a steam locomotive

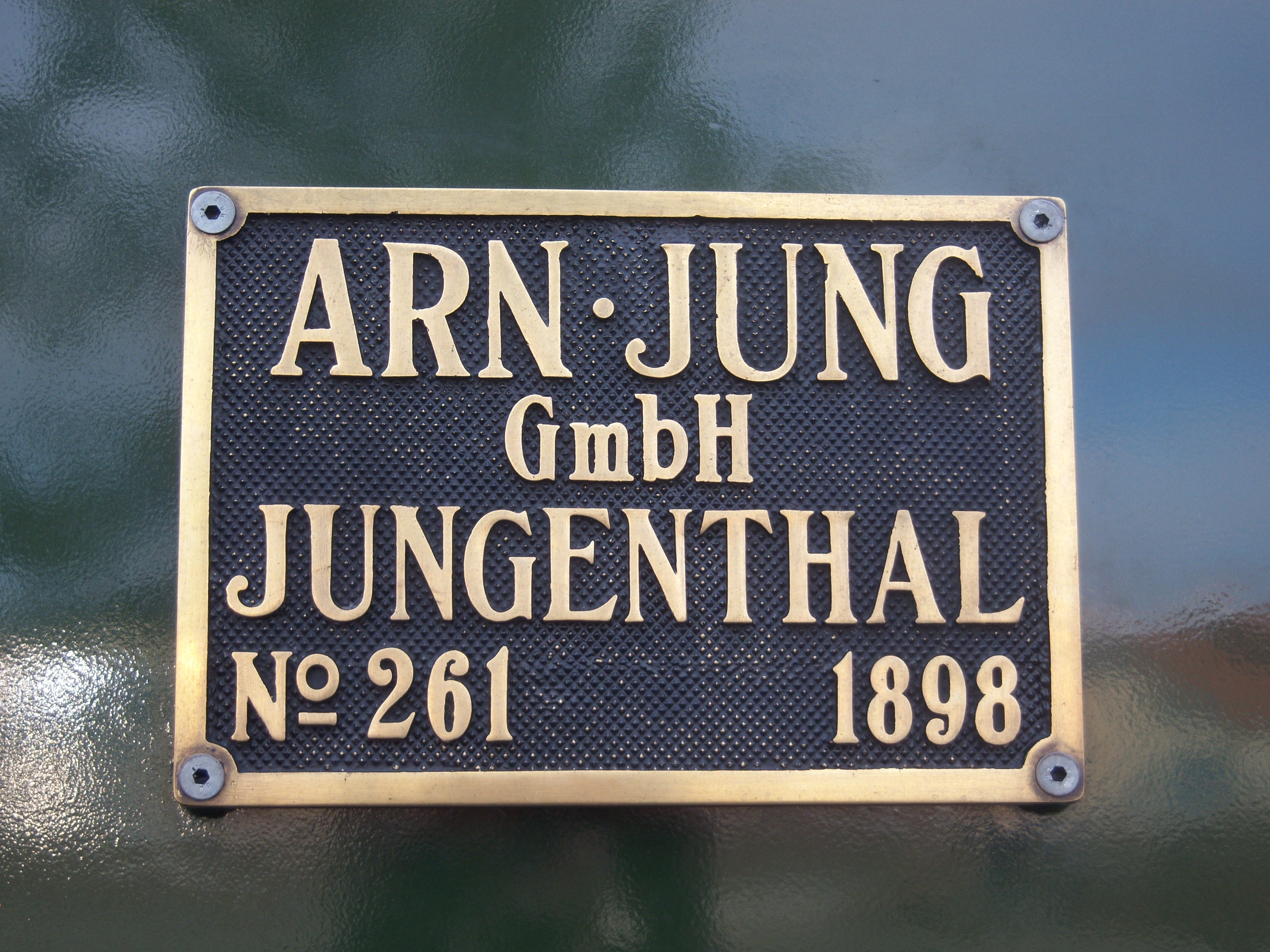
Factory plate on Mallet locomotive 99 5902 of the HSB

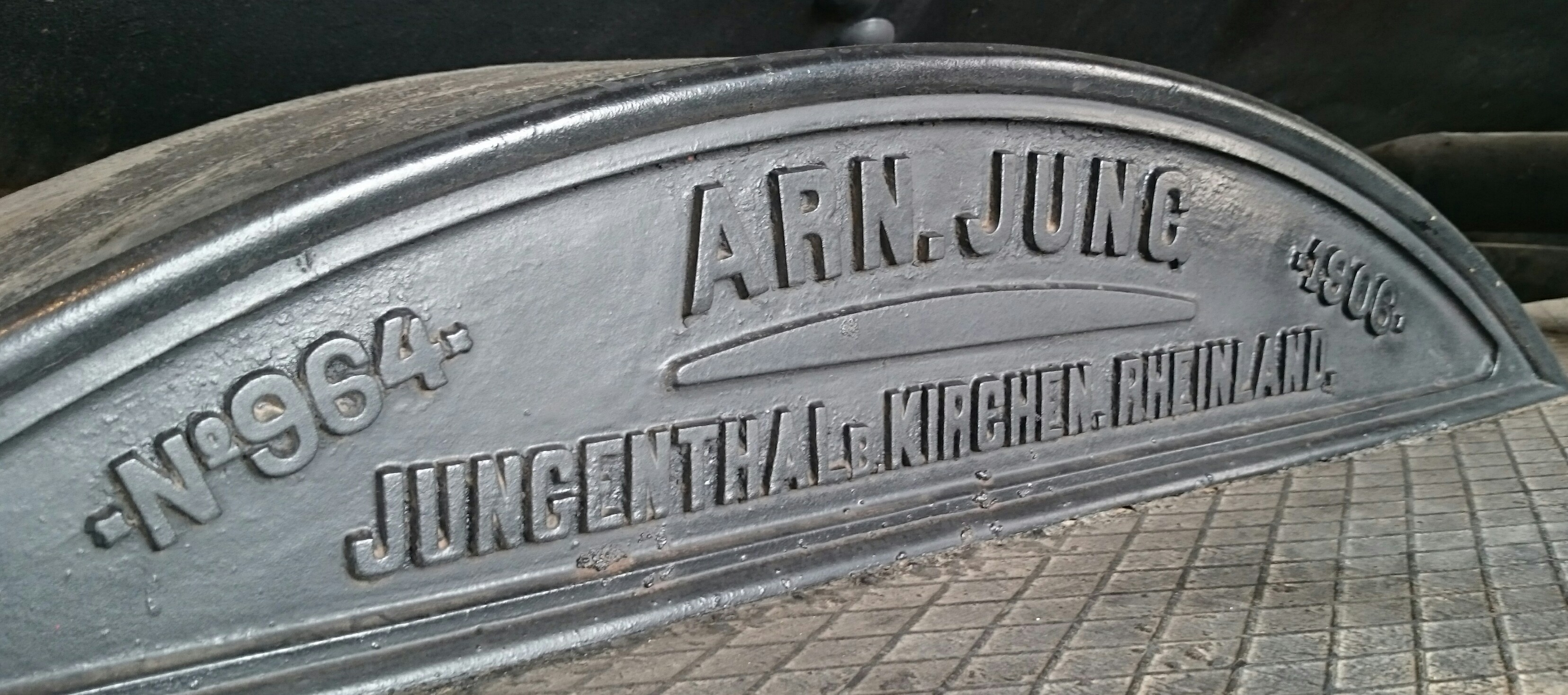
Factory plate of engine no. 964 for the Hejaz Railway in Mada'in Saleh

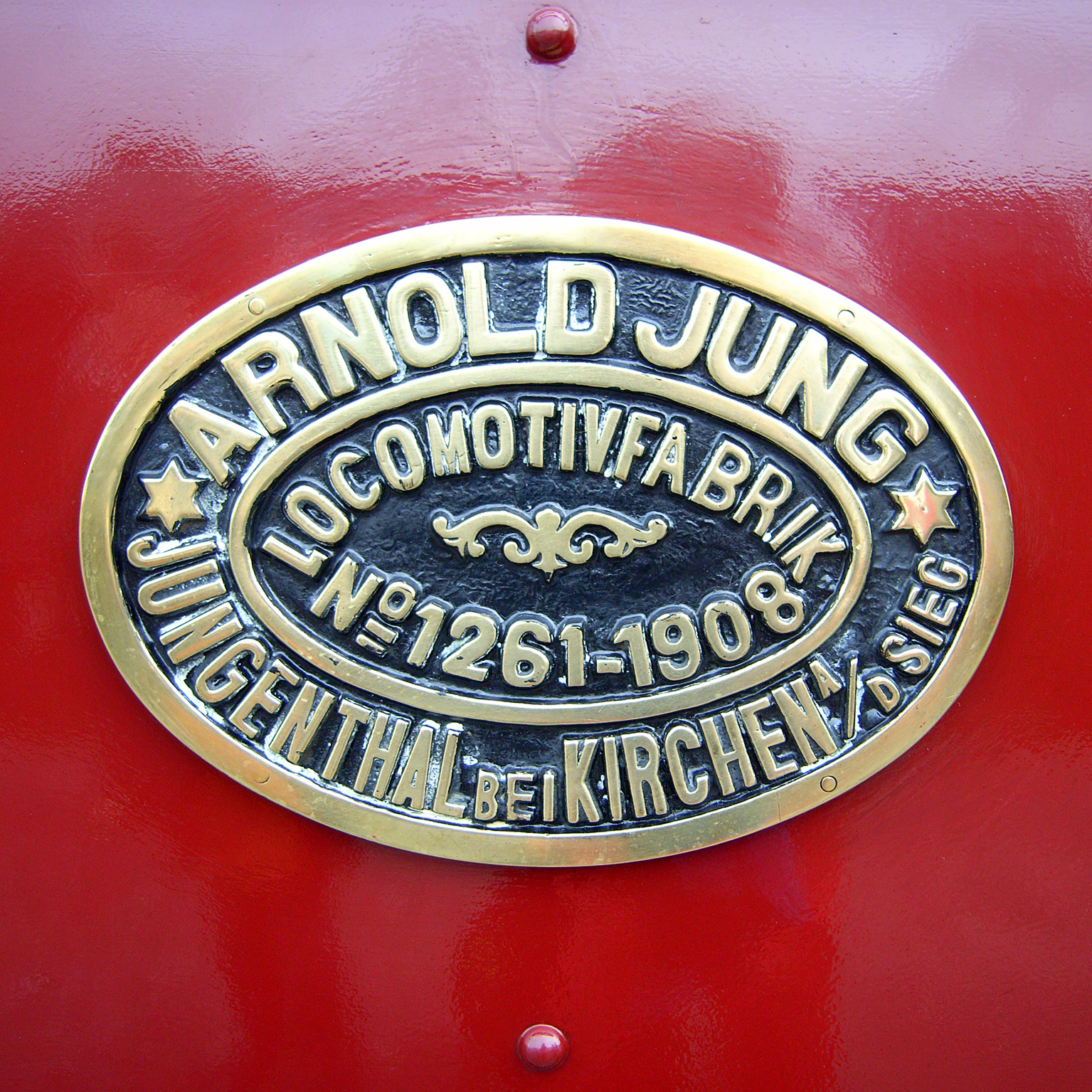
Factory plate 'Arnold Jung Locomotivfabrik' from 'Graf Schwerin-Löwitz' No. 1261

The Arnold Jung Lokomotivfabrik (Arnold Jung Locomotive Works) was a locomotive manufacturer, in particular of Feldbahn locomotives, in Kirchen, Rheinland-Pfalz, Germany.

== History ==
The firm was founded on 13 February 1885 as Jung & Staimer OHG by Arnold Jung and Christian Staimer. On 3 September 1885 the first locomotive was delivered. In 1913 the company was renamed Arnold Jung Lokomotivfabrik GmbH, Jungenthal. In 1976 locomotive production was stopped in favour of other products such as machine tools, transporters, armour plating, cranes and bridgelayers.

Jung built more than 12,000 locomotives. In the 1950s it built 51 DB Class 23 2-6-2 locomotives, including in 1959, number 23 105, the last new steam locomotive supplied to the Deutsche Bundesbahn. Jung also made boilers for other uses such as steam rollers.

By the 1950s Jung was also building diesel locomotives, such as the 42 standard gauge Egyptian Republic Railways 4211 class shunters in 1953–56.

Production ceased on 30 September 1993 and the factory closed, but the firm continues to exist as Jungenthal Systemtechnik GmbH.

== Preserved locomotives ==
There are 281 Arnold Jung steam locomotives still extant, according to the list at Steam Locomotive website.

Built	Works number	Wheel arrangement	Origin	Id	Current location	Notes	Photograph
1892	129	0-4-0T	Reykjavík Harbour Railway		Árbær Museum	Pionér is in a shed at the museum – rebuilt 1910 and given a new no.: 1591	
1892	130	0-4-0T	Reykjavík Harbour Railway		Reykjavík Harbour	Minør is on a very small section of track in Reykjavík Harbour	
1903	707–716, 804–808	0-6-2T	Otavi Mining and Railway Company	1–15	Tsumeb, Namibia	South West African Jung, Plinthed	
1906	939	0-4-0WT	A gravel washery at Maeseyck	Justine	Toddington Narrow Gauge Railway	In 1974, purchased by a group of enthusiasts, from a Belgian dealer. Briefly returned to Belgium in 1995 to work on a preserved railway. In 2008 worked all the "Santa Specials" on the Lynton and Barnstaple Railway.	
1906	964	2-6-0T	Hejaz Railway	964	Mada'in Saleh, Saudi Arabia	In a railroad museum workshop at the entrance of the Mada'in Saleh World Heritage Site.	
1908	1261	0-6-2WT	Mecklenburgisch-Vorpommersche Schmalspurbahn (MPSB) Nr. 5 / Deutsche Reichsbahn (DR) Nr. 99 3353	Graf Schwerin-Löwitz	Vale of Rheidol Railway	Previously worked at the Brecon Mountain Railway, near Merthyr Tydfil but since the line has extended to Torpantau it is not powerful enough to operate trains. Currently on static display at Vale of Rheidol Railway	
1913	2008				Fiabilandia (Rimini)	Used as a children's attraction, near the park station.	
1917	2279	0-4-4-0T	Ceper Baru Sugar Mill, Java	Tjepper No. 5	Statfold Barn Railway		
1925	3698	0-4-0T	The Basalt quarry near the village Kausen.	RLJ 2 "A. Dahl"	Risten-Lakvik Railway museum	Came to Sweden in 1971 where it would end up in the hands of Risten-Lakvik Railway Museum in 1975 where it has run tourist trains during the summer since 1979. In 2017 it received a major renovation at Statfold Engineering, which finished in 2020 and is back in service since 2021	
1926	3534	0-8-2T (D1'h2-t)	SHS RU 8	JDŽ 83-052	Šarganska osmica		
1931	3872	0-6-0WT	Used in sugar plantations in the Cameroons.	No 2, KATIE	Bredgar and Wormshill Light Railway		
1937	7509	0-4-0T		Ginette Marie	In storage at Strumpshaw Hall Steam Museum	Based on the Llanberis Lake Railway from December 1971 to February 1980.	
1939	8692			41 303; 41 1303-1; Hei Na Ganzlin	Röbel/Müritz	Rekolok, only parts of the locomotive remain	
1940	9318			41 360; 042 360-8	Dampflok-Tradition Oberhausen	Oil-fired	
1941	9322			41 364; 042 364-0	Augsburg Railway Park, Augsburg	Oil-fired, new-type boiler '61, Museum locomotive	
1942	9933	0-4-0T			Merrimac (town), Wisconsin	Derelict	
1944	10175	2-8-2T (1'D1')	Rhein-Sieg Eisenbahn (RSE)	53	Bröl Valley Railway		
1952	11474	2-6-2 (1'C1')		23 019; 023 019-3	DDM	Museum locomotive	
1952	11969	2-6-2 (1'C1')		23 029; 023 029-2	Ostalbkreis	Aalen trade school centre, Monument	
1955	12081	2-8-2	Hedjaz Jordan Railway	51	Hedjaz Jordan Railway		
1959	13113	2-6-2 (1'C1')	DB AG	23 105; 023 105-0	South German Railway Museum (SEH)	Last steam engine delivered to the DB; damaged in the major fire on 17 October 2005, on loan for 10 years to SEH for cosmetic restoration	

== Gallery ==
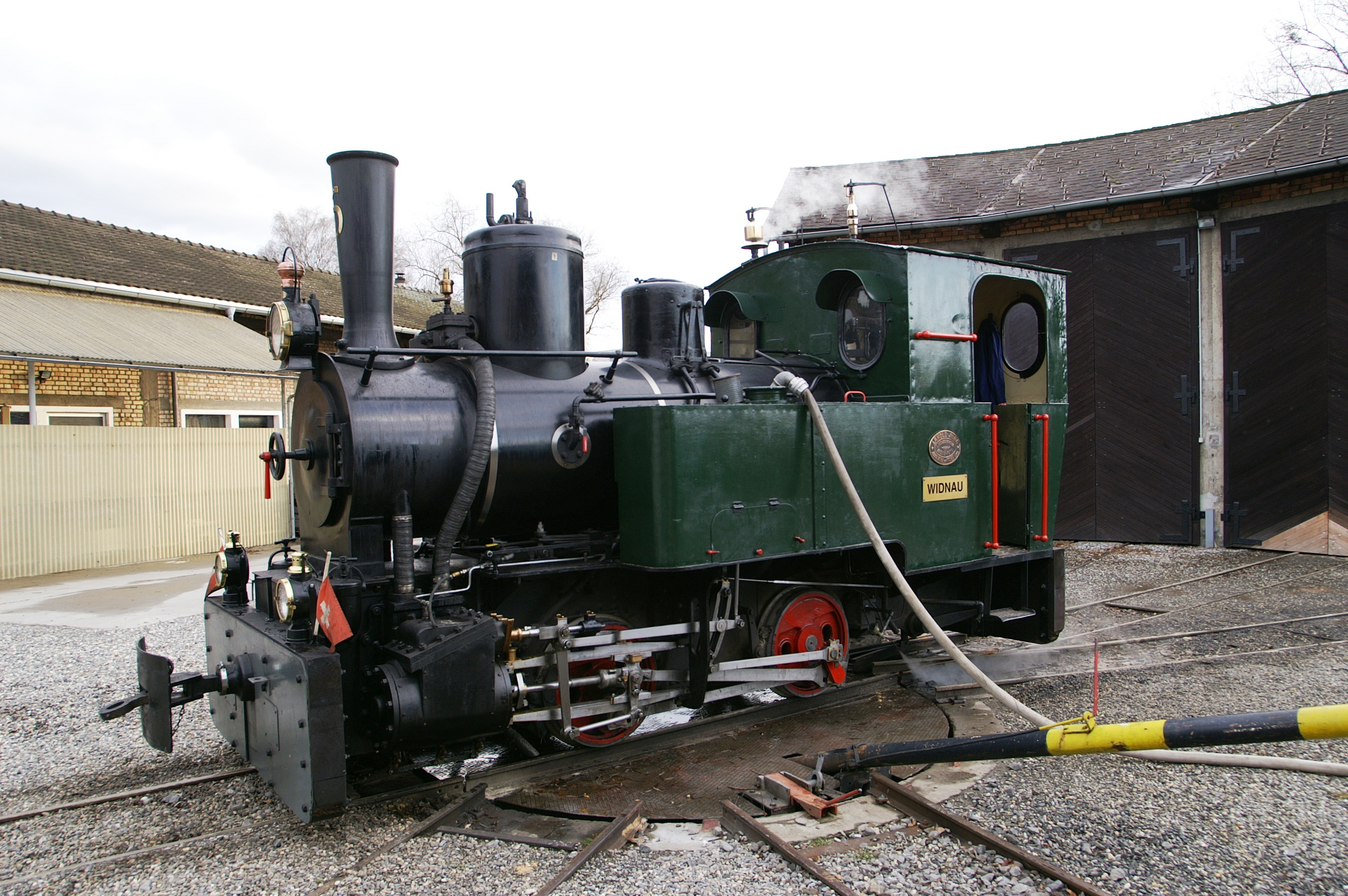
Jung Steam locomotive

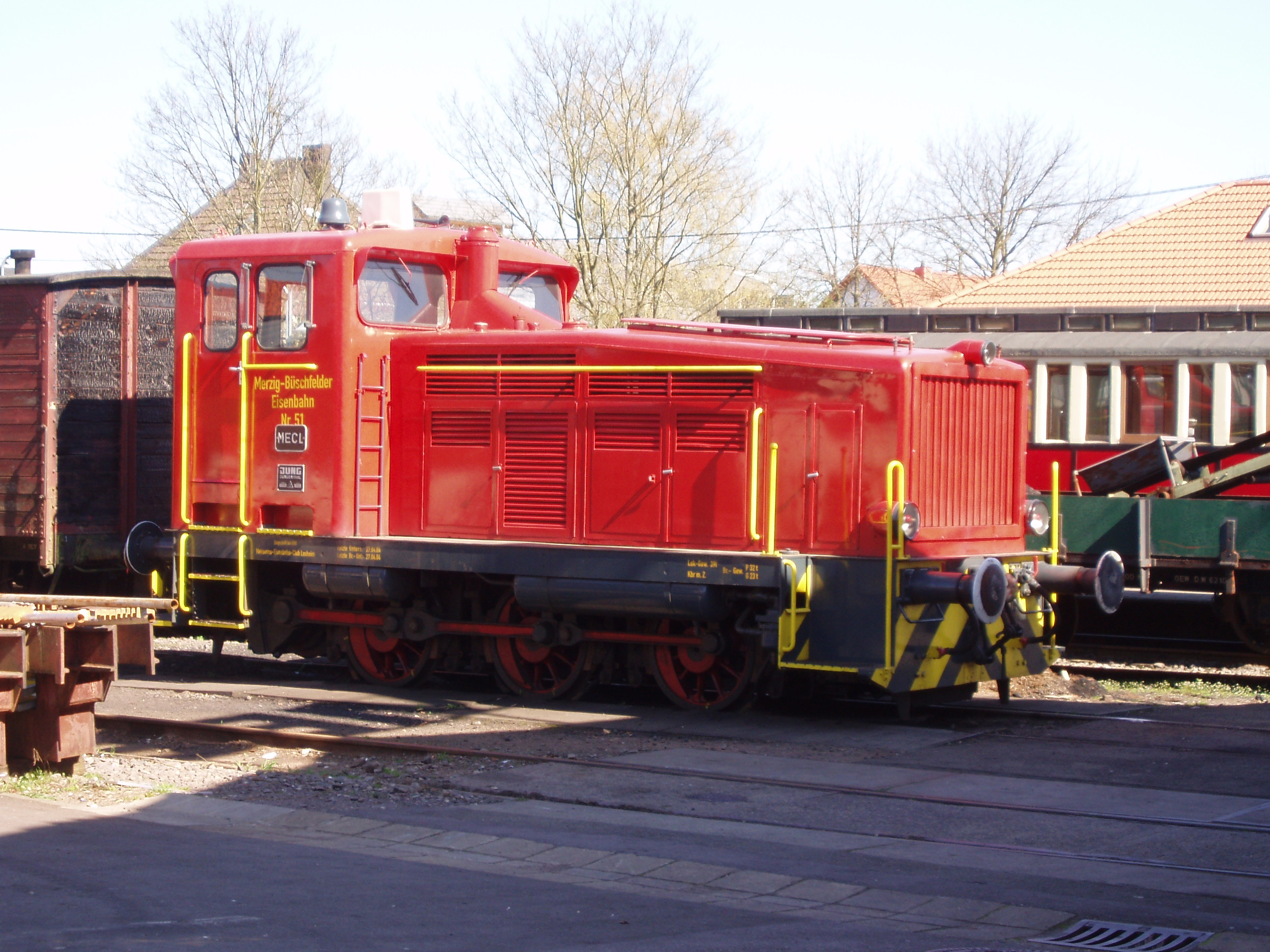
Jung Diesel locomotive

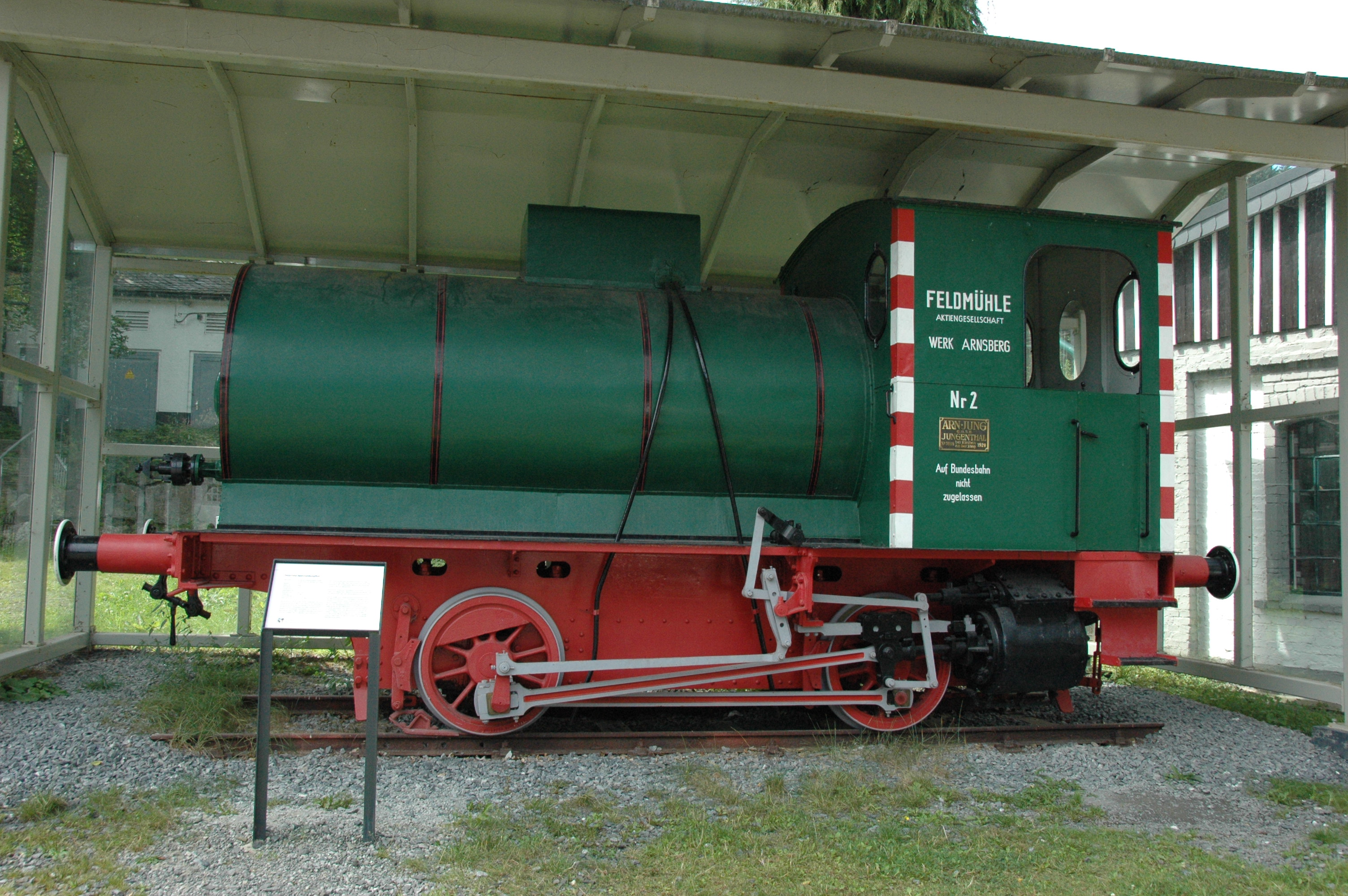
Jung fireless

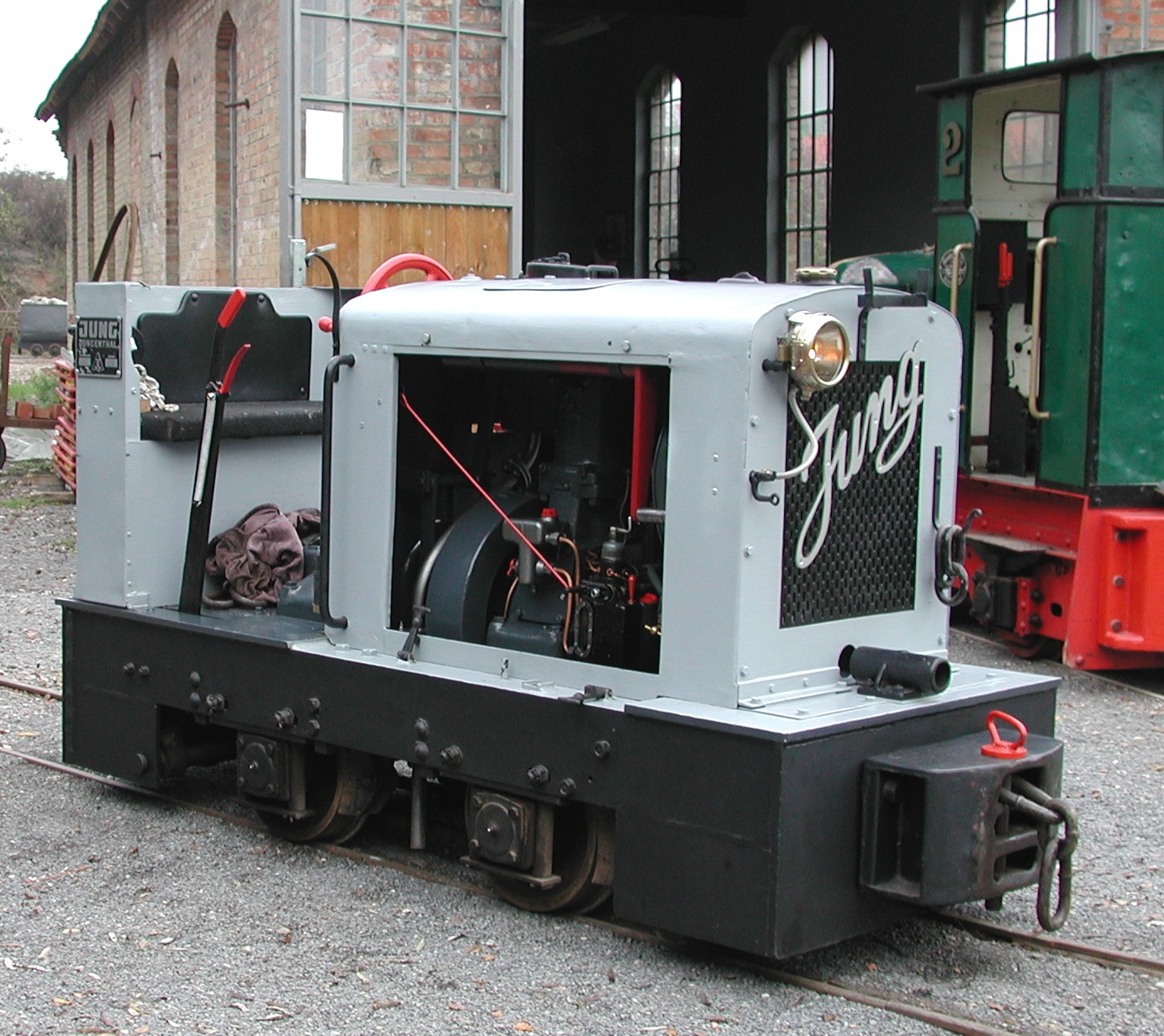
Feldbahn locomotive built by the Arnold Jung Lokomotivfabrik

There is a 5025 steam machine in the "Museo Ferroviario de Santiago de Chile". This machine served in the railway that existed between the Chilean southern towns "Los Sauces" and "Capitan Pastene" (35 km). This railway was begun to be built in 1904 and in 1978 was abandoned.
