= South West African Class Hb =

Class of 15 Nammibian 0-6-2 locomotives

GSWA Class Hb 0-6-2T South West African Class Hb 0-6-2T
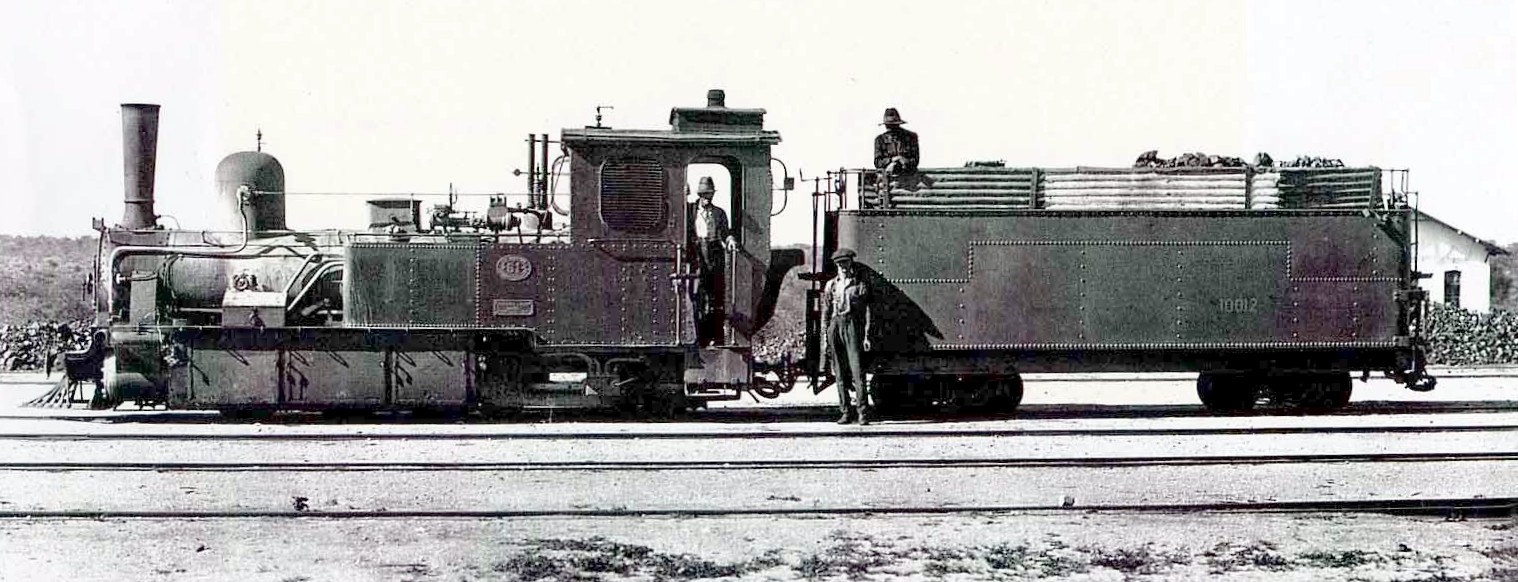
- No. 61 with optional coal and water tender, c. 1930
Type and origin
- Power type: Steam
- Designer: Henschel and Son
- Builder: Henschel and Son
- Serial number: 7298–7300, 7623–7626, 7740–7745, 8610–8611
- Model: Class Hb
- Build date: 1905–1908
- Total produced: 15
Specifications
- Configuration
  - Whyte: 0-6-2T
  - UIC: C1n2t
- Driver: 3rd coupled axle
- Gauge: 600 mm (1 ft 11 5/8 in) narrow
- Coupled dia.: 33 7/8 in (860 mm)
- Wheelbase: 13 ft 3 1/2 in (4,051 mm)
  - Axle spacing (Asymmetrical): 1-2: 3 ft 4 1/2 in (1,029 mm); 2-3: 3 ft 5/8 in (930 mm)
  - Coupled: 6 ft 4 3/4 in (1,949 mm)
- Length
  - Over couplers: 25 ft (7,620 mm)
  - Over beams: 22 ft 6 3/4 in (6,877 mm)
- Width: 7 ft 2 1/2 in (2,197 mm)
- Height: 10 ft 6 in (3,200 mm)
- Adhesive weight: 17 LT 14 cwt (17,980 kg)
- Loco weight: 22 LT 5 cwt (22,610 kg)
- Tender type: 2-axle bogies
- Fuel type: Coal
- Fuel capacity: 15 long hundredweight (0.8 t)
- Water cap.: 220 imp gal (1,000 L)
- Firebox
  - Type: Round-top
  - Grate area: 11.2 sq ft (1.04 m^{2})
- Boiler
  - Pitch: 4 ft 7 1/2 in (1,410 mm)
- Boiler pressure: 171 psi (1,179 kPa)
- Cylinders: Two
- Cylinder size: 320 mm (12.6 in) bore 450 mm (17.7 in) stroke
- Valve gear: Allan
- Couplers: Buffer-and-chains
Performance figures
- Tractive effort: 10,263 lbf (45.65 kN) @ 75%
Career
- Operators: Otavi Mining and Railway Company; South African Railways
- Class: Class Hb
- Number in class: 15
- Numbers: 51–65
- Delivered: 1905–1908
- First run: 1905
- Withdrawn: 1942

The South West African Class Hb 0-6-2T of 1905 was a narrow gauge steam locomotive from the German South West Africa era.

Between 1905 and 1908, the German Administration in German South West Africa acquired fifteen Class Hb 0-6-2T locomotives for lease to the Otavi Mining and Railway Company. Six of these locomotives survived to be taken onto the roster of the South African Railways after the First World War.

== Manufacturer ==
By 1905, the rapid progress with the construction of the Otavi Railway called for heavier and more powerful locomotives. Between 1905 and 1908, fifteen 600 millimetres (23.6 inches) narrow gauge 0-6-2T tank and tank-and-tender steam locomotives were built for the German Administration in German South West Africa (GSWA) by Henschel and Son in Germany. They were designated Class Hb and numbered in the range from 51 to 65.

The locomotives were leased to the Otavi Mining and Railway Company, who operated the narrow gauge Otavi Railway which was being constructed across the Namib Desert between Swakopmund and Tsumeb, to augment their mainline locomotive fleet.

== Characteristics ==
The locomotives used Allan valve gear and were equipped with dust covers to protect the motion from wind-blown sand in the Namib Desert. The "Hb" classification identified the locomotive type as the second class to have been built for GSWA by Henschel. They were delivered in four batches.

- The first three tank locomotives were delivered in 1905, with works numbers in the range from 7298 to 7300 and numbered in the range from 51 to 53.
- Four more followed in 1906, with works numbers in the range from 7623 to 7626 and numbered in the range from 54 to 57.
- Two arrived in 1907, with works numbers 8610 and 8611 and numbered 64 and 65.
- Six were delivered in 1908, with works numbers in the range from 7740 to 7745 and numbered in the range from 58 to 63. These last six locomotives were delivered as tank-and-tender engines, equipped with optional coal and water tenders.

== Service ==
Photographic evidence show that some of these locomotives were eventually permanently converted to tender engines by removing their side tanks.

During the First World War, the former German Colony came under South African administration and the railways in GSWA came under control of the Union Defence Forces. Control of all railway operations in South West Africa (SWA) was passed on from the Military to the Director of Railways in Windhoek on 1 August 1915. On 1 April 1922, all the railway lines and rolling stock in the territory became part of the South African Railways.

Six of these locomotives, numbers 51, 54, 56, 61, 62 and 65, survived into the SAR era. They retained their German Colonial Hb classification and engine numbers while in SAR service. All but one were scrapped after they were withdrawn from service in 1942. Engine no. 56 has been preserved, coupled to a short period train at the Alte Feste museum in Windhoek.

== Illustration ==
In the main picture, engine no. 61 is shown with its side tanks still intact and with an optional coal and water tender.

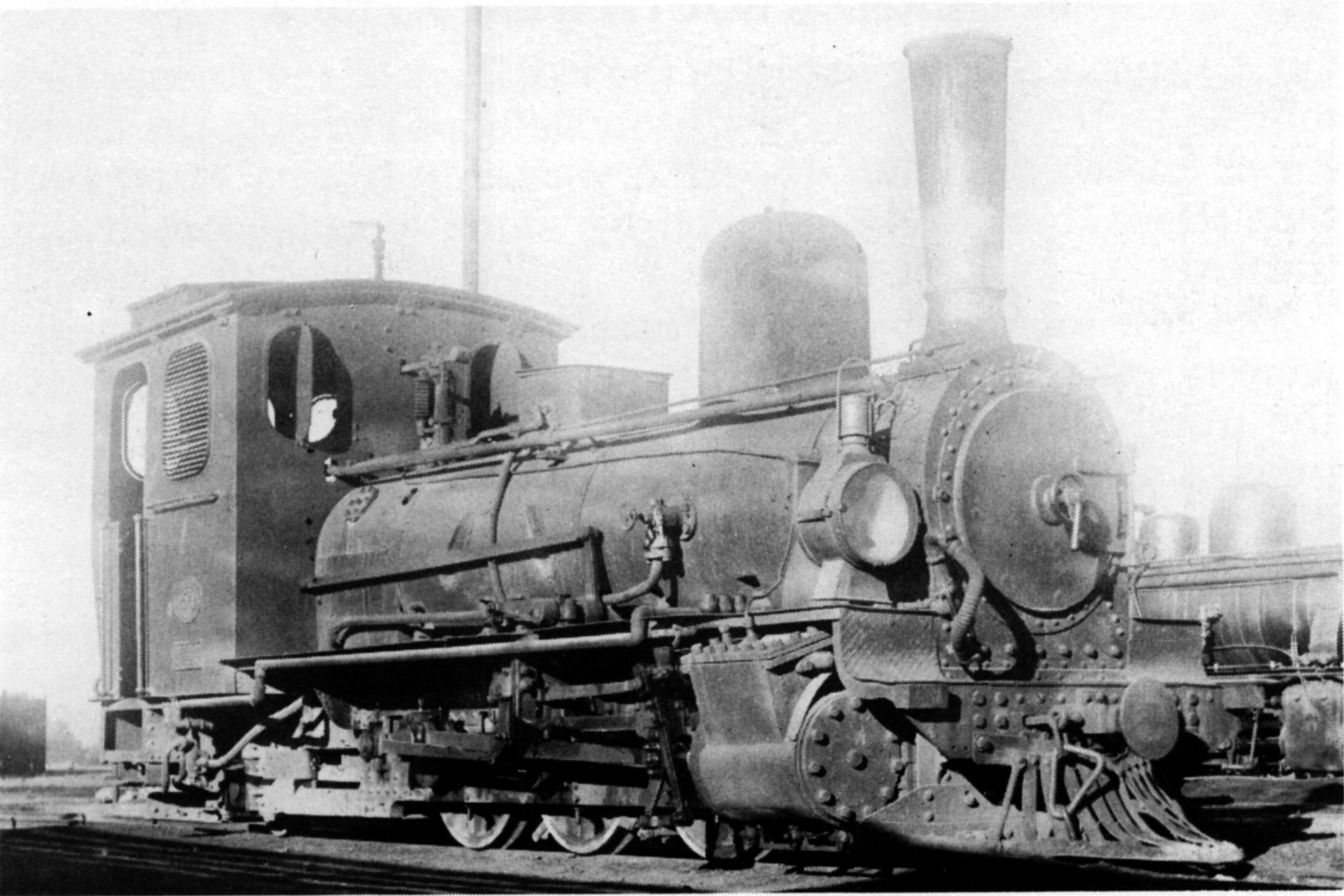
No. 56 without side tanks, c. 1925

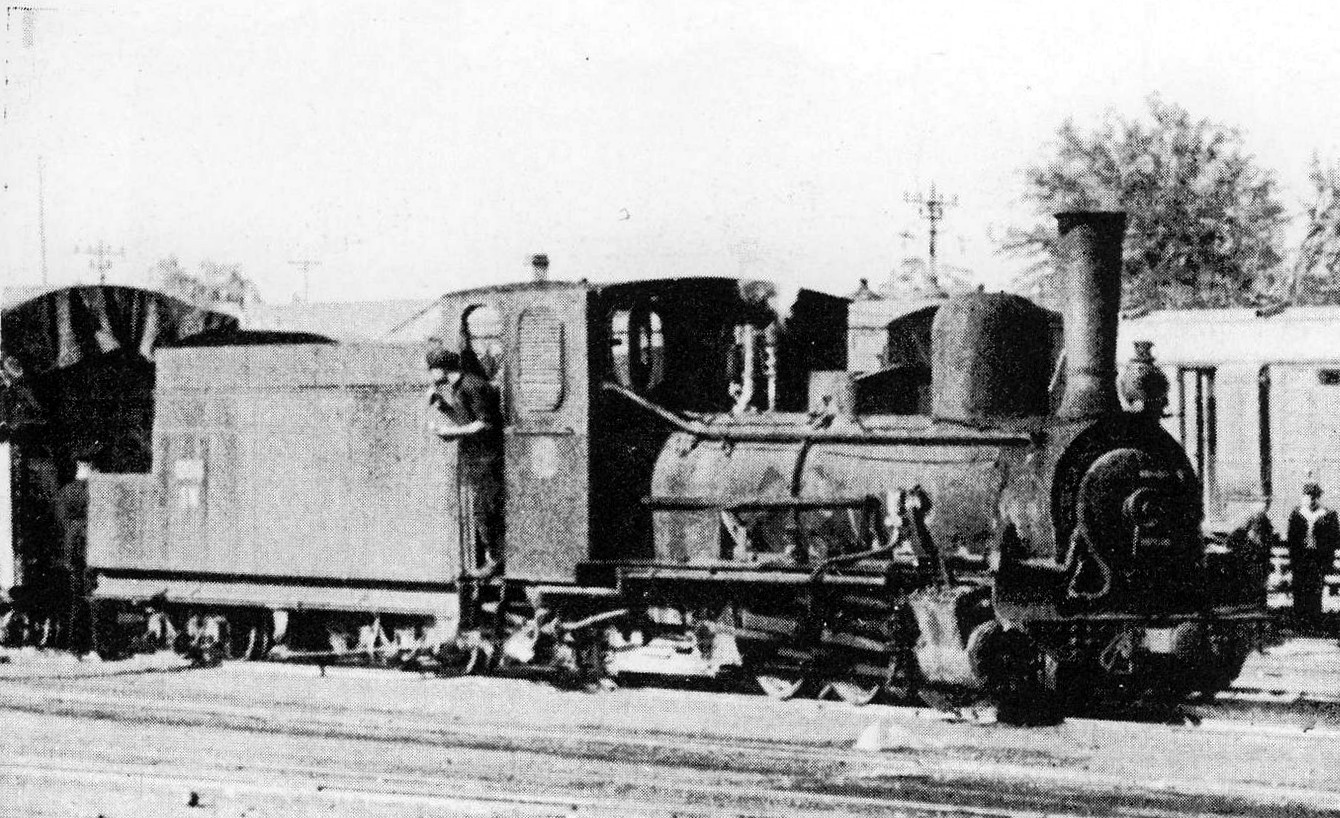
Class Hb without side tanks and with tender, c. 1925
