= GNR Class N1 =

Class of British 0-6-2T steam locomotives

GNR Class N1 LNER Class N1
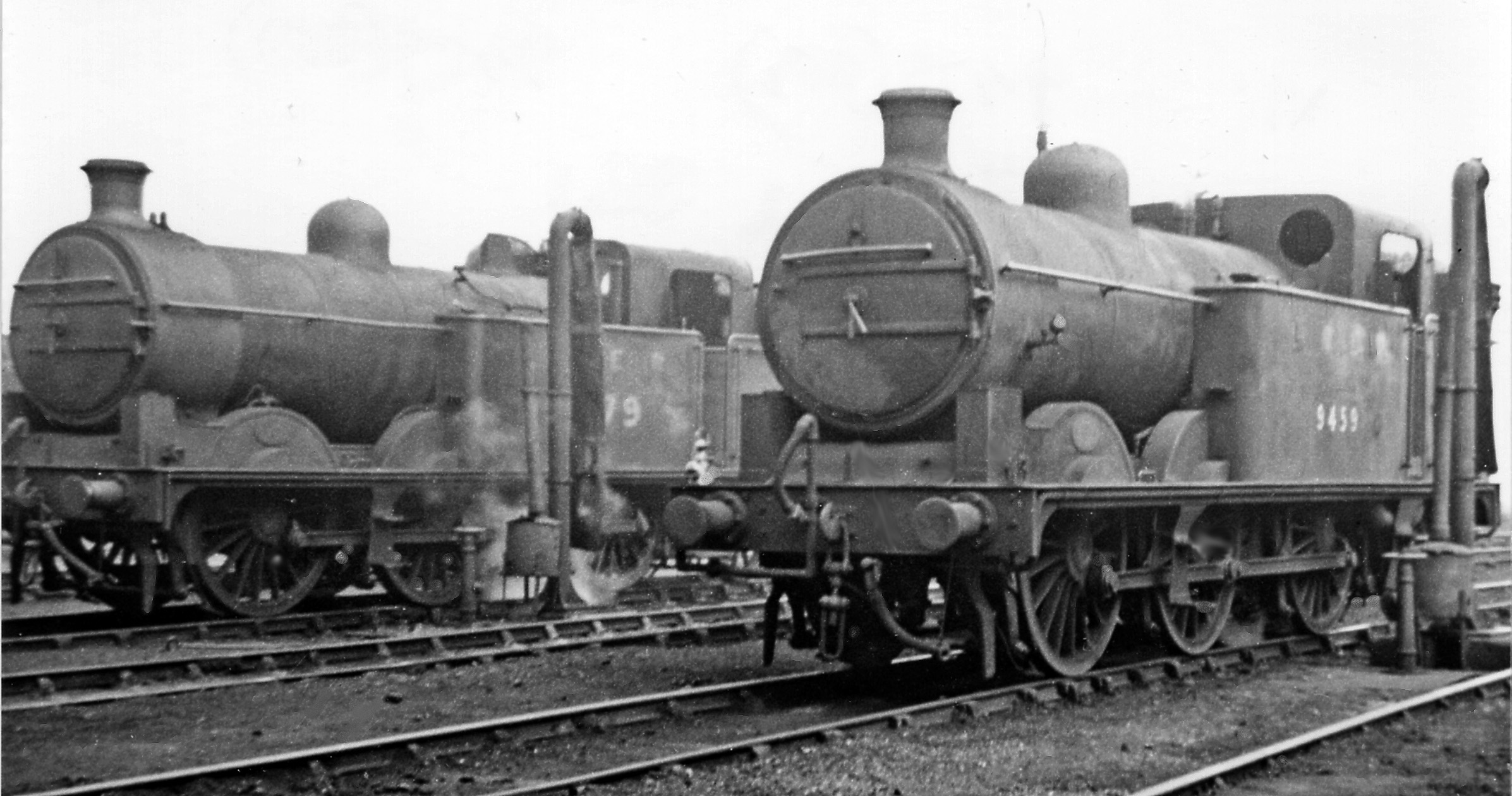
- Nos. 9459 and 9479 at Bradford Hammerton Street Depot in 1947
Type and origin
- Power type: Steam
- Designer: Henry Ivatt
- Builder: Doncaster Works
- Build date: 1906–1912
- Total produced: 56
Specifications
- Configuration
  - Whyte: 0-6-2T
  - UIC: C1 n2t, eleven later C1 h2t
- Gauge: 4 ft 8 1/2 in (1,435 mm)
- Driver dia.: 5 ft 8 in (1.727 m)
- Trailing dia.: 3 ft 8 in (1.118 m)
- Wheelbase: First: 23 ft 3 in (7.09 m); Remainder: 23 ft 9 in (7.24 m)
- Length: First: 35 ft 7 1/2 in (10.86 m); Remainder: 36 ft 7 1/2 in (11.16 m)
- Axle load: 18.00 long tons (18.29 t)
- Adhesive weight: First: 51.20 long tons (52.02 t); Remainder: 51.35 long tons (52.17 t)
- Loco weight: First: 64.70 long tons (65.74 t); Remainder: 65.85 long tons (66.91 t)
- Fuel type: Coal
- Fuel capacity: 4.00 long tons (4.06 t)
- Water cap.: 1,600 imp gal (7,300 L; 1,900 US gal)
- Firebox
  - Grate area: 19 sq ft (1.8 m^{2})
- Boiler: LNER diagram 7
- Boiler pressure: 170 psi (1.2 MPa)
- Cylinders: Two, inside
- Cylinder size: 18 in × 26 in (457 mm × 660 mm)
- Valve gear: Stephenson
- Valve type: Slide valves
Performance figures
- Tractive effort: 17,900 lbf (79.62 kN)
Career
- Operators: Great Northern Railway; London and North Eastern Railway; British Railways
- Class: GNR/LNER: N1
- Power class: LNER: 2; BR: 2MT
- Numbers: GNR: 190, 1551–1605; LNER: 3190, 4551–4605; 9430–9485; BR: 69430–69485
- Axle load class: LNER/BR: Route availability 5
- Withdrawn: 1947–1959
- Disposition: All scrapped

The Great Northern Railway (GNR) Class N1 was an 0-6-2T side tank steam locomotive designed by Henry Ivatt and introduced in 1906. They were all withdrawn from service between 1947 and 1959. None have survived.

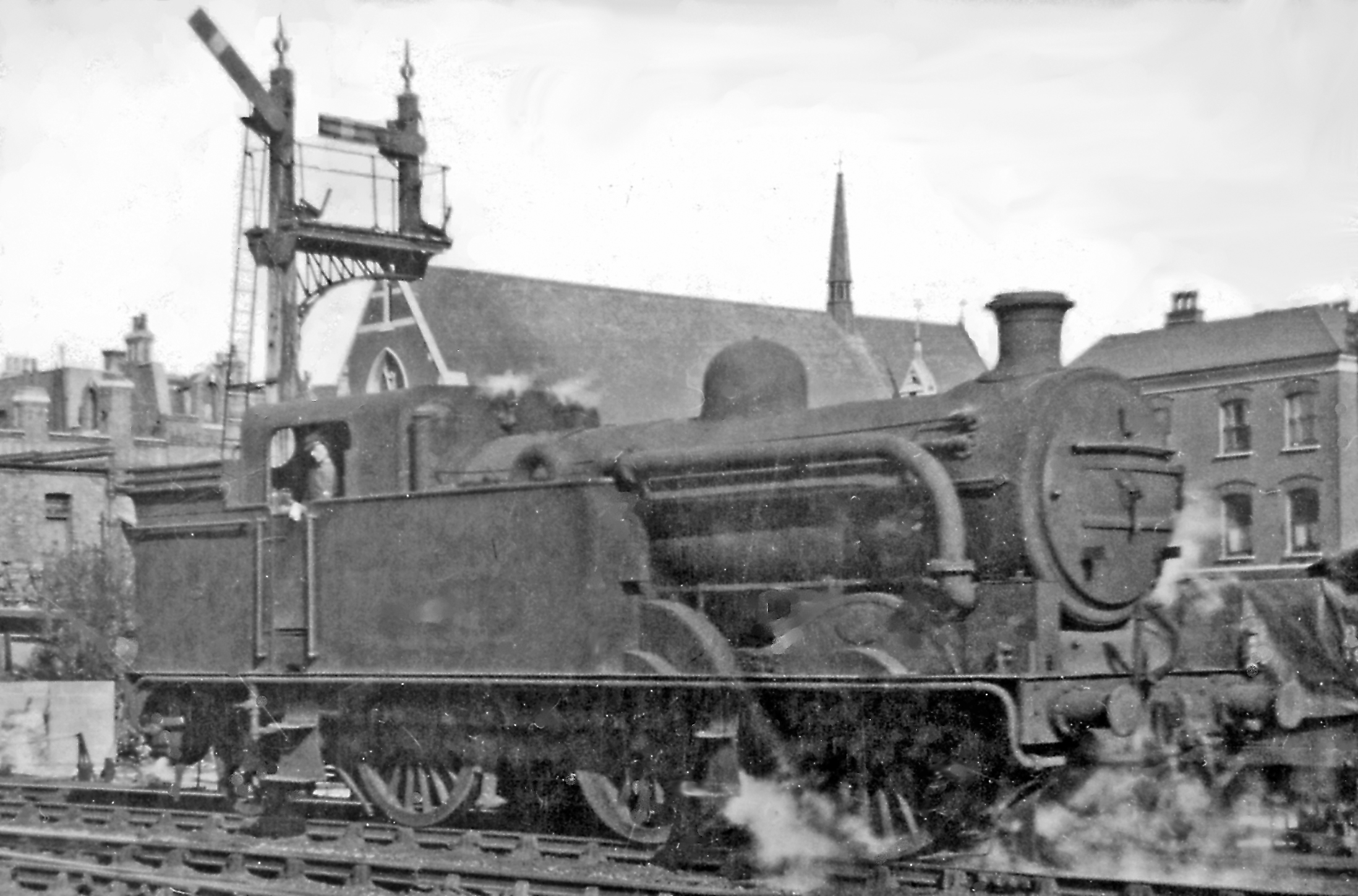
No. 9463 fitted with condensing gear at Harringay 11 October 1946

Most of the class were fitted with condensing apparatus and worked in the London area, from King's Cross and Hornsey depots, on empty coach trains, and on cross-London exchange freight trains.

In 1914, Crewe Works built an armoured train which used a Class N1 engine. The engine was covered by a 14mm steel plate, and featured observation apertures to the front and side, closed by sliding steel shutters. Two of the Ivatt tank engines No. 1587 and No. 1590 were loaned to Crewe to be fitted with armor plating and were named HMT Norna and HMT Alice respectively. They were sold back to the LNER in 1923 and had their armor plating removed.
