= South West African Class Ha =

Type of steam locomotive

GSWA Class Ha 0-6-2T South West African Class Ha 0-6-2T
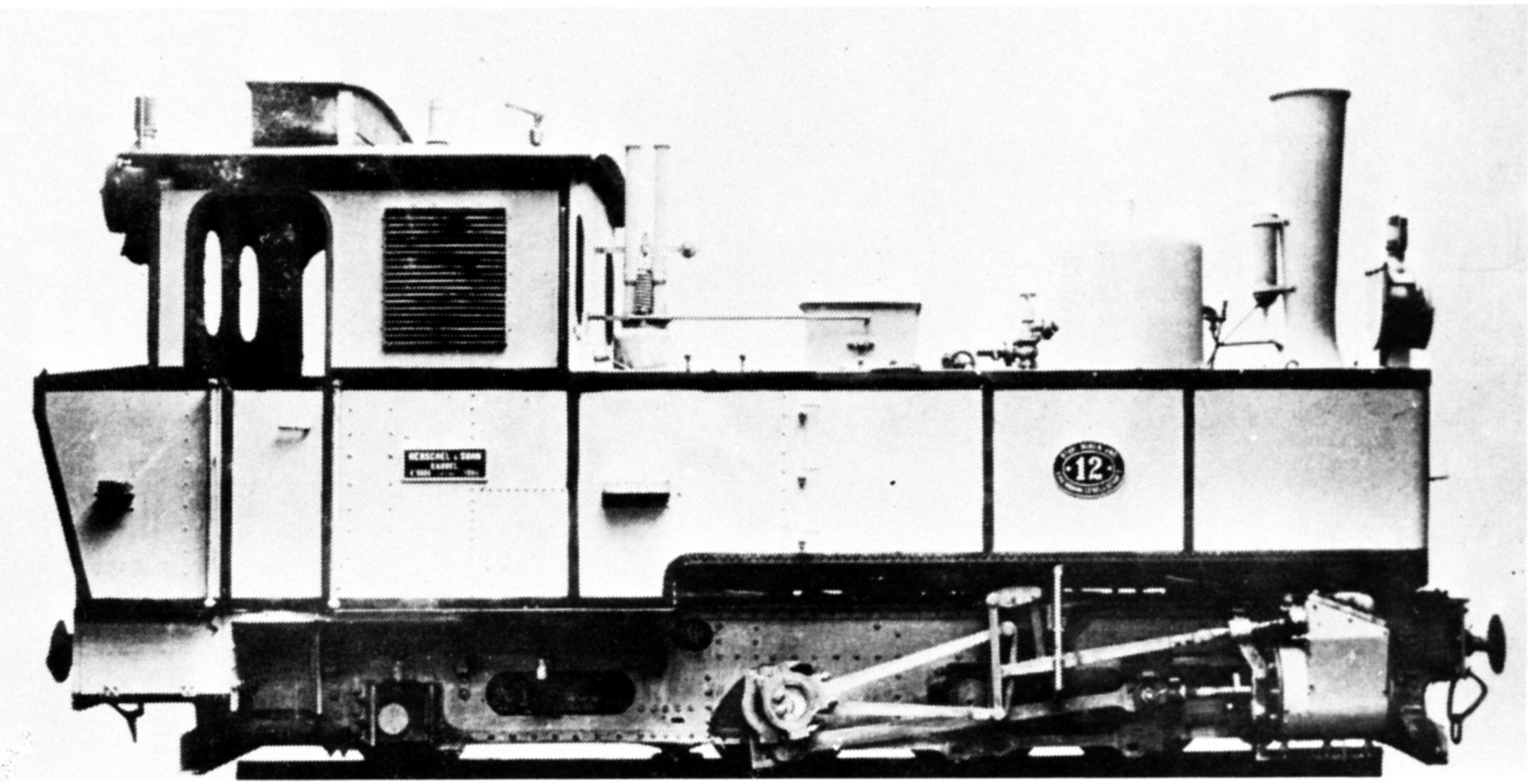
- Class Ha works picture, c. 1904
Type and origin
- Power type: Steam
- Designer: Henschel and Son
- Builder: Henschel and Son
- Serial number: 6695–6704
- Model: Class Ha
- Build date: 1903
- Total produced: 10
Specifications
- Configuration
  - Whyte: 0-6-2T
  - UIC: C1n2t
- Driver: 3rd coupled axle
- Gauge: 600 mm (1 ft 11 5/8 in) narrow
- Coupled dia.: 27 9/16 in (700 mm)
- Length
  - Over couplers: 23 ft 6 11/16 in (7,180 mm)
- Loco weight: 21 LT 6 cwt (21,640 kg)
- Fuel type: Coal
- Firebox
  - Type: Round-top
  - Grate area: 8.6 sq ft (0.80 m^{2})
- Boiler pressure: 171 psi (1,179 kPa)
- Cylinders: Two
- Cylinder size: 11 13/16 in (300 mm) bore 13 25/32 in (350 mm) stroke
- Valve gear: Allan
- Valve type: Slide
- Couplers: Buffer-and-chains
Performance figures
- Tractive effort: 8,928 lbf (39.71 kN) @ 75%
Career
- Operators: Otavi Mining and Railway Co. South African Railways
- Class: Class Ha
- Number in class: 10
- Numbers: 21–30
- Delivered: 1904
- First run: 1904

The South West African Class Ha 0-6-2T of 1904 was a steam locomotive from the German South West Africa era.

In 1904, the German administration in German South West Africa acquired ten Class Ha 0-6-2T locomotives for lease to the Otavi Mining and Railway Company. Only one of these locomotives survived the First World War to be taken onto the roster of the South African Railways.

== Manufacturer ==
In 1903, ten 600 millimetres (23.62 inches) narrow gauge 0-6-2T steam locomotives were built for the German administration in German South West Africa (GSWA) by Henschel and Son in Germany. When delivered in 1904, they were designated Class Ha.

They were leased to the Otavi Mining and Railway Company who operated a narrow gauge railway across the Namib Desert between Swakopmund and Tsumeb.

Available sources are in conflict regarding the engine numbers of these locomotives. They were delivered by Henschel with numbers in the range from 11 to 20 on their cabside number plates, but were renumbered in the range from 21 to 30 by the railway, possibly since the fifteen Jung locomotives were already numbered in the range from 1 to 15.

== Characteristics ==
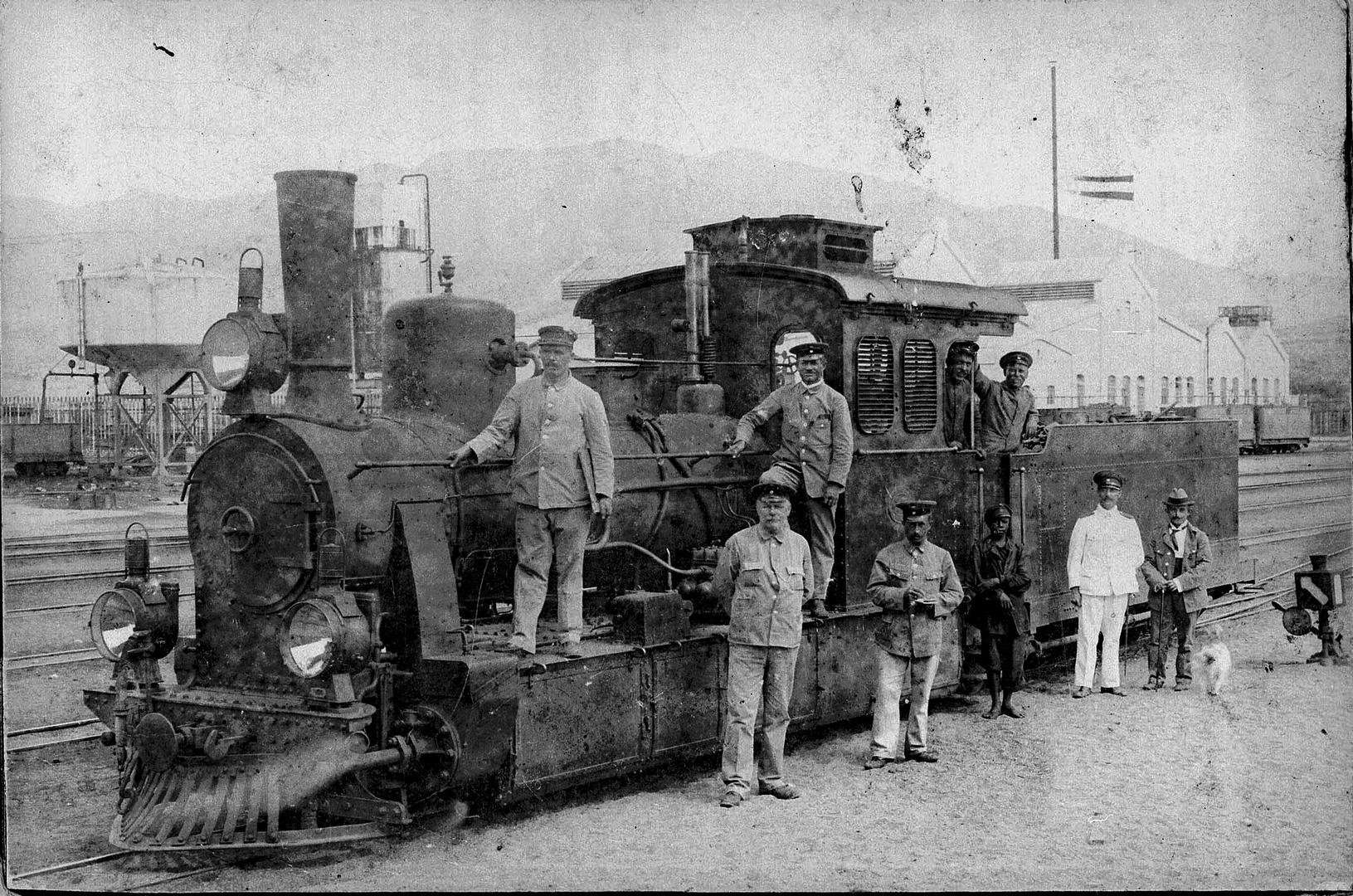
No. 27 as tender locomotive, c. 1910

The locomotives were similar to the earlier Jung locomotives in dimensions, but had larger boilers. They used Allan valve gear. Their "Ha" class designation identified the locomotive type as the first class to have been built for GSWA by Henschel.

One of these locomotives, no. 27, and possibly more were rebuilt in the Usakos Workshop for use on the Otavi Railway's fast passenger service by removing the side-tanks and coal bunker and coupling it to a tender. Similar modifications were done on two of the Jung locomotives.

== Service ==
During the First World War, the former German colony came under South African administration and the railways in GSWA came under control of the Union Defence Forces. Control of all railway operations in South West Africa (SWA) was passed on from the Military to the Director of Railways in Windhoek on 1 August 1915. On 1 April 1922, all the railway lines and rolling stock in the territory became part of the South African Railways (SAR).

Only one of these locomotives, no. 22, survived the First World War into the SAR era. It retained its German Colonial Ha class designation and engine number in SAR service.

== Other locomotive types ==
At least two other locomotive types also served on the Otavi Railway, but information about them is sketchy. Even though they are reputed to have been built by Henschel, they do not appear in the Henschel works list.

- In 1903, a small side-tank engine with a four-wheeled tender was supplied. Its chimney and spark arrestor were of the inverted conical type. The wheel arrangement of the engine is not known, but the boiler pressure was set at 176 pounds per square inch (1,213 kilopascals) and the tractive effort at 75% of boiler pressure was 4,930 pounds-force (21.9 kilonewtons). The tender carried 2 long tons 10 hundredweight (2.5 tonnes) of coal and the engine's side tanks had a capacity of 1,210 imperial gallons (5,500 litres).
- In the same year, two small shunting engines were supplied. They had a 2-2-2 Patentee type wheel arrangement and were numbered 28 and 29. It had two cylinders of 12 inches (305 millimetres) bore and 13 inches (330 millimetres) stroke and driving wheels of 33 7/8 inches (860 millimetres) diameter. The boiler pressure was set at 176 pounds per square inch (1,213 kilopascals) and the tractive effort at 75% of boiler pressure was 4,930 pounds-force (21.9 kilonewtons). The engine weight in working order was 18 long tons (18,290 kilograms).

Since construction of the 600 millimetres (23.62 inches) narrow gauge Otavi Railway commenced in November 1903, the date of entry into service of these two locomotive types suggests that they were acquired as construction engines.

In 1914, Henschel shipped two 4-6-2 locomotives to Swakopmund for the Otavi Railway, with works numbers 12829 and 12830. They were to have been numbered 31 and 32, but were lost at sea when their ship was sunk.
