= South West African Jung =

Narrow gauge steam locomotive

GSWA Jung 0-6-2T South West African Jung 0-6-2T
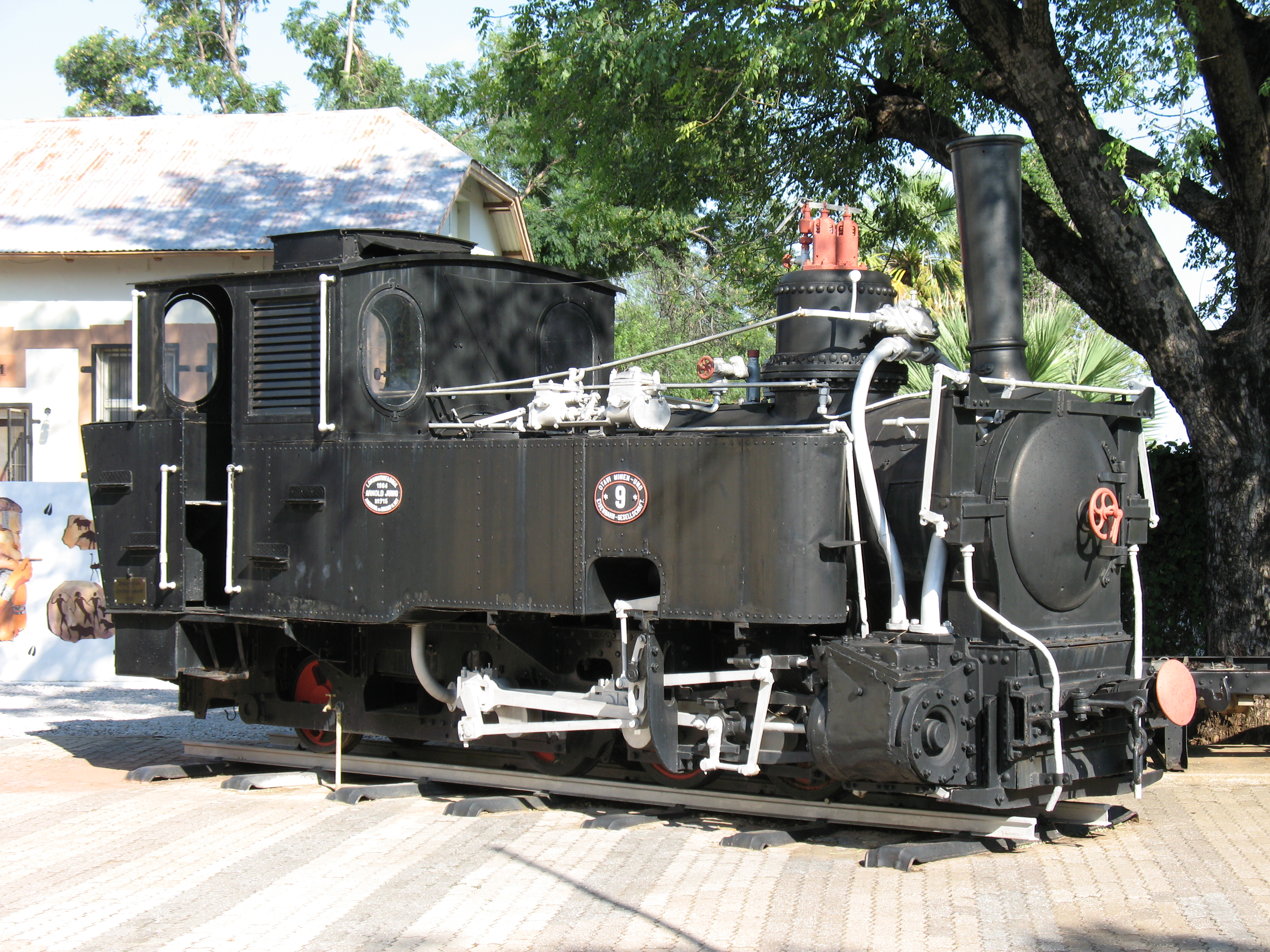
- No. 9 plinthed in Tsumeb, 17 February 2011
Type and origin
- Power type: Steam
- Designer: Arnold Jung Lokomotivfabrik
- Builder: Arnold Jung Lokomotivfabrik
- Serial number: 707–716, 804–808
- Build date: 1903
- Total produced: 15
Specifications
- Configuration
  - Whyte: 0-6-2T
  - UIC: C1n2t
- Driver: 3rd coupled axle
- Gauge: 600 mm (1 ft 11 5/8 in) narrow
- Coupled dia.: 27 9/16 in (700 mm)
- Wheelbase: 11 ft 7 3/4 in (3,550 mm)
  - Axle spacing (Asymmetrical): 1-2: 2 ft 8 3/4 in (832 mm); 2-3: 2 ft 10 1/2 in (876 mm)
  - Coupled: 5 ft 7 1/4 in (1,708 mm)
  - Tender: 16 ft 5 in (5,004 mm)
- Length
  - Over couplers: 22 ft 9 1/2 in (6,947 mm) (0-6-2T); 39 ft 6 3/4 in (12,059 mm) (0-6-2)
  - Over beams: 19 ft 4 1/2 in (5,906 mm) (0-6-2T)
- Width: 6 ft 10 in (2,083 mm)
- Height: 10 ft 4 in (3,150 mm)
- Frame type: Plate
- Loco weight: 21 LT 12 cwt (21,950 kg)
- Tender type: 2-axle bogies
- Fuel type: Coal
- Fuel capacity: 15 long hundredweight (0.8 t)
- Water cap.: 770 imp gal (3,500 L)
- Tender cap.: 2 LT 10 cwt (2.5 t) coal 1,188 imp gal (5,400 L) water
- Firebox
  - Type: Round-top
  - Grate area: 7.7 sq ft (0.72 m^{2})
- Boiler
  - Pitch: 4 ft 6 1/2 in (1,384 mm)
- Boiler pressure: 171 psi (1,179 kPa)
- Heating surface
  - Firebox: 38.5 sq ft (3.58 m^{2})
- Cylinders: Two
- Cylinder size: 11 13/16 in (300 mm) bore 13 25/32 in (350 mm) stroke
- Valve gear: Heusinger
- Valve type: Murdoch's D slide
- Couplers: Buffer-and-chains
Performance figures
- Tractive effort: 8,928 lbf (39.71 kN) @ 75%
Career
- Operators: Otavi Mining and Railway Co. South African Railways
- Number in class: 15
- Numbers: 1–15
- Delivered: 1904
- First run: 1904

The South West African Jung 0-6-2T of 1904 was a narrow gauge steam locomotive from the German South West Africa era.

In 1904, the Otavi Mining and Railway Company in German South West Africa acquired fifteen 0-6-2T locomotives from Arnold Jung Lokomotivfabrik in Germany. Two of them survived the First World War to be taken onto the South African Railways roster in 1922.

== The Otavi Railway ==
Construction of the 600 millimetres (23.62 inches) narrow gauge Otavi Railway in German South West Africa (GSWA), which heads northeastward from Swakopmund via Usakos and Otjiwarongo, commenced in November 1903. The 351-mile-long (565-kilometre) line was completed through Otavi and on to Tsumeb in August 1906, with a 56-mile-long (90-kilometre) branch line from Otavi to Grootfontein. From Swakopmund to Usakos, the line ran more or less parallel and to the north of the original Swakopmund-Windhuk Staatsbahn or Nordbahn, which had been constructed from 1897.

In 1905, a short 14 kilometres (9 miles) branchline was constructed from Onguati near Usakos on the Otavi line to Karibib on the Nordbahn to create an alternative line from Windhoek to the Atlantic Ocean at times when the Nordbahn's section through the Khan River gorge suffered from the occasional flooding.

The Otavi Railway, the longest narrow gauge railway in the world, was an industrial enterprise of the Otavi Mining and Railway Company. The railway was constructed by Messrs. Arthur Koppel and Company at a cost of about £2,400 per mile. It was well-built with a ruling gradient of about 1 in 66 (1½%) and minimum curvature of 150 metres (492 feet). The tracks were laid with 30 pounds per yard (15 kilograms per metre) steel rails on 26 pounds (12 kilograms) steel sleepers. From sea level at Swakopmund, the railway rose to an altitude of 3,500 feet (1,067 metres) at Ebony, then dropped to an altitude of 2,640 feet (805 metres) at Usakos and then rose to its highest elevation of 5,200 feet (1,585 metres) at Kalkveld.

On 1 April 1910, the Otavi Railway and its assets were purchased by the German Administration for £1,000,000 under a lease agreement in terms of which the mining company would continue to operate the line for a further ten years. As a result, the problematic Khan River section of the Nordbahn line could finally be abandoned.

== Manufacturer ==
The first mainline locomotives for the Otavi Railway were these fifteen 0-6-2T steam locomotives, numbered in the range from 1 to 15, which were built by Arnold Jung Lokomotivfabrik in Germany in 1904.

== Characteristics ==
They used Heusinger valve gear to actuate Murdoch's D slide valves and were built on 5/8 inch (16 millimetres) thick plate frames which were arranged outside the coupled and trailing wheels. Their coal bunkers had a capacity of 15 long hundredweight (0.8 tonnes), while their side tanks carried 770 imperial gallons (3,500 litres) of water.

== Service ==
Until the railway was completed in 1906, these locomotives also served as construction engines. Since the Otavi railway traversed the Namib Desert, the engines were often seen with rectangular auxiliary water tenders in tow.

During the First World War, the former German Colony came under South African administration and the railways in GSWA came under control of the Union Defence Forces. Control of all railway operations in South West Africa (SWA) was passed on from the Military to the Director of Railways in Windhoek on 1 August 1915. On 1 April 1922, all the railway lines and rolling stock in the territory became part of the South African Railways (SAR), but the SWA locomotives were never reclassified or renumbered and retained their former German identities until they were withdrawn from service.

Two of the Jung locomotives survived into the SAR era, no. 1 and no. 13, the rest by then having either been scrapped or, like no. 9 which is preserved at Tsumeb, sold to industry. Both SAR locomotives had been modified to tank-and-tender engines for use on the Otavi Railway's fast passenger service. Their coal bunkers were removed and they were equipped with tenders, supplied by Henschel and Son, which ran on four-wheeled bogies and had a capacity of 2 long tons 10 hundredweight (2.5 tonnes) coal and 1,188 imperial gallons (5,400 litres) water. Similar tenders had been fitted to modified Class Ha locomotives.

== Works numbers ==
The locomotive numbers and Jung works numbers are listed in the table.

GSWA Jung 0-6-2T
Loco no.	Works no.
1	707
2	708
3	709
4	710
5	711
6	712
7	713
8	714
9	715
10	716
11	804
12	805
13	806
14	807
15	808

== Illustration ==
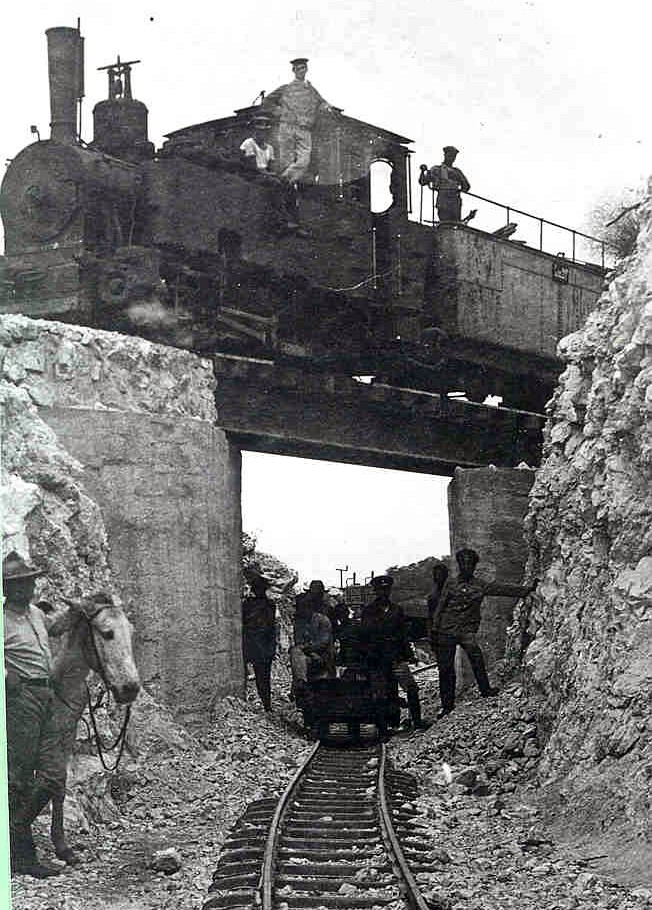
Jung engine and tender, c. 1905

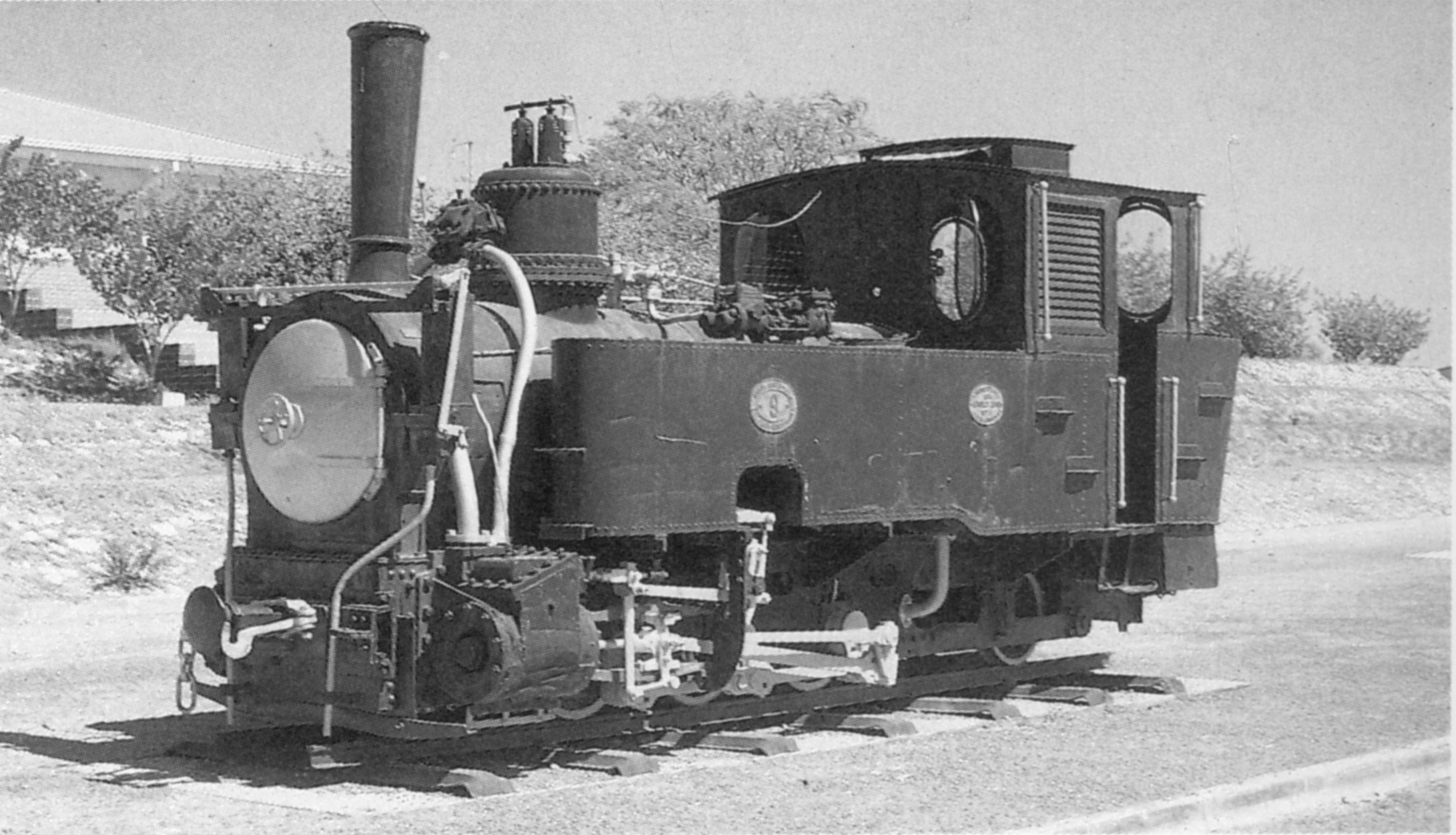
Jung 0-6-2T no. 9 plinthed at Tsumeb

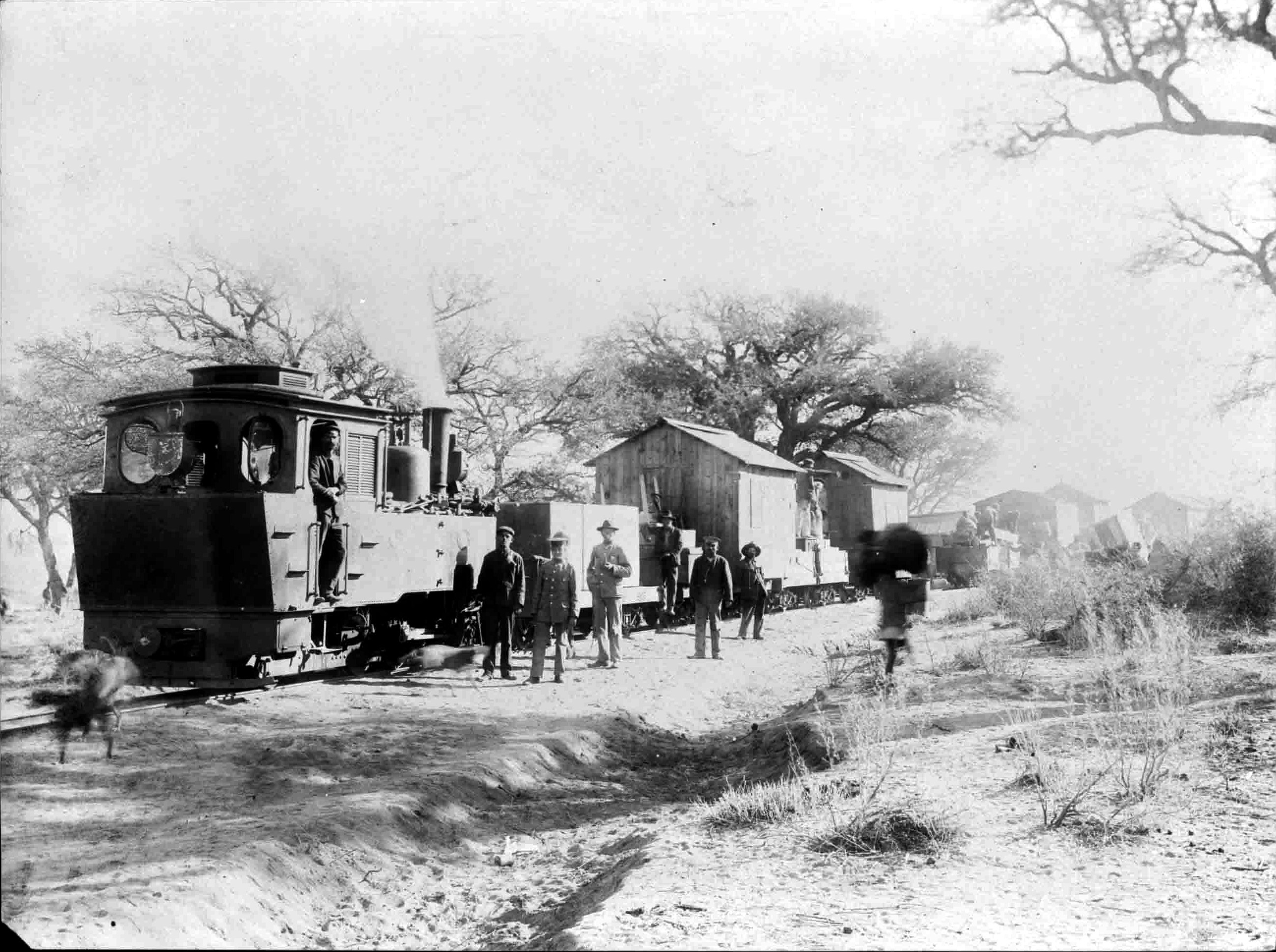
Jung locomotive on a work train near Ababis, c. 1906

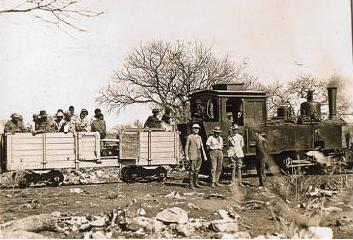
Jung 0-6-2T no. 1 on a work train near Tsumeb
