= Egyptian Republic Railways 4211 class =

Type and origin
- Power type: diesel
- Builder: Arnold Jung Lokomotivfabrik
- Serial number: 1955–56 batch 12161–12187
- Build date: 1953; 1955–56
- Total produced: 42
Specifications
- Configuration
  - Whyte: 0-6-0
- Gauge: 1,435 mm (4 ft 8 1/2 in)
- Loco weight: 66.2 long tons (67.3 t; 74.1 short tons)
- Cylinders: 8
- Cylinder size: 8.5 in × 10 in (216 mm × 254 mm)
Performance figures
- Power output: 360 bhp (270 kW)
Career
- Operators: Egyptian State Railways; Israel Railways
- Class: 4211
- Number in class: 42
- Numbers: 4211 – 4252
- Nicknames: "Abdel Nasser" (in Israel)
- Locale: Egypt; after 1956 one in Israel
- Delivered: 1953; 1955–56
- First run: 1953
- Disposition: one captured by Israel in 1956 and scrapped 1970

The Egyptian Republic Railways 4211 class was a class of 0-6-0 diesel shunter introduced on Egyptian Republic Railways (now Egyptian National Railways) in the 1950s. Arnold Jung Lokomotivfabrik in Jungenthal, Rheinland-Pfalz, Germany built the first batch of 15 in 1953 and the second batch of 27 in 1955–56.

During the 1956 Israeli invasion of Sinai number 4239 (Jung works number 21646) was captured in Sinai on the former Palestine Railways line between El Kantara East and Gaza. It was taken into Israel Railways and renumbered 251. It was little used and in about 1970 it was scrapped.

== Sources ==
- Cotterell, Paul (1984). The Railways of Palestine and Israel. Abingdon: Tourret Publishing. ISBN 0-905878-04-3.
- Hughes, Hugh (1981). Middle East Railways. Harrow: Continental Railway Circle. ISBN 0-9503469-7-7.
