= 0-6-2 =

Locomotive wheel arrangement

- Front of locomotive at left

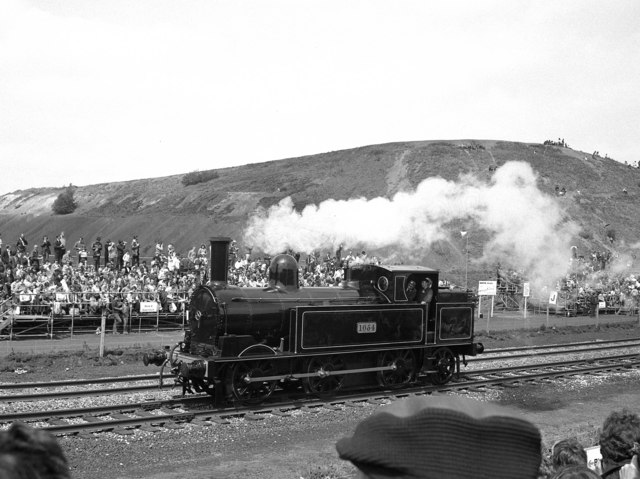
- Webb Coal Tank
Equivalent classifications
- UIC class: C1, C1'
- French class: 031
- Turkish class: 34
- Swiss class: 3/4
- Russian class: 0-3-1
First known tank engine version
- First use: 1880
- Country: United Kingdom
- Railway: Lancashire and Yorkshire Railway
- Designer: William Barton Wright
First known tender engine version
- First use: 1890
- Country: Cape of Good Hope
- Locomotive: Clara Class
- Railway: Namaqualand Railway
- Designer: Kitson and Company
- Builder: Kitson and Company

Under the Whyte notation for the classification of steam locomotives, 0-6-2 represents the wheel arrangement of no leading wheels, six powered and coupled driving wheels on three axles and two trailing wheels on one axle. This type is sometimes known as a Branchliner or Webb type.

== Overview ==
While some locomotives with this wheel arrangement had tenders, the majority were tank locomotives which carried their coal and water on board.

== Usage ==
=== Finland ===
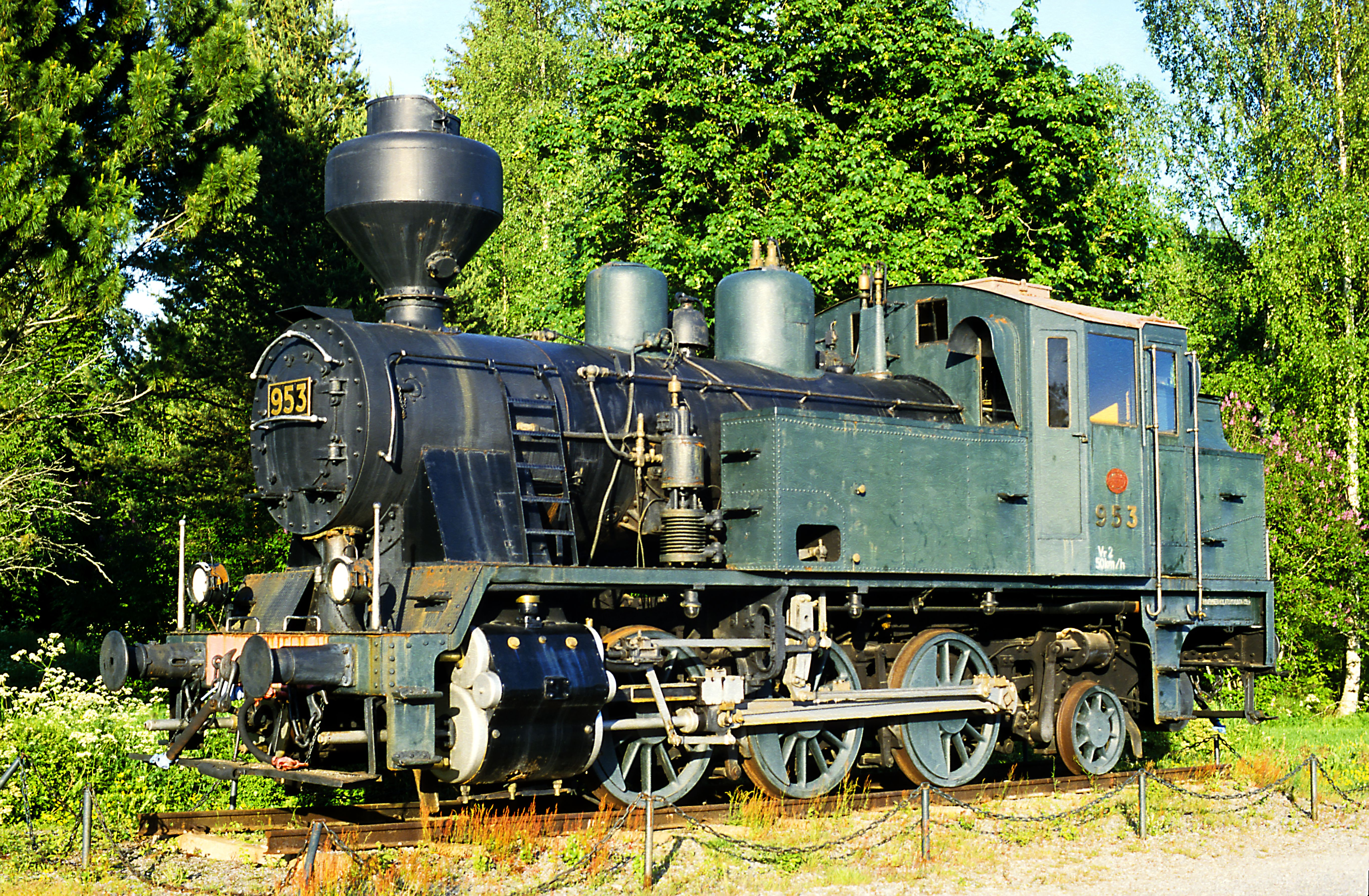
Class Vr2 at Haapamäki, Finland

Finland used two classes of 0-6-2T locomotive, the Vr2 and the Vr5.

The Vr2 class was numbered in the range from 950 to 965. Five of them are preserved in Finland, no. 950 at Joensuu, no. 951 at Tuuri, no. 953 at Haapamäki, no. 961 at Jyväskylä and no. 964 at the Veturimuseo at Toijala.

The Vr5 class was numbered in the range from 1400 to 1423. No. 1422 is preserved at Haapamäki.

=== Indonesia ===
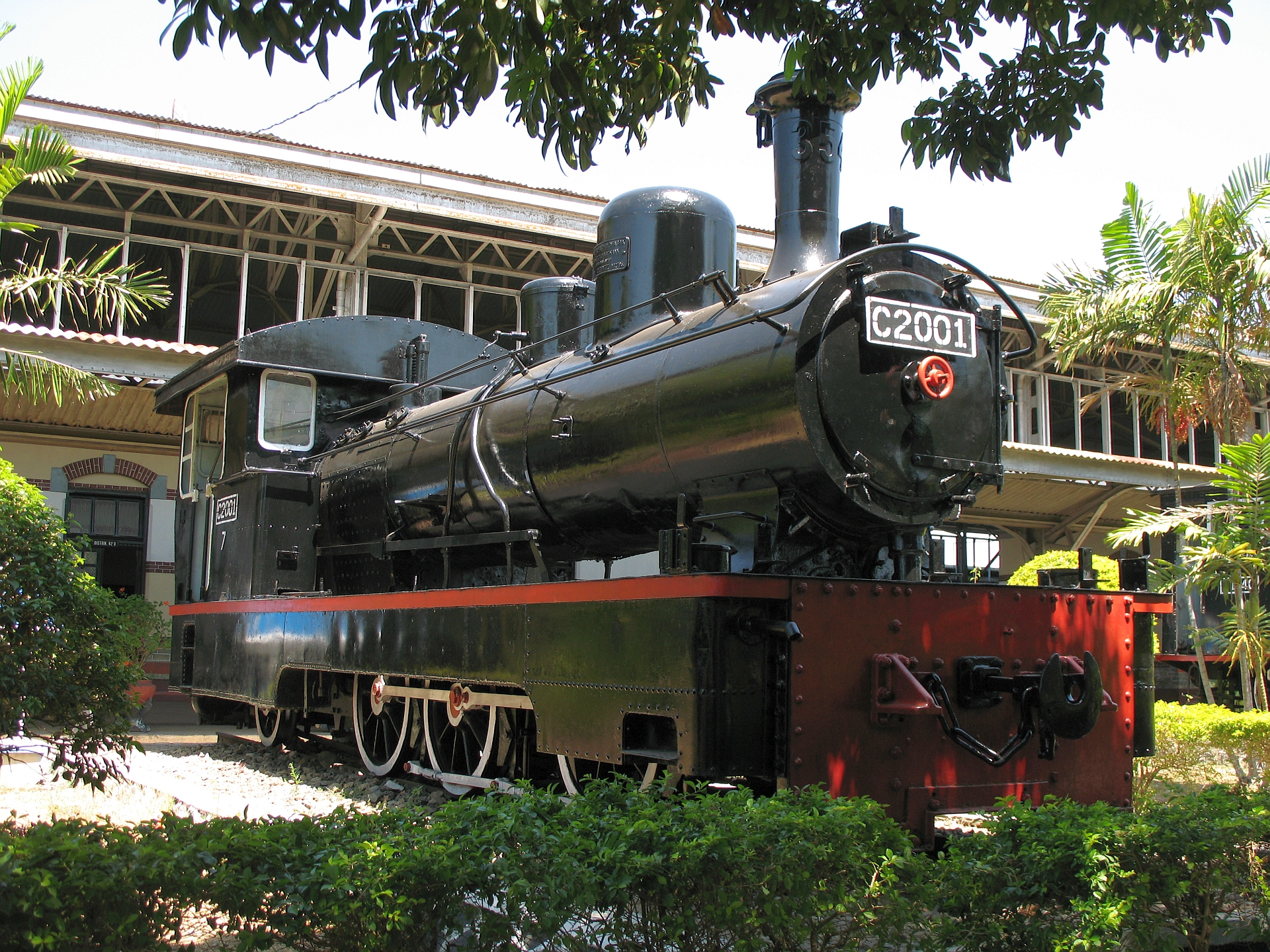
NIS 351 or DKA C20 01 at Ambarawa Railway Museum (2008)

Nederlandsch Indische Spoorweg Maatschappij or NIS received 10 0-6-2Ts (skirt tank) from Sächsische Maschinenfabrik (Hartmann) in 1903 and 1912 for mixed passenger and freight trains on the 3 ft 6 in (1067 mm) Gundih–Gambringan–Cepu–Surabaya NIS, as well as sugarcane trains on Solo–Wonogiri–Baturetno lines. A 0-6-2T also worked on Batavia–Buitenzorg line. These 0-6-2Ts were classified as NIS Class 350 (351–360) using both wood and coal as fuel. However, the NIS 350s used teak wood more often due to the depletion of coal supplies. Teak wood is easy to obtain along the Gundih–Surabaya line, especially in the vicinity of Bojonegoro where there are still many teak forests.

The NIS 350s were limited by the position of the tanks and had a water capacity of only 3 m^{3} (790 US gal). This small tank capacity limits the operating range of NIS 350s that had to haul NIS essential commodity trains on certain routes. They quickly ran out of water and had to frequently stop at stations to refuel. To overcome this, especially during the dry season, a water tower or reservoir was built at each station. After Japanese occupation and Indonesian Independence, the locomotives were reclassified as C20. The C20 locomotive has a length of 9420 mm and weighs 33.5 tons, and able to run a maximum speed of 60 km/h (37 mph). Of the 10 built only C20 01 is preserved at Ambarawa Railway Museum, Central Java.

=== Philippines ===
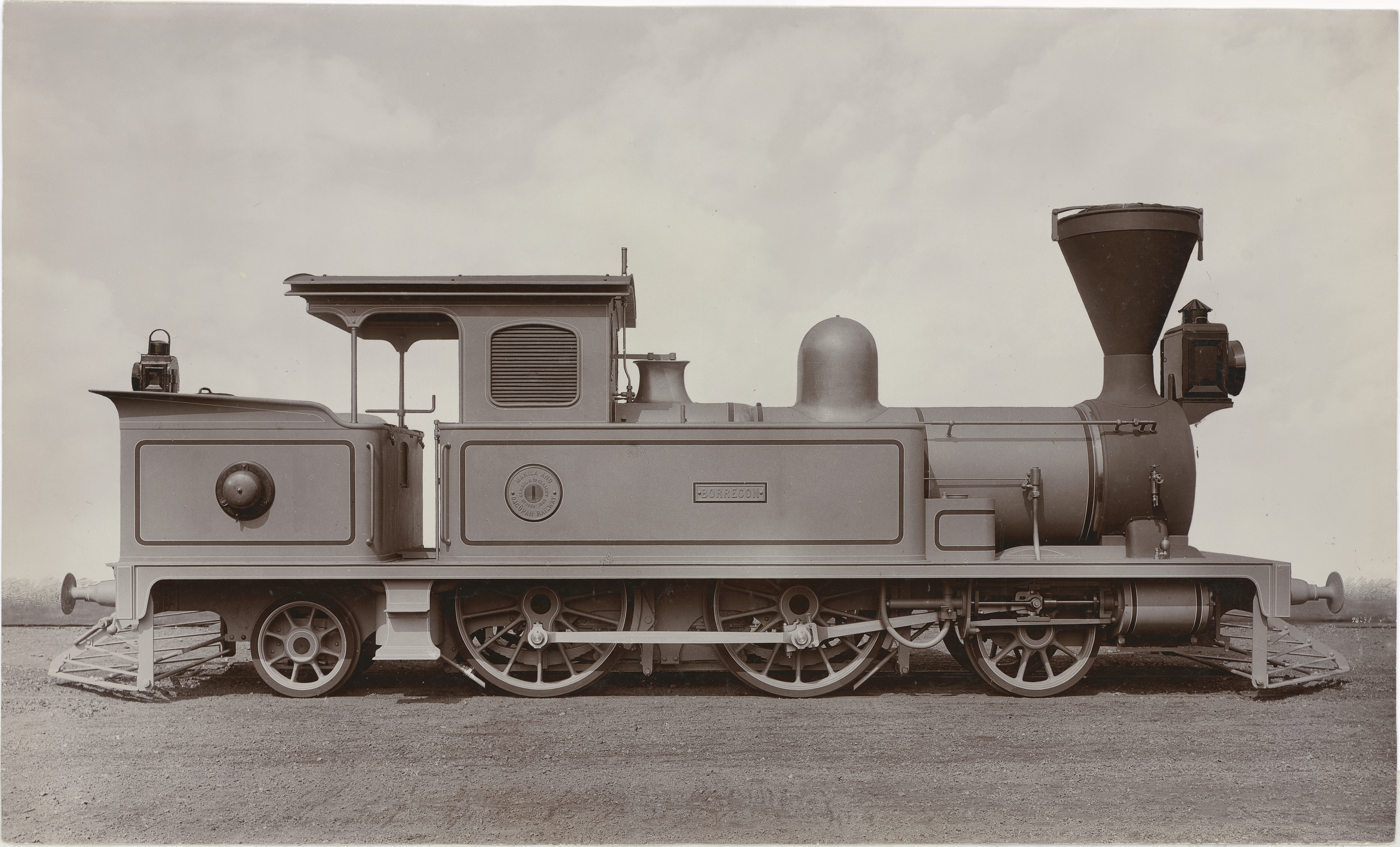
Borrecon, the first mainline locomotive in Philippine service.

==== Tank locomotives ====
There were 30 Dagupan-type locomotives built between 1889 and 1890. All were tank locomotives, weighed 32 tonnes (71,000 lb) and were run a maximum speed of 33 km/h (21 mph). These were divided into two subclasses: the A subclass built by Neilson and Company and the B subclass built by Dübs and Company.

Another 25 locomotives of the C class were built in 1906 by the North British Locomotive Company (which succeeded Dübs) and were regarded as distinct from the Dagupan class.

During the Manila Railroad era, they were replaced in mainline service by American tender locomotives such as the Porter 4-6-0 built in 1919 or the 4-6-2 Pacifics built by Baldwin Locomotive Works between 1926 and 1929.

A B-class locomotive named Urdaneta (No. 17) remained in shunting service until 1963 and is one of only three steam locomotives preserved by the PNR. After its retirement, Urdaneta was first displayed in the Tutuban station. It is now on static display in Dagupan, Pangasinan. The rest were scrapped between 1917 and 1940.

==== Tender locomotives ====
Ma-Ao Sugar Central of Negros Occidental had locomotive No. 8, a rebuild of a saddle tank locomotive built in 1920. It was last seen in January 1982 and was presumed to have been scrapped not long after due to the mill being in a decrepit state during those years.

=== South Africa ===
==== Tender locomotives ====
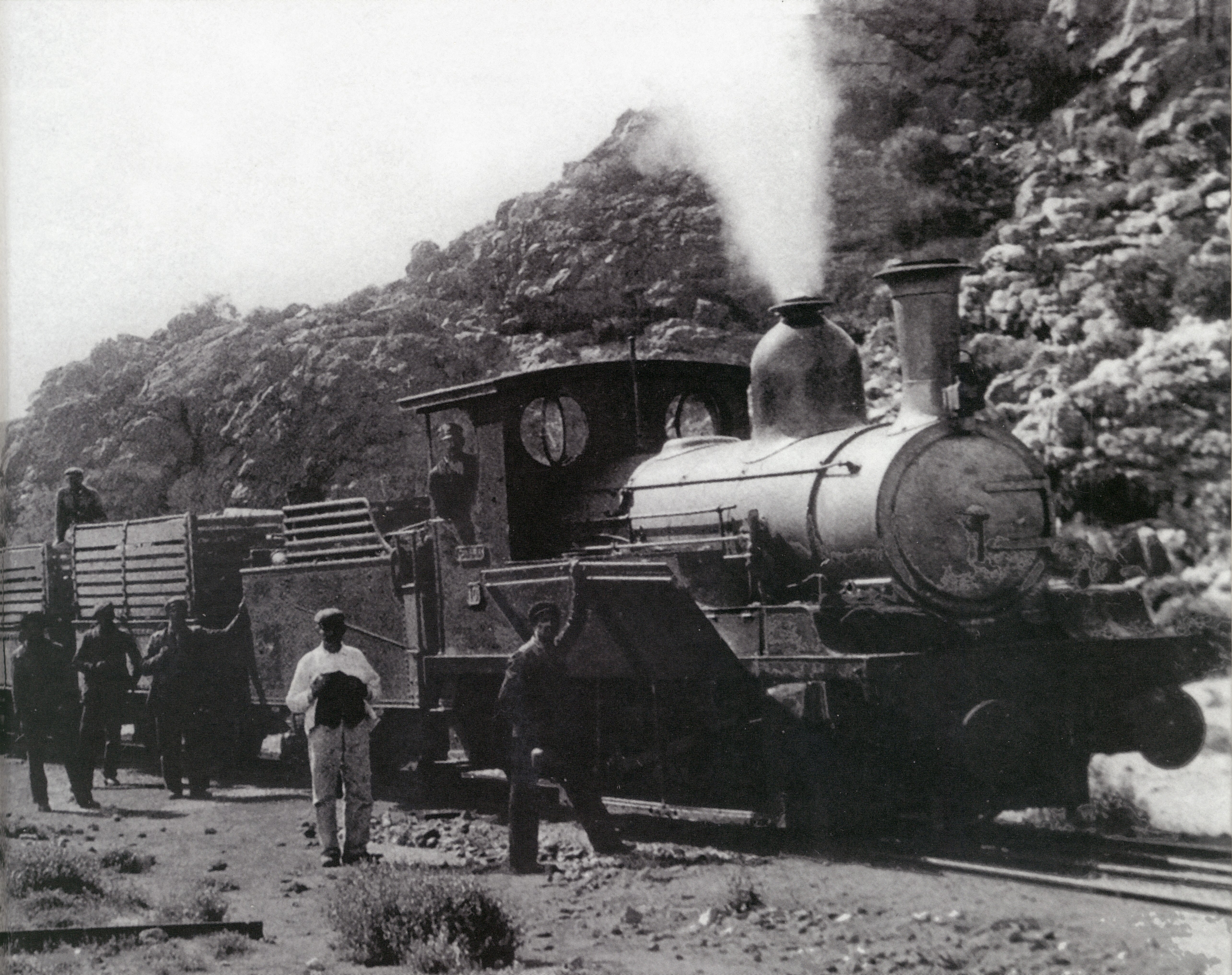
Cape Copper Company 0-6-2 Scotia Class, c. 1910

Between 1890 and 1898, four 0-6-2 tender locomotives were placed in service by the Cape Copper Company on its 2 ft 6 in (762 mm) gauge Namaqualand Railway between Port Nolloth and O'okiep in the Cape Colony. Acquired to meet the traffic needs of the upper mountainous section of the line, they became known as the Mountain type. The first three of these locomotives were later described as the Clara Class, while the fourth was included in this Class by some and included in the subsequent Scotia Class by others.

Between 1900 and 1905, six more Mountain type 0-6-2 tender locomotives were placed in service by the Cape Copper Company. Later described as the Scotia Class, they were similar to the earlier Clara Class locomotives, but with longer boilers, longer fireboxes and larger firegrates.

==== Tank locomotive ====
In 1892 and 1893, the Nederlandsche-Zuid-Afrikaansche Spoorweg-Maatschappij of the Zuid-Afrikaansche Republiek (Transvaal Republic) placed twenty 3 ft 6 in (1,067 mm) Cape gauge 0-6-2T locomotives in mainline service. Since the railway classified its locomotives according to their weight, these locomotives were known as the 40 Tonners.

=== South West Africa ===
Three classes of 600 mm (1 ft 11 5/8 in) gauge 0-6-2 locomotives were supplied to German South West Africa between 1904 and 1908.

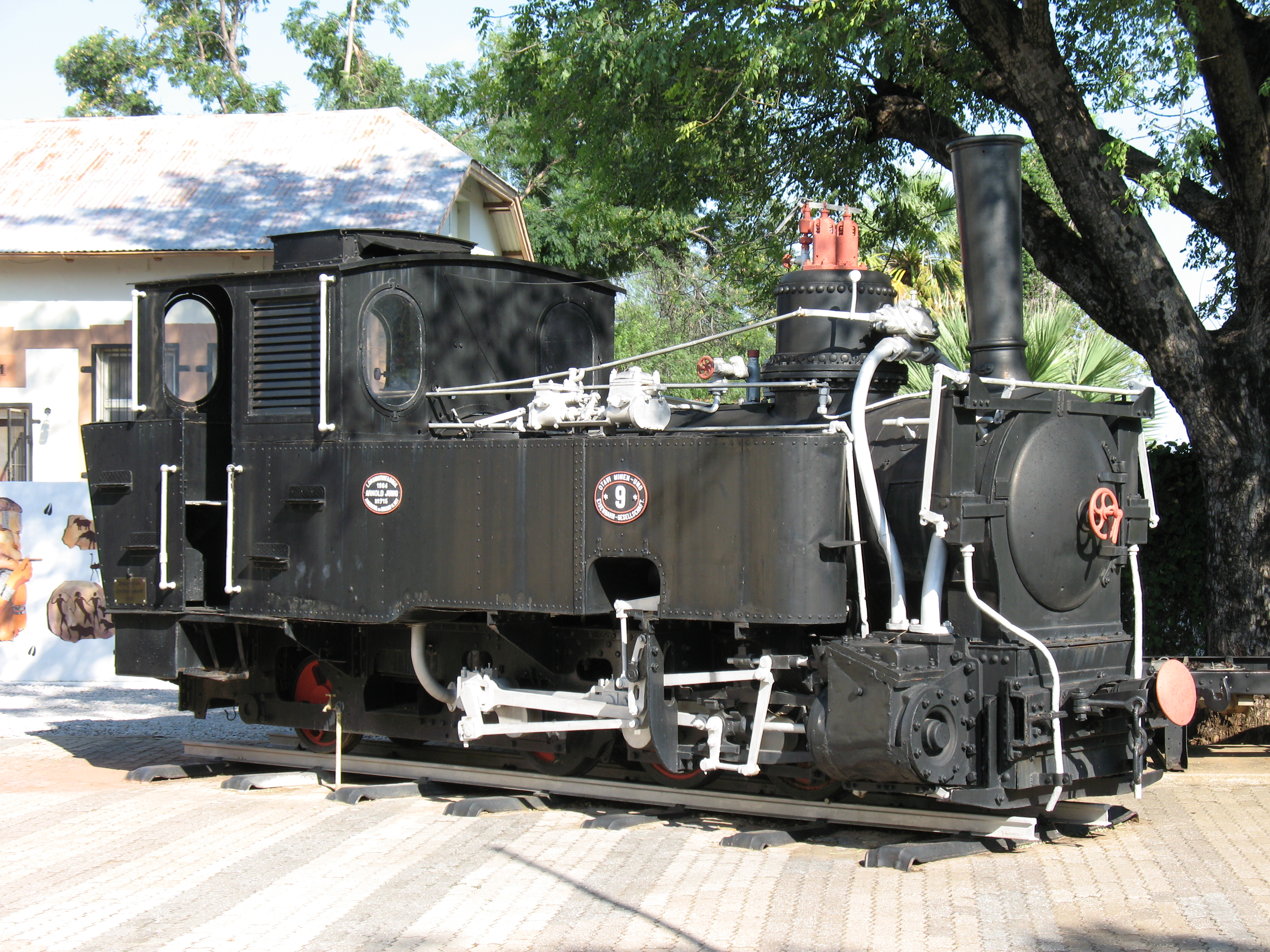
Jung no. 9 plinthed in Tsumeb

- In 1904, the Otavi Mining and Railway Company acquired fifteen tank locomotives from Arnold Jung Lokomotivfabrik in Germany. Two of them survived to be taken onto the South African Railways (SAR) roster in 1922. They were never classified and were referred to as the Jung locomotives.
- Ten Class Ha tank locomotives were supplied by Henschel & Son in 1904. One survived the First World War into the SAR era.
- Fifteen Class Hb tank locomotives were supplied by Henschel between 1905 and 1908. The last six locomotives were delivered as tank-and-tender engines, equipped with optional coal and water tenders. Six of them survived into the SAR era.

=== United Kingdom ===
In the United Kingdom, the type was only ever used for tank engines and was first used by William Barton Wright of the Lancashire and Yorkshire Railway in 1880 with the L&YR Barton Wright 0-6-2T.

The arrangement was soon afterwards used by Francis Webb of the London and North Western Railway on his famous Coal Tanks of 1881–1897. Many locomotives of this type were also used to haul coal in the South Wales Valleys by the Great Western Railway and its predecessors, where the arrangement proved sufficiently successful to lead to the development of the GWR 56xx class in 1924.

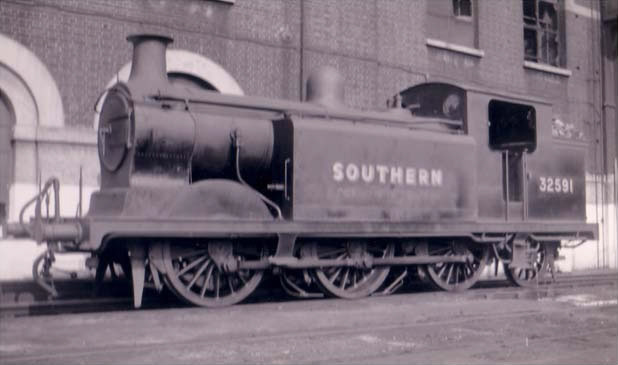
LB&SCR E5 class of 1902

Several railways around London later used the type for heavy suburban passenger trains, notably the following:

- The London, Brighton and South Coast Railway (LB&SCR) with the E3, E4, E5 and E6 classes designed by R. J. Billinton between 1894 and 1904.
- The Great Eastern Railway (GER) Class L77 of 1914, designed by Alfred John Hill.
- The Great Northern Railway (GNR) Class N1 designed by Ivatt, and Class N2, designed by Nigel Gresley between 1906 and 1921.

Gresley later improved upon the GER class with various versions of his London and North Eastern Railway (LNER) N7 class, built between 1925 and 1928.

==== Lambton Tanks ====
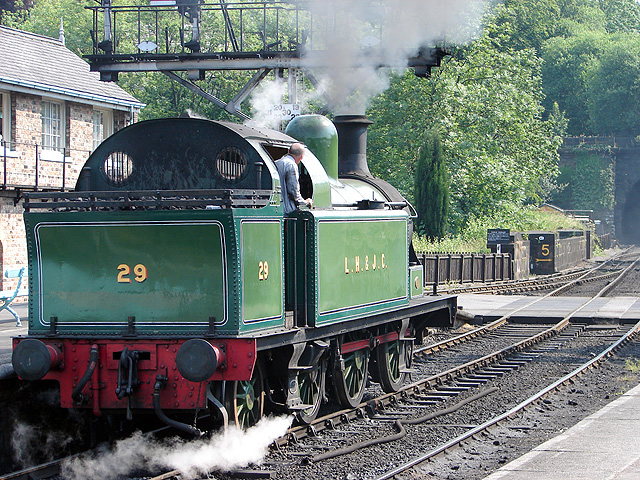
The pioneering Lambton Tank, 29, seen preserved on the North Yorkshire Moors Railway.

In 1904, the Lambton Railway ordered their first 0-6-2T from Kitson & Co. to use on the collery systems. This proved to be successful over the next few years a further 6 0-6-2T were ordered, 2 in 1907 provided by Kitson, 2 in 1909 provided by Robert Stephenson & Co., another provided by Stephenson in 1920, and a final in 1934 provided by Hawthorn Leslie. In 1931, the railway bought 5 0-6-2Ts from the Great Western Railway, three of which were from the former Taff Vale Railway, and the remainder from the Cardiff Railway.

=== United States ===
The primary usage of 0-6-2 types in the United States were Tank locomotives. Many were found in the state of Hawaii on sugar cane railroads across the state. Most notable were the 0-6-2T's of the Mcbryde Sugar Company of Kauai, 3 of which survive and are currently the only original steam engines operating in Hawaii.
