= Bröl Valley Railway =

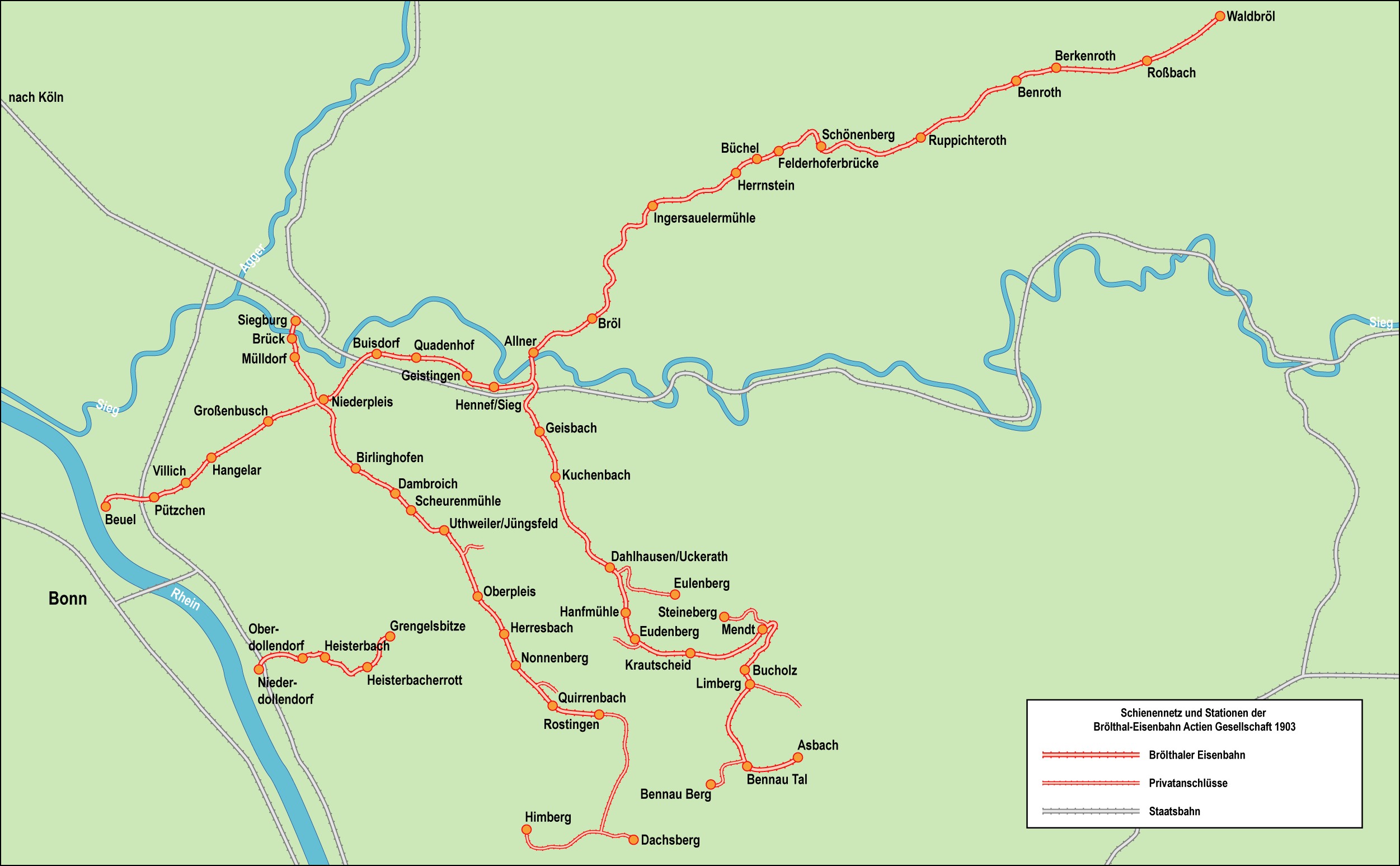

Overview
- Native name: Bröltalbahn/ Rhein-Sieg-Eisenbahn

Technical
- Line length: 87.3 km
- Track gauge: 785 mm (2 ft 6 29/32 in)

The Bröl Valley Railway (German: Bröltalbahn) was the first public narrow gauge railway in Germany and had a track gauge of 785 mm (2 ft 6 29/32 in). It was the heart of a railway company, which from 1925 also ran bus services and from 1956 its passenger services only ran by road. Goods trains continued to run until 1967, when the remaining trackage was lifted.

The firm was founded on 3 February 1869 as the Bröl Valley Railway Company (Brölthaler Eisenbahn-Actien-Gesellschaft) or BTE. On 10 June 1921 it was renamed as the Rhine-Sieg Railway (Rhein-Sieg-Eisenbahn-AG) or RSE. The company headquarters was moved in 1917 from Hennef (Sieg) to Beuel. In 1983 the RSE went into the Rhein-Sieg-Verkehrsgesellschaft. It should not be confused with the Rhein-Sieg-Eisenbahn GmbH founded in 1994 by the Verkehrsclub Deutschland.

The 785 mm (2 ft 6 29/32 in) gauge railway network of the Bröl Valley Railway was, at its peak, a total of 87.3 kilometres (54.2 mi) long and, towards the end, was mainly worked by goods services. With the take over of the Heisterbach Valley Railway in 1901 an isolated section of 750 mm (2 ft 5 1/2 in) gauge line also belonged to the BTE.

In the old Bröl Valley Railway engine shed in Asbach is a railway museum about the old railway that was founded in 2000.

== Literature ==
Sources

- Adolf Becker (1988), Rhein-Sieg-Verkehrsgesellschaft mbH (ed.), Die Bröltalbahn – Rhein-Sieg-Eisenbahn (in German) (1. ed.), Niederkassel-Mondorf: Verlag Kersting, ISBN 3-925250-05-0
- Sascha Koch: Eisenbahnen im Oberbergischen und die Geschichte des Bahnbetriebswerkes Dieringhausen. Galunder Verlag, Nümbrecht, 2005. ISBN 3-89909-050-0.

Others

- Manfred Frickhöfer: Die Rhein-Sieg-Eisenbahn (Bröltalbahn). Druck: quickprint grube & speck, Karlsruhe 1979.
- Carsten Gussmann, Wolfgang Clössner: Die Heisterbacher Talbahn und Industriebahnen im Siebengebirgsraum. Freiburg im Breisgau 2006. ISBN 978-3-88255-456-4.
