= LB&SCR E3 class =

Class of British steam locomotives

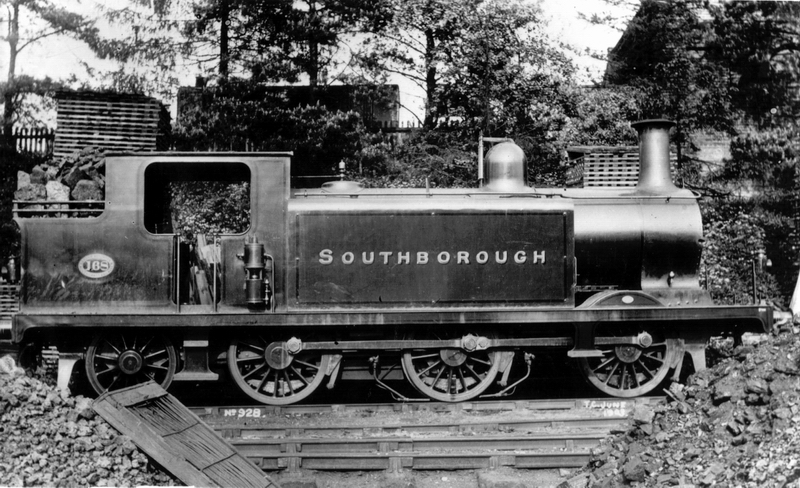
- No. 168 Southborough in 1905, originally classed F.
Type and origin
- Power type: Steam
- Designer: William Stroudley (prototype), later R. J. Billinton
- Builder: Brighton Works
- Build date: 1891 and 1894–1895
- Total produced: 17
Specifications
- Configuration
  - Whyte: 0-6-2T
- Gauge: 4 ft 8 1/2 in (1,435 mm) standard gauge
- Driver dia.: 4 ft 6 in (1.372 m)
- Trailing dia.: 4 ft 0 in (1.219 m)
- Loco weight: 56 long tons 15 cwt (127,100 lb or 57.7 t) (63.6 short tons)
- Fuel type: Coal
- Fuel capacity: 2.5 t (2.5 long tons; 2.8 short tons)
- Water cap.: 1,377 imp gal (6,260 L; 1,654 US gal)
- Boiler pressure: 158: 150 psi (1.03 MPa); 453–462: 160 psi (1.10 MPa); 165–170: 170 psi (11.72 bar; 1.17 MPa)
- Cylinders: Two, inside
- Cylinder size: 18 in × 26 in (457 mm × 660 mm), later 17.5 in × 26 in (444 mm × 660 mm)
Performance figures
- Tractive effort: 453–462: 20,055 lbf (89.2 kN); 165–170: 21,305 lbf (94.8 kN)
Career
- Operators: LBSC, SR, BR
- Class: E3
- Power class: BR: 3F
- Numbers: LBSC: 158, 453–462, 165–170
- Withdrawn: 1934, 1949–1959
- Disposition: All scrapped

The London, Brighton and South Coast Railway E3 class were 0-6-2T side tank steam locomotives. One prototype was designed by William Stroudley shortly before his death, but was completed by R. J. Billinton, who later built sixteen further locomotives.

== Background ==
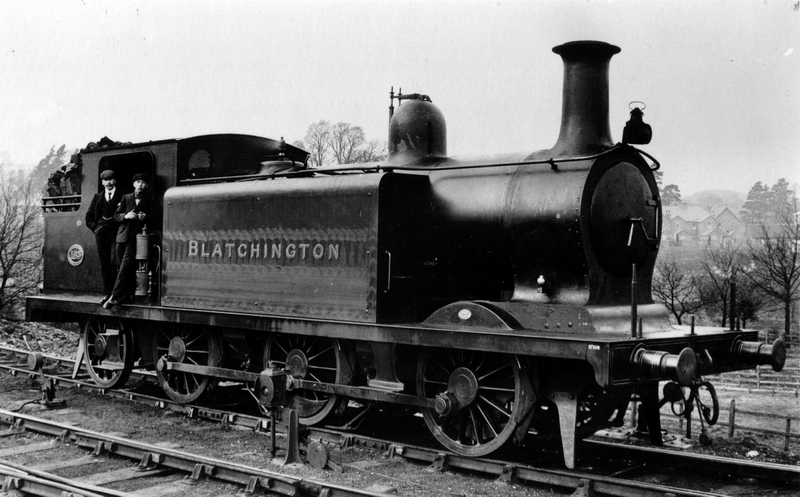
No. 165 Blatchington in 1906.

In the summer of 1889, Stroudley designed a class of 0-6-2 radial tanks to replace his earlier E1 class 0-6-0T for short-distance goods and shunting duties. One locomotive was under construction at the time of his death in the December of that year. Intermittent progress on this locomotive was made until August 1891 when Stroudley's successor, R. J. Billinton ordered that further work be delayed whilst he made detailed modifications. This prototype locomotive, No. 158 West Brighton, appeared in traffic on 27 October 1891. The new locomotive was originally classified as F class.

Once the teething troubles had been rectified, Billinton ordered a further sixteen locomotives to a broadly similar design but with increased boiler pressure. These were originally classified 'E-special' and entered traffic between November 1894 and December 1895. All were rebuilt with new boilers and extended smokeboxes from 1918 and some had increased boiler pressure.

Both classes were later re-classified as 'E3' by D. E. Marsh, but were often referred to as 'Small Radials'. The cylinder diameter was later reduced from 18 to 17.5 inches (457 to 444 mm) by the Southern Railway.

== Use ==
The class was found to be useful on the freight and shunting duties for which they were designed, but the small wheels limited their usefulness on suburban passenger duties. As a result, further construction of radial tanks was of the larger wheeled E4 class (known as 'Large Radials) introduced in 1897.

The prototype No. 158 was withdrawn in 1934, but the remainder of the class entered British Railways service in 1948 and were numbered 32165–32170 and 32453–32462. The final E3 was withdrawn and scrapped in 1959.

== Other sources ==
- Burtt, F. (1903). The locomotives of the London Brighton & South Coast Railway 1839-1903. The Locomotive Publishing Company.
- Ian Allan ABC of British Railways Locomotives, part 2. 1949. pp. 33–34.
