= LB&SCR E1 class =

British steam locomotive class (1874–1961)

London, Brighton and South Coast Railway E1 and E1X Classes
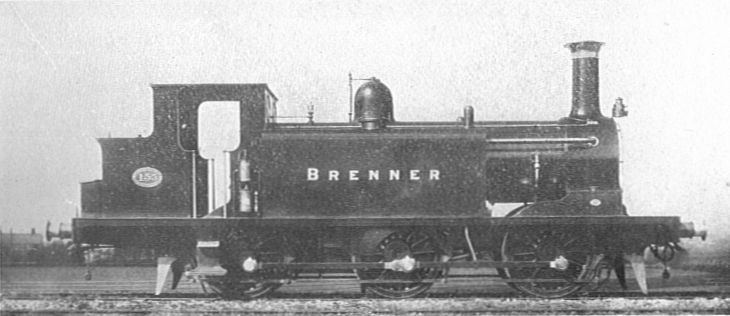
- E1 class, no. 155 Brenner
Type and origin
- Power type: Steam
- Designer: William Stroudley
- Builder: LBSCR Brighton Works
- Build date: 1874–1891
- Total produced: 79
Specifications
- Configuration
  - Whyte: 0-6-0T
  - UIC: C n2t
- Gauge: 4 ft 8 1/2 in (1,435 mm)
- Driver dia.: 4 ft 6 in (1,372 mm)
- Length: 32 ft 4 1/2 in (9.868 m)
- Loco weight: 44.15 long tons (44.9 t)
- Fuel capacity: 1.5 long tons (1.5 t; 1.7 short tons)
- Water cap.: 900 imp gal (4,090 L; 1,080 US gal)
- Firebox
  - Grate area: 16 sq ft (1.5 m^{2})
- Boiler pressure: 160 psi (1.1 MPa)
- Heating surface: 977 sq ft (90.8 m^{2})
- Cylinders: Two, inside
- Cylinder size: 17 in × 24 in (432 mm × 610 mm)
Performance figures
- Tractive effort: 17,470 lbf (77.7 kN)
Career
- Operators: London, Brighton and South Coast Railway, Southern Railway, British Railways
- Class: E1, E1X
- Power class: Isle of Wight: C; BR: 2F
- Withdrawn: 1908–1961
- Preserved: 110 (B110)
- Current owner: Isle of Wight Steam Railway
- Disposition: One preserved, remainder scrapped

The London, Brighton and South Coast Railway E1 Class were 0-6-0T steam locomotives designed by William Stroudley in 1874 for short-distance goods and piloting duties. They were originally classified E, and generally known as "E-tanks"; They were reclassified E1 in the time of D. E. Marsh.

== Construction and use ==
The first six locomotives of this useful and long-lived class were built at Brighton and appeared in traffic between September 1874 and March 1875. They performed well and further orders were placed at intervals, with some being built every year until 1881 when the class consisted of sixty locomotives; twelve more were built in 1883, and after Stroudley's death, a final batch of six was built in 1891 bringing the total to seventy-eight. The class was used throughout the LBSCR system, principally for goods and shunting, but occasionally for secondary passenger duties.

Numbers were 97–156 for those built between 1874 and 1881, 85–96 for those built in 1883, and 159–164 for those built in 1891.

In 1884 Stroudley also built one example of the class (No. 157 Barcelona) with a larger boiler and Gladstone-type cylinders with valves underneath to work on the steeply-graded lines between Eastbourne and Tunbridge Wells. This "E Special" class (later E2 class and finally included in the E1 class) locomotive was withdrawn in 1922. No. 158 West Brighton was not an 0-6-0T but a prototype 0-6-2T, originally classified F but later included in the E3 class.

== Rebuilds and withdrawals ==
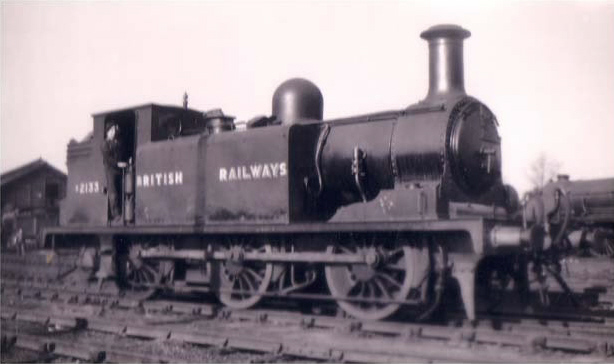
E1 No. 2133 (formerly LB&SCR no. 133 Picardy) in early British Railways livery, before renumbering - circa 1949.

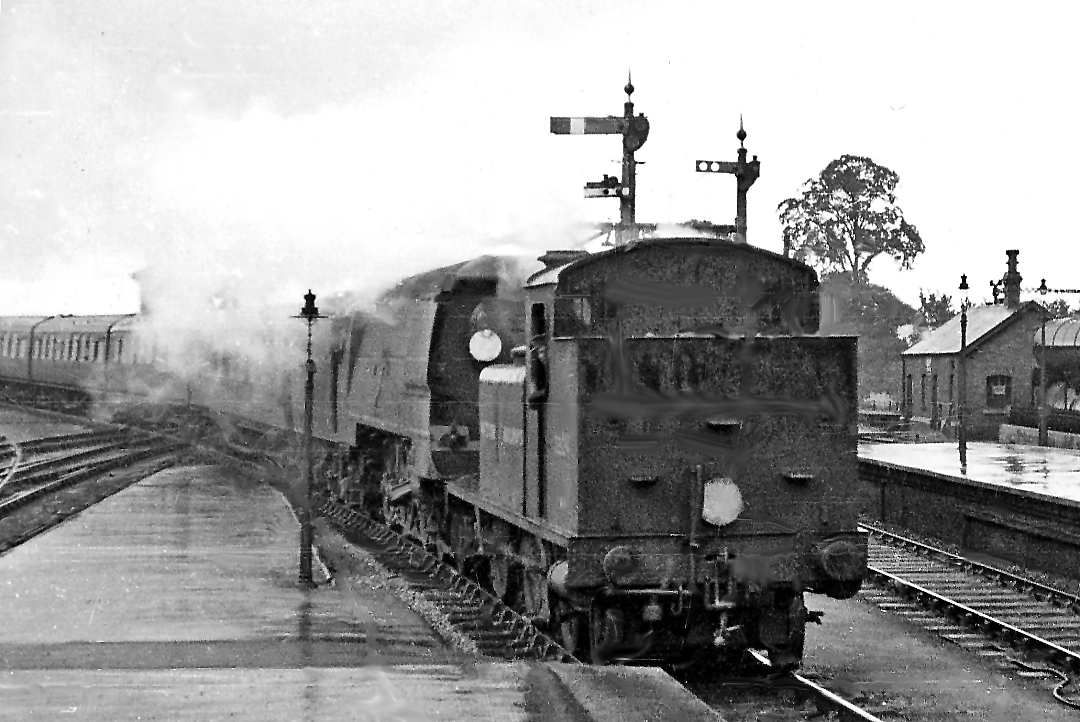
E1/R 0-6-2T No. 32124 piloting a Bulleid Light Pacific at Exeter St David's 16 July 1949

After 1894/95, the class gradually began to be replaced by R. J. Billinton's radial tanks of the E3 and E4 classes. Withdrawals commenced in 1908 when one locomotive was broken up for spares, and others were withdrawn at intervals being replaced by the E2 Class of Lawson Billinton until May 1914, when the increased need for locomotives during the First World War meant that there were no further withdrawals. One locomotive (no. 89) was rebuilt with a larger boiler by D. E. Marsh between January and June 1911 and reclassified E1X; it was renumbered 89A in October 1911, and 689 in December 1912. However this was rebuilt as an E1 in 1930 once the boiler was condemned.

Under Southern Railway ownership, withdrawals continued during the 1920s, with some examples sold to industrial railways rather than scrapped. Eight examples were also rebuilt as 0-6-2 radial tank engines for use in the west of England. These were classified as E1/R.

Four E1s were also transferred for duties on the Isle of Wight: three were shipped from Southampton on 4 July 1932 and a fourth on 16 June 1933. Before transfer, they were overhauled at Eastleigh Works, painted green, renumbered W1-W4 and given names related to the Island.

- 136 (originally Brindisi) became W1 Medina.
- 152 (originally Hungary) became W2 Yarmouth.
- 154 (originally Madrid) became W3 Ryde.
- 131 (originally Gournay) became W4 Wroxall.

Nos. W1–W3 were allocated to Newport, and no. W4 was at Ryde. They were primarily intended for goods traffic, but were used on passenger trains where necessary. At speed they were unsteady, but after No. W4 was successfully rebalanced at Ryde Works in October 1933 the others were modified similarly during 1935–36.

Thirty examples survived the transfer of ownership to British Railways in 1948, but during the 1950s they were gradually replaced by diesel shunters. The last survivor, BR No. 32694, was allocated to Southampton Docks. It was withdrawn in July 1961 and scrapped at Eastleigh Works later that year.

The four on the Isle of Wight worked goods trains until route closures in the 1950s brought a reduction in their duties. When repairs became due, they were withdrawn from service instead of being overhauled: No. W2 was withdrawn in September 1956, No. W1 in March 1957, No. W3 in June 1959 and No. W4 in October 1960.

Because no more members of the O2 class were sent over to the Isle of Wight, the names of the Wight-based E tanks were not transferred over.

== Preservation ==
No. B110 In Southern Railway Livery

One example, No. B110 (originally No. 110 Burgundy) was sold in 1927 to the Cannock and Rugeley Colliery Company. They gave it the number 9 and named it Cannock Wood, and it worked their internal system until 1963.

After withdrawal it was bought for preservation and moved between several sites before restoration began in 1986 and it returned to action at the East Somerset Railway in 1993. It was withdrawn prematurely in 1997 requiring firebox and boiler repairs, and spent many years in pieces awaiting overhaul, although in 2011 it was cosmetically restored into (inauthentic) BR black.

In 2012, B110 was sold to the Isle of Wight Steam Railway, in return for LMS Ivatt Class 2 no. 46447 moving to the ESR. The railway plans to restore the engine and run it as No. W2 Yarmouth, which was an identity previously worn by one of the Isle of Wight-based E1s.
