= Southborough =

Southborough may refer to:

== Communities ==
- Southborough, Bromley, an area of South East London, England
- Southborough, Kent, a suburb of Tunbridge Wells, England
- Southborough, Kingston upon Thames, the southernmost part of Surbiton in South West London, England
- Southborough, Massachusetts, a town in the United States
  - Southborough Center Historic District, located here

== People ==
- Baron Southborough, a former title in UK peerage
  - Francis Hopwood, 1st Baron Southborough (1860–1947), British civil servant and solicitor

== Transportation ==
- Southborough railway station, two former stations in Kent, England
- Southborough station, in the U.S. state of Massachusetts
- SS Southborough, a cargo steamer sunk in 1918
- RNLB Lord Southborough, a British lifeboat named for Francis Hopwood

== Other uses ==
- Southborough Franchise Committee, a British committee in India, 1918–1919
- Southborough High School, a boys secondary school in Surbiton, London
- Southborough Pit, a geological site in Kent, England
