= NBR C Class 673 Maude =

Steam locomotive built in Glasgow in 1891

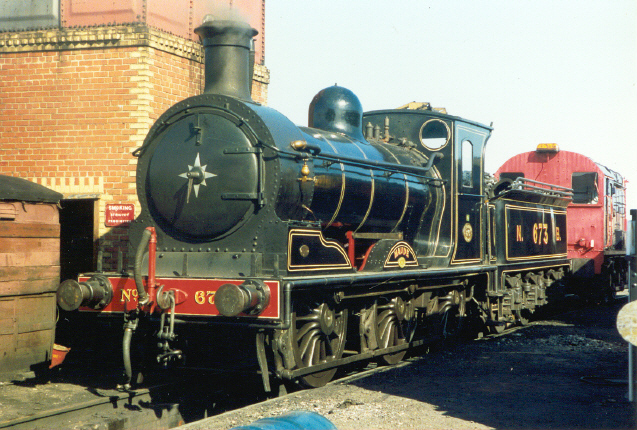
- NBR C Class 673 "Maude" at Bo'ness.
Type and origin
- Power type: Steam
- Builder: Neilson and Company
- Serial number: 4392
- Build date: December 1891
Specifications
- Configuration
  - Whyte: 0-6-0
- Gauge: 4 ft 8 1/2 in (1,435 mm)
- Driver dia.: 5 ft 0 in (1.524 m)
- Length: Unrebuilt: 49 ft 0 1/2 in (14.948 m); Rebuilt: 49 ft 2 in (14.99 m)
- Axle load: 15 long tons 15 cwt (35,300 lb or 16 t)
- Loco weight: 41 long tons 19 cwt (94,000 lb or 42.6 t)
- Tender weight: 33 long tons 9 cwt (74,900 lb or 34 t)
- Fuel type: Coal
- Boiler pressure: 165 lbf/in^{2} (1.14 MPa)
- Cylinders: Two, inside
- Cylinder size: 18 in × 26 in (457 mm × 660 mm)
- Valve gear: Stephenson
Performance figures
- Tractive effort: 19,690 lbf (87.59 kN)
Career
- Operators: North British Railway; London and North Eastern Railway; British Railways
- Power class: BR: 2F
- Numbers: NBR 673; LNER 9673; LNER 5243; BR 65243
- Official name: Maude
- Withdrawn: July 1966
- Disposition: On static display, Awaiting overhaul

North British Railway C Class number 673 Maude is North British Railway C class 0-6-0 tender engine, that was built by Neilson & Co at the Hyde Park Works in Glasgow in 1891.

== The Railway Children ==
Around on April 23, 2000, the ownership of the locomotive was transferred to the Bullied Preservation Society for its future care. As in the original film, The Railway Children a wide range of rolling stock was used. The locomotives seen are NBR C Class No. 673 'Maude', LSWR B4 class No. 96 'Normandy', LB&SCR E4 class No. 473 'Birch Grove', and SECR C Class No. 592 (as the Green Dragon). No. 592 and Maude were painted in fictional liveries for the filming, with No. 592 wearing typical SECR lined green but with GNSR lettering, symbolising the fictional Great Northern and Southern Railway, and Maude in plain black with GNSR lettering. Birch Grove was seen sporting its original LB&SCR lined brown, and Normandy was painted in Southern Railway unlined black. Maude is based on the Bo'ness and Kinneil Railway near Edinburgh whilst the other locomotives remain on the Bluebell Railway.

== Sources ==
- Fry, E.V., ed. (September 1966). Locomotives of the L.N.E.R., part 5: Tender Engines – Classes J1 to J37. Kenilworth: RCTS. ISBN 0-901115-12-6.
