= LSWR G6 class =

Class of 34 two-cylinder 0-6-0T locomotives

LSWR/SR G6
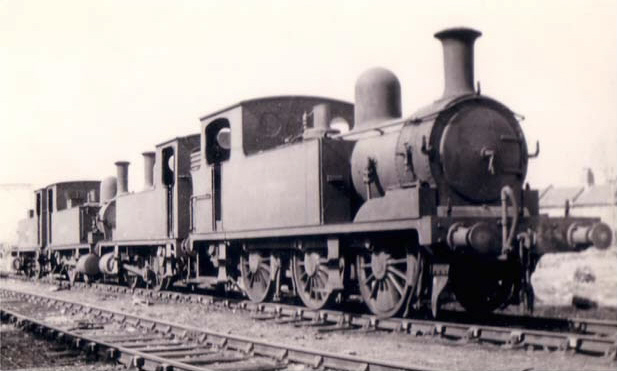
- Adams G6 No. 240 is stored pending scrapping following withdrawal from service at Eastleigh, 1949
Type and origin
- Power type: Steam
- Designer: William Adams
- Builder: LSWR Nine Elms Works
- Build date: 1894–1900
- Total produced: 34
Specifications
- Configuration
  - Whyte: 0-6-0T
- Gauge: 4 ft 8 1/2 in (1,435 mm)
- Driver dia.: 4 ft 10 in (1.473 m)
- Length: 30 ft 8 1/2 in (9.36 m)
- Loco weight: 37.65 long tons (38.3 t)
- Fuel type: Coal
- Fuel capacity: 1.5 long tons (1.5 t); later 3.25 long tons (3.3 t)
- Water cap.: 1,000 imp gal (4,500 L)
- Boiler pressure: 160 lbf/in^{2} (1.10 MPa)
- Cylinders: Two, inside
- Cylinder size: 17 1/2 in × 24 in (444 mm × 610 mm)
Performance figures
- Tractive effort: 17,235 lbf (76.67 kN)
Career
- Operators: London and South Western Railway; Southern Railway; British Railways
- Class: LSWR: G6; SR: G6
- Power class: SR: (none); BR: 2F
- Locale: Southern Region
- Withdrawn: 1948–1962
- Disposition: All scrapped

The LSWR G6 class was an 0-6-0T tank locomotive designed by William Adams for the London and South Western Railway.

== Background ==
The late nineteenth century was a troubled period for the LSWR due to frequent motive power shortages brought about by employing a collection of ageing locomotives in an era of increasing rail traffic. There was a need to supplement this fleet with a new class of locomotive design that could undertake the mundane task of shunting in goods yards around the LSWR network.

In 1893, the LSWR tasked their Locomotive Superintendent, William Adams, to solve this requirement for additional motive power. A new class of yard shunters was required to supplement the railway's current stock of 0-6-0Ts, which dated from 1881 and had been constructed by Beyer, Peacock and Company. Therefore, a need for a compact freight design was highlighted, with the G6 being the resultant locomotive class.

== Construction history ==
The new design was designated the Class G6 by Adams, who intended the class to be an 0-6-0 version of his O2 class passenger locomotives. The wheel arrangement was ideal for the tight curves and traction needed in shunting activities, with the shorter wheelbase helping to solve both these concerns. The G6 represented the only 0-6-0 design undertaken by Adams, with the resultant locomotive being a highly compact design. Construction of the class began in 1893, and was undertaken in-house by the LSWR at Nine Elms works in London, with an initial batch of ten locomotives being constructed. The boiler also betrayed the pairing with the O2 Class because it was the same for standardisation purposes.

Four further locomotives were constructed in 1896 as replacements for the B4 class 0-4-0T dock shunters at Southampton Docks due to their increased coal and water capacity and enhanced power. This proved to be one of Adams's last deeds on the LSWR, as he retired to be replaced by Dugald Drummond.

Drummond authorised a further batch of ten locomotives during the period 1897 to 1898 after being impressed with the performance of the class. A further, and final, batch of ten was ordered in 1900. However, both of these batches differed from the original ten because they utilised the boilers of Beattie Well tanks and other withdrawn locomotives. Very few modifications were undertaken during their working careers, with only the Adams stovepipe chimney being replaced by a Drummond lipped example, whilst vacuum brakes were also eventually implemented.

Order	Year	Quantity	LSWR numbers	Notes
G6	1894	10	257–266	
C7	1896	4	267–270	
X7	1897	5	271–275	
D9	1898	5	237–240, 279	
M9	1900	5	160, 162, 276–278	
R9	1900	5	348, 349, 351, 353, 354	

== Livery and numbering ==
=== LSWR and Southern ===
Under LSWR ownership, the G6s were outshopped in the LSWR dark Holly Green livery, with black and light green lining, which was applied to most freight designs of the LSWR. Gilt lettering and numbering was located on the water tank sides and cabside respectively, with the letters 'LSW.'

=== Post-1948 (nationalisation) ===
The class as inherited by British Railways retained the Southern livery for a short period. As overhauls took place, the class began to be turned out in unlined BR Freight Black livery. However, only ten locomotives were to see this livery, as several members were withdrawn from service and scrapped. The BR crest was placed upon the water tank sides, with the number cabside.

Due to the confusing nature of the original LSWR and subsequent SR numbering systems, the class was spread across several numbering bands in the BR 30xxx series. BR inherited 32 locomotives: 30160, 30162, 30257 to 30279, and 30348, 30349. However, after the mass withdrawal of 1951, only 30160, 30162, 30237, 30258, 30260, 30266, 30270, 30274, 30279 and 30349 remained to receive the new livery.

== Operational details ==
The G6 Class was a highly localised, though useful, locomotive design that very rarely ventured off the LSWR network, even in service with the Southern Railway. The only exception was the transfer of a single example to Reading freight yard in 1941 to assist with the GWR's shortage of motive power during the Second World War. As the war progressed, a second member of the class was also transferred here and provided sterling service.

The class was highly successful in undertaking the tasks they were designed for, and were respected by their crews. They rarely undertook passenger work, though they did undertake banking duties between Exeter St Davids and Exeter Central on occasion, until Stroudley E1/R 0-6-2Ts took on this task in 1933.

After Nationalisation, two members of the class eventually found their way into departmental service, both being allocated to Meldon Quarry in Devon. The first to undertake this role was number 30272 in June 1950, being renumbered DS3152. When this example was withdrawn in 1960, 30238 replaced DS3152 under the new number of DS682.

== Withdrawal ==
The first withdrawal was number 348 in August 1948, followed by a larger number of 22 by the end of 1951. The final survivor was a 64-year-old example, number 30238, though this locomotive was one of the last to be withdrawn as part of the Modernisation Plan in late 1962. None of these useful locomotives have survived into preservation.

Table of withdrawals
Year	Quantity in service at start of year	Quantity withdrawn	Locomotive numbers	Notes
1948	34	6	239/261/271/278–279/348	
1949	28	14	30237/40/57/62–65/67/69/73/75–76, 30351/54	
1950	14	3	30259/68/72	30272 to service stock as DS3152
1951	11	1	30353	
1958	10	2	30162, 30260	
1959	8	2	30160, 30270	
1960	6	3	30238/66/72	DS3152 withdrawn; replaced by 238 renumbered DS682
1961	3	3	30258/77, 30349	
1962	0	0	–	DS682 withdrawn
