= LSWR 415 class =

British steam locomotive class (1882–1961)

LSWR/SR 415 class
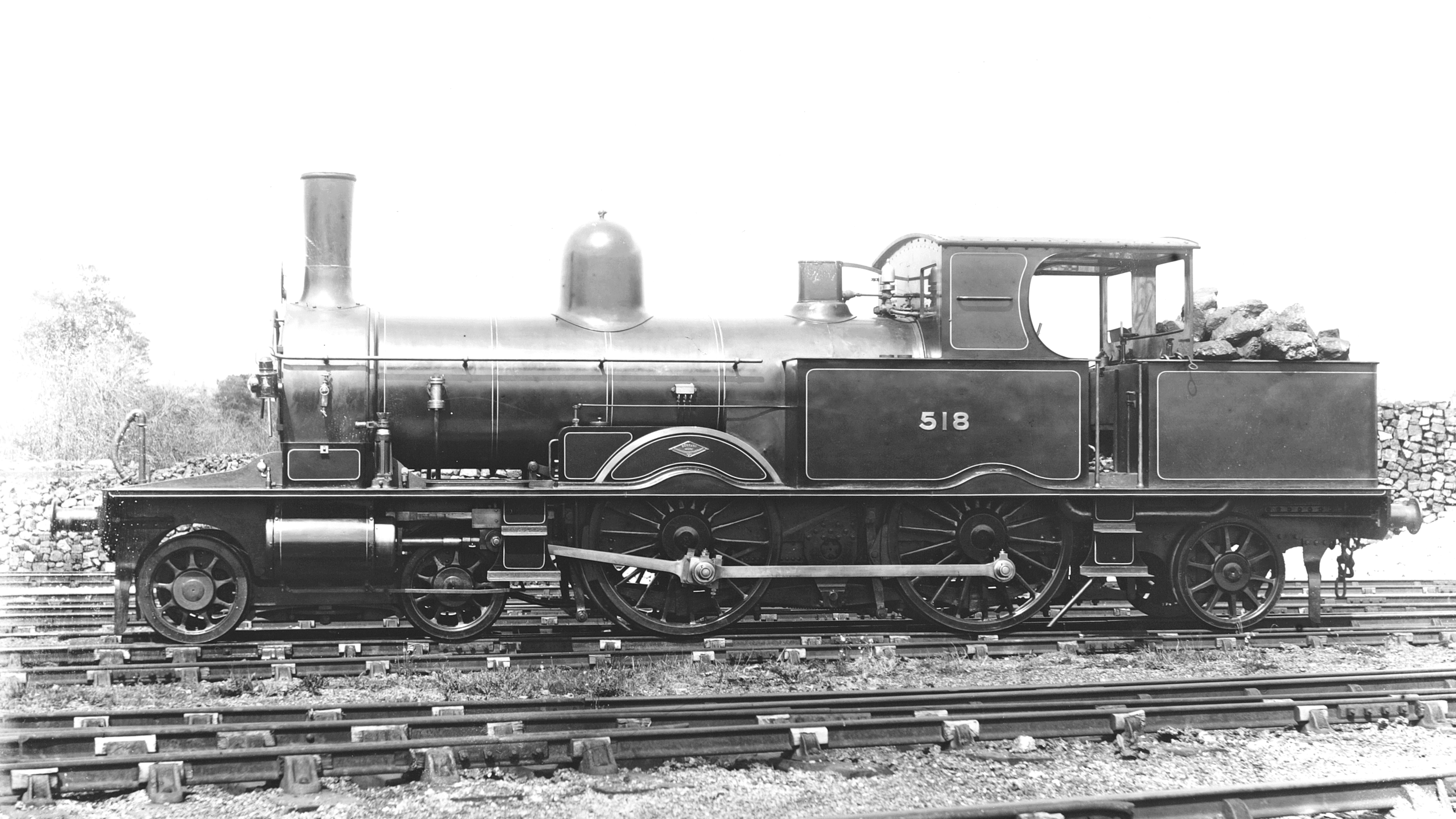
- 415 class No. 518
Type and origin
- Power type: Steam
- Designer: William Adams
- Builder: Robert Stephenson & Co. (28); Dübs & Co. (20); Neilson & Co. (11); Beyer Peacock (12)
- Serial number: RS 2501–2518, 2601–2610; Dübs 2000–2009, 2105–2114; Neilson 3200–3210; BP 2167–2178
- Build date: 1882–1885
- Total produced: 71
Specifications
- Configuration
  - Whyte: 4-4-2T
- Gauge: 4 ft 8 1/2 in (1,435 mm)
- Leading dia.: 3 ft 1 in (0.940 m)
- Driver dia.: 5 ft 7 in (1.702 m)
- Length: 36 ft 5 1/2 in (11.11 m)
- Loco weight: 55 tons 2 cwt (124,200 lb or 56.3 t)
- Fuel type: Coal
- Fuel capacity: 1 long ton (1.02 t; 1.12 short tons)
- Water cap.: 1,200 imp gal (5,500 L; 1,400 US gal)
- Boiler pressure: 160 psi (1.10 MPa)
- Cylinders: Two, outside
- Cylinder size: 17.5 in × 24 in (444 mm × 610 mm)
Performance figures
- Tractive effort: 14,919 lbf (66.36 kN)
Career
- Operators: London and South Western Railway, Southern Railway, British Railways
- Class: 415, later 0415
- Power class: LSWR / SR: K, BR: 1P
- Nicknames: Radial Tank
- Locale: Great Britain
- Withdrawn: 1916–1928, 1961
- Preserved: No. 488
- Disposition: One preserved, remainder scrapped

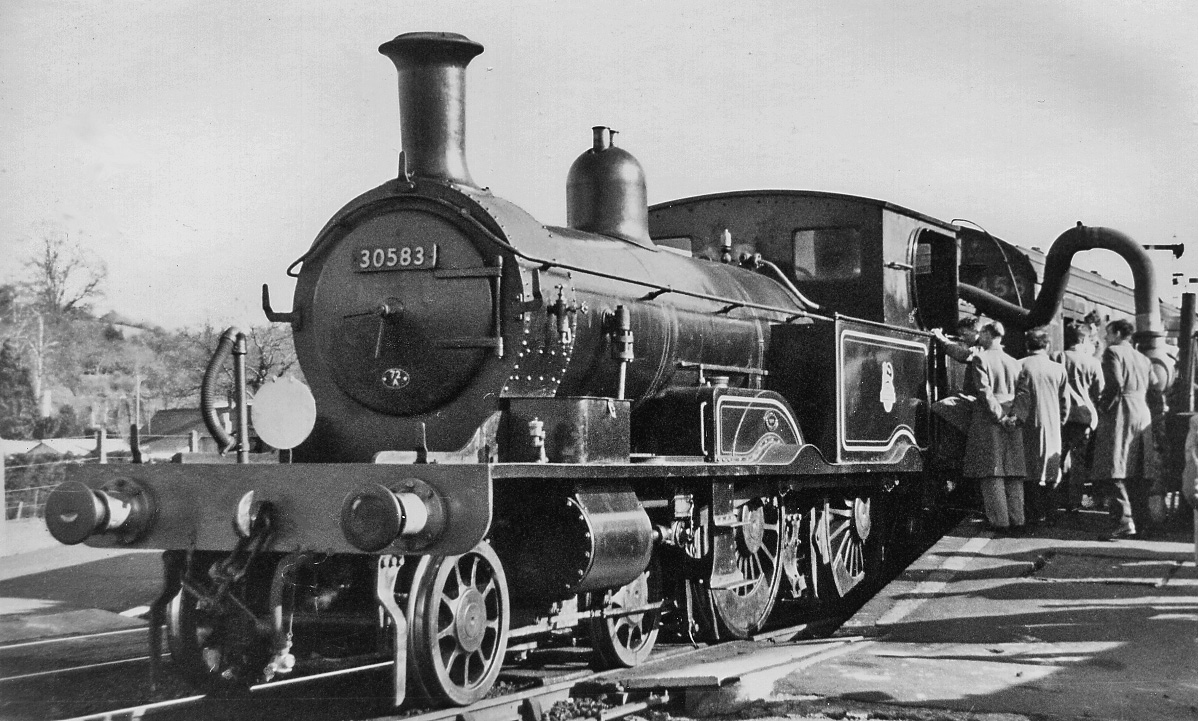
415 class No. 30583 at Tipton St Johns in 1953, while on a railtour.

The LSWR 415 class is a 4-4-2T steam tank locomotive, with the trailing wheels forming the basis of its "Radial Tank" moniker. It was designed by William Adams and introduced in 1882 for service on the London and South Western Railway (LSWR).

Originally rostered for suburban traffic, the class was soon displaced to the countryside by Dugald Drummond's M7 class. Most of the class was scrapped around the end of the First World War, and further decreases meant that all of them were due to be withdrawn by 1929. However, the class was noted for its long service on the Lyme Regis branch line, and three members of this long obsolete class were utilised on this duty until 1962, when suitable replacements became available. One has survived and can be found on the Bluebell Railway.

== Background ==
This class, designed by William Adams, was the result of the work made to replace the stop-gap 46 Class on suburban services around London. In the event, they were also intended to supplement this class while members entered the works for rebuilding into "Radial Tank" configuration. All were built from 1882, and were also intended for medium to heavy suburban passenger traffic around the South Coast on the LSWR railway network.

== Construction history ==
William Adams' 415 (later 0415) class was based on his earlier 46 class, and was specifically designed with London suburban services in mind. The design was based on a 4-4-0 design with a trailing axle added to support an enlarged coal bunker, a necessity for the intensive suburban services of the LSWR network. The radial axlebox worked in a corresponding curved hornblock the centre of which was struck near the middle of the chassis. The device was originally invented in 1863 by William Bridges Adams (no relation) and could be applied to a leading or trailing axle but was generally preferred for the latter. Many other engineers used it, including Francis Webb, R. J. Billinton, Henry Ivatt, and D. E. Marsh. Many of the tank engines so fitted earned the soubriquet "Radial Tanks", or simply "Radials". The enlarged coal bunker was also designed to incorporate a back tank for extra water storage in addition to the capacity of the side tanks. Valve gear was of modified Stephenson type.

Production began in 1882 when a total of four engineering companies were contracted by the LSWR to construct the new class, which numbered 71 when production ceased in 1885. These were: Robert Stephenson & Co. (28 constructed); Dübs & Co. (20 constructed); Neilson & Co. (11 constructed) and finally Beyer, Peacock and Company (12 constructed). This arrangement was because Nine Elms, the LSWR's own locomotive works, was already stretched to capacity in terms of production.

| Year | Builder serial number | Quantity | LSWR numbers | Notes |
|---|---|---|---|---|
| 1882 | Beyer, Peacock & Co. 2167–2178 | 12 | 415–426 | |
| 1883 | Robert Stephenson & Co. 2501–2518 | 18 | 427–432, 45, 47–57 | |
| 1884 | Dübs & Co. 2000–2009 | 10 | 169–171, 173, 490–495 | |
| 1885 | Neilson & Co. 3200–3210 | 11 | 479–489 | |
| 1885 | Robert Stephenson & Co. 2601–2610 | 10 | 68, 77–78, 82, 104, 106–107, 125–126, 129 | 68, 77–78 renumbered 58–60 in 1889–90 |
| 1885 | Dübs & Co. 2105–2114 | 10 | 516–525 | |

Although all were constructed to the same basic design, the locomotives that were outshopped from 1884 had slightly larger side water tanks and deeper fireboxes, therefore increasing efficiency. All carried the trademark Adams stove pipe chimney throughout his tenure as Locomotive Superintendent of the LSWR. In order to facilitate the speedy overhaul of these locomotives in the confined spaces of Nine Elms, spare boilers were constructed. Coupled to a short wheelbase and guiding bogies, the locomotive was relatively manoeuvrable on tight curves, a feature that was to ensure the survival of some of the class later on.

Upon the appointment of Dugald Drummond as Superintendent of the LSWR after Adams' departure, the class was modified slightly, with the application of his lipped chimney in place of the stovepipe version that the locomotives were equipped with when built. This also coincided with the addition of coal rails to the bunker in an attempt to increase capacity. Because the class was not considered to have a long working life under Robert Urie, they were not equipped with superheating.

== Operational details and preservation ==
Despite being well received in service by locomotive crews, the 0415's tenure on the London suburban services was relatively short-lived. This was especially true with the introduction of the Adams T1 class of 0-4-4 tanks displacing some of the class from the London area. However, it was not until the introduction of Drummond's M7 class 0-4-4 tanks and electrification of the suburban railway network that the class was generally removed from the London section of the LSWR to rural branch duties from 1895.

Despite this, in 1903 the inextricable link was made between the class and the severely curved Lyme Regis branch. Unsuccessful trials were carried out with the Stroudley Terriers and the Adams O2 class; however with the trailing axle modified the flexible 0415 class tanks proved to be highly suited to the operating conditions of that line. As a result, two were allocated to Exmouth Junction shed for the Axminster to Lyme Regis service, joined in 1946 by a third example retrieved from the East Kent Railway.

=== War service and Colonel Holman F. Stephens ===
The class also saw service during World War I, which effectively extended their working lives until the mass withdrawal of 38 engines in 1921. Many of the class became surplus to requirements during the later years of the war. Several of the class were utilised in Scotland where the Highland Railway was experiencing a locomotive shortage. In September 1917 number 0488 was sold to the Ministry of Munitions, and then worked at Ridham Dock near Sittingbourne either as a rather unsuitable dock shunter or more likely on staff trains. It was purchased from the Ministry of Munitions Disposal and Liquidation Commission in March 1923 for £375 by Colonel Holman F. Stephens, for use on the East Kent Light Railway – a system serving the coalfield of East Kent – and was delivered to Shepherdswell on 13 April 1923.

As a purely passenger engine, the new arrival was unsuited to the East Kent Light Railway's primarily-industrial needs; it was only used when absolutely necessary, and then largely on coal trains, taking 14 wagons on the Tilmanstone shuttle. Latterly it seems to have worked only about once a month, and was last used on 29 May 1943.

=== Southern Railway ownership ===
Early withdrawals left only 30 locomotives in Southern Railway stock in 1923. The continued electrification and subsequent intensification of timetables meant that the last two members of the class still in service, numbers 0125 and 0520, were retired in 1929. The intent was to replace the class on the Lyme Regis branch with two ex-LB&SCR D1 class tanks, though these proved highly unsatisfactory. This led to the recommission and rebuilding of Nos. 0125 and 0520 at Eastleigh Works, where they were outshopped as 3125 and 3520.

In 1946, the Southern Railway needed a third 'Radial' tank for the Lyme Regis branch to cover locomotive unavailability, and found 0488 (East Kent Light Railway No. 5) out of use but intact, and purchased it in March 1946 for £120. It was extensively overhauled for SR service at Eastleigh, where it received the updated number 3488.

=== British Railways operation and preservation ===
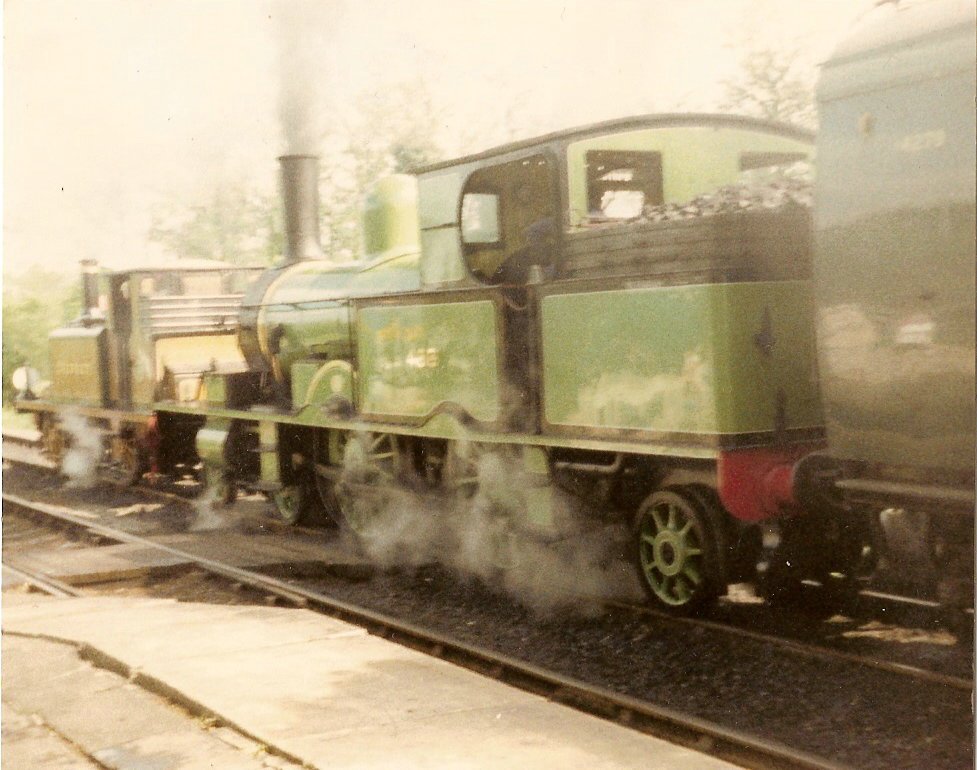
A1 Class "Terrier" Stepney and William Adams LSWR 415 Class "Radial tank" double head a train on the Bluebell Railway

These three locomotives continued on the Lyme Regis branch after Nationalisation due to the lack of better motive power to cope with the curve restrictions in place on the line. By 1958 all three were showing their age, and the end finally came in 1961. Modifications were undertaken on the trackwork to enable Ivatt 2-6-2 tanks to be passed for use on the line. This resulted in numbers 30582 (née 125) and 30584 (née 520) being withdrawn and scrapped. Steam on the branch was however short lived after the demise of the 0415 class, and the Ivatt tanks were soon replaced by diesel railcars. The branch was closed under the Beeching cuts in 1965. No. 30582 was the subject of a preservation attempt by the Kent & East Sussex Railway.

However the final example, 30583 (née 488), was purchased by the Bluebell Railway, chosen because of the three it was the only one retaining the original pattern of boiler. After arriving at the line under its own steam, it proved a capable machine, and was painted in two different LSWR and BR liveries, up until 1990. At present it is a static exhibit, as extensive overhaul (likely by replacing the boiler barrel) is required before it can steam again.

== Accidents and incidents ==
- On 6 August 1888, locomotive No. 484 was working light engine when it was in a head-on collision with a passenger train hauled by locomotive No. 486 at Hampton Wick station, Middlesex due to a signalman's error. Four people were killed and fifteen were injured.

== Livery and numbering ==
=== LSWR and Southern Railway ===
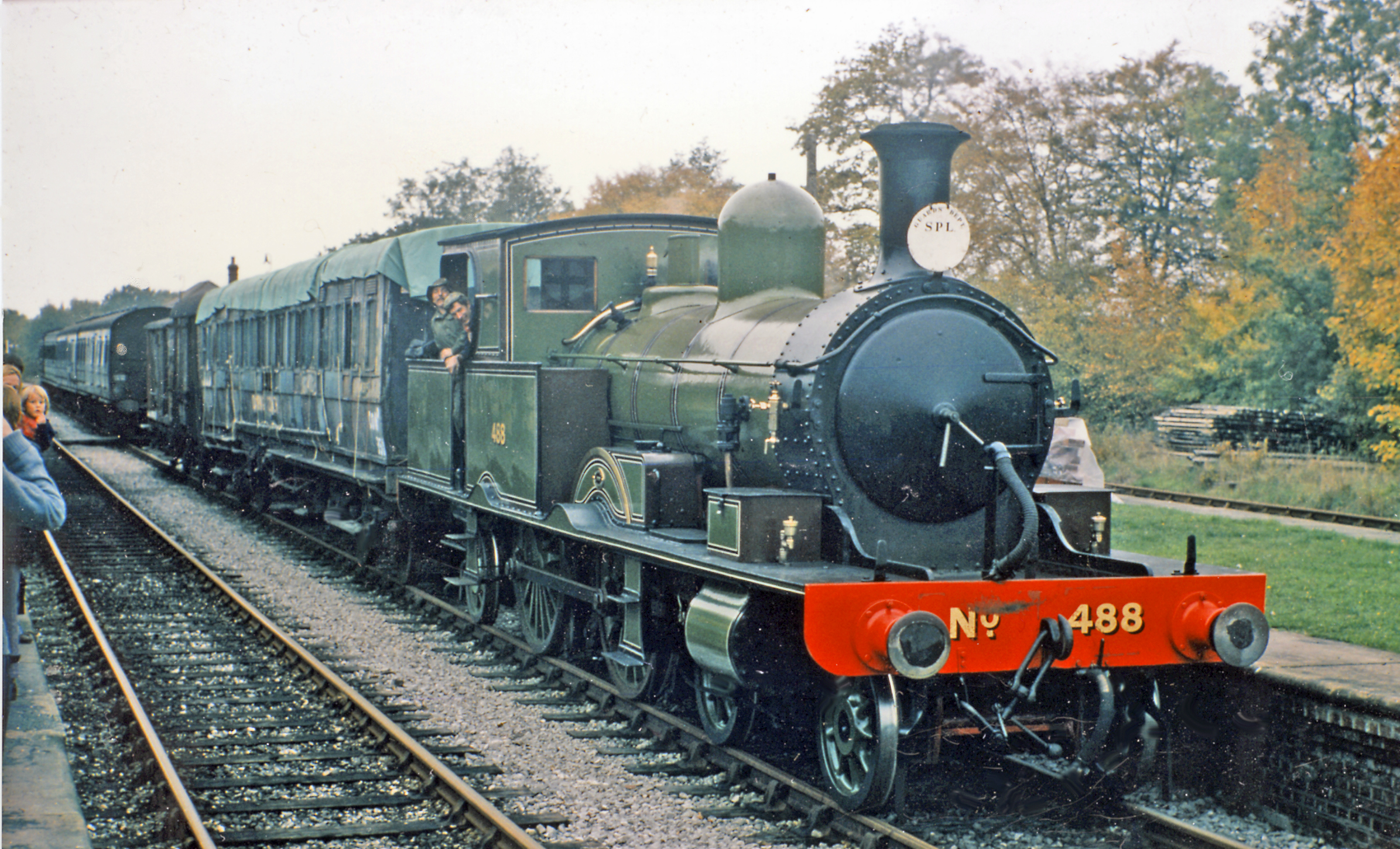
No. 488 at Sheffield Park on the Bluebell Railway 25 October 1975.

Initially outshopped in early LSWR passenger Yellow Ochre/Brown livery with the initials 'LSW' on the water tank sides. This was eventually superseded by the later LSWR Passenger Sage Green livery, with black edging and black and white lining. Numbering was in gilt, as was the 'LSWR' lettering on the water tank side.

Numbering under the LSWR depended on batch, which therefore led to a confusing system of numbers that were granted to locomotives as they were outshopped. Beyer-Peacock constructed the first batch, which was allocated the series 415–432. Stephenson constructed several batches including the series 45–57, 68, 82, 77 and 78, with the final examples being 104, 106, 107, 125, 126 and 129. Dubs produced numbers 169–173, 490–495 and finally 516–525. Neilson produced the batch 479–489.

A duplicate number was granted to class members between 1903 and 1924, so that after grouping in 1923, the Southern Railway inherited locomotives with a '0' prefix to the LSWR numbers. The final three class members that survived the mass withdrawal of 1929 were renumbered 3488, 3125 and 3520 after overhaul.

Livery under the Southern was Richard Maunsell's darker version of the LSWR Sage Green livery, with yellow numbering and lettering on the water tank sides and coal bunker. This livery also featured black and white lining.

=== Post-1948 (nationalisation) ===
The class was given the Power Classification of 1P, and initially carried the Southern livery, though this was promptly changed to the BR Standard Mixed-Traffic Black livery with red and white lining. Numbering was of the BR standard system, the three locomotives being allocated the numbers 30582, 30583 and 30584.

Table of withdrawals
| Year | Quantity in service at start of year | Quantity withdrawn | Locomotive numbers | Notes |
|---|---|---|---|---|
| 1916 | 71 | 1 | 0424 | |
| 1917 | 70 | 1 | 0488 | sold Ministry of Munitions; to East Kent Light Railway 5 |
| 1918 | 69 | 2 | 0479, 0489 | |
| 1921 | 67 | 37 | 047–049, 051–053, 056–57, 060, 082, 0104, 0107, 0171, 0173, 0415, 0417–21, 0423, 0425, 0427, 0430, 0432, 0482, 0484, 0491–95, 0516–18, 0523, 0525 | |
| 1923 | 30 | 1 | 0106 | |
| 1924 | 29 | 8 | E045, E055, E0126, E0129, E0426, E0481, E0485, E0487 | |
| 1925 | 21 | 12 | E058–59, E0416, E0422, E0428–29, E0431, E0480, E0483, E0517, E0521, E0524 | |
| 1926 | 9 | 4 | E0169, E0490, E0519, E0522 | |
| 1927 | 5 | 2 | E050, E054 | |
| 1928 | 3 | 1 | E0486 | |
| 1946 | 2 | -1 | — | EKLR 5 repurchased as SR 3488 |
| 1961 | 3 | 3 | 30582–84 | ex-3125, 3488, 3520 |
