= William Bridges Adams =

British engineer and writer (1797–1872)

- Born: 1797; Woore, Shropshire, England
- Died: 23 July 1872 (aged 74–75); Cuthbert House, Broadstairs, Kent, England
- Occupation: railway engineering
- Known for: Adams axle and railway fishplate inventions

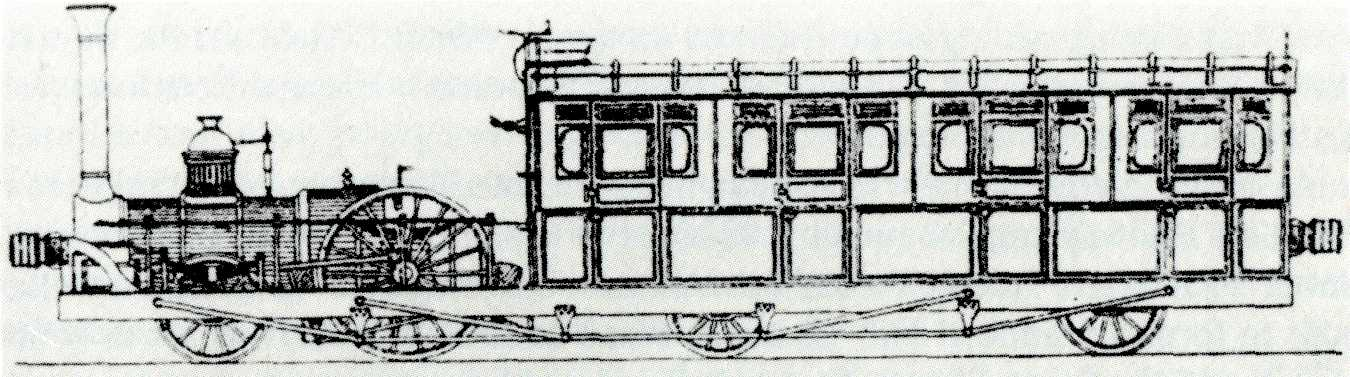
Steam railmotor Enfield built at the Fairfield Locomotive Works in 1849. Used on the Enfield branch of the ECR, but also employed on occasions as a locomotive on the main line – note the raised buffers for use with other rolling stock.

William Bridges Adams (1797 – 23 July 1872) was an English locomotive engineer, and writer. He is best known for his patented Adams axle – a successful radial axle design in use on railways in Britain until the end of steam traction in 1968 – and the railway fishplate. His writings, including English Pleasure Carriages (1837) and Roads and Rails (1862) covered all forms of land transport. Later he became a noted writer on political reform, under the pen name Junius Redivivus (Junius reborn); a reference to a political letter writer of the previous century.

== Personal life ==
He was born and grew up in Woore, Shropshire, close to Madeley, Staffordshire, and was educated at the Madeley School. His father, the son of a yeoman farmer of Woore, moved to London where he worked his way from a journeyman coachbuilder to master tradesman. His principal business was that of supplying leather to coachmakers from a shop in Dean Street, Soho. In due course Adams was apprenticed as a coachbuilder to the firm of Baxter & Pierce of Long Acre, London. This was a well known firm and during his time with the company Napoleon's travelling carriage was brought there, after the battle of Waterloo, and Bridges Adams made a drawing of it.

On 30 November 1818 at St Martin-in-the-Fields, he married Elizabeth Place, the daughter of Francis Place, the social reformer. Together they set out on a voyage to find their fortunes in a warmer climate. In 1820 they left for Valparaíso in Chile. In Valparaíso, he was employed to manage Lord Cochrane's estate, for a salary of £200 per year. In 1821 he had a son, William Alexander Adams (de), later to become a mechanical engineer in his own right. The family survived the earthquake in Valparaíso of 19 November 1822. Elizabeth died on 8 August 1823, when giving birth to a second child, who also died. Following this tragedy Bridges Adams returned to England, with his son, by a long trek over the Andes to Buenos Aires and by ship back to London, via Falmouth, in 1826. After a further trip to the United States, Bridges Adams settled in London and took a position in the firm of Hobson & Co, Coachmakers.

=== Marriages ===
Adams was married three times. His first wife was Elizabeth Place. He married Sarah Fuller Flower Adams in 1834 and they resided at the now demolished Sunnybank, Woodbury Hill, in Loughton, where there is a blue plaque to the couple jointly. After Sarah's death in 1848, he remarried to Ellen Kendall, with whom he had one daughter, Hope Bridges Adams.

=== Later life ===
Adams died at Cuthbert House, Broadstairs, Kent, aged seventy-five, and was buried at St Peter's Church in the town.

== Railway engineering ==
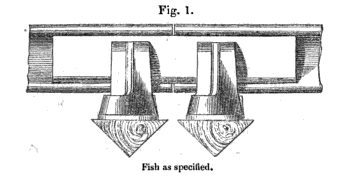
Adams's fishplate

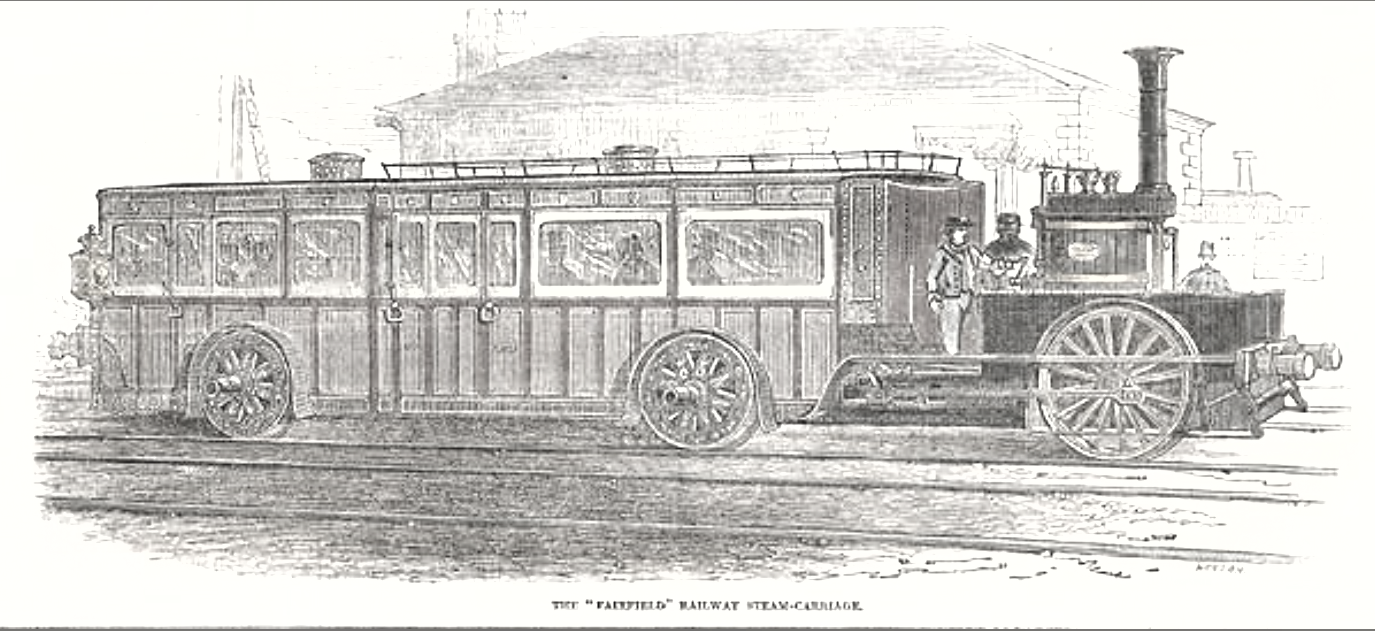
Fairfield Steam railcar, 1848

Dissatisfied with the scarf joints then in use for joining iron track, Adams patented a railway fishplate, in the form of an unbolted wedge between adjoining chairs, in collaboration with Robert Richardson, a junior engineer under Peter Bruff on the Eastern Counties Railway. The two men patented the invention in 1847. Although the design was successful, with sales to the Eastern Counties Railway among others, financial difficulties forced Adams to relinquish the patent. This "wedge" version was soon overtaken by an improved, bolted design by James Samuel of the Eastern Counties Railway. Adams had patented improved springs for road carriages, which he called "bow springs". These could also be used on railway carriages, and the manufacture proved profitable. The manufacture was based in the Currier Factory in Drury Lane and Parker Street, Soho. The business was carried out in the name of Samuel Adams, Bridges Adams's uncle. In 1842 the factory moved from its small premises to three acres of land adjoining the Eastern Counties Railway at Fair Field, Bow. The company now traded as Adams & Co. He founded the Fairfield Locomotive Works (51°31′52″N 0°01′19″W) in Bow, East London, in 1843, where he specialized in light engines, steam railcars (or railmotors) and inspection trolleys. These were sold in small numbers to railways all over Britain and Ireland, including the Fairfield steam carriage for the broad gauge Bristol and Exeter Railway and the Enfield for his most important customer, the Eastern Counties Railway, with its headquarters at nearby Stratford. He supplied a 2-2-0 well tank to the Roman Railway. The company was adjudged bankrupt on 10 August 1850.

James Cross and Company of Lancashire adopted Adams's innovative radial axle box and spring-tyred driving wheels (elastic steel hoops separating the wheel felloes—rim segments—and the outer tyre) for White Raven, a 2-4-2 tank locomotive made for the St Helens Railway in 1863. The unconventional arrangement was initially deemed a success on the tight curves of the St Helens line, but after two years it was decided that the combination allowed too much oscillation and was replaced.

Although Adams's inventions and writings became well-known, the locomotives he produced made little impact. The engineering business failed some years later, although by this time Adams had expanded his interests to include clothing design and journalism.

== Confusion with William Adams ==
Confusingly, one of the first railway companies to use his axle-box design widely was the London and South Western Railway where the Locomotive Superintendent, the creator of the Adams Bogie, was also named William Adams. By further coincidence he too had formerly operated a locomotive works in Bow, but this was not a private concern but the depot of the North London Railway. In 1865 the Society of Engineers, London, made direct comparison between the bogie with the india-rubber lateral bearing of William Adams and the radial axle box of William Bridges Adams: during trials on the North London Railway the laterally sprung bogie was thought superior to the radial axle, but when William Adams moved to the LSWR he adopted the axle box designed by his rival Bridges Adams. The locomotives now known as Adams Radials are named after the Locomotive Superintendent, but they are famous for the axle invented by William Bridges Adams.
