= SR E1/R class =

Southern Railway class E1/R
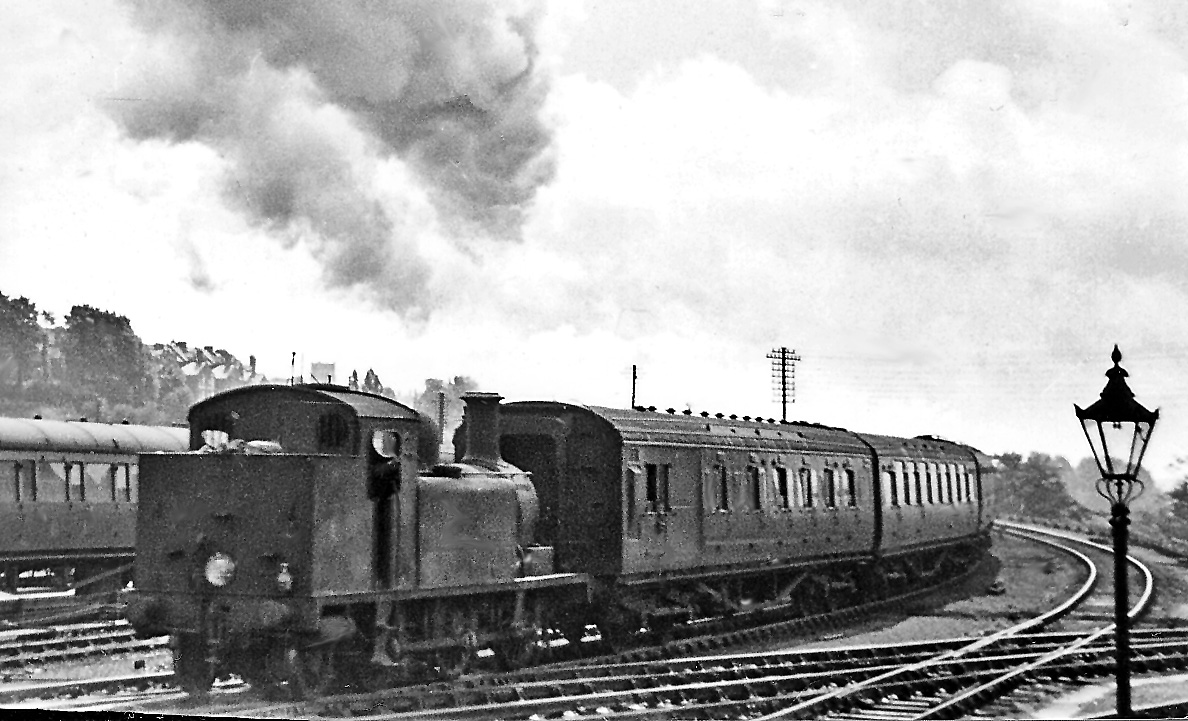
- E1/R no. 32135 banking a train up the half-mile of 1-in-36 from Exeter St Davids to Exeter Central.
Type and origin
- Power type: Steam
- Designer: Maunsell rebuilds of Stroudley locomotives
- Builder: Brighton Works
- Rebuilder: Brighton Works
- Rebuild date: 1927–1929
- Number rebuilt: 10
Specifications
- Configuration
  - Whyte: 0-6-2T
- Gauge: 4 ft 8 1/2 in (1,435 mm) standard gauge
- Driver dia.: 4 ft 6 in (1,371.60 mm)
- Trailing dia.: 3 ft 1 in (939.80 mm)
- Wheelbase: 20 ft 9 in (6.32 m)
- Length: 32 ft 4 1/2 in (9.87 m)
- Loco weight: 50.25 long tons (51.06 t; 56.28 short tons)
- Water cap.: 900 imp gal (4,100 L; 1,100 US gal)
- Boiler pressure: 170 lbf/in^{2} (11.72 bar; 1.17 MPa)
- Cylinders: Two, inside
- Cylinder size: 17 in × 24 in (432 mm × 610 mm)
Performance figures
- Tractive effort: 18,560 lbf (82.56 kN)
Career
- Operators: Southern Railway; British Railways
- Power class: 2MT, 1P2F after 1953
- Locale: Southern Region
- First run: May 1927
- Withdrawn: 1955–1959
- Disposition: All scrapped

The Southern Railway E1/R was a class of 0-6-2T tank steam locomotive designed for light passenger and freight duties. They were rebuilt from earlier LB&SCR E1 class 0-6-0T locomotives originally built 1874–1883. The rebuilt locomotives were intended to be used in the West of England.

== Construction ==
In 1927, there was a surplus of the Stroudley ‘E’ tanks in service on the Central Section of the Southern Railway, many of which were in good condition as they had been fitted with larger boilers by D. E. Marsh after 1911. At the same time there was a need for additional tank locomotives in the Western Section for shunting, station piloting and particularly for services on the North Cornwall line to Padstow.

Ten locomotives had their frames extended, bunkers and water tanks enlarged at Brighton works over the next two years. A pony truck of the same design as a N class locomotive was also added to create a radial trailing axle, making them 0-6-2T. The rebuilt locomotives were dispatched to the Western section during 1928 and 1929 and found to be successful. Some complaints from passengers about rough riding on the curving North Cornwall line were addressed by rebalancing the locomotives on this line in 1936, while unmodified locomotives were restricted to local shunting and banking duties.

The new class performed well for nearly twenty years until withdrawals began in 1955, and they were all replaced by Ivatt Class 2 2-6-2Ts by 1959.
