= Adams axle =

Rail locomotive component

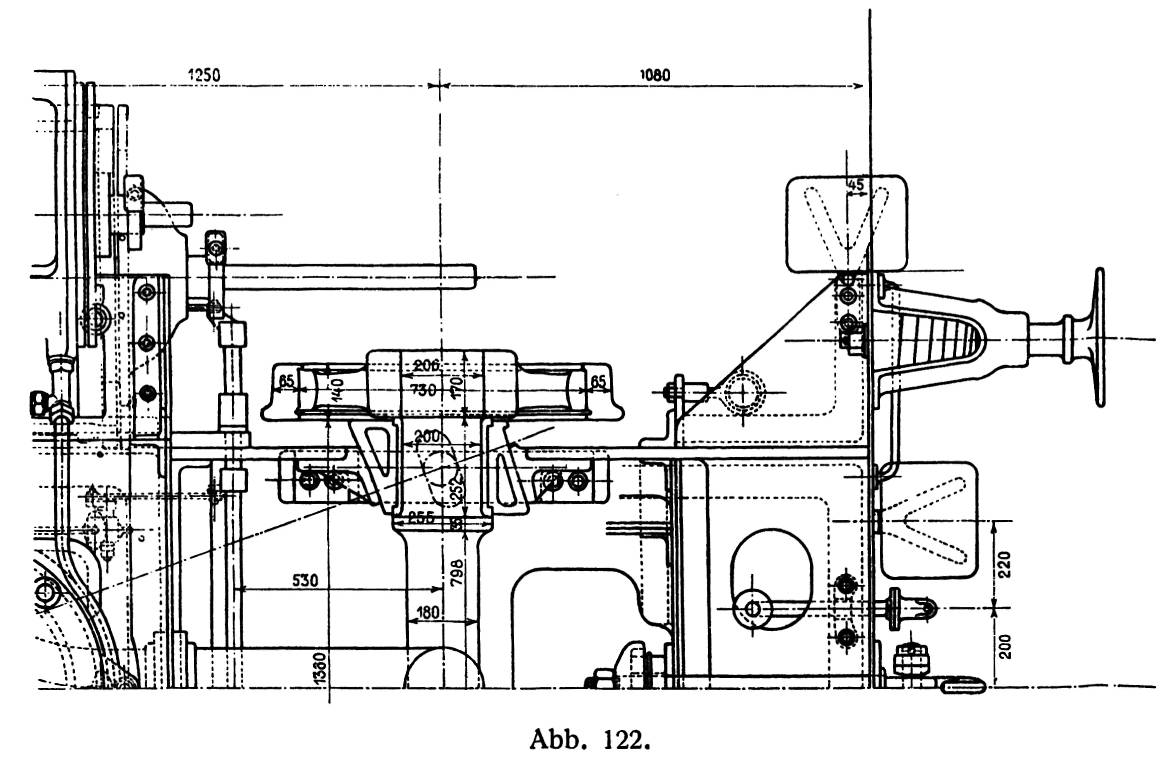
Construction drawing of an Adams axle

The Adams axle is a form of radial axle for rail locomotives that enable them to negotiate curves more easily. It was invented by William Bridges Adams and patented in 1865. The invention uses axle boxes that slide on an arc in shaped horn blocks, so allowing the axle to slide out to either side. This is similar to the movement of a Bissell truck, but with the notional centre point of the curve being where the pivot of the truck would be. This design, using slide bearings, is more expensive than one employing a shaft, but takes up less space.

== Trials ==
In 1865 the Society of Engineers, London, made direct comparison between the radial axle, invented by William Bridges Adams, and a bogie design with an india-rubber central bearing invented by William Adams: during trials on the North London Railway the laterally sprung bogie was thought superior to the radial axle, but when William Adams moved from the NLR to the London and South Western Railway he adopted the design of his rival William Bridges Adams; the locomotives now known as Adams Radials are named after the LSWR Locomotive Superintendent, but are famous for the axle invented by William Bridges Adams.

Notwithstanding the 1865 comparative trials of the two inventors' products, there is some confusion over the inventor of the axle. Lexicon der Eisenbahn cites William Adams (1823-1904) as the inventor.

== See also ==
- Lateral motion device
- Luttermöller axle

== Sources ==
- Theodor Düring: Schnellzug-Dampflokomotiven der deutschen Länderbahnen 1907-1922 Frankh, Stuttgart 1972, ISBN 3-440-03795-9
