= James Samuel =

British railway engineer (1824–1874)

- Born: 21 March 1824; Glasgow, Scotland
- Died: 25 May 1874 (aged 50); Fulham, London, England
- Education: Glasgow High School; Glasgow University
- Occupation: Engineer
- Engineering career
- Discipline: Mechanical engineering

James Samuel (21 March 1824 – 25 May 1874) was a railway engineer who was born in Glasgow on 21 March 1824. He was appointed engineer to the Eastern Counties Railway in 1846. He held two important patents but, in both cases, the invention was the work of another.

== Career ==
He became engineer to the Eastern Counties Railway in 1846.

He was a supporter of light railway vehicles and collaborated with William Bridges Adams on these. He designed a pair of light 2-2-0 locomotives for the Morayshire Railway. These were built by Neilson and Company for the opening of the line in August 1852. They were not a great success.

From 1858 he worked on civil engineering projects in Asia Minor, the US and Mexico.

== Innovations ==
In 1850 James Samuel lodged patent 13029 for a form of locomotive compounding, giving "continuous expansion" using two cylinders of equal diameter, a system devised by John Nicholson, a driver on the Eastern Counties Railway. Two locomotives were built using this system—one for goods and one for passenger traffic—and, according to papers read by James Samuel before the Institute of Mechanical Engineers in January and April 1852, the results were "highly satisfactory". Unfortunately, no other record of them is known to survive. James Samuel also patented a railway fishplate in 1844.
