= Southborough Center Historic District =

Historic district in Massachusetts, United States

- U.S. National Register of Historic Places
- U.S. Historic district
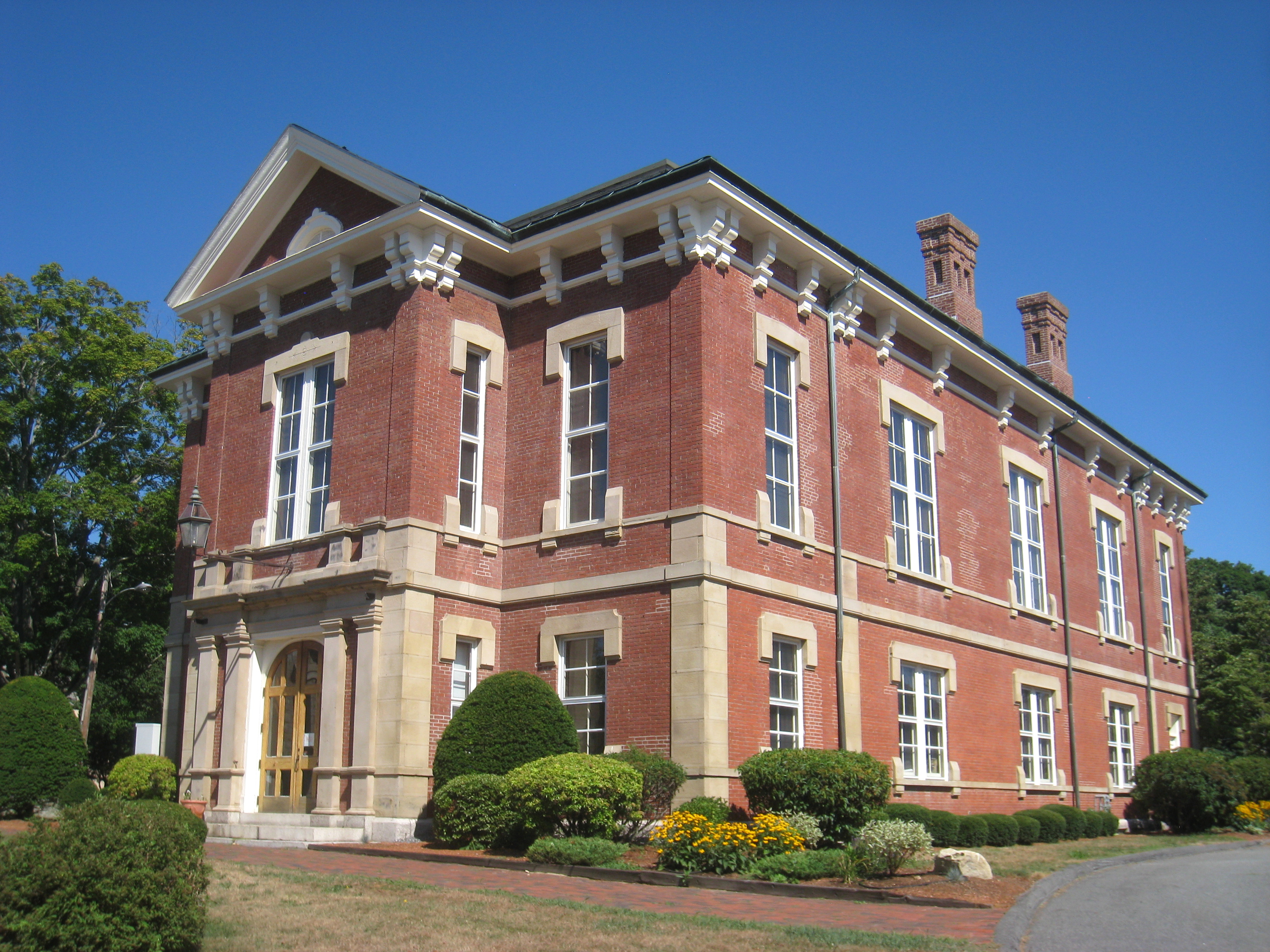
- Southborough Town House

- Location within Massachusetts Location within the United States
- Location: Main and Common Sts., Middle, Cordaville, and Latisquama Rds., Southborough, Massachusetts
- Coordinates: 42°18′22″N 71°31′43″W
- NRHP reference No.: 100007264
- Added to NRHP: December 29, 2021

The Southborough Center Historic District encompasses a historically significant portion of the town center of Southborough, Massachusetts. It extends from the Fay School grounds in the west, along Main Street to the railroad crossing east of Latisquama Road. The area has been the town center since its founding in 1727, and now houses a diversity of 19th and early 20th-century architecture. The district was added to the National Register of Historic Places in 2021.

== Description and history ==
The town of Southborough was incorporated in 1727, mostly from a portion of Marlborough. The junction of Main Street (Massachusetts Route 30) with Marlboro Road and Cordaville Road (both marked Massachusetts Route 85) has been its center of civic functions since. The surviving town common and burying ground date to this time, and its 18th-century stone-walled animal pound is also nearby. The town's first meeting house was built here, but has since been replaced by 19th-century churches and the 1870 Italianate town house, designed by Alexander Rice Esty, a regionally prominent architect.

The town was initially agrarian in nature, with small industries located along some of its waterways. Main Street was part of a major stagecoach route between Boston and Worcester, spurring economic activity in the town center. The railroad line arrived in 1850 and spurred additional development, including the establishment of two private schools (St. Mark's School and Fay School) on campuses just outside the historic district. Most of the town center's civic and religious date to the late 19th century. Notable architect-designed buildings include the town house and Episcopal church, both designed by Framingham architect Alexander Rice Esty. The town's first purpose-built firehouse was constructed on Main Street in 1927 to a design by Charles Barker.

== See also ==
- National Register of Historic Places listings in Worcester County, Massachusetts
