= LB&SCR E4 class =

British steam locomotive class (1897–1903)

LB&SCR E4 and E4X classes
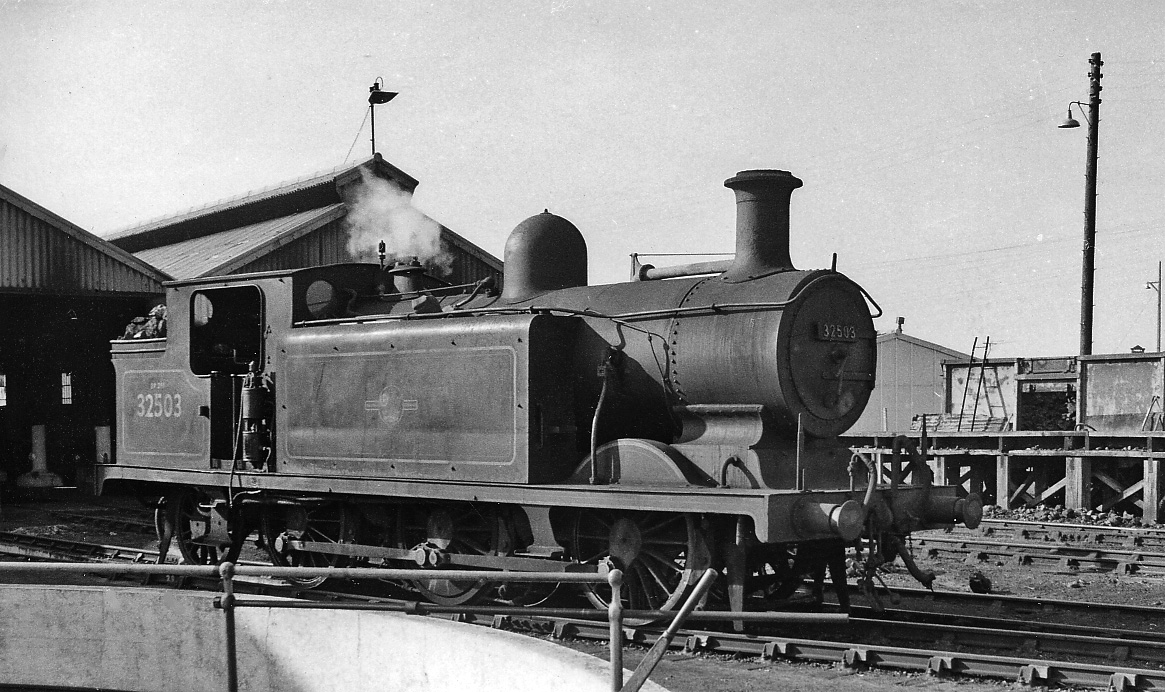
Type and origin
- Power type: Steam
- Designer: R. J. Billinton
- Builder: Brighton Works
- Build date: 1897–1903
- Total produced: 75, 4 rebuilt to E4X
Specifications
- Configuration
  - Whyte: 0-6-2T
- Gauge: 4 ft 8 1/2 in (1,435 mm) standard gauge
- Driver dia.: 5 ft 0 in (1.524 m)
- Length: 35 ft 3 in (10.744 m)
- Loco weight: E4: 56 long tons 15 cwt (127,100 lb or 57.7 t) to 57 long tons 10 cwt (128,800 lb or 58.4 t) (63.6 to 64.4 short tons); E4X: 59 long tons 5 cwt (132,700 lb or 60.2 t) (66.4 short tons)
- Fuel type: Coal
- Water cap.: 1,408 imp gal (6,400 L; 1,691 US gal)
- Boiler pressure: E4: 160 or 170 psi (11.03 or 11.72 bar; 1.10 or 1.17 MPa); E4X: 170 psi (11.72 bar; 1.17 MPa)
- Cylinders: Two, inside
- Cylinder size: 17.5 in × 26 in (444 mm × 660 mm)
Performance figures
- Tractive effort: E4: 18,050 or 19,175 lbf (80,290 or 85,290 N); E4X: 19,175 lbf (85,290 N)
Career
- Operators: LB&SCR, Southern Railway; British Railways
- Class: E4, E4x→
- Power class: BR: 2MT
- Nicknames: "Large Radials"
- Withdrawn: 1944 (1), 1948, 1955–1963
- Disposition: One preserved, remainder scrapped

The London, Brighton and South Coast Railway E4 class is a class of 0-6-2T side tank steam locomotive designed by Robert Billinton. They were introduced in 1897 and were essentially a larger version of the E3 Class with 5 ft 0 in (1,520 mm) drivers wheels for a better performance as local passenger locomotive; They had very good acceleration, but could only reach speeds of 35–40 mph (56–64 km/h) and exceeding this speed meant instability. The cylinder bore was reduced from 18 to 17.5 inches (457 to 444 mm) by the Southern Railway which increased their power.

== History ==
75 members of the class were built by Brighton railway works between December 1897 and September 1903. The "larger radial tanks" were powerful for their size and were common on local passenger, freight and branch work for more than fifty years. They were very similar to the E3 tank engines from 1891, but the key differences were that their driving wheels were enlarged from 4 ft 6 in (1,370 mm) to 5 ft (1,500 mm), and their boiler pressure was increased to 160 psi (1,100 kPa). Several were named after towns, villages and geographical features in the LB&SCR area, for example No. 469 Beachy Head. Some of their names would be re-used for H2 Atlantics a few years later.

For operations in freight trains, reverser handle would have the most convenient arrangement, but a more precise means of cut-off adjustment was necessary for passenger duty, so from No. 507 the change was made, by May 1903, Billinton gave instruction that all engines should equipped with handle-and-screw reversing except for a few, to leave them entirely to the traffic of freight and shunting duties.

Nos. 463-503: Reverse handle.

Nos. 507–520, 556–566, 577-582: Handle and screw.

The E4 class was a success in the local passenger services in the suburban and branch-lines, they too transported freight trains like their predecessors 4 ft 6 in, being useful in both assignments. The acceleration being rapid up 35-40 mph which made for local duties very suitable, but if it exceeded those speeds there-after being progressively retarded by the cramped valve-chests. Really fast running was impossible, even under favorable conditions, for the larger coupled wheels made little reduction to the volume of steam attempting to escape to the atmosphere for the larger coupled. For semi-fast services they were often found wanting unless the driver was prepared to thrash his engine and waste fuel by accelerating rapidly and making very sharp stops to save the odd minute or two. The intention was to use the larger radial tanks for semi-fast passenger service, for this they would be built the new larger radial tanks: The E5 class.

Livery:

Nos. 463–468 in Stroudley goods green.

Nos. 487–520, 556–566, 577–582 in Stroudley passenger yellow.

During World War I the Railway Operating Division (ROD) borrowed several members of the class (Nos. 470, 481, 498, 504, 506, 518, 519, 562, 563, 564, 565, 577 and 580) for work in France. They first worked at an ammunition dump in Audruicq in November 1917 and were later sent to the Arras area in February 1918. All of them were returned to England in 1919. After Grouping they were primarily to be found around the Central section of the Southern Railway, with some going away from their traditional routes to places like Waterloo, Eastleigh and Tonbridge.

All of the class entered Southern Railway ownership in 1923. No. 2483 Hellingly, was severely damaged at Eastbourne motive power depot in 1942 during the Luftwaffe air raid known as the Baedeker Blitz. Hellingly was scrapped in July 1944. One more, No. 2510, was unsuccessfully tested on the railways on the Isle of Wight in 1947. The class continued regular service after the Southern Railway was nationalised into British Railways in 1948. However the class gradually became redundant with the arrival of diesel multiple units and the reduction of branch lines during Beeching cuts in 1963, and withdrawals commenced in 1955. Most were withdrawn between 1958 and 1964.

== Accidents and incidents ==
- Locomotive No. 32468 ran into the buffers at Kemp Town station, Brighton, East Sussex - January 12, 1963.

== Operations ==
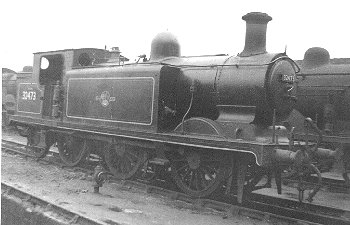
No. 32473 (formerly named Birch Grove), at Stewart's Lane in 1960 before withdrawal and subsequent preservation.

The E4 class were initially used on local passenger and freight services, and on branch lines. Later in British Railways use, several examples were used as station pilots, most famously at London Waterloo, where they brought empty carriage rakes into the station from the yards at Clapham Junction. They were also used on services such as the locally famous Lancing Belle, which ran from Brighton to the former LB&SCR's Lancing Carriage Works, often double-headed with members of the same class or the larger E6 class.

== Numbering ==
London, Brighton and South Coast Railway (LB&SCR) numbers were 463–520, 556-566 and 577–582

Southern Railway (SR) numbers were 2463–2520, 2556-2566 and 2577–32583.

British Railways (BR) numbers were 32463–32520, 32556-32566 and 32577–32582.

== E4X class ==
In 1909, four locomotives were rebuilt by D. E. Marsh with larger I2 type boilers and designated E4X and this involved moving the side tanks outwards by 5 inches (1.524 m). A fourth conversion was undertaken in 1911 but although steaming was improved the restrictions of the chassis design prevented any real advantage being gained. These became BR numbers 32466, 32477, 32478 and 32489 : These were the only examples of the E4X class.

== Preservation ==
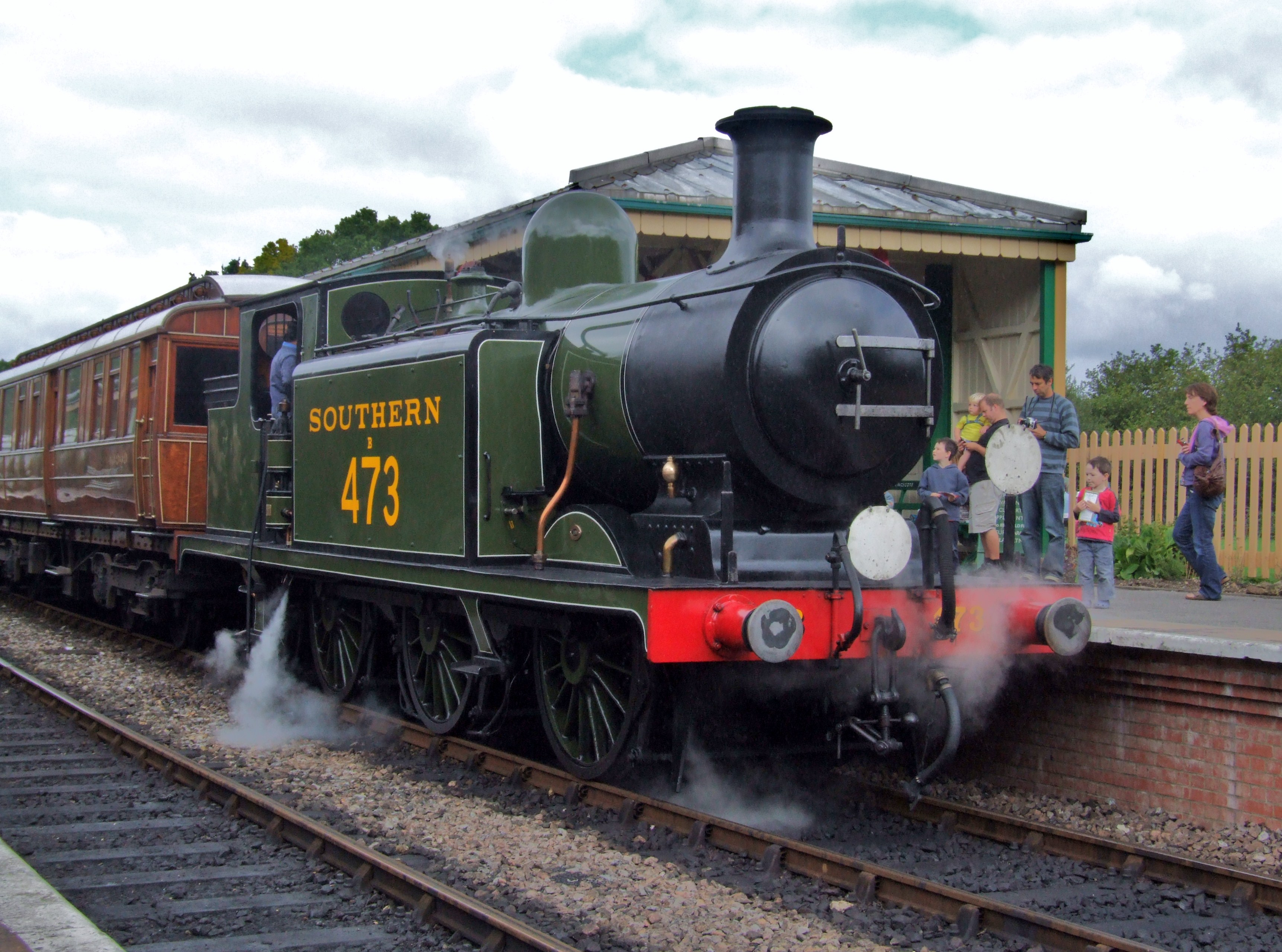
B473 in preservation at the Bluebell Railway.

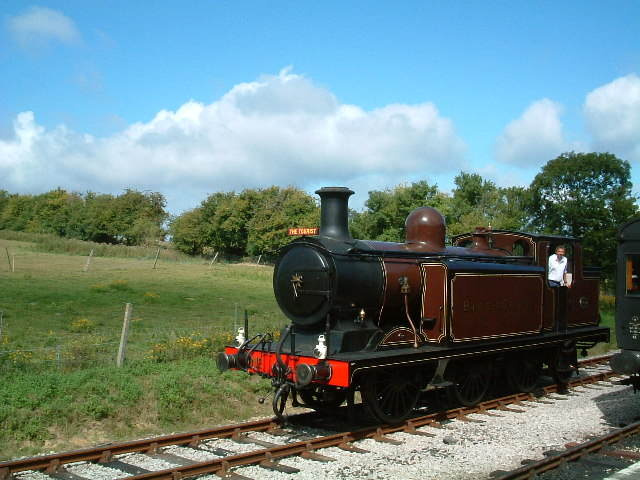
Birch Grove in LB&SCR umber livery on the Isle of Wight Steam Railway seen at Smallbrook Junction railway station.

One of the last members was No. 32473 in 1963. This was purchased by a group of preservationists and brought to the Bluebell Railway in East Sussex where it has remained ever since, except for visits to other lines such as the Severn Valley Railway and Isle of Wight Steam Railway. The engine was withdrawn from traffic in 1971 and dismantled. However work did not start in earnest until the 1980s and following a long overhaul, it returned to traffic in 1997 to celebrate its centenary in 1998.

After a short period running period-accurate post-1912 LB&SCR livery with the company's initials painted on the side tanks, these were re-lettered with its earlier name Birch Grove. In 2005, it was repainted into British Railways lined black mixed traffic livery. Following withdrawal from service in May 2008, the locomotive was soon brought into the Bluebell workshops for a fast track overhaul, including a repaint into 1920s Southern Railway green to match much of the line's coaching stock. This was completed during January 2010, with the engine reentering traffic on 30 January. 32473 is the only preserved LB&SCR locomotive not designed by William Stroudley.

== Models ==
Bachmann Branchline produced several ready to run OO gauge models of the E4 tank including examples in SR olive green, BR black and LBSCR Marsh umber livery.
