= Southborough railway station =

Southborough railway station may refer to:

- Bickley railway station near Bromley, Greater London, formerly named Southborough
- High Brooms railway station in Kent, formerly named Southborough
- Southborough station, in the U.S. state of Massachusetts
