= Radial axle =

A radial axle is an axle on a railway locomotive or carriage which has been designed to move laterally, along the arc of a circle, when entering a curve to reduce the flange and rail wear. William Bridges Adams was an early developer of radial axles.

Radial axles were widely used on carriages in the late 19th century before the adoption of bogies. They were also used on the leading or trailing axles of locomotives, particularly tank locomotives. The idea was tried successfully by William Adams on the London and South Western Railway (LSWR) in 1882 with his 415 class.

Radial axles were also used in locomotives designed by F.W. Webb of the London and North Western Railway, and by William Stroudley and R. J. Billinton of the London, Brighton and South Coast Railway (LB&SCR). Webb's radial axle used a cannon box bearing where the two axle bearings are carried in a single curved casting, the 'cannon box', which can slide sideways in a circular track. David Joy, designer of the eponymous valve gear, described encountering these axleboxes on Webb's Precedent class. The earlier Adams design had relied on the axle and thrust-faces within the axle bearings to keep the hornblocks in position.

== Sources ==
- Ahrons, Ernest Leopold (1927). The British steam railway locomotive, 1825-1925. London: Locomotive Publishing Company. OCLC 1041663104.
- Christopher, John (2014). Locomotives Of The London Brighton & South Coast Railway 1839-1903.
- Ellis, Cuthbert Hamilton (1965). Railway carriages in the British Isles : from 1830 to 1914. London: George Allen & Unwin. OCLC 923592.
- Joy, David (September 1884). Diaries.
- "LNWRS Glossary". London and North Western Railway Society. Archived from the original on 2008-01-22.
- Lowe, James Wensley (1975). British steam locomotive builders. Leicestershire: TEE Pubishers. ISBN 0-905100-57-3. OCLC 39757689.
- Simmons, Jack (1997). "Adams, William Bridges". In Simmons, Jack; Biddle, Gordon (eds.). The Oxford Companion to British Railway History From 1603 to the 1990s (1st ed.). Oxford: Oxford University Press. p. 7. ISBN 0-19-211697-5.
